= San Javier River (Santa Fe) =

Side channel of the Paraná River in Santa Fe, Argentina

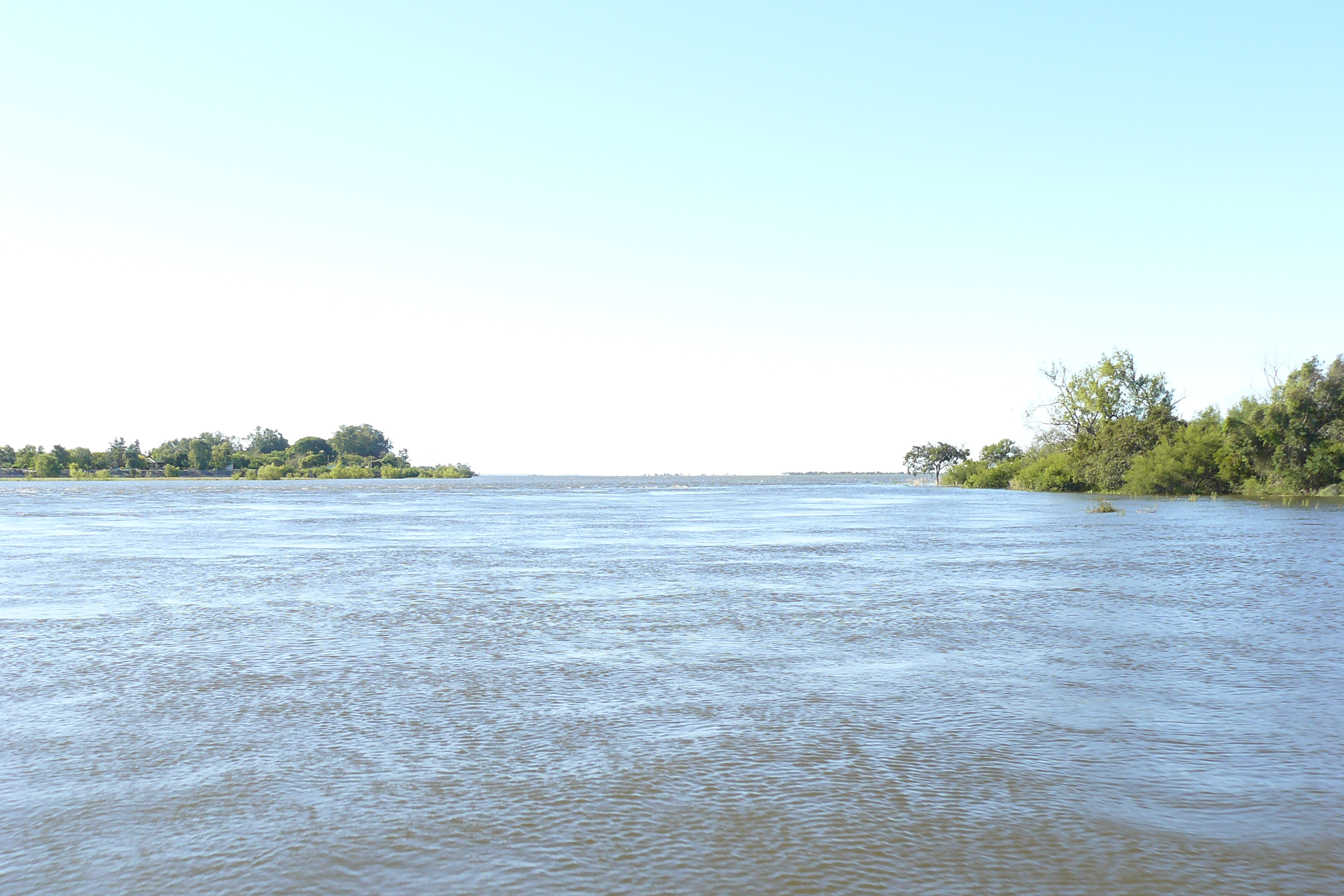
Course of the San Javier river at Helvecia town, province of Santa Fe - Argentina

The San Javier River (Spanish: Río San Javier) is an anabranch (arm or side channel) of the Paraná River in the province of Santa Fe, Argentina.

== Course ==
The lower Paraná River is highly braided, with a complex system of channels on either side of the main stem. Superficially, the San Javier River seems to be a tributary river originating in the Paraná River's alluvial plain. But it is linked by several channels to the main stem Paraná, from which it probably receives most of its water. From its primary source on the Paraná River, about 15 kilometres (9.3 mi) south of Reconquista, the San Javier flows generally south, parallel to the Paraná. It passes by San Javier and Helvecia. Its mouth does not discharge directly into the Paraná River but rather into several channels near Santa Rosa de Calchines. These not only connect to the main stem Paraná but also to other side channels that continue down the west side of the Paraná's floodplain and into the Laguna Setúbal system. Like the San Javier River, the Laguna Setúbal system superficially appears to be a tributary system, but it is cross-cut by channels linked to the main stem Paraná.

The mouth of the San Javier River is located at 31°29′50″S 60°20′32″W, about 40 kilometres (25 mi) northeast of Santa Fe City, the provincial capital. Its primary source, on the Paraná River, is located at 29°16′32″S 59°36′8″W.

The distance from its source to its mouth is about 250 kilometres (160 mi), over which it flows in a highly meandering and braided course.

== History ==
The San Javier, formerly known as Quiloazas River, was the cause of the abandonment of the initial site of the provincial capital at Cayastá, 85 km upstream from the current one, due to the erosion it caused (and still causes) on the ravine where the town was built.

== See also ==
- List of rivers of Argentina
