= Santa Rosa de Calchines =

- Town
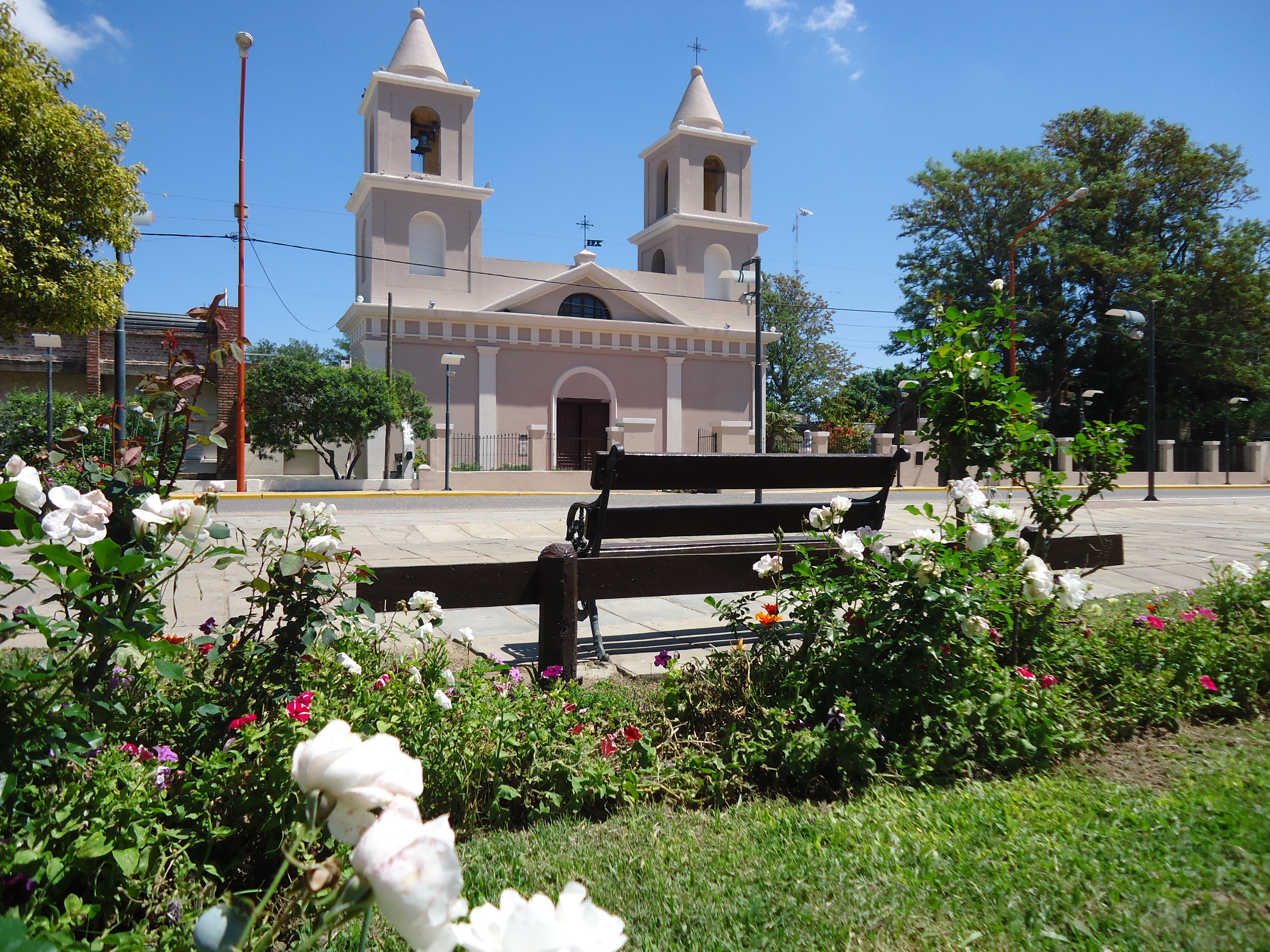
- The central part of Santa Rosa de Calchines

- Location of Santa Rosa in Argentina
- Coordinates: 31°25′S 60°20′W
- Country: Argentina
- Province: Santa Fe
- Department: Garay

Population
  - Total: 5,629
- Time zone: UTC−3 (ART)
- CPA base: S3022
- Dialing code: +54 342

Santa Rosa de Calchines (commonly shortened to Santa Rosa) is a town (comuna) in the center of the province of Santa Fe, Argentina. It has 5,629 inhabitants per the 2001 census [INDEC]. It lies 55 km northeast of the provincial capital, by Provincial Route 1, on the Calchines stream within the western banks of the San Javier River (a tributary of the Paraná).

== History ==
The town was founded in 1816 as an Indian reduction, with the name of San Miguel de Calchines, under the control of Franciscan missionaries. In 1856 the priest in charge of the reduction calculated the number of resident natives as 3,000, and asked for a town to be established. The mission was moved to San Javier in 1857, and then again to its original site in 1860.

In 1861 governor Pascual Rosas ordered the natives to be moved again to San Javier, but they rebelled and were split into three reductions: San Javier, Cayastá and Calchines. Rosas therefore decided to leave the matter as it was, founding three towns. Santa Rosa de Calchines was named in honor of St. Rose of Lima, its patron. The communal institutions were formally assembled on 14 July 1886.

== Highlights ==
- The church of St. Rose of Lima, finished in 1863, is a National Historic Monument. Its altar, brought from Naples, Italy, was donated by president Bartolomé Mitre, who attended the first mass.
- Boxing champion Carlos Monzón was killed in a car crash in the jurisdiction of Santa Rosa in 1995. A monument at the site of his death commemorates it.
