= Province of Santa Fe Railway =

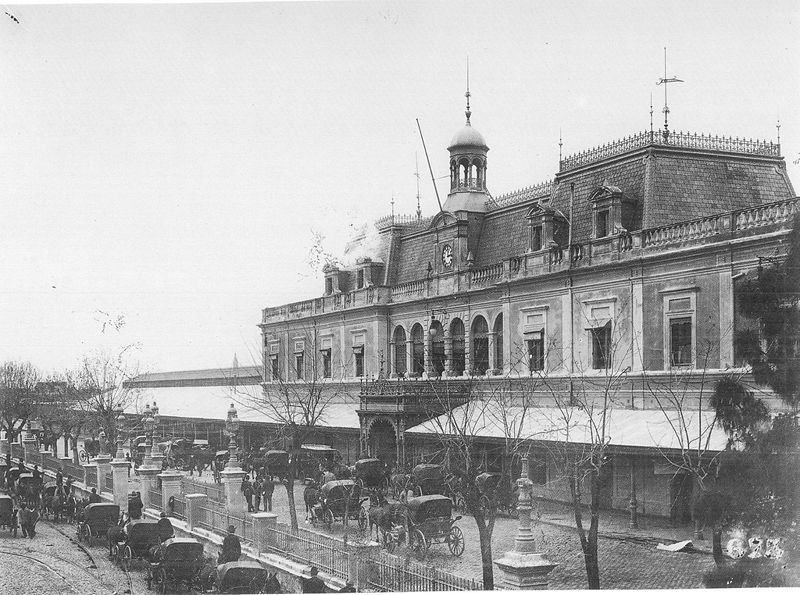
- Santa Fe Central Station, also known as La Francesa, c. 1911.

Overview
- Native name: Ferrocarril Provincial de Santa Fe
- Status: Defunct company; some lines active
- Owner: Santa Fe Province
- Locale: Santa Fe, Chaco, Córdoba

Service
- Type: Inter-city

History
- Opened: 1900
- Closed: 1948; 77 years ago

Technical
- Track gauge: 1,000 mm (3 ft 3 3/8 in) metre gauge
Route map
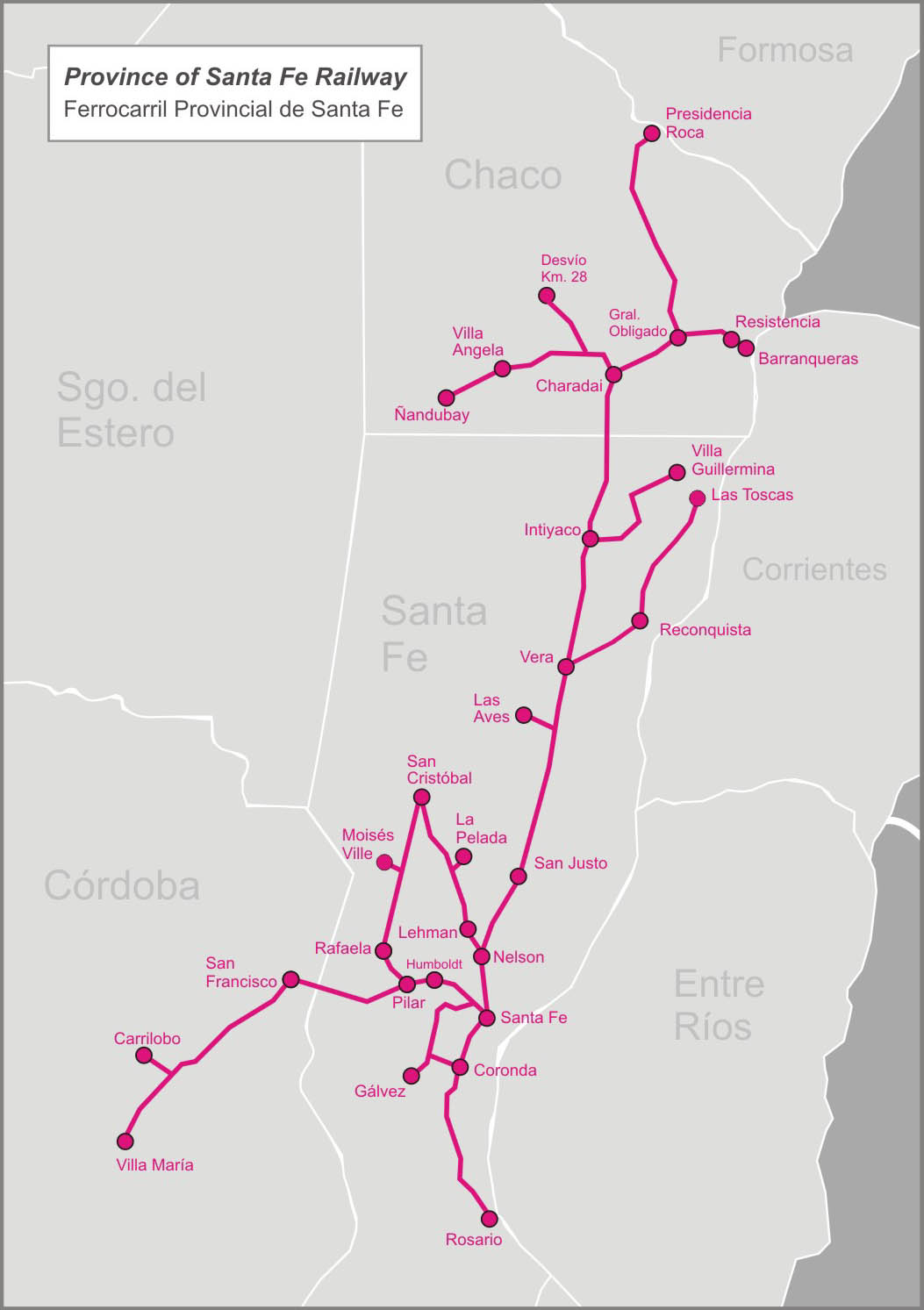

Province of Santa Fe Railway (in Spanish: Ferrocarril Provincial de Santa Fe and in French: "Compagnie Française de Chemins de Fer dans la Province de Santa Fe") was a French-owned company that purchased a 1,000 mm (3 ft 3 3/8 in) metre gauge railway network built by the provincial government of Santa Fe in Argentina on 10 April 1900 and later extended to the provinces of Chaco and Córdoba. After railway nationalisation in Argentina in 1948, it became part of the state-owned company Belgrano Railway

== History ==
=== Development ===
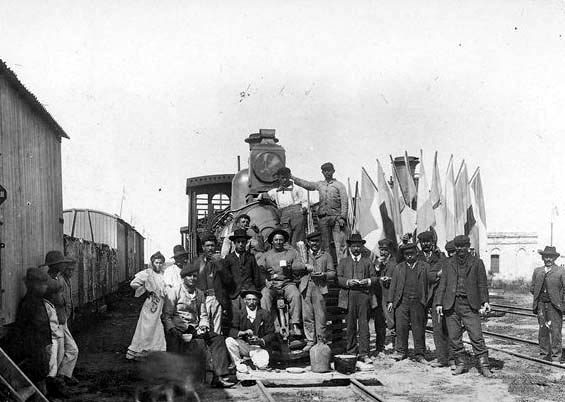
Workers of the railway, 1897.

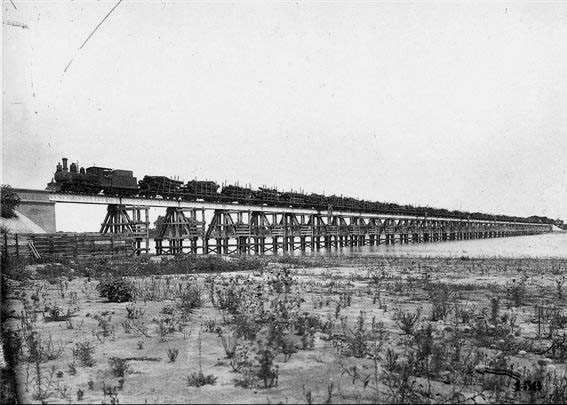
A train crossing the bridge over Laguna Setubal, 1903.

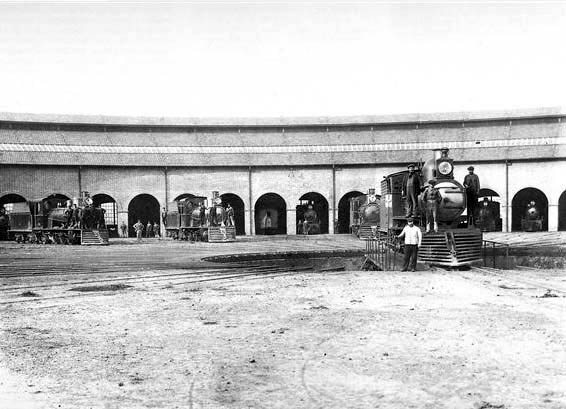
Locomotives shed, 1911.

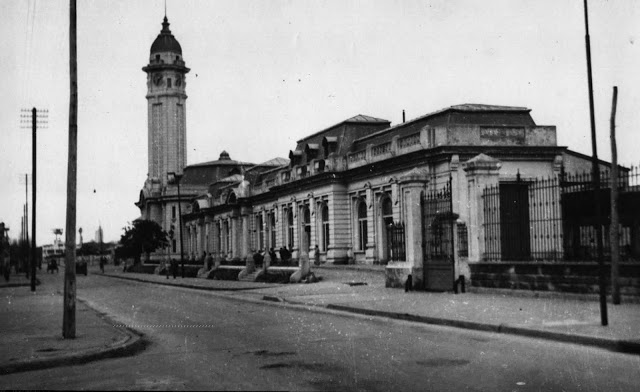
Rosario station in the 1930s. The main building was refurbished in the 1950 and re-opened as the bus terminal of the city.

The company had its origins in the signing of a contract between the Santa Fe Provincial government and John G. Meiggs Son & Co. for the construction of a 100 km (62 mi) line north from the city of Santa Fe in the direction of the agricultural colonies. The section from Santa Fe to Rafaela was opened on 1 July 1885 and from Rafaela to Lehmann on 1 May 1886. Later the same year branch lines were opened from Empalme San Carlos to San Carlos Sur on 1 July and from Santa Fe to Colastiné on 15 October, and the line from Lehman to San Cristóbal was opened on 31 December. The line from San Carlos Sur to Gálvez was completed on 1 July 1887 and the following year the line from Humboldt to Providencia was opened on 1 January and extended to Soledad on 1 June.

On 1 January 1888 the line from Coronda to Hessler and from Pilar to Josefina and San Francisco was opened, and on 1 September later that year the lines from Santa Fe to Rosario and to San Justo were opened. The later was the first section of a line which reached Chaco Province in the following stages: Escalada in May 1889, Calchaquí in September 1889, Vera in February 1890 and La Sabena on 1 November 1892. The branch line from Colastiné to Rincón was completed in December 1889.

Until then the property of the Province, the company was transferred on 10 April 1900, by provincial decree, to the "Compañía Francesa de los Ferrocarriles de la Provincia de Santa Fe", the oldest of the three French–owned railway companies in Argentina, formed by the great banque d'affaires Paribas, the steel company Fives Lille and a group of financiers associated with the latter.

In Córdoba the French company opened a line from San Francisco to Villa María on 30 April 1904 and a branch line from Pozo del Molle to Carrilobo was added on 11 September 1907 and later that month on 20 September the line within Chaco Province was extended from La Sabena to Barranqueras. A branch line from Charaday to Oetling was opened on 10 November 1911, from Horquilla to Enrique Urién on 16 August 1912 and on to Villa Angela on 22 December 1914. Branches were added to the main line from Vera to Reconquista on 18 November 1913 and from Km 340 to Villa Guillermina the same year.

=== Sale to French consortium ===
The Ferrocarril Santafesino, built and operated by the Santa Fe Province until then, was transferred to French-owned "Compañía Francesa de los Ferrocarriles de la Provincia de Santa Fe" by decree on April 10, 1900. The Compañía Francesa was a consortium formed by Gran Banque d'Affaires Paribas, steel producer Fives Lille and a group of associate financiers.

The recently formed company opened a branch from Virginia to Moisés Ville in December 1901 and two years later, an access to the Port of San Martín.

In Córdoba Province, the San Francisco-Villa María line was opened in April 1904. The Pozo del Molle-Córdoba branch was extended to Carrilobo in September 1907. That same month the line also extended from La Sabana to Barranqueras in Chaco Province.

In 1911 a freight railway was built between Sorrento and the electric power plant owned by the Sociedad de Electricidad del Rosario in Barrio Sarmiento. From Charaday to Oetling the line was opened in November 1911, in August 1912 the Horquilla-Enrique Urién section was opened, reaching Villa Angela in December 1914. The Vera-Reconquista line was opened in November 1913, that same year a branch to Villa Guillermina was also opened.

During the second half of the 1920s the company made a restructuring of the railway, building new access and stations (being Capitán Bermúdez one of them) and a new building for the terminal station in Rosario, opened in 1929. The building would be later closed and reopened as a bus station in 1950.

Other branches built by the company (that totalized 146-km length) include the Lanteri-Las Toscas (72 km), Enrique Urien to Ñandubay (44 km.), and Oetling-Punta Rieles al Norte (30 km).

When the entire Argentine railway network was nationalised in 1948, during Juan Perón's presidency, the FCPSF became part of the state-owned Belgrano Railway

== See also ==
- Belgrano Railway
- Mariano Moreno bus station

== Bibliography ==
- Foreign Capital, Local Interests and Railway Development in Argentina: French Investments in Railways, 1900–1914 by Andres M. Regalsky - Journal of Latin American Studies (Oct. 1989)
