= Santurce =

Santurce can refer to:

- Santurce (Basque: Santurtzi), a town near Bilbao, the Basque Country, Spain; the original town with the name
- Santurce, Argentina, a town in Santa Fe, Argentina.
- Santurce, San Juan, Puerto Rico, a barrio of San Juan
