= San Javier Department, Santa Fe =

San Javier Department
- Department
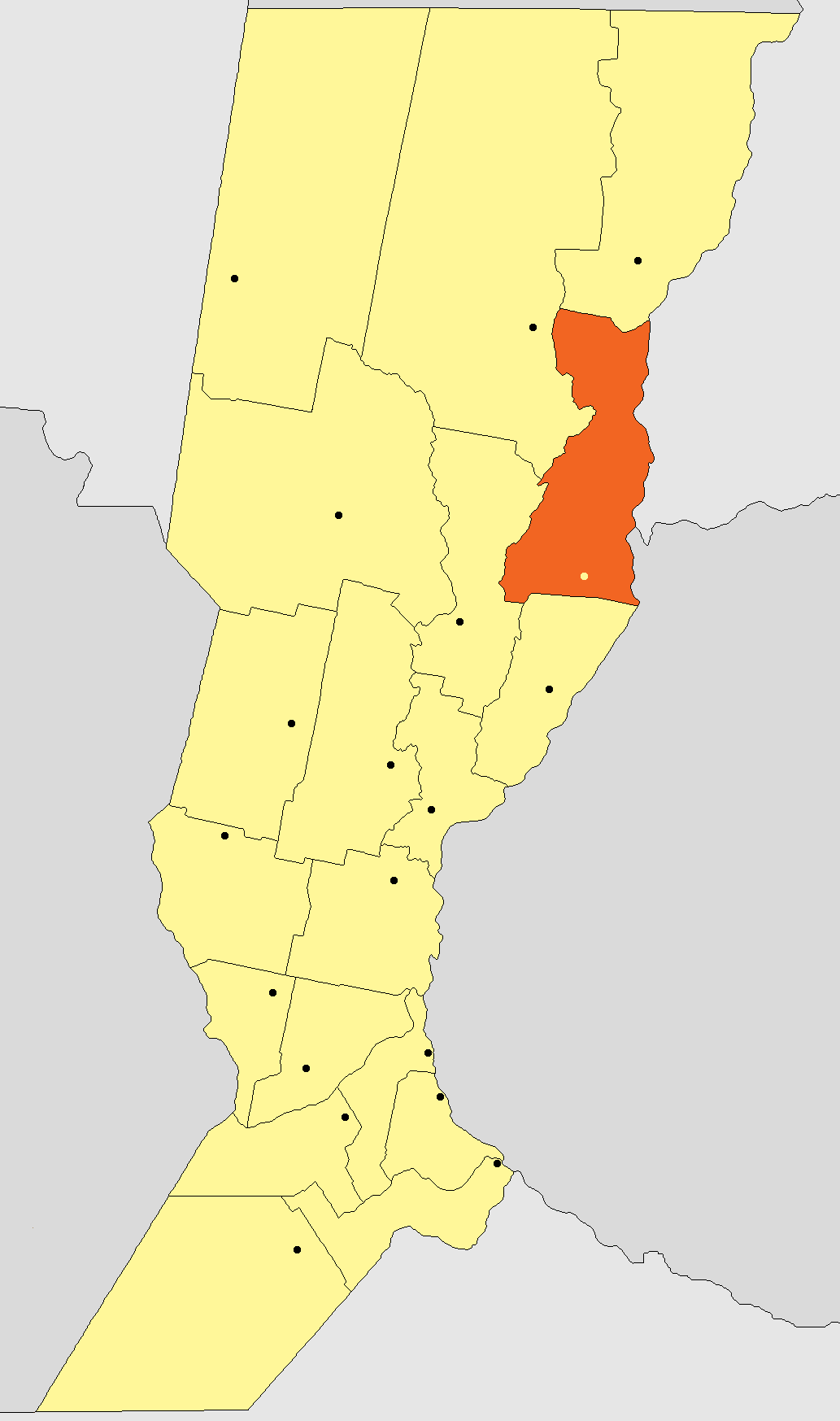
- Location of San Javier Department within Santa Fe Province
- Coordinates: 30°35′S 59°57′W
- Country: Argentina
- Province: Santa Fe
- Head town: San Javier

Area
  - Total: 6,929 km^{2} (2,675 sq mi)

Population
  - Total: 29,912
  - Density: 4.317/km^{2} (11.18/sq mi)
- Time zone: UTC-3 (ART)

The San Javier Department (in Spanish, Departamento San Javier) is an administrative subdivision (departamento) of the province of Santa Fe, Argentina. It is located on the northeast of the province, with its eastern border coinciding with the provincial border along the Paraná River.

The department's head town is the city of San Javier, which has over 15,000 inhabitants (more than half the population of the department). The department also includes the towns of Alejandra, Cacique Ariacaiquín, Colonia Durán, La Brava, and Romang.

San Javier Department borders the departments of Garay (south), San Justo (southwest), Vera (west), and General Obligado (north).
