= Néstor Clausen =

Argentine footballer and manager

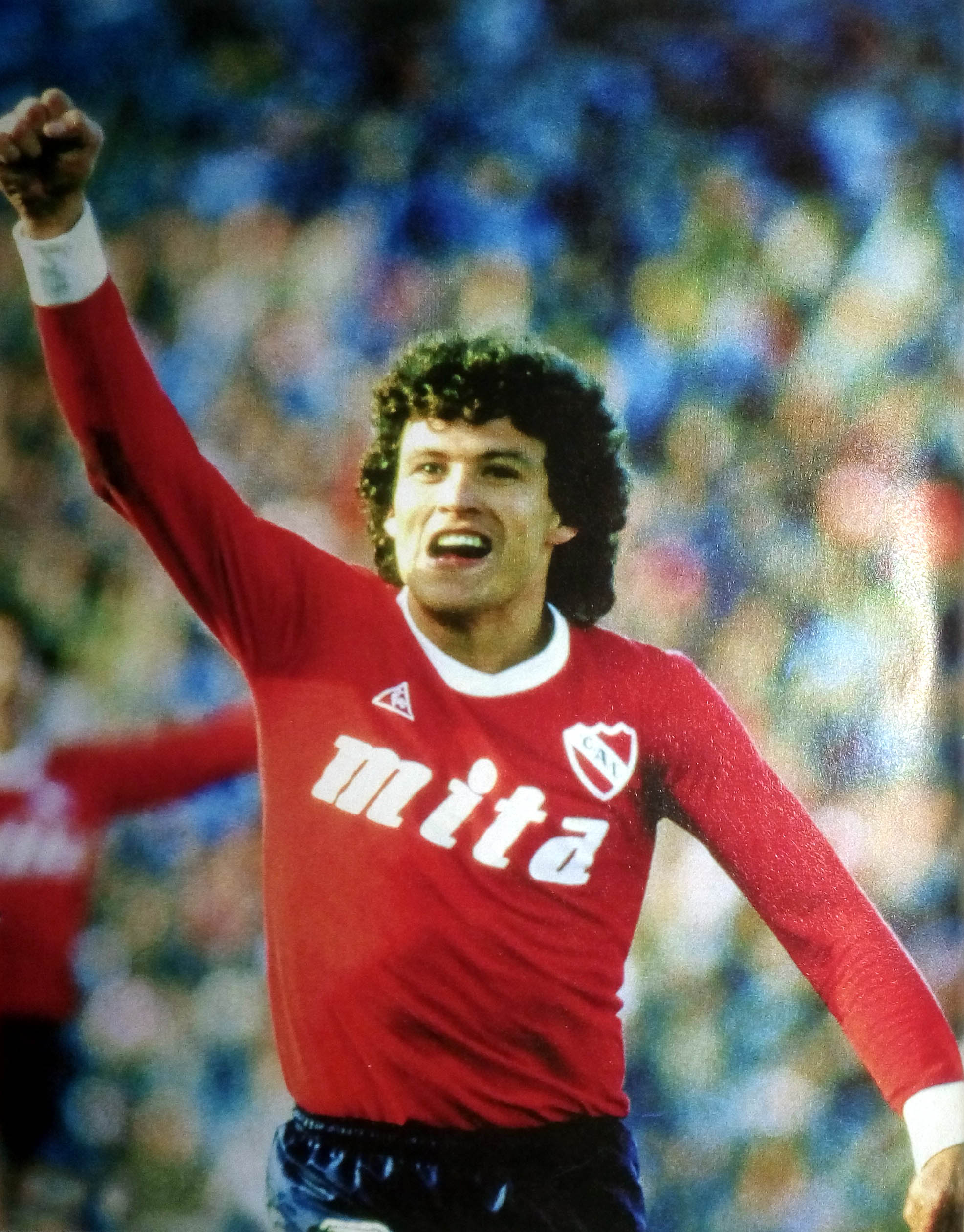
- Clausen in 1987 with Independiente

Personal information
- Full name: Néstor Rolando Clausen
- Date of birth: 29 September 1962 (age 64)
- Place of birth: Arrufó, Santa Fe, Argentina
- Height: 1.76 m (5 ft 9 in)
- Position: Defender

Senior career*
Years	Team	Apps	(Gls)
1980–1988	Independiente	260	(7)
1989–1994	FC Sion	73	(2)
1994–1995	Racing Club	22	(0)
1995–1996	Independiente	15	(0)
1997–1998	Arsenal de Sarandí	12	(0)
Total		382	(9)

International career
1981	Argentina U20	3	(0)
1983–1989	Argentina	26	(1)

Managerial career
- 1999–2001: Independiente (youth coordinator)
- 1999–2001: Independiente (youth)
- 2001–2002: Independiente
- 2002–2003: Oriente Petrolero
- 2003–2004: The Strongest
- 2004–2005: Chacarita Juniors
- 2006–2007: FC Sion
- 2007–2008: Oman (assistant)
- 2008–2009: Neuchâtel Xamax
- 2009: Al-Kuwait
- 2010: Bolívar
- 2011: The Strongest
- 2011: Dubai Club
- 2012–2013: Blooming
- 2013: Wilstermann
- 2014: Sport Boys Warnes
- 2014: Bolivia (interim)
- 2015: San José
- 2016: Mushuc Runa
- 2016–2017: Club Sportif Sfaxien
- 2017: San José
- 2017–2018: Oriente Petrolero
- 2019: San José
- 2020: Deportivo Llacuabamba
- 2021: Real Santa Cruz
- 2022: Blooming
Medal record
Representing Argentina
FIFA World Cup
Winner	1986 Mexico	Team
- * Club domestic league appearances and goals

Néstor Rolando Clausen (born 29 September 1962) is an Argentine football manager and former player who played as a defender.

A native of Arrufó, Santa Fe Province, his ancestors were originally from Ernen, Valais in Switzerland and emigrated to Argentina around the year 1889.

In his career, he played for Club Atlético Independiente, FC Sion, among others, and won the 1986 FIFA World Cup with Argentina.

== Honours ==
=== Player ===
Independiente

- Metropolitano: 1983
- Copa Libertadores: 1984
- Copa Intercontinental: 1984
- Primera Division Argentina: 1988–89
- Supercopa Sudamericana: 1995

FC Sion

- Schweizer Cup: 1990–91
- Swiss Super League: 1991–92

Argentina

- FIFA World Cup: 1986

=== Manager ===
The Strongest

- Torneo Apertura: 2003
- Torneo Clausura: 2003
