= Romang =

Romang may refer to:

- Romang (island), an Indonesian island
- Romang language, a Malayo-Polynesian language spoken on Romang island
- Romang, Santa Fe, a municipality in Argentina

== People ==
- Martin Romang, Swiss curler
- Pilar Romang, Argentine field hockey player
- Teófilo Romang, the namesake of Romang, Santa Fe in Argentina

== See also ==
- Romange, a commune in the Jura department in the region of Franche-Comté in eastern France
