= Gonzalo Alassia =

Argentine footballer (born 2004)

Personal information
- Date of birth: 13 February 2004 (age 22)
- Place of birth: Suardi, Argentina
- Position: Midfielder

Team information
- Current team: San Lorenzo
- Number: 62

Youth career
- Sportivo Suardi
- 2018–2020: Atlético de Rafaela

Senior career*
Years	Team	Apps	(Gls)
2020–2024	Atlético de Rafaela	9	(0)
2024–	San Lorenzo	4	(0)
- * Club domestic league appearances and goals as of 18:13, 21 November 2026 (UTC)

Gonzalo Alassia (born 13 February 2004) is an Argentine professional footballer who plays as a central midfielder for San Lorenzo.

== Career ==
Alassia, after a spell with hometown club Sportivo Suardi, joined the youth ranks of Atlético de Rafaela at the beginning of 2018. Having spent two years progressing through their academy, the central midfielder was promoted into Walter Otta's first-team squad in December 2020. Alassia made his senior debut on 27 December in a Primera B Nacional home victory over Gimnasia y Esgrima, as he was substituted on in place of Rodrigo Castro with twenty-three minutes remaining.

== Career statistics ==
As of 4 January 2021.

Appearances and goals by club, season and competition
Club	Season	League			Cup		League Cup		Continental		Other		Total	
Club	Season	Division	Apps	Goals	Apps	Goals	Apps	Goals	Apps	Goals	Apps	Goals	Apps	Goals
Atlético de Rafaela	2020	Primera B Nacional	1	0	0	0	—		—		0	0	1	0
Career total			1	0	0	0	—		—		0	0	1	0
