= Helvetic =

Helvetic may refer to:

- Helvetii, Celtic tribes inhabiting most of the Swiss Plateau during the Roman Empire
- Helvetic Republic, the precursor of the state of Switzerland
- Helvetic (geology), a geologic zone in the Alps
- Helvetic Airways, a Swiss airline

== See also ==
- Helvetia (disambiguation)
- Helvetica (disambiguation)
- Helvete (disambiguation)
