= Helvetia (disambiguation) =

Helvetia is the female personification of Switzerland.

Helvetia may also refer to:

- 113390 Helvetia, an asteroid
- Helvetia (band), a rock band from Seattle, Washington
- Helvetia Insurance, a Swiss insurance company
- Helvetia (magazine), periodical for Swiss Occidentalists
- Helvetia (ship, 1875), a paddle steamer that operated on Lake Zurich from 1875 to 1958
- Helvetia (ship, 1964), a motor vessel that has operated on Lake Zurich since 1964
- Helvetia (spider), a genus of jumping spiders
- Helvetia (train), an express train formerly operated between Germany and Switzerland
- Helvetia, Arizona, a ghost town
- Helvetia, New Zealand, a location/hamlet near Pukekohe, New Zealand
- Helvetia, Oregon
- Helvetia, West Virginia
- Helvetia, Wisconsin
- USS Helvetia (SP-3096), a United States Navy patrol vessel in commission from 1918 to 1919
- Helvetia, the fictional country that the 2010 anime Sound of the Sky is set in
- Helvetia Tinde, the highest peak in Peary Land, North Greenland
- Medan Helvetia, an administrative district in Medan, Indonesia
- Helvetia Boswell, American jazz musician with the Boswell Sisters

== See also ==
- New Helvetia, a Mexican-era California settlement
- Nueva Helvecia, a city in Uruguay
- Helvecia, a town in Argentina
- Helvécia, a village in Hungary near Kecskemét
- Helvetica (disambiguation)
- Helvetii, the Celtic inhabitants of Helvetia
- Switzerland in the Roman era
