= Llambi Campbell =

- Town
- Location within Santa Fe Province Location within Argentina
- Coordinates: 31°11′00″S 60°45′00″W
- Country: Argentina
- Province: Santa Fe
- Department: La Capital
- Foundation: 5 July 1893
- Elevation: 37 m (121 ft)

Population (2010)
  - Total: 2,260
- Time zone: UTC−3 (ART)

Llambi Campbell is a town located in La Capital Department in the Santa Fe Province, Argentina. It is 50 km (31 mi) from the provincial capital Santa Fe.

== History ==
Llambi Campbell was founded on 5 July 1893 by Paulino Llambi Campbell.

== Twin towns ==
- La Cassa, Italy
