= Laura Devetach =

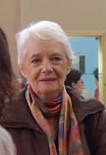
- Born: 5 October 1936 (age 89); Reconquista, Santa Fe
- Education: Cordoba University
- Known for: writing for children in Spanish

Maria Laura Devetach (born 5 October 1936) is an Argentinian writer for children.

== Life ==
Devetach was born in Reconquista, Santa Fe in 1936 to a Slovenian father and an Argentine mother who was very skilled with textiles. She has worked as an educator of both children and adults. Devetach has published more than ninety books and many of these are for children. She was married to Gustavo Roldán who died in 2012 and they had two children. One of these children is a cartoonist named for his father. He has illustrated some of his mother's books.
