= Sauce Viejo, Argentina =

Sauce Viejo
- City
- Location of Sauce Viejo in Argentina
- Coordinates: 31°46′S 60°51′W
- Country: Argentina
- Province: Santa Fe
- Department: La Capital

Government
  - Intendant: Mario Claudio Papaleo (FPCyS)

Area
  - Total: 79 km^{2} (31 sq mi)

Population (2010 census)
  - Total: 8,123
  - Density: 100/km^{2} (270/sq mi)
- Demonym: sauceviejense
- Time zone: UTC−3 (ART)
- Dialing code: +54 342

Sauce Viejo is a city in the province of Santa Fe, Argentina. It is located about 22 km from the province's capital city, Santa Fe, and has a population of 8,123 inhabitants (2010 census [INDEC]) which represents a growth of 87.96% compared to the 3,631 inhabitants (2001 census [INDEC]) of the previous census.

The town of was founded on December 12, 1912 by Provincial law.

== Sauce Viejo Airport (ICAO:SAAV) ==
- It is located 17 km SW of Santa Fe, Argentina
