= Recreo, Santa Fe =

Recreo
- Location in Argentina
- Coordinates: 31°29′27″S 60°44′8″W
- Country: Argentina
- Province: Santa Fe Province
- Department: La Capital

Government
  - Intendant: Omar Antonio Colombo (PS)

Area
  - Total: 26.36 km^{2} (10.18 sq mi)
- Elevation: 17 m (56 ft)

Population (2015)
  - Total: 7,200
  - Density: 270/km^{2} (710/sq mi)
- Time zone: UTC-3
- Postal code: S3018
- Area code: 0342

Recreo is a town in Santa Fe Province, Argentina founded in 1890 as a general human settlement but made officially a city in 2005. Two major roads run through Recreo, Route 11 (country-level) and province-level Route-70.

Due to significant local government investment over the 20th and 21st century, Recreo has 18 schools, 15 public schools, 2 'religious' schools and one private kindergarten. Recreo also receives frequent floods from the adjacent Salado River.
