= Tostado, Santa Fe =

Tostado
- City
- Location of Tostado in Argentina
- Coordinates: 29°14′S 61°46′W
- Country: Argentina
- Province: Santa Fe
- Department: Nueve de Julio

Government
  - Intendant: Andrés Cagliero (UNITE)

Area
  - Total: 3,908 km^{2} (1,509 sq mi)
- Elevation: 64 m (210 ft)

Population (2010 census)
  - Total: 14,582
  - Density: 3.731/km^{2} (9.664/sq mi)
- Time zone: UTC−3 (ART)
- CPA base: S3060
- Dialing code: +54 3491

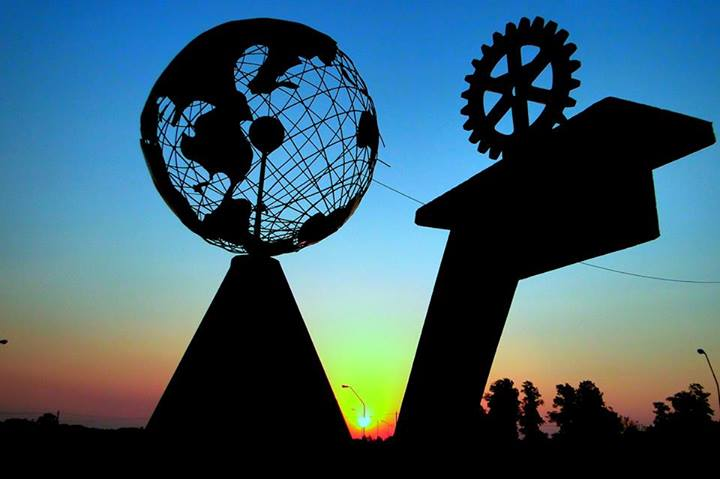
Entrance Globe at Tostado

Tostado is a city in the northwest of the province of Santa Fe, Argentina, 334 km (208 mi) north-west from the provincial capital. It had about 14,000 inhabitants at the 2010 census [INDEC] and it is the head town of the Nueve de Julio Department.

The town was founded in 1891 and attained the status of comuna (commune) on 8 August 1904. It became a city on 31 December 1970.

== Notable people ==
- Lucas Alario, footballer
- Alejandra Ironici, activist
