= Alejandra Ironici =

Argentine human rights activist (1976–2022)

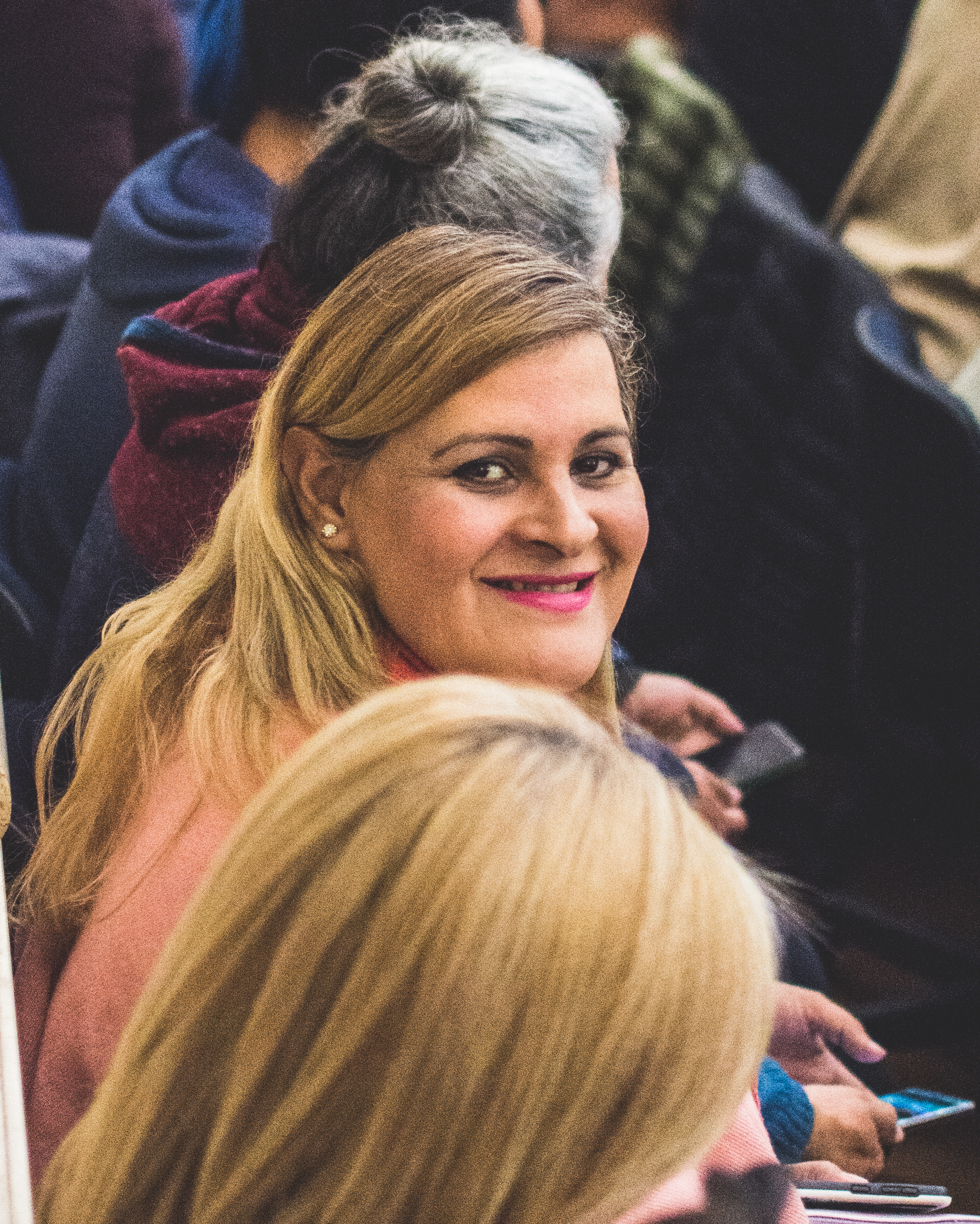
- Ironici in May 2022
- Born: 4 November 1976; Tostado, Santa Fe Province, Argentina
- Died: 21 August 2022 (aged 45); Santa Fe, Santa Fe Province, Argentina
- Cause of death: Stabbed to death
- Education: National University of the Littoral
- Occupations: Human rights activist Teacher
- Years active: 2012–2022
- Known for: First person to legally change their gender on their Argentine identity card

Victoria Alejandra Selenia Ironici-Castillo (4 November 1976–21 August 2022) was an Argentine human rights activist. In 2012, she became the first person in Argentina to legally change their gender on their identity card.

== Early life ==
Ironici was born in 1976 in Tostado, Santa Fe Province. At the age of 18, she moved to the city of Santa Fe after experiencing transphobia from her family.

== Activism ==
On 12 March 2012, Ironici became the first trans woman to receive an Argentine national identity document that acknowledged her gender identity, through administrative channels. This happened prior to the enactment of the Gender Identity Law on 24 May 2012.

Ironici became known as an activist, both for LGBT rights, particularly transgender and travesti people, as well as for feminist and community organisations. She worked as the coordinator for the Movement for Social, Ethnic and Religious Integration (Spanish: Movimiento por la Integración Social, Étnica y Religiosa, MISER), a non-governmental organisation based in Santa Fe. Ironici was also a member of the Socialist Women's Network (Red de Mujeres Socialistas), as well as an organiser of the Ni una menos movement in Santa Fe. Other positions held by Ironici included being co-director of the Archives of Sex Dissident Memories of Santa Fe (Archivo Memorias Sexodisidentes de Santa Fe) and president of the Barranquitas Neighbourhood Improvement Association (Vecinal Pro-Mejoras Barranquitas).

In October 2012, Ironici began working within the social assistance team at Iturraspe Hospital, becoming the first transgender woman to hold a public sector job in Santa Fe Province. She went on to work as a health promoter at Sayago Hospital and as a coordinator for the transgender health programme run by the Undersecretariat of Sexual Diversity of Santa Fe Province.

In 2017, Ironici began studying law at the National University of the Littoral. During her time studying, she campaigned for the university to implement a trans employment quota, which it eventually did in May 2022. Ironici also took part in the university's gender programme, and taught classes on the Micaela Law, an Argentine law that established mandatory training on gender issues and violence against women for public sector employees.

In 2021, Ironici began teaching as a substitute secondary school teacher, becoming one of the first openly transgender teachers in Santa Fe, alongside Lucy Giménez.

== Death ==
On 21 August 2022, Ironici's body was found at her home by her nephew. The house was on fire, and Ironici was found lying in a pool of blood. After the police arrived and confirmed Ironici's death, it was discovered that her partner, Horacio Barrera, was not at the scene, nor was his car. A police search occurred, and Barrera was arrested following his discovery.

Ironici's body was found to have 46 separate stab wounds, in addition to some burns from the house fire. The Prosecutor's Office, supported by the Special Prosecutor's Unit for Gender, Family and Sexual Violence, stated its intention to charge her killer with transfemicide, a hate crime for which they could receive a sentence of life imprisonment.

Barrera was charged with Ironici's death; his trial started on 12 March 2024 in Santa Fe. He pleaded guilty to transfemicide, but denied having sexually assaulted Ironici prior to her death. On 23 March, Barrera was sentenced to life imprisonment.

== Recognition ==
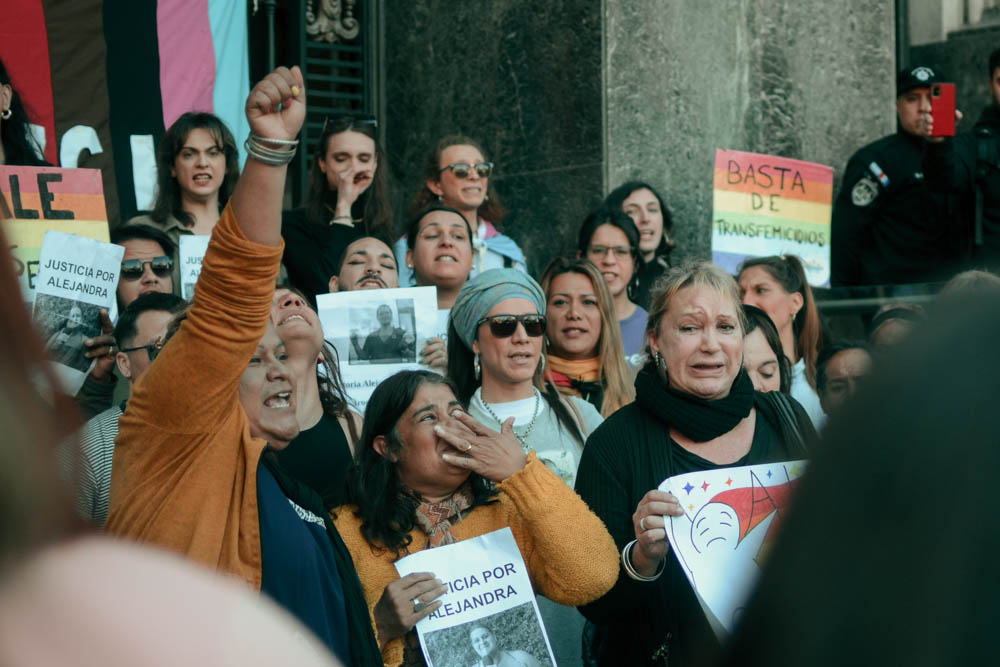
Activists protesting Ironici's murder in Santa Fe on 22 August 2022

Ironici's murder led to public outrage, including from LGBT activist Esteban Paulón and María Florencia Marinaro, the Santa Fe Minister of Equality. On 22 August, the day after Ironici's death, a rally called Justicia por Alejandra Ironici (lit. 'Justice for Alejandra Ironici') was held in front of the provincial courts in Santa Fe, followed by a protest march. The provincial government subsequently issued a statement denouncing Ironici's murder and announcing its intention to join the criminal proceedings as a plaintiff.

On 21 September 2022, a ceremony was held by Santa Fe City Council to commemorate Ironici and her activism, exactly a month after her death. The ceremony, which was spearheaded by Santa Fe councillor Laura Mondino, included legislators, municipal officials, council members, LGBT community leaders, and Ironici's family members and friends.

On 4 October 2022, a public monument commissioned by the Santa Fe government's Ministry of Equality, Gender and Diversity, was unveiled in Sauce Viejo, named after Ironici. In April 2023, a memorial for Ironici, named the Paseo de la Diversidad «Alejandra Ironici» (lit. 'Alejendra Ironici Diversity Walkway'), opened in central Santa Fe. The memorial was spearheaded by local authorities and activists.
