= Nueve de Julio Department, Santa Fe =

Nueve de Julio Department
- Department
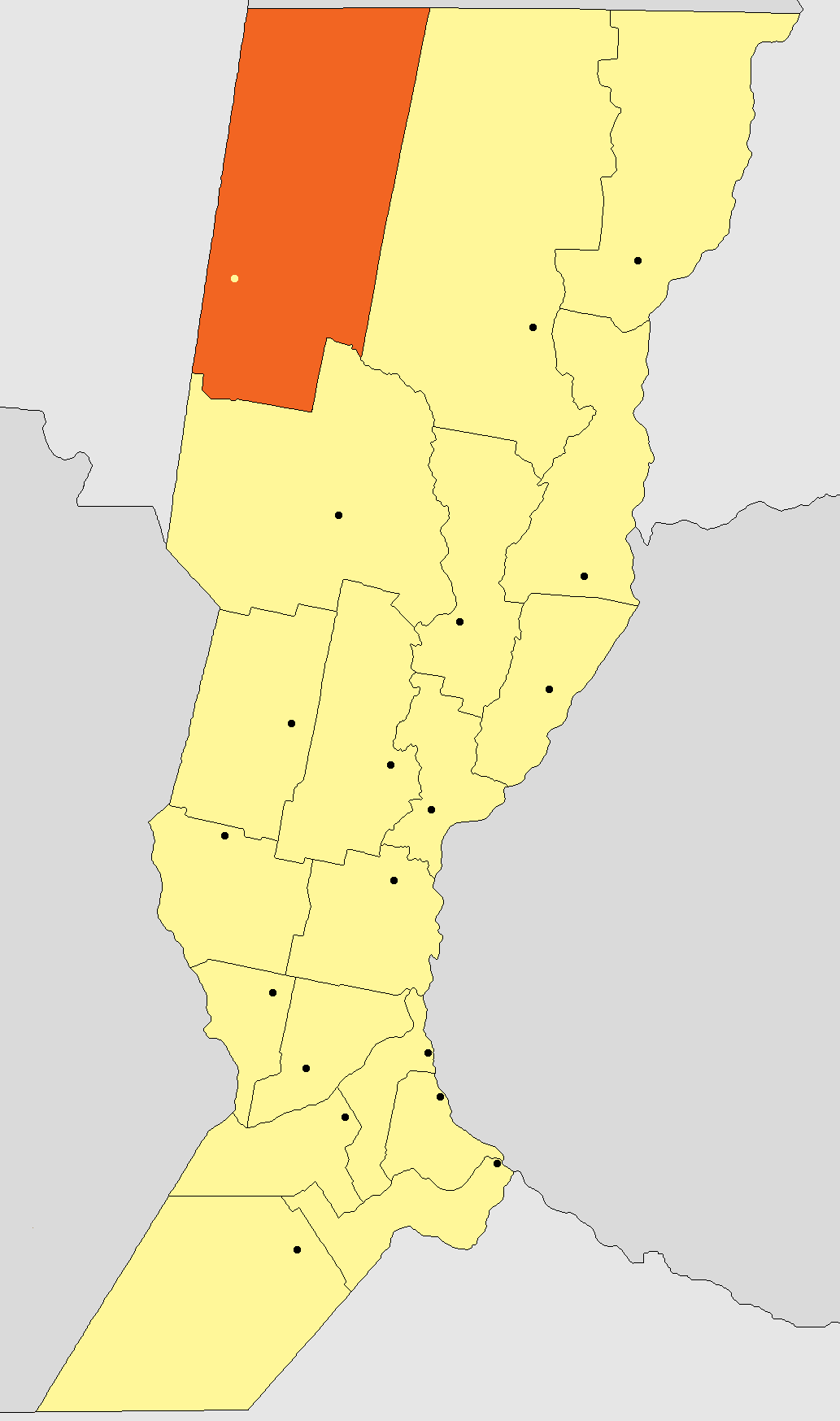
- Location of Nueve de Julio Department within Santa Fe Province
- Coordinates: 29°14′S 61°46′W
- Country: Argentina
- Province: Santa Fe
- Head town: Tostado

Area
  - Total: 16,870 km^{2} (6,510 sq mi)

Population
  - Total: 28,273
  - Density: 1.676/km^{2} (4.341/sq mi)
- Time zone: UTC-3 (ART)

The Nueve de Julio Department (in Spanish, Departamento Nueve de Julio) is an administrative subdivision (departamento) of the province of Santa Fe, Argentina. It is located in the northwestern corner of the province, limiting with the Vera Department in the east, and with the San Cristóbal Department in the south. To the north it limits with the province of Chaco, and to the west with the province of Santiago del Estero.

The department is the second largest in the province, but it has only about 28,000 inhabitants. The head town is Tostado (population 14,000). Other cities and towns are Esteban Rams, Gato Colorado, Gregoria Pérez de Denis, Juan de Garay, Logroño, Montefiore, Pozo Borrado, San Bernardo, Santa Margarita, and Villa Minetti.

The name of this department corresponds to the date of the Argentine Declaration of Independence (9 July 1816) and is often spelled with the actual figure 9 (Departamento 9 de Julio).
