= Ceres, Santa Fe =

Ceres
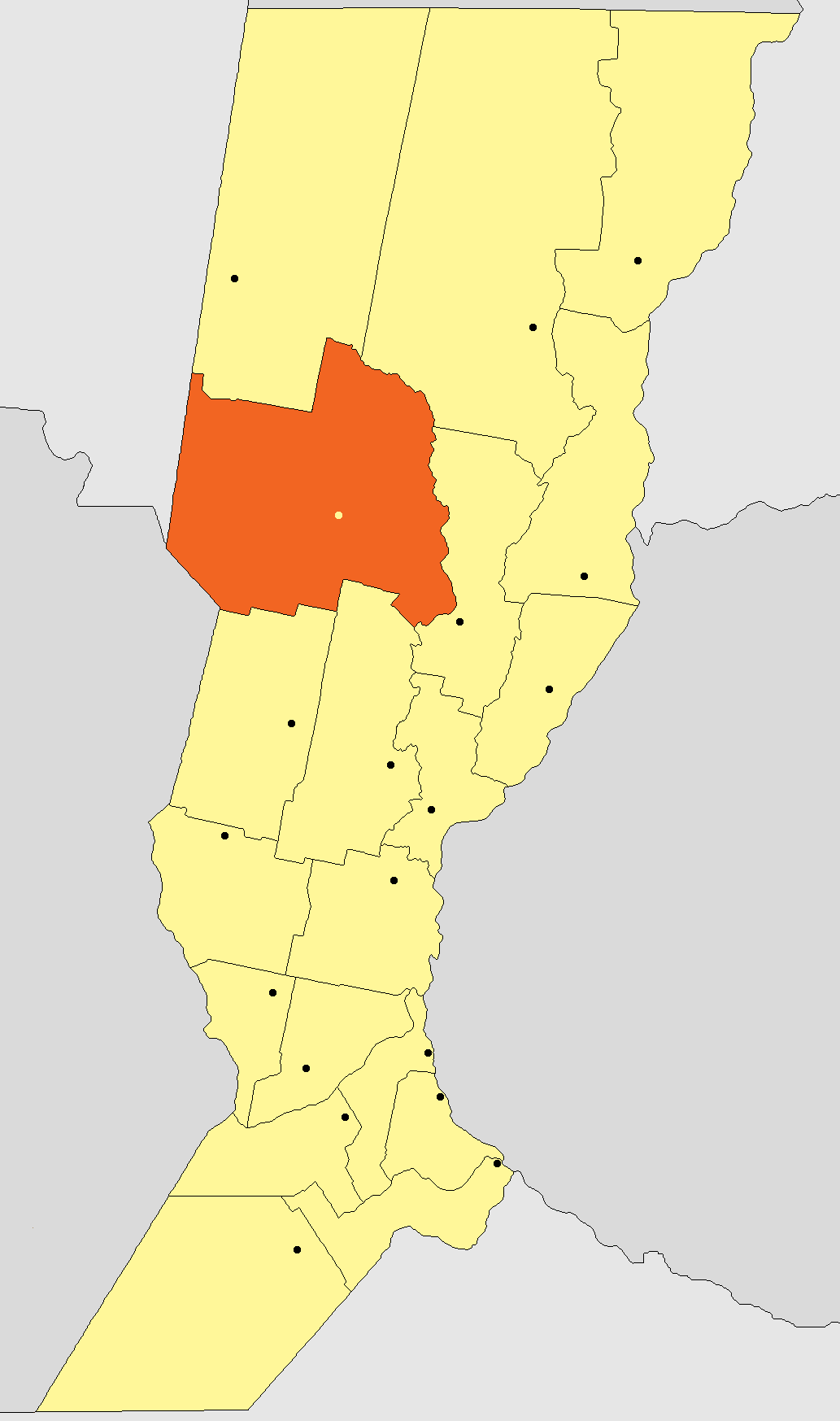
- Location of San Cristóbal Department within Santa Fe Province

- Location in Argentina
- Coordinates: 29°52′S 61°57′W
- Country: Argentina
- Province: Santa Fe
- Department: San Cristóbal
- Founded: 1892

Government
  - Intendente: Alejandra Dupouy (UCR)
- Elevation: 84 m (276 ft)

Population (2001 census [INDEC])
  - Total: 16,054
  - Density: 22.85/km^{2} (59.2/sq mi)
- CPA Base: S 2340
- Area code: +54 3491

Ceres is a municipality San Cristóbal Department, in Santa Fe Province, Argentina. The town of Ceres is 266 km (165 mi) northwest of the provincial capital Santa Fe and has a population of 16,054 2001 census [INDEC]

The town is situated 10 km (6 mi) from the border with Santiago del Estero Province, receiving a strong cultural, social and commercial influence from them.

Ceres sits on National Route 34 and Provincial Route 17. It has a railway connection on FCA (ex-Mitre) with frequent general cargo, mining, cereals, and passenger trains, taking a good portion of the products from the Argentine Northwest to the port of Rosario.

== Climate ==
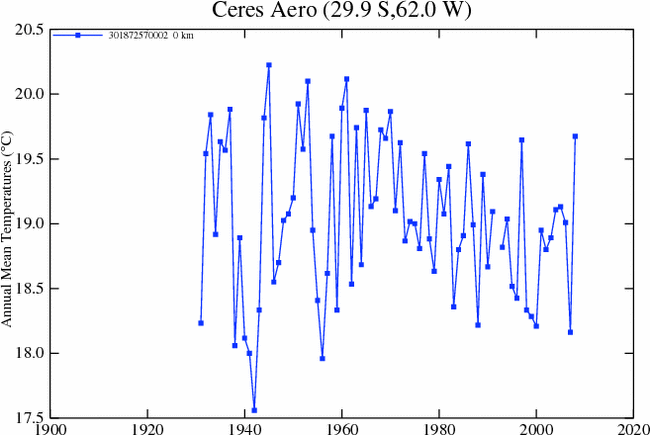
Average temperatures, 1931 to 2008 (NASA).

Ceres has a humid subtropical climate (Köppen climate classification Cwa) with mild, and dry winters and hot, humid summers. Winters are mild and windier, with a July high of 18.4 °C (65.1 °F) although nighttime temperatures are cool, with a July low of 6.7 °C (44.1 °F). During the summer, temperatures can be hot during the day, averaging 32.3 °C (90.1 °F) in January but nighttime temperatures are more pleasant and cooler, averaging below 20 °C (68.0 °F). Spring and fall are transition seasons featuring warm weather during the day and cool weather at nighttime. The first and last dates of frost are June 18 and August 14 respectively. The average annual precipitation is 942 millimetres (37 in), most of it being concentrated in the warmer months. On average, Ceres averages 2,650 hours of sunshine a year (or 59% of possible sunshine hours), ranging from a low of 49% in June to a high of 65% in February. The highest recorded temperature was 43.7 °C (110.7 °F) on January 4, 1963 while the lowest recorded temperature was −6.6 °C (20.1 °F) on July 13, 2000.

Climate data for Ceres (1991–2020, extremes 1931–present)
Month	Jan	Feb	Mar	Apr	May	Jun	Jul	Aug	Sep	Oct	Nov	Dec	Year
Record high °C (°F)	43.7 (110.7)	42.5 (108.5)	39.9 (103.8)	38.4 (101.1)	34.6 (94.3)	32.6 (90.7)	34.9 (94.8)	38.6 (101.5)	41.2 (106.2)	41.0 (105.8)	43.1 (109.6)	43.2 (109.8)	43.7 (110.7)
Mean daily maximum °C (°F)	32.3 (90.1)	31.1 (88.0)	29.3 (84.7)	25.5 (77.9)	22.0 (71.6)	19.4 (66.9)	19.1 (66.4)	22.2 (72.0)	24.5 (76.1)	27.1 (80.8)	29.3 (84.7)	31.4 (88.5)	26.1 (79.0)
Daily mean °C (°F)	25.5 (77.9)	24.3 (75.7)	22.5 (72.5)	19.1 (66.4)	15.5 (59.9)	12.7 (54.9)	11.6 (52.9)	14.0 (57.2)	16.7 (62.1)	20.0 (68.0)	22.4 (72.3)	24.6 (76.3)	19.1 (66.4)
Mean daily minimum °C (°F)	19.4 (66.9)	18.6 (65.5)	17.0 (62.6)	14.1 (57.4)	10.7 (51.3)	7.8 (46.0)	6.1 (43.0)	7.5 (45.5)	10.1 (50.2)	13.7 (56.7)	15.9 (60.6)	18.1 (64.6)	13.2 (55.8)
Record low °C (°F)	7.9 (46.2)	5.6 (42.1)	3.8 (38.8)	0.5 (32.9)	−5.8 (21.6)	−6.2 (20.8)	−6.6 (20.1)	−6.0 (21.2)	−2.6 (27.3)	1.4 (34.5)	3.8 (38.8)	5.0 (41.0)	−6.6 (20.1)
Average precipitation mm (inches)	140.0 (5.51)	116.8 (4.60)	147.3 (5.80)	101.1 (3.98)	39.7 (1.56)	18.8 (0.74)	8.4 (0.33)	12.0 (0.47)	31.3 (1.23)	80.5 (3.17)	106.4 (4.19)	140.9 (5.55)	943.2 (37.13)
Average precipitation days (≥ 0.1 mm)	8.7	8.0	8.6	8.4	6.0	4.7	3.3	2.8	4.8	8.0	8.8	8.9	80.9
Average relative humidity (%)	70.8	74.8	77.0	79.7	80.8	79.9	74.9	68.3	66.2	68.6	68.1	69.3	73.2
Mean monthly sunshine hours	291.4	245.8	235.6	192.0	167.4	141.0	179.8	213.9	216.0	241.8	279.0	285.2	2,688.9
Mean daily sunshine hours	9.4	8.7	7.6	6.4	5.4	4.7	5.8	6.9	7.2	7.8	9.3	9.2	7.4
Percentage possible sunshine	64	65	59	58	55	49	52	59	60	63	65	62	59
Source 1: Servicio Meteorológico Nacional
Source 2: NOAA (percent sun 1961–1990) Meteo Climat (record highs and lows), Oficina de Riesgo Agropecuario (record highs for February and May, and record lows for December)
