= La Capital Department, Santa Fe =

La Capital Department
- Department
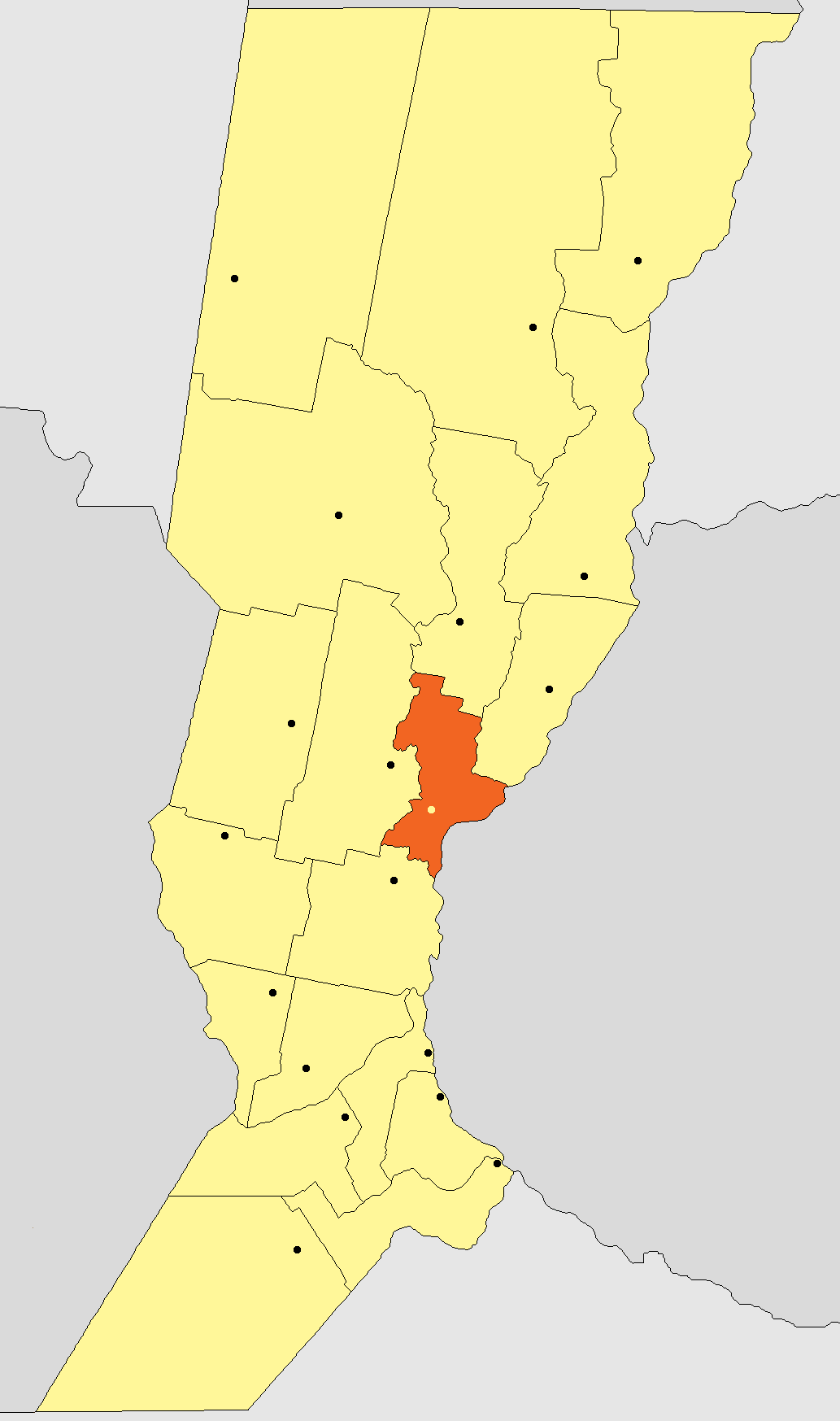
- Location of La Capital Department within Santa Fe Province
- Coordinates: 31°38′S 60°42′W
- Country: Argentina
- Province: Santa Fe
- Head town: Santa Fe

Area
  - Total: 3,055 km^{2} (1,180 sq mi)

Population
  - Total: 489,505
  - Density: 160.2/km^{2} (415.0/sq mi)
- Time zone: UTC-3 (ART)

The La Capital Department (in Spanish, Departamento La Capital, Spanish pronunciation: [depaɾtaˈmento la kapiˈtal]) is an administrative subdivision (departamento) of the province of Santa Fe, Argentina. It is located in the center-east of the province. It limits with the Paraná River in the east; and from there (going clockwise) with the departments of San Jerónimo (south), Las Colonias (west), San Justo (north) and Garay (northeast).

The department has about 490,000 inhabitants, making it the second most populated in the province after the Rosario Department. Its head town is Santa Fe, which is also the provincial capital (population 370,000). Other cities and towns are Arroyo Aguiar, Arroyo Leyes, Cabal, Campo Andino, Emilia, Gobernador Candioti, Laguna Paiva, Llambi Campbell, Monte Vera, Nelson, Recreo, San José del Rincón, Santo Tomé, and Sauce Viejo.
