= Helvetica (disambiguation) =

Helvetica is a typeface developed in 1957.

It can also refer to:

- Helvetica (film), a documentary about the typeface
- Helvetic Republic, a Swiss state existing from 1798 to 1803
- Confoederatio Helvetica, the Latin name for Switzerland

== See also ==
- Helvetic (disambiguation)
- Helvetia (disambiguation)
- Switzerland in the Roman era
