= Fortín Olmos =

- Town
- Location of Fortín Olmos in Argentina
- Coordinates: 28.7833323°S 60.6920878°W
- Country: Argentina
- Province: Santa Fe
- Department: Vera
- Time zone: UTC−3 (ART)

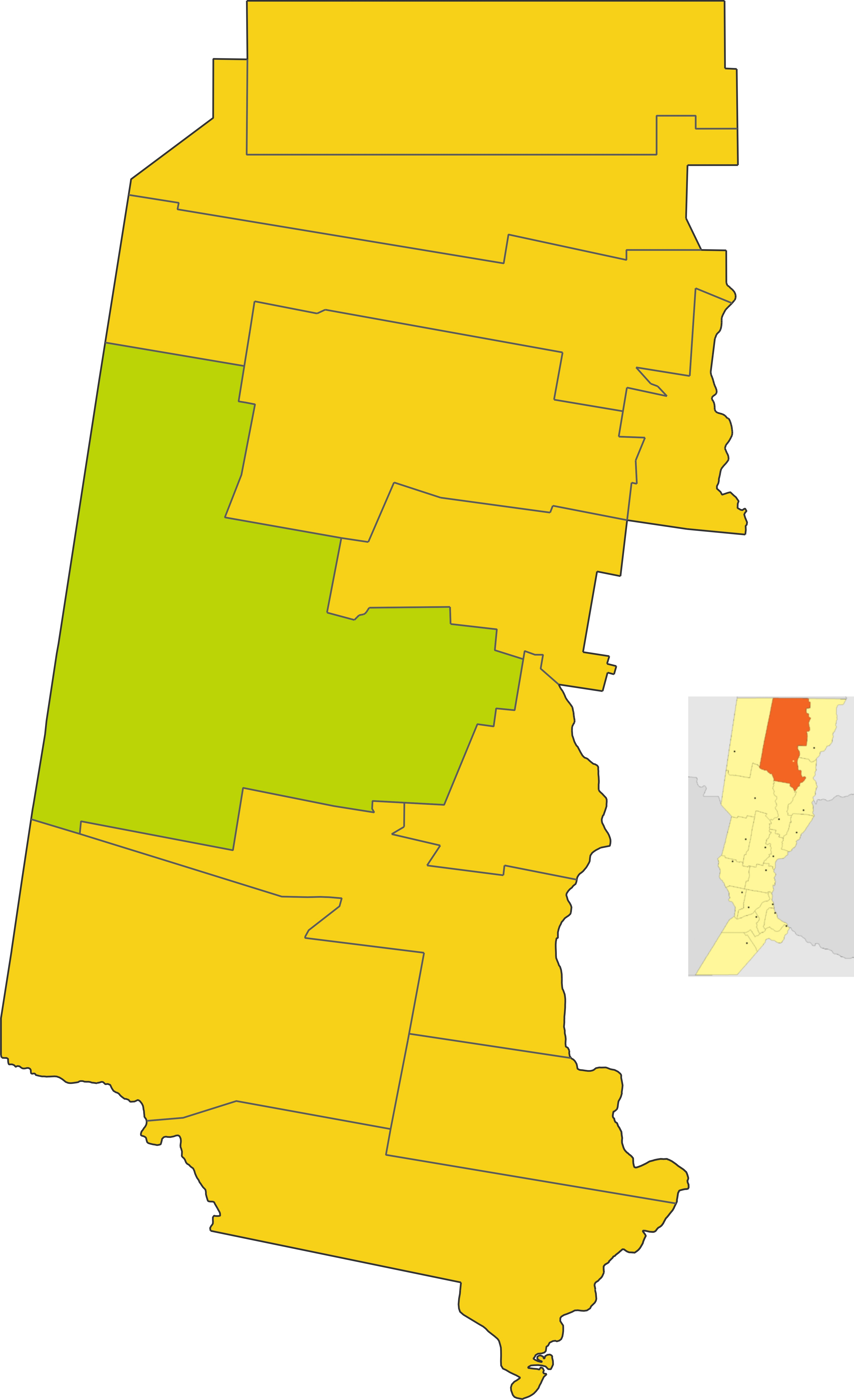

Fortín Olmos is a commune from Vera Department, Santa Fe Province, Argentina. It is located 326 km north from the province's capital, Santa Fe, Argentina.

== Population ==
Fortín Olmos has a population of 3,316, which is a 11% decrease from the previous 2001 census of 3,738.

== History ==
On November 13, 1864 the commune was created by Manuel Obligado (es). Originally, the town was built near a fort. The commune gets its name from General Olmos, who was an assistant of Manuel Obligado.

Starting in 1964, the closure of La Forestal (es), and the lack of drinkable water has slowed down the growth of Fortin Olmos. Currently, the main industry in Fortin Olmos is Cattle raising.
