= Vera Department =

- Department
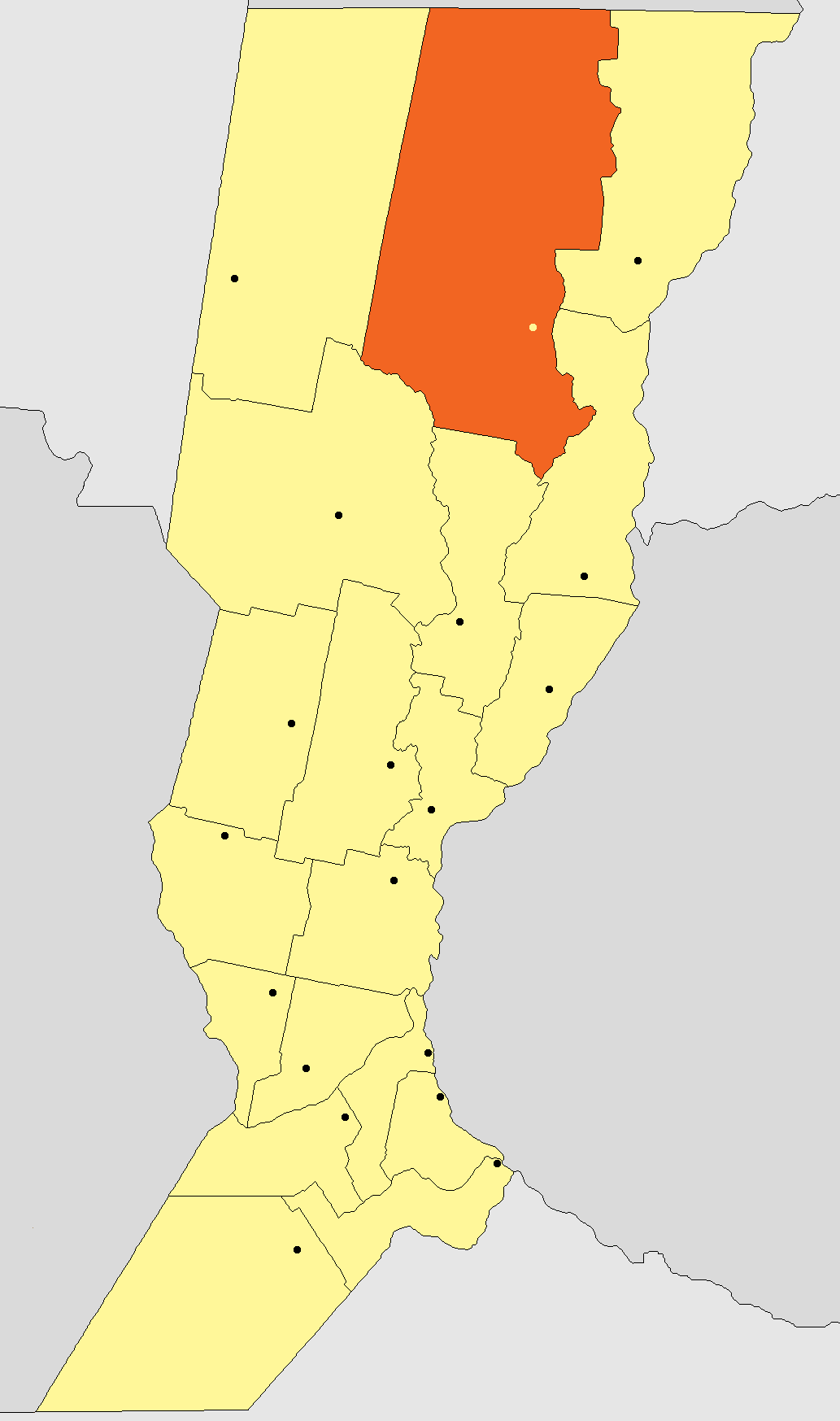
- Location of Vera Department within Santa Fe Province
- Coordinates: 29°28′S 60°13′W
- Country: Argentina
- Province: Santa Fe
- Head town: Vera

Area
  - Total: 21,096 km^{2} (8,145 sq mi)

Population
  - Total: 51,303
  - Density: 2.4319/km^{2} (6.2985/sq mi)
- Time zone: UTC-3 (ART)

The Vera Department (in Spanish, Departamento Vera) is an administrative subdivision (departamento) of the province of Santa Fe, Argentina. It is located in the center-north of the province. It limits Chaco Province to the north, and the departments of General Obligado (east), San Javier (south-east), San Justo (south), San Cristóbal (south-west), and Nueve de Julio (west).

The Vera Department is the largest department in Santa Fe but also one of the least densely populated, as is true in the north of the province as a whole. It has over 51,000 inhabitants. Its head town is Vera (population 20,000). Other cities and towns are Calchaquí, Cañada Ombú, Fortín Olmos, Garabato, Golondrina, Intiyaco, La Gallareta, Los Amores, Margarita, Tartagal, and Toba.
