= Garay Department =

Administrative subdivision of the province of Santa Fe, Argentina

- Department
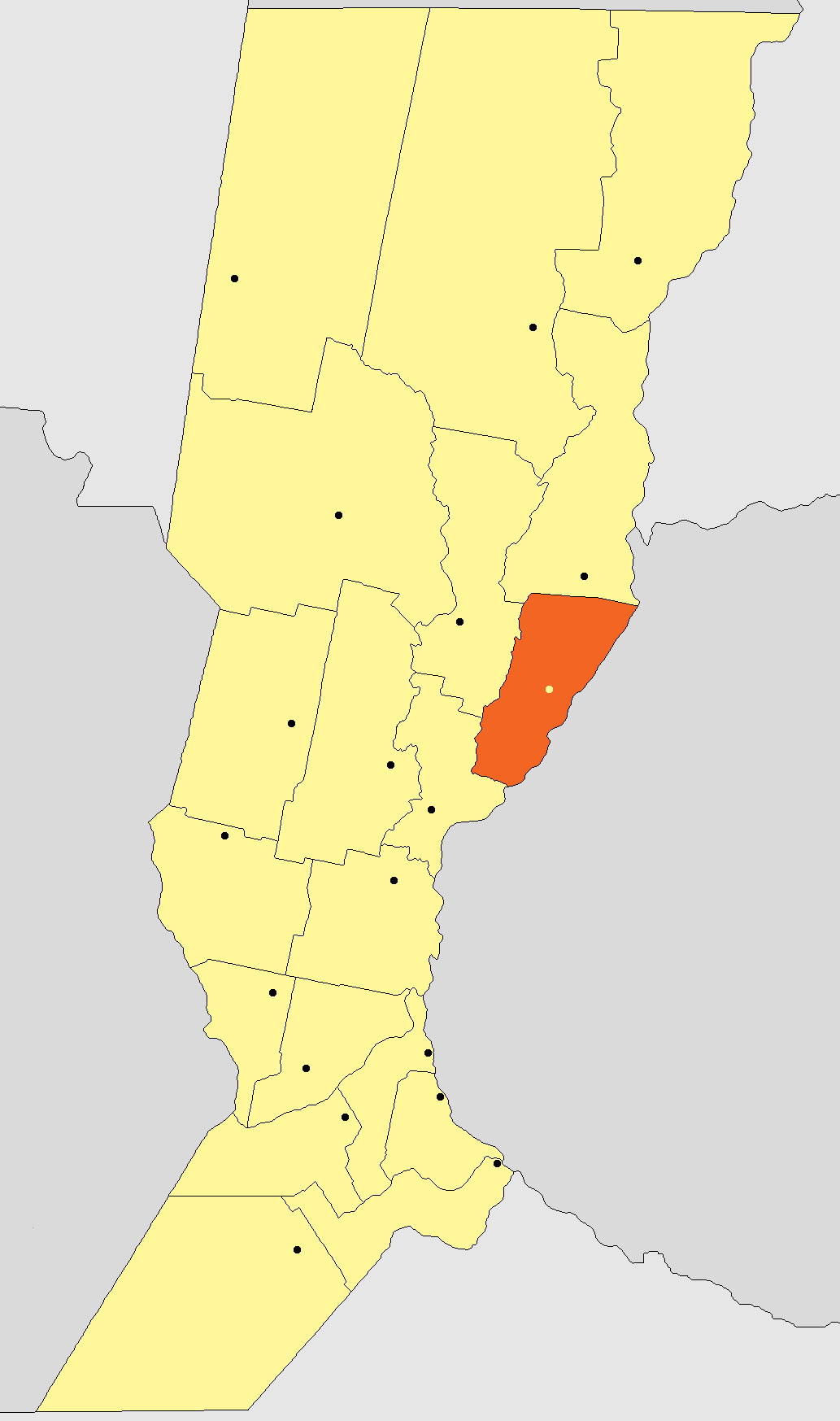
- Location of Garay Department within Santa Fe Province
- Coordinates: 31°06′S 60°05′W
- Country: Argentina
- Province: Santa Fe
- Head town: Helvecia

Area
  - Total: 3,964 km^{2} (1,531 sq mi)

Population
  - Total: 19,913
  - Density: 5.023/km^{2} (13.01/sq mi)
- Time zone: UTC-3 (ART)

The Garay Department (in Spanish, Departamento Garay) is an administrative subdivision (departamento) of the province of Santa Fe, Argentina. It is located in the center-east of the province. It has about 20,000 inhabitants as per the 2001 census [INDEC]. Its head town is the city of Helvecia (population 8,500). It is the least populated in the province.

Its neighbouring departments are San Javier in the north, San Justo in the west, and La Capital in the south. The eastern limit is marked by the Paraná River, which is the natural border with the province of Entre Ríos.

The towns and cities in this department are (in alphabetical order): Cayastá, Colonia Mascías, Helvecia, Saladero Mariano Cabal, and Santa Rosa de Calchines.
