= Vera, Santa Fe =

Vera
- City
- Location of Vera in Argentina
- Coordinates: 29°28′S 60°13′W
- Country: Argentina
- Province: Santa Fe
- Department: Vera

Government
  - Intendant: Paula Mitre (UCR)

Area
  - Total: 1,657 km^{2} (640 sq mi)

Population (2010 census)
  - Total: 19,185
  - Density: 11.58/km^{2} (29.99/sq mi)
- Demonym: verense
- Time zone: UTC−3 (ART)
- CPA base: S3550
- Dialing code: +54 3483

Vera is a city in the north of the province of Santa Fe, Argentina. It is the head town of the Vera Department and lies 256 km from the provincial capital (Santa Fe). It has a population of about 20,000 inhabitants (2001 census [INDEC]).

The town was founded in 1891 by M. Leiva and E. Alemán, soon after the arrival of the Ferrocarril Provincial de Santa Fe in February 1890, and became a city on 24 June 1954.
