= Helvete =

Helvete can refer to:

- Helvete, the Swedish and Norwegian word for hell
- Helvete (album), album by Swedish band Nasum
- Helvete (store), record shop in Oslo, Norway, related to the early Norwegian black metal scene

== See also ==
- Helvetic
