= Mariano Moreno bus station =

Bus station in Rosario, Argentina

Coordinates: 32.9394°S 60.6714°W

Mariano Moreno bus station Terminal de Ómnibus Mariano Moreno
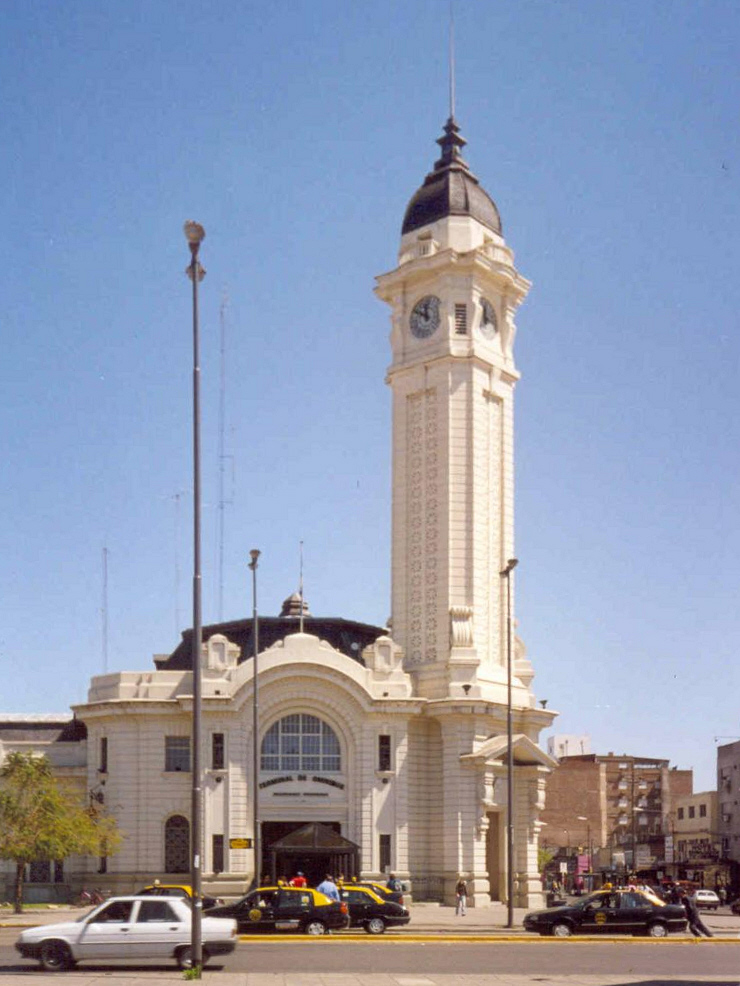
- Front of the building.

General information
- Location: Santa Fe 3610, Rosario; Argentina
- Owner: Municipality of Rosario

Construction
- Parking: Yes

Other information
- Website: terminalrosario.gov.ar

History
- Opened: 1 December 1950; 75 years ago
Location

Mariano Moreno bus station (Terminal de Ómnibus Mariano Moreno in Spanish) is a former railway station and current bus station located in the city of Rosario in Santa Fe Province, Argentina. The station receives near 340,000 buses a year (930 services per day) with an average of 13,500,000 people transported within a year (37,000 passengers per day), being the most important station not only of Rosario but other cities around.

The station is located in the central-west region of the city, 3 km. from downtown Rosario. It has services such as bar, fast food restaurant, coffeehouses and other stores. Other services include parking lots, a bank and cash dispensers, a courier, a newsagent's shop, and accessible toilets. Buses daily depart to the main cities of Argentina and bordering countries.

== History ==
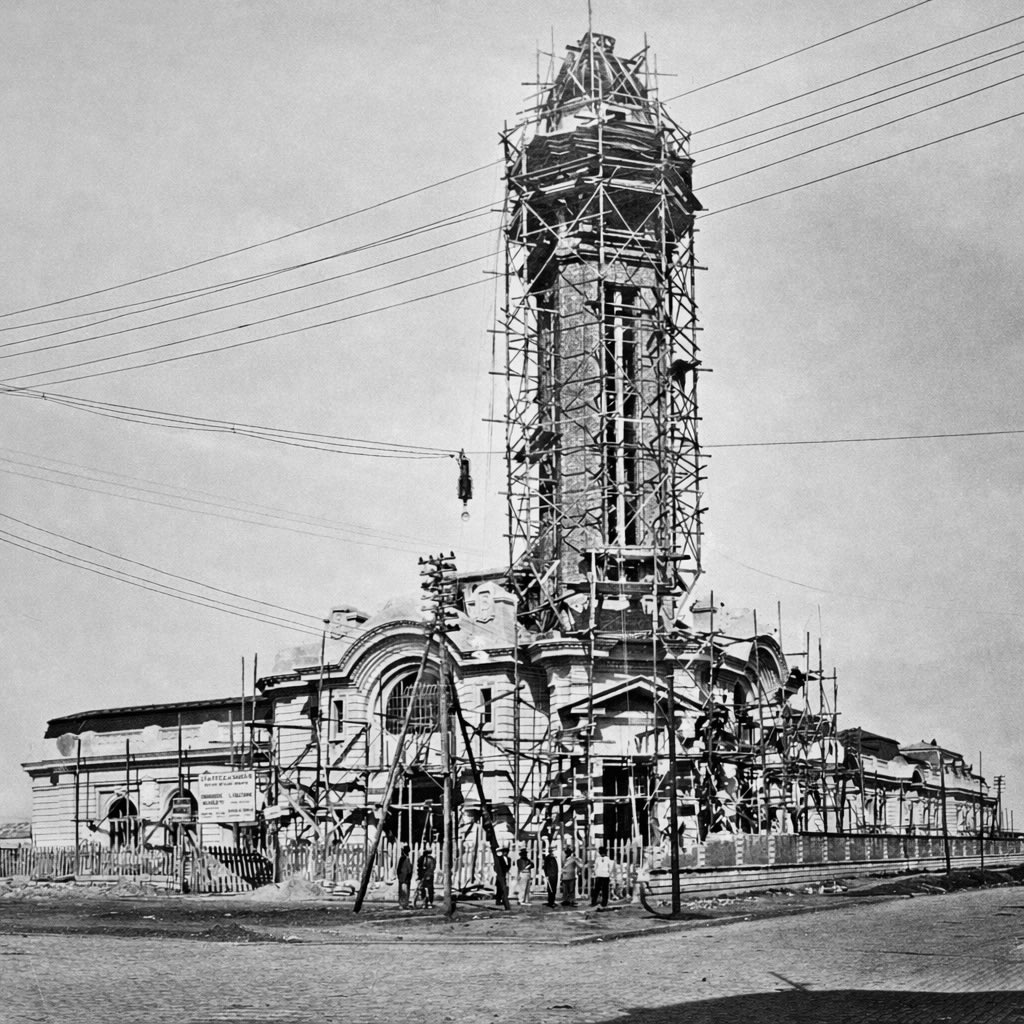
he original railway station building during construction, 1928

The building was projected by architects Enrique Chanourdie and Mr. Micheletti, and carried out by construction company Falcone. Works began in December 1927 with the intention to build a railway station for the Province of Santa Fe Railway on the corner of Santa Fe and Cafferata streets of Rosario. The building was finished in 1929.

When the whole Argentine railway network was nationalised during Juan Perón's presidency, some stations in Rosario were taken over by the state-owned Mitre Railway and others by Belgrano Railway, two divisions part of recently created Ferrocarriles Argentinos. Other stations were also closed to reduce costs. Therefore, the PSFR station was disregarded to operate trains in the city. Nevertheless, in December 1950 it was inaugurated as a bus terminal, being named "Presidente Perón".

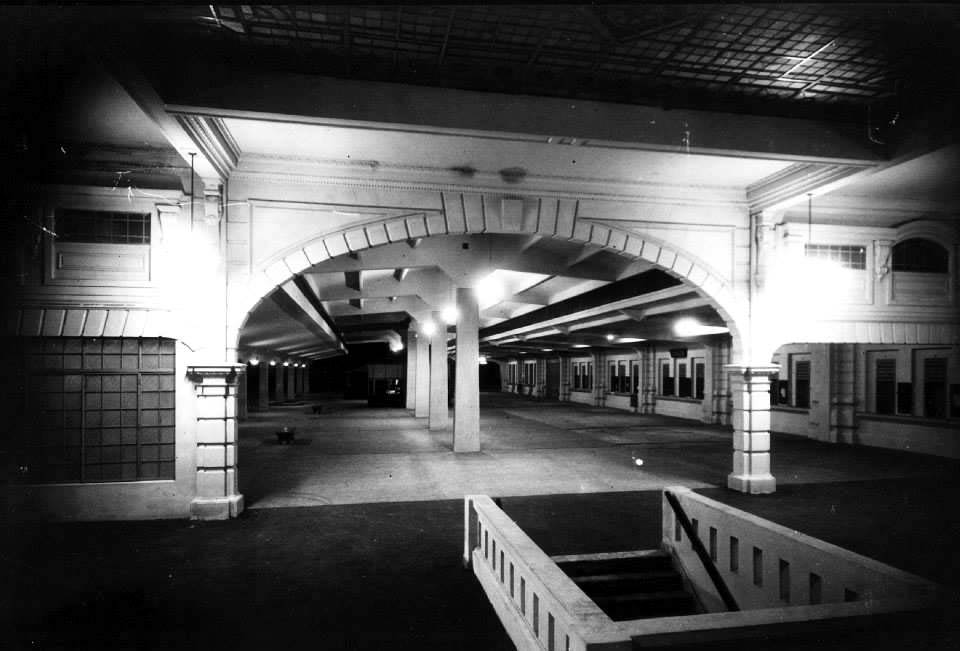
Entrance to the interior room with ticket offices at background, few months to be opened, 1950

In 1955, the Revolución Libertadora that overthrew the government of Juan Perón suppressed his name from all public institutions and buildings, so the station was renamed "Estaciòn de Ómnibus Rosario", until 1957 when its name changed once again to "Mariano Moreno" in honor of one of the ideologues of the May Revolution.

In May 2010 the station was restructured, at a cost of A$ 20 million. Works include the demolition of some stores, new road access, construction of additional toilettes and ticket offices. The first stage was finished in October 2011. and the second stage in July 2012. By 2013 the cost of the works had increased to A$40 million, 20 given by the Municipality and the rest by merchants in Rosario.

Total refurbishment of the building was finally inaugurated in June 2014. Facilities added included 50 new ticket offices, 50 platforms, a food court of 2,300 m^{2}, and waiting rooms. The new areas occupied a total of 12,000 m^{2}.

== Historic operators ==
Served as	Operator	Period
Railway station	Province of Santa Fe Railway	1929–1948
Bus station	Municipality of Rosario	1950–present
