= General Obligado Department =

- Department
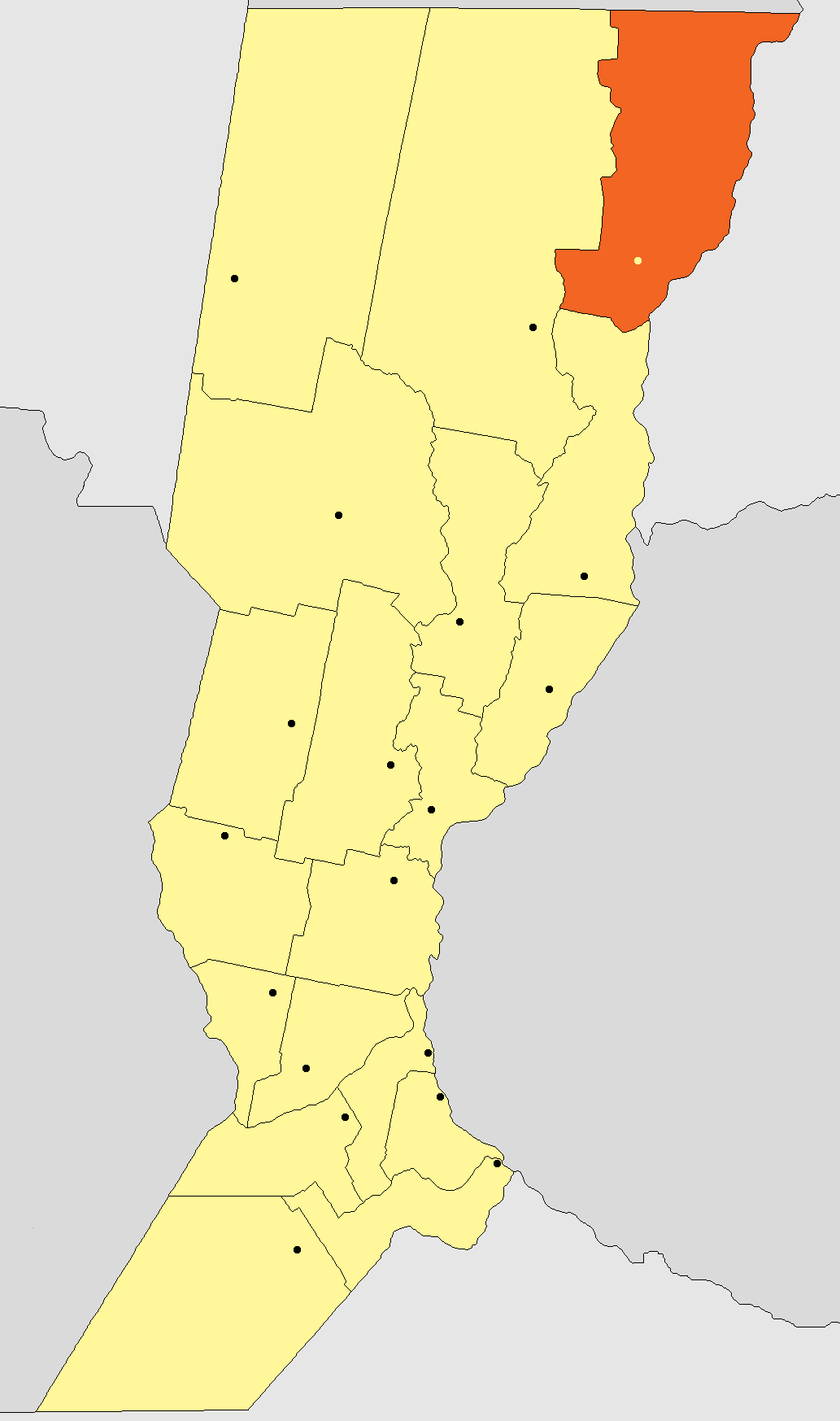
- Location of General Obligado Department within Santa Fe Province
- Coordinates: 29°40′S 59°12′W
- Country: Argentina
- Province: Santa Fe
- Head town: Reconquista

Area
  - Total: 10,928 km^{2} (4,219 sq mi)

Population
  - Total: 197,986
  - Density: 18.117/km^{2} (46.924/sq mi)
- Time zone: UTC-3 (ART)

The General Obligado Department (in Spanish, Departamento General Obligado) is an administrative subdivision (departamento) of the province of Santa Fe, Argentina. It is located in the northeast of the province. It has about 197,000 inhabitants as per the 2022 census [INDEC]. Its head town is the city of Reconquista (population 84,939).

The department is located on the northeastern "corner" of Santa Fe, bordered by the Vera Department in the west and the San Javier Department in the south. In the north it limits with the province of Chaco, and in the east, with the Paraná River, which is the natural border with the province of Corrientes.

== Districts ==
The towns and cities in this department are (in alphabetical order): Arroyo Ceibal, Avellaneda, Berna, El Arazá, El Rabón, El Sombrerito, Florencia, Guadalupe Norte, Ingeniero Chanourdie, Hardy, La Sarita, Lanteri, Las Garzas, Las Toscas, Los Laureles, Malabrigo, Nicanor E. Molinas, Reconquista, San Antonio de Obligado, Tacuarendí, Villa Ana, Villa Guillermina, Villa Ocampo.
