= San Justo Department, Santa Fe =

San Justo Department
- Department
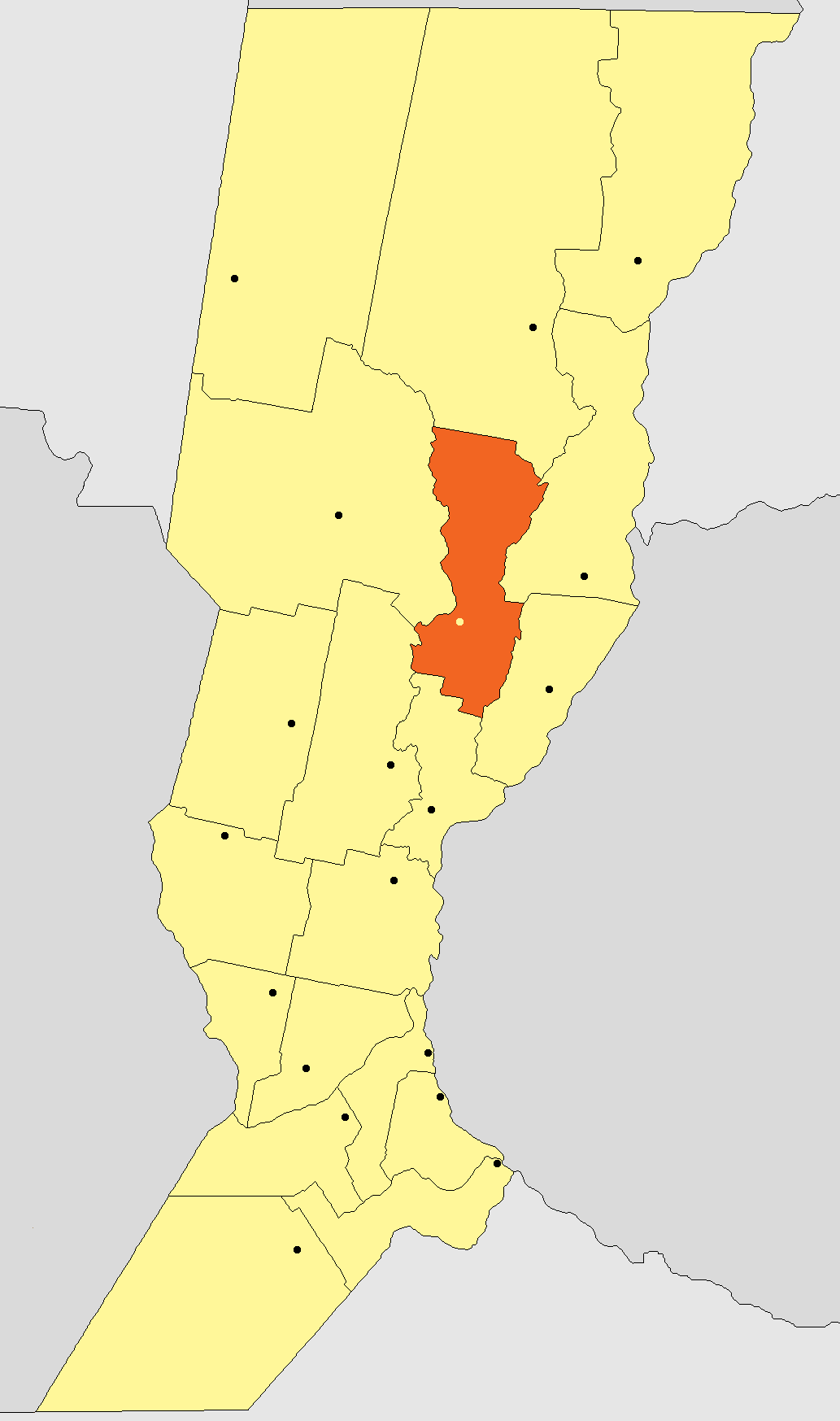
- Location of San Justo Department within Santa Fe Province
- Coordinates: 30°47′S 60°35′W
- Country: Argentina
- Province: Santa Fe
- Head town: San Justo

Area
  - Total: 5,575 km^{2} (2,153 sq mi)

Population
  - Total: 40,379
  - Density: 7.243/km^{2} (18.76/sq mi)
- Time zone: UTC-3 (ART)

The San Justo Department (in Spanish, Departamento San Justo) is an administrative subdivision (departamento) of the province of Santa Fe, Argentina. It is located in the center-north of the province. Starting from the north and going clockwise, it limits with the departments of Vera, San Javier, Garay, La Capital, Las Colonias, and San Cristóbal. San Justo is thus one of only three provincial departments that do not share a border with another province.

The department has about 40,000 inhabitants, which are distributed in 18 districts. The head town is San Justo (population 22,000). The others are Angeloni, Cayastacito, Colonia Dolores, Colonia Esther, Gobernador Crespo, La Camila, La Criolla, La Penca y Caraguatá, Marcelino Escalada, Naré, Pedro Gómez Cello, Ramayón, San Bernardo, San Martín Norte, Silva, Vera y Pintado, and Videla.
