= San Justo, Santa Fe =

San Justo
- City
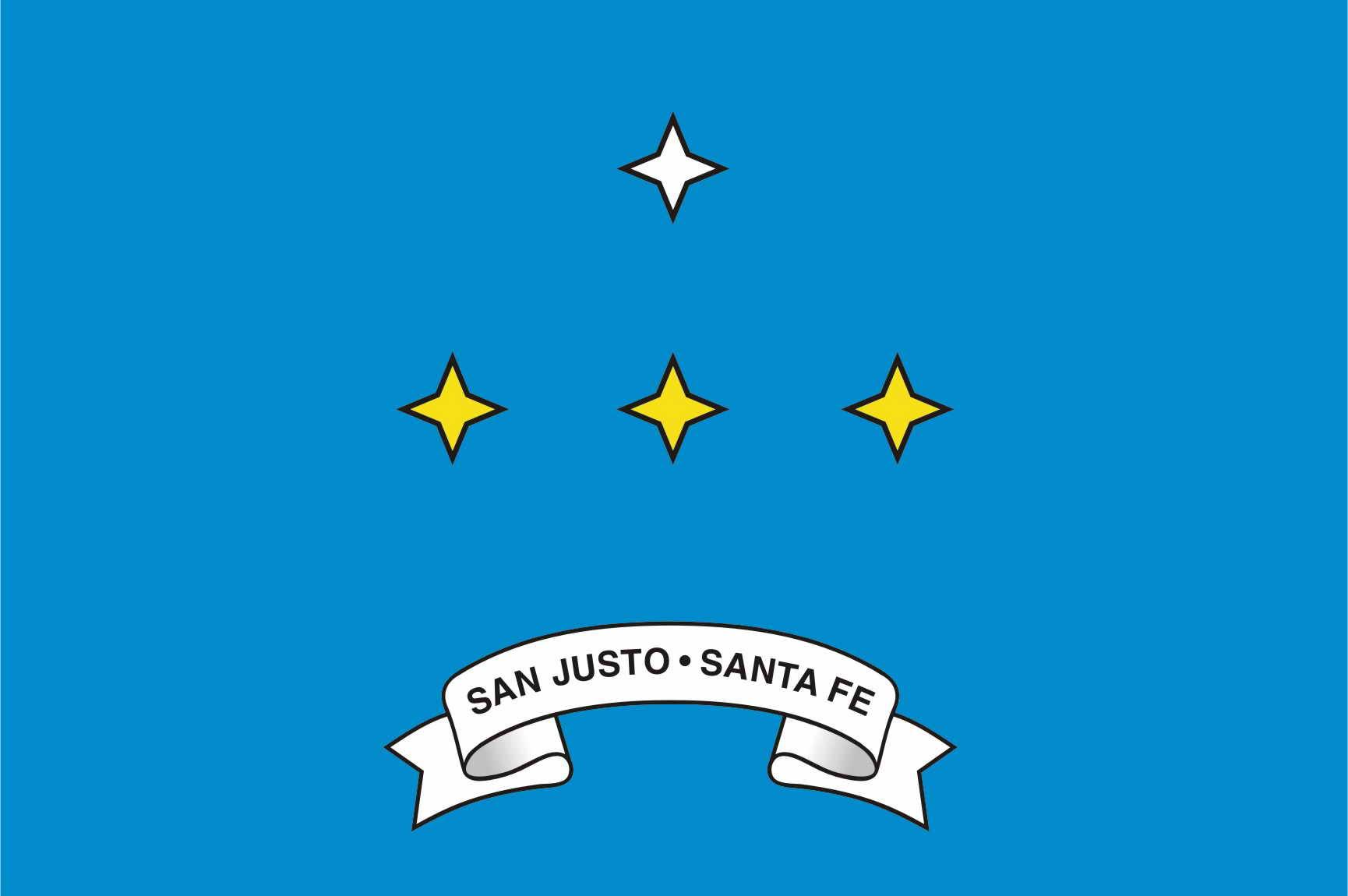
- Flag

- Location of San Justo in Argentina
- Coordinates: 30°47′S 60°35′W
- Country: Argentina
- Province: Santa Fe
- Department: San Justo

Government
  - Intendant: Nicolás Cuesta (UCR)

Area
  - Total: 790 km^{2} (310 sq mi)

Population (2010)
  - Total: 21,624
  - Density: 27/km^{2} (71/sq mi)
- Time zone: UTC−3 (ART)
- CPA base: S3040
- Dialing code: +54 3498

San Justo is a city in the center region of the province of Santa Fe, Argentina, 99 km north from the provincial capital. It had about 22,000 inhabitants at the 2010 census [INDEC] and it is the head town of the San Justo Department.

Founded in 1868 by Mariano Cabal, San Justo attained the status of a comuna (commune) on 13 July 1887 and the following year the Ferrocarril Provincial de Santa Fe arrived on 1 September 1888. It became a city on 17 September 1959.

== 1973 tornado ==
On 10 January 1973, a destructive and deadly F5 tornado tore through San Justo. It killed 63 people and injured over 300.

== Sources ==
- Municipal information: Municipal Affairs Federal Institute (IFAM), Municipal Affairs Secretariat, Ministry of Interior, Argentina. (in Spanish)
- "San Justo, Santa Fe". Santa Fe provincial government.
