= Romang, Santa Fe =

Romang
- City and municipality
- Flag

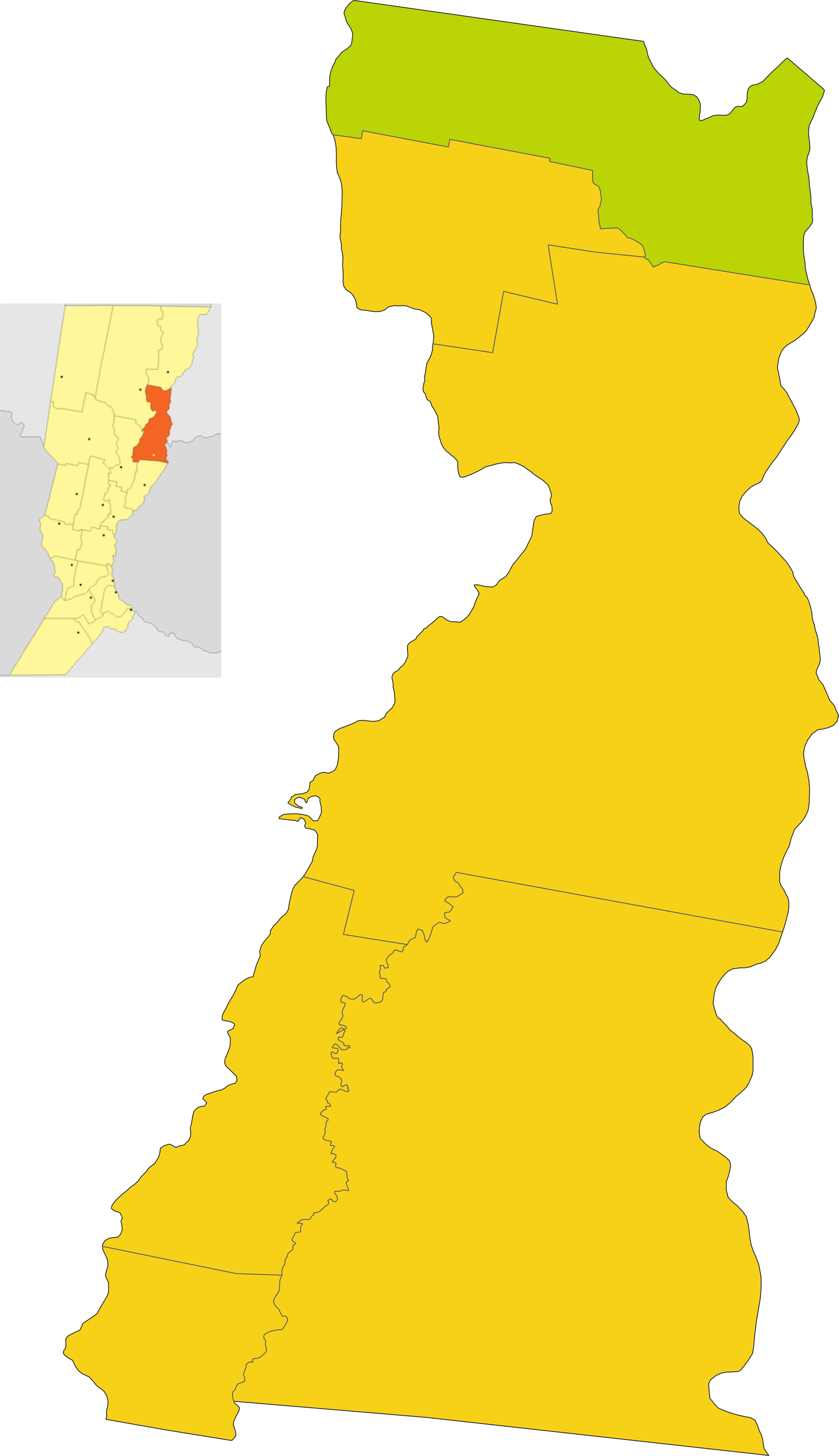
- Location of Romang Municipality in San Javier Department
- Coordinates: 29°30′00″S 59°46′00″W
- Country: Argentina
- Province: Santa Fe
- Department: San Javier

Government
  - Intendant: Sergio Ramseyer (UCR)

Population (2012 estimate)
  - Total: 9,237
- Postal code: 3555
- Website: www.romang.gov.ar

Romang is a municipality located in San Javier, Santa Fe Province, Argentina. The town is located 265 kilometres (165 mi) north of the provincial capital Santa Fe on Provincial Route 1.

== Economy ==
Romang's economy centers around agriculture, livestock, and industry. Two notable businesses are Susarelli, a rice mill with national distribution, and API, a steel foundry and car-part manufacturer that ships throughout the country. Romang's economy is also supplemented by tourism from sport fishing and a large camping ground, Camping Communal Brisol, located along the river.

Romang is also home to two athletic clubs, Club Matienzo and Club Romang, that compete in the Reconquista Soccer League of Santa Fe.

== Climate and geography ==
On average, Romang has about one low impact earthquake every 50 years, usually of magnitude less than 5 on the Richter Scale. Extreme droughts are a rare occurrence and there is a medium to high flood risk.

Romang has a humid (> 0.65 p/pet) climate. Its lands are uncultivated, with most of its natural vegetation intact. Most of the land is covered either in vegetation or cropland. The climate is a humid subtropical one, meaning there is a hot summer but no dry season, with a subtropical dry forest. The soil in the area is high in planosols, soils common in flat areas, with seasonal saturation caused by an impermeable lower horizon.

Because of its subtropical climate, Romang has few dry spells with hot summers (average 29 °C) and mild winters (12 °C). It experiences a long frost-free period, due to its notable moisture content from wind coming from the South Atlantic. Annual rainfall average is 900–1100 mm.

== History and creation ==
The Commune of Romang was created on January 28, 1887. On April 23, 1873, the people of Romang were summoned by the controversial figure Peter Wingeyer from Trubschachen. Wingeyer had been accused of stealing money entrusted to him for orphans, so he fled to America with his two sons. On the trip, he bought a passport from a doctor named Theophilus Romang (who died on the trip) from Langnau. Wingeyer was a clerk, and the owner of a watch factory which became bankrupt. From Esperanza, he moved to Argentina, where he practiced medicine illegally during the 1860s.

Wingeyer was presented to the provincial government and states with the hope that it would be a large scale farm. It is on public land that exists in the field of Malabrigo, on the coast of Rio San Javier.

After receiving a complaint about Wingeyer, the provincial government ordered the topographical department to carry out a report (March 27, 1871). On March 15, 1872, the department appointed topographic surveyor, Emilio Goupillaut, to practice the operation said "taking as its starting point at the confluence of the South Stream, [sic] The Worm, property boundary dividing Thompson Bonar and Co."

The main reason that led to its creation was the idea of colonizing, given the undeniable wealth of the land and its excellent capacity for agricultural work. Also noted were logging activities and the apparent protection of livestock, seriously threatened by the continuous raids of the tribes "and Toba Mocovíes", from the Chaco, committing all kinds of theft and looting.

Romang was one of the few colonies of foreigners in the country which, in the beginning, had to protect the first homes built within a fence. Generally people were found around forts or military barracks, ensuring peace and tranquility necessary for development and progress.

The population was gradually formed with the arrival of its founding in 1873, including settler families with some Italian, French and Swiss, and Germans. Wingeyer tried to comply with the government to bring 200 families within two years. Romang was originally named San Geronimo (in the Jesuit era) and subsequently Malabrigo from 1845-1855, at which point it received the name which it uses today.

The official plotting town there was dated July 1925, made by the engineer Juan C. Kuriger. After the number of people grew and the population expanded, there were several facts that contributed to progress. These included the navigation of streams to connect to the Paraná. Communicating this way with ports and towns, particularly Corner (Corrientes), helped maintain a regular traffic with this port.
