= USS Helvetia =

Patrol vessel of the United States Navy

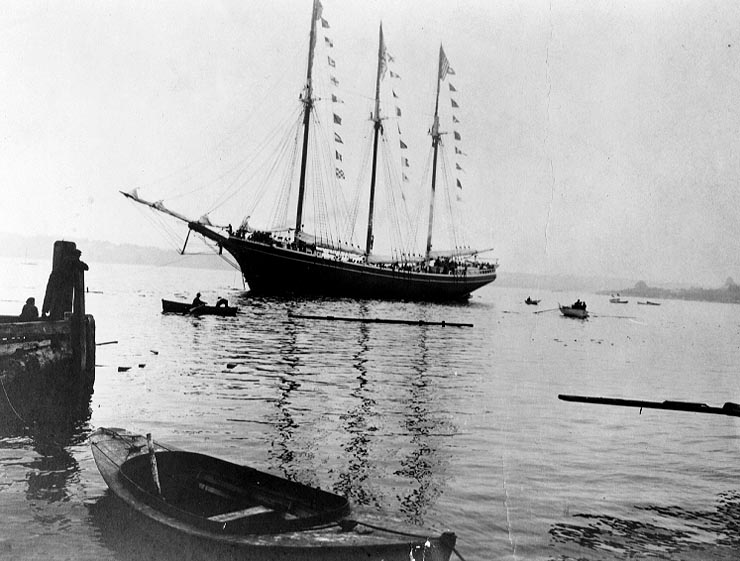
- Helvetia as a civilian schooner sometime between 1905 and 1918.

History

United States
- Name: USS Helvetia
- Namesake: Previous name retained
- Builder: I. L. Snow & Company, Rockland, Maine
- Completed: 1905
- Acquired: 19 July 1918
- Commissioned: 19 July 1918
- Fate: Sold February 1919
- Notes: Operated as civilian schooner Helvetia 1905-1918 and from 1919

General characteristics
- Type: Patrol vessel
- Tonnage: 499 Gross register tons
- Length: 157 ft 4 in (47.96 m)
- Beam: 36 ft 2 in (11.02 m)
- Draft: 12 ft (3.7 m)

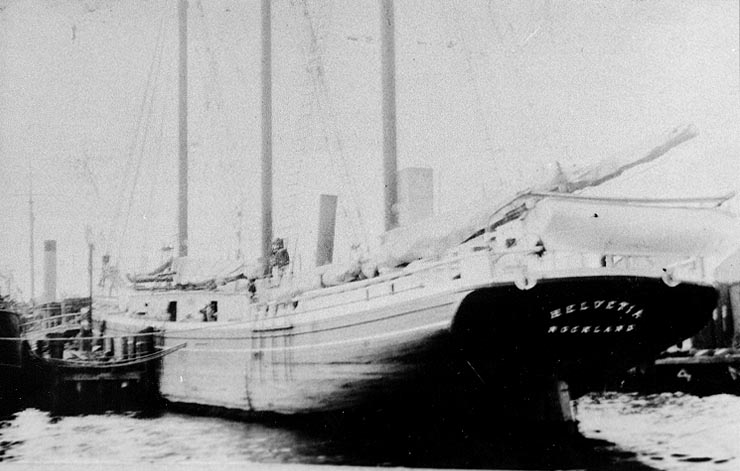
Helvetia as a civilian schooner prior to her United States Navy service, probably in July 1918 when she was inspected for possible naval service.

USS Helvetia (SP-3096) was a United States Navy patrol vessel in commission from 1918 to 1919.

Helvetia was built as a civilian three-masted schooner of the same name in 1905 by I. L. Snow & Company at Rockland, Maine. The U.S. Navy inspected her in July 1918 for possible naval service and purchased her on 19 July 1918 from R. K. Snow for use as a section patrol boat during World War I. She was commissioned the same day at Norfolk, Virginia, as USS Helvetia (SP-3096).

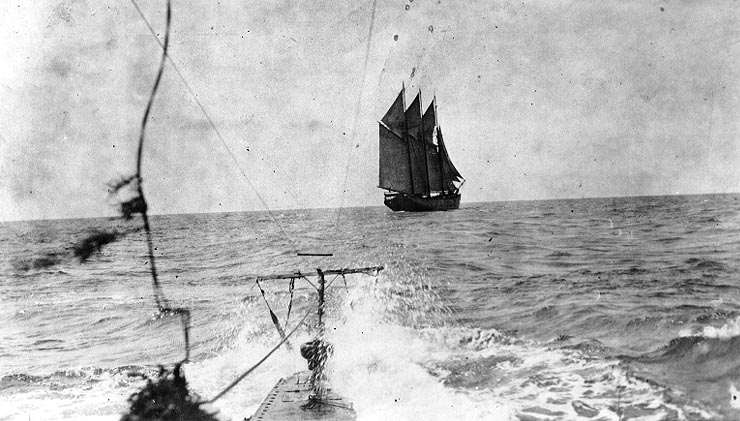
USS Helvetia (SP-3096) under full sail while operating as a decoy ship during an antisubmarine patrol against German submarines off the United States East Coast in 1918. The photograph was taken from the U.S. Navy submarine USS E-2 (Submarine No. 25).

Assigned to the 5th Naval District, Helvetia initially was deployed as a decoy ship teamed with a U.S. Navy submarine following her during antisubmarine patrols off the United States East Coast. It was hoped that her innocent appearance would lure unsuspecting German submarines to the surface to attack her with gunfire, allowing the submerged U.S. Navy submarine nearby to torpedo and sink them.

Helvetia did, in fact, encounter a German submarine, SM U-117, on 17 August 1918 approximately 150 nautical miles east of Norfolk, Virginia, immediately after the U-boat had sunk the Norwegian barge, Nordhav. The Helvetia, along with the American submarine USS E-2 in tow, was recognized by the Germans as a trap and U-117 submerged, and fled. The Helvetia did not have the opportunity to make an attack on the submarine, nor did it aid the survivors of the Nordhav.

Helvetia later served as a stores ship and mother ship for submarines at Norfolk until November 1918. She then was transferred to New London, Connecticut, for similar duties there with the submarine force of the United States Atlantic Fleet.

The Navy sold Helvetia back to R. K. Snow in February 1919.

== Bibliography ==
- Beyer, Edward F. & Beyer, Kenneth M. (1991). "U. S. Navy Mystery Ships". Warship International. XXVIII (4). International Naval Research Organization: 322–372. ISSN 0043-0374.
- Etzold, Dominic (2023). Reaping the Whirlwind: The U-Boat War off North America During WWI. Atglen: Schiffer Military History. ISBN 978-0-7643-6704-5
- (entry accidentally truncated and merged with that of the first USS Henderson (AP-1))
- Haze Gray & Underway Helvetia (corrected version of Dictionary of American Naval Fighting Ships entry)
