= Santurce, Argentina =

Santurce
- Locality
- Location of Santurce in Argentina
- Coordinates: 30°11′11″S 61°10′58″W
- Country: Argentina
- Province: Santa Fe
- Department: San Cristóbal

Population (2010)
  - Total: 32
- Time zone: UTC−3 (ART)
- CPA base: S3070

Santurce is a commune in the San Cristóbal Department, in the province of Santa Fe, Argentina.

== Population ==
It has 32 census [INDEC] inhabitants, which represents a decrease of 22% from the 41 census [INDEC] the previous census.

Historical population
Year	Pop.	±%
1991	36	—
2001	41	+13.9%
2010	32	−22.0%
Source: Fuente de los Censos Nacionales del INDEC
