= San Cristóbal Department =

- Department
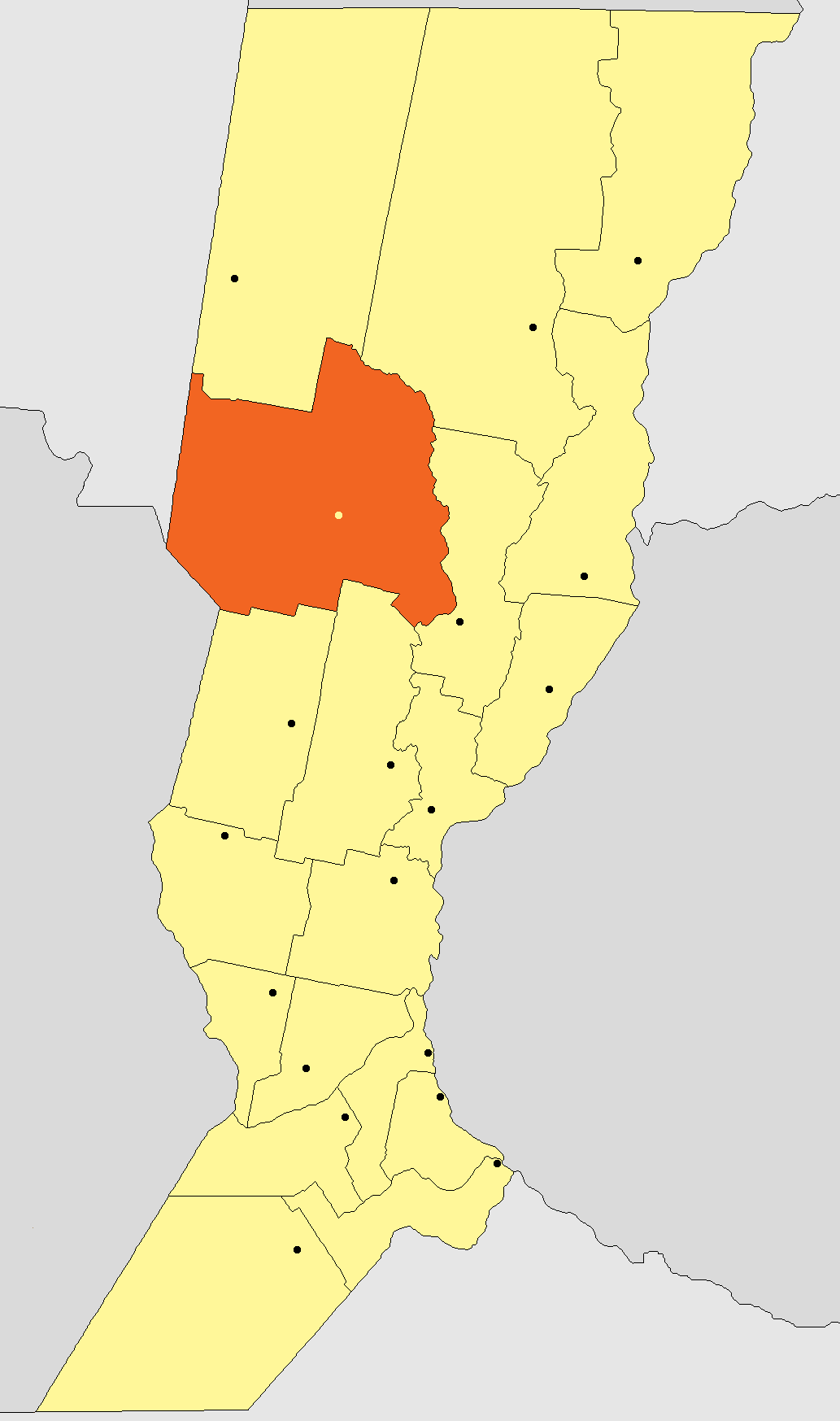
- Location of San Cristóbal Department within Santa Fe Province
- Coordinates: 30°19′S 61°14′W
- Country: Argentina
- Province: Santa Fe
- Head town: San Cristóbal

Area
  - Total: 14,850 km^{2} (5,730 sq mi)

Population
  - Total: 64,935
  - Density: 4.373/km^{2} (11.33/sq mi)
- Time zone: UTC-3 (ART)

The San Cristóbal Department (in Spanish, Departamento San Cristóbal) is an administrative subdivision (departamento) of the province of Santa Fe, Argentina. It is located in the center-northwest of the province, limiting with the departments of Nueve de Julio and Vera in the north, San Justo in the east, and Las Colonias and Castellanos in the south; to the west it shares a short border with the province of Córdoba and a longer one with Santiago del Estero.

The department is the third largest in the province and has about 65,000 inhabitants. The head town is San Cristóbal (population 14,000). The municipalities and communes in the department total 32: Aguará Grande, Ambrosetti, Arrufó, Capivara, Ceres, Colonia Ana, Colonia Bossi, Colonia Dos Rosas y La Legua, Colonia Rosa, Constanza, Curupaity, Hersilia, Huanqueros, La Cabral, Colonia Clara, La Lucila, La Rubia, Las Avispas, Las Palmeras, Moisés Ville, Monigotes, Monte Oscuridad, Ñanducita, Palacios, Portugalete, San Cristóbal, San Guillermo, Santurce, Soledad, Suardi, Villa Saralegui, Villa Trinidad.
