= Helvecia =

Town in Santa Fe Province, Argentina

Coordinates: 31°6′S 60°5′W

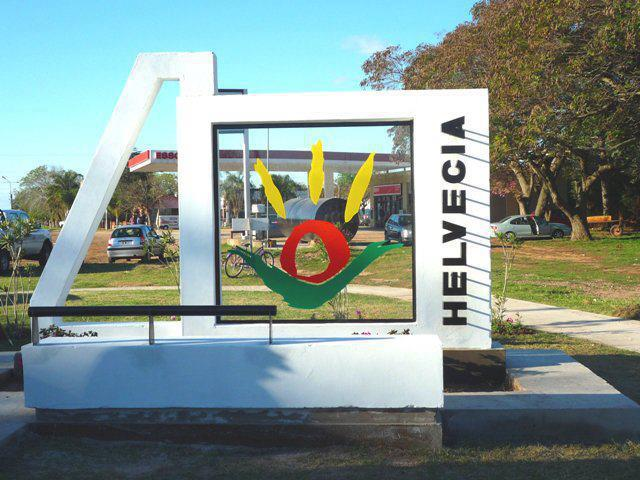
Sign at the entrance of the town of Helvecia

Helvecia is a town (comuna) in the center-east of the province of Santa Fe, Argentina, on the San Javier River (which empties directly into the Paraná River). It had about 8,500 inhabitants at the 2001 census [INDEC] and it is the head town of the Garay Department.

Helvecia lies 94 km (58 mi) north-northeast of the provincial capital, to which it is linked by Provincial Route 1 and National Route 11. It is also located only 15 km from the ruins of the old provincial capital, Cayastá.

The town was founded in 1865 by Dr. Teófilo Romang, who had signed a contract with the provincial government, receiving 50 km^{2} of land for free on the condition of founding an agricultural colony with 125 immigrant families. Romang first came accompanied by 12 Swiss people in order to inspect the site, on 1 January 1865. Helvecia attained the status of comuna (commune) on 14 July 1886.

Helvecia is a prime spot for fishing of the amarillo (Banded Pimelodid, Pimelodus clarias clarias), and hosts the National and Provincial Amarillo Fishing Festival in July, which includes fishing contests and folkloric celebrations.
