= Cayastá =

- Town
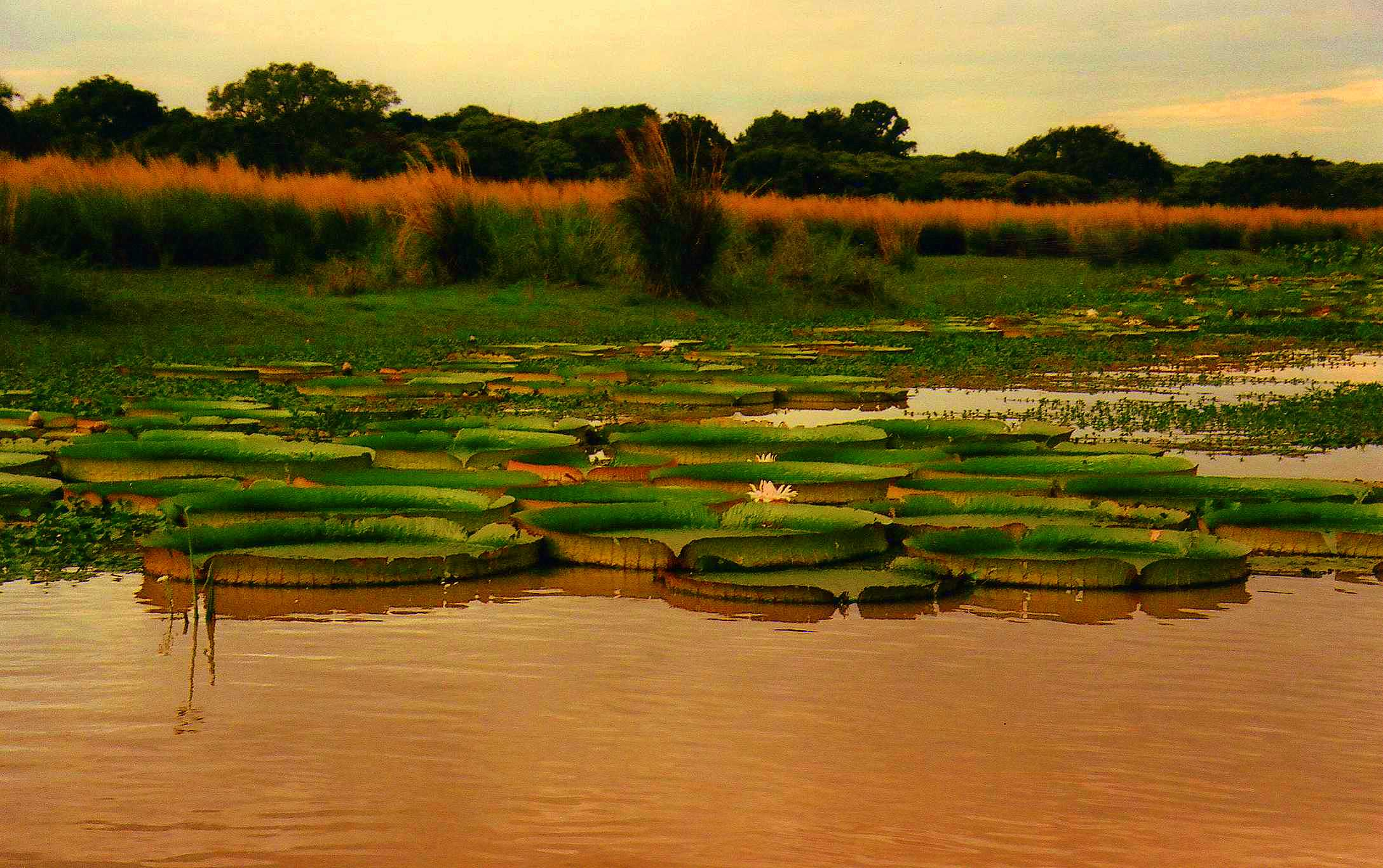

- Location of Cayastá in Argentina
- Coordinates: 31°25′S 60°20′W
- Country: Argentina
- Province: Santa Fe
- Department: Garay

Population (2010)
  - Total: 3,367
- Time zone: UTC−3 (ART)
- CPA base: S3001
- Dialing code: +54 342

Cayastá is a town (comuna) in the province of Santa Fe, Argentina. It has 3,367 inhabitants per the 2010 census [INDEC].

The ruins of the primitive City of Santa Fe de la Vera Cruz, from its foundation until its relocation due to the defences of the native towns and the cyclical floods, are located very close to it (approximately 1.5 kilometres southwards from its centre). Cayastá was a mocoví reduction in 1742.

== Toponymy ==
The word "Cayastá" appears for the first time in an ancient document dating from 1607. For the engineer Augusto Fernández Díaz, the etymology of the toponym "Cayastá" derives from the phonetic transformation of "Kollastas" agglutination of "Kolla" and "Astay" that "denotes" moving, from where Cayastá would be "pueblo colla que se muda". Kolla was one of the villages of Aimaraes, with its own dialect, dominated by the Incas.
