= Reconquista, Santa Fe =

City in Argentina

Reconquista
- City
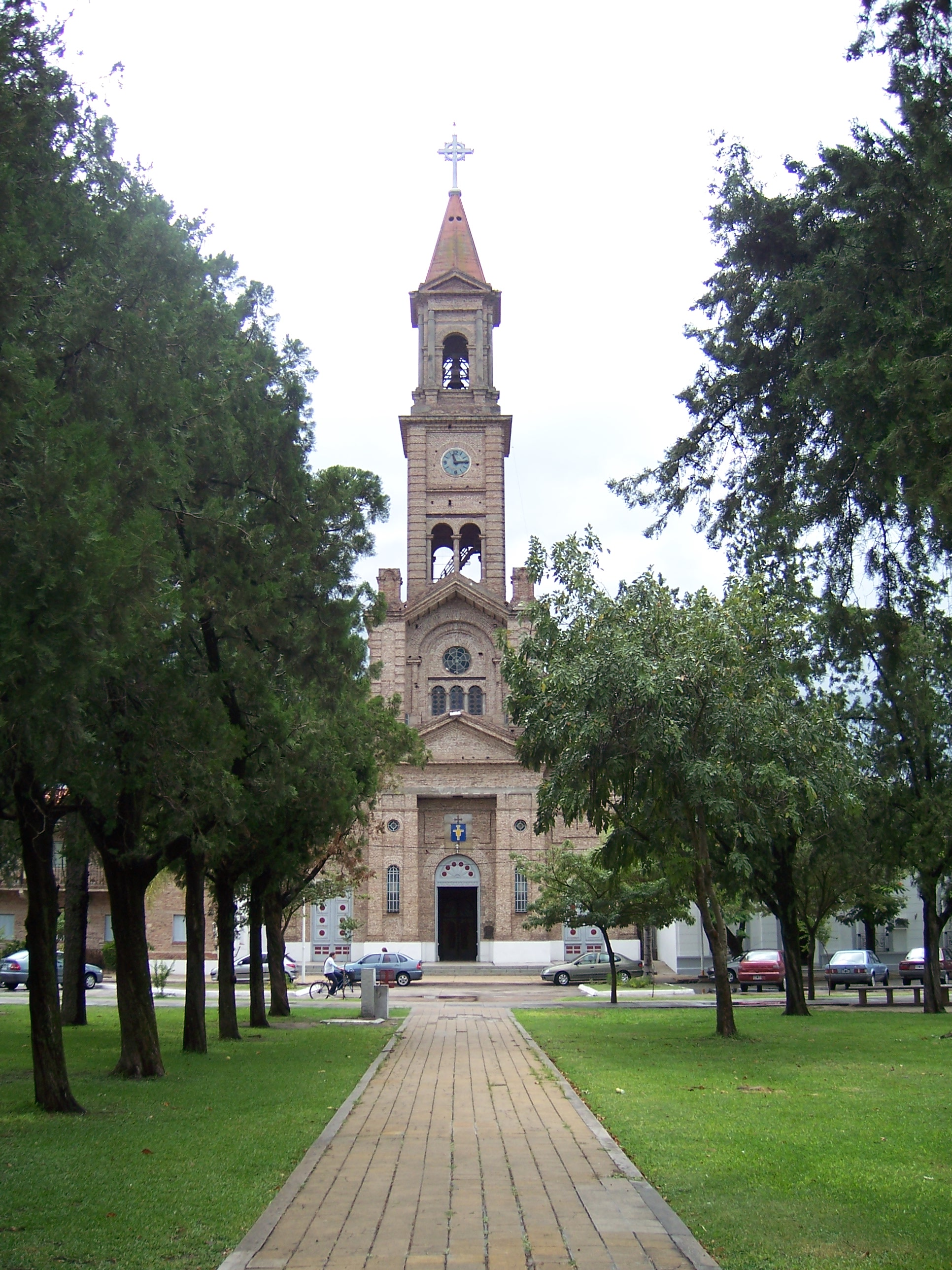
- Reconquista Cathedral

- Flag

- Location of Reconquista in Argentina
- Coordinates: 29°14′S 59°56′W
- Country: Argentina
- Province: Santa Fe
- Department: General Obligado
- Founded: 1872

Government
  - Intendant: Amadeo E. Vallejos (PJ)

Area
  - Total: 537 km^{2} (207 sq mi)
- Elevation: 46 m (151 ft)

Population (2022 census)
  - Total: 84,939
  - Density: 158/km^{2} (410/sq mi)
- Time zone: UTC−3 (ART)
- CPA base: S3560
- Dialing code: +54 3482
- Website: Official website

Reconquista is a city in the north of the province of Santa Fe, Argentina, 327 km (203 mi) from the provincial capital. It is the head town of the General Obligado Department, and it has 84,939 inhabitants according to the 2022 census [INDEC].

The city lies on a branch of the Paraná River opposite the city of Goya, Corrientes. As of 2005, the construction of a road link between the two cities is under study; at present there is no way to cross the multiple minor branches, streams and wetlands except by boat.

Reconquista was founded on 27 April 1872 as a military fort, established by Colonel Manuel Obligado, in lands formerly belonging to the Jesuit mission Reducción San Jerónimo del Rey. It was declared a city in 1921.

== Climate ==
The climate of the region is wet subtropical (average 14 °C (57 °F) in winter, 26 °C (79 °F) in summer), with a mean annual rainfall of 1,290 mm (51 in).

Climate data for Reconquista, Santa Fe (1991–2020, extremes 1961–present)
Month	Jan	Feb	Mar	Apr	May	Jun	Jul	Aug	Sep	Oct	Nov	Dec	Year
Record high °C (°F)	43.9 (111.0)	43.7 (110.7)	40.5 (104.9)	37.0 (98.6)	34.8 (94.6)	32.3 (90.1)	34.2 (93.6)	38.4 (101.1)	42.5 (108.5)	41.2 (106.2)	45.2 (113.4)	42.7 (108.9)	45.2 (113.4)
Mean daily maximum °C (°F)	32.4 (90.3)	31.2 (88.2)	29.4 (84.9)	26.0 (78.8)	22.2 (72.0)	19.9 (67.8)	19.7 (67.5)	22.7 (72.9)	24.4 (75.9)	26.8 (80.2)	29.0 (84.2)	31.1 (88.0)	26.2 (79.2)
Daily mean °C (°F)	26.4 (79.5)	25.3 (77.5)	23.6 (74.5)	20.4 (68.7)	16.9 (62.4)	14.4 (57.9)	13.5 (56.3)	15.6 (60.1)	17.7 (63.9)	20.8 (69.4)	23.0 (73.4)	25.2 (77.4)	20.2 (68.4)
Mean daily minimum °C (°F)	21.0 (69.8)	20.4 (68.7)	18.8 (65.8)	15.8 (60.4)	12.6 (54.7)	10.1 (50.2)	8.7 (47.7)	10.0 (50.0)	12.1 (53.8)	15.4 (59.7)	17.4 (63.3)	19.7 (67.5)	15.2 (59.4)
Record low °C (°F)	9.3 (48.7)	9.0 (48.2)	6.2 (43.2)	2.8 (37.0)	−2.6 (27.3)	−3.5 (25.7)	−6.0 (21.2)	−4.3 (24.3)	−0.6 (30.9)	3.3 (37.9)	5.8 (42.4)	6.4 (43.5)	−6.0 (21.2)
Average precipitation mm (inches)	150.9 (5.94)	150.9 (5.94)	138.4 (5.45)	141.5 (5.57)	75.0 (2.95)	34.8 (1.37)	24.1 (0.95)	36.2 (1.43)	45.5 (1.79)	108.9 (4.29)	156.8 (6.17)	162.8 (6.41)	1,225.8 (48.26)
Average precipitation days (≥ 0.1 mm)	8.1	8.3	8.0	8.6	6.4	4.9	4.1	3.8	6.0	9.6	8.9	9.0	85.5
Average relative humidity (%)	70.1	74.1	76.5	79.3	80.8	81.3	76.4	70.3	69.1	71.6	69.0	69.9	74.0
Mean monthly sunshine hours	263.5	237.3	226.3	189.0	173.6	144.0	179.8	201.5	192.0	223.2	258.0	251.1	2,539.3
Mean daily sunshine hours	8.5	8.4	7.3	6.3	5.6	4.8	5.8	6.5	6.4	7.2	8.6	8.1	7.0
Percentage possible sunshine	65	65	60	59	58	51	53	58	57	62	63	63	60
Source 1: Servicio Meteorológico Nacional
Source 2: NOAA (percent sun 1961–1990)

== Transportation ==
The city is served by commercial airlines using the Reconquista Airport, served, as of 2023, by LADE.

== History ==
Reconquista was natively inhabited by the Abipones people according to accounts from Jesuit Martin Dobrizhoffer.

On November 22, 1872, the Governor Simón de Iriondo by Decree No. 430 authorizing the creation of a town a with the name of Reconquista.

In 1998, there were a high number of leptospirosis cases were detected, coming from the area of Reconquista Central Hospital in Reconquista, Santa Fe province.

== Notable residents ==
- Gabriel Batistuta: retired professional footballer
- Laura Devetach, writer, was born here in 1936.
- Juan Gómez Taleb: professional footballer
- Candela Ferro - television journalist
