= San Javier, Santa Fe =

San Javier
- City
- Location of San Javier in Argentina
- Coordinates: 30°35′S 59°57′W
- Country: Argentina
- Province: Santa Fe
- Department: San Javier

Government
  - Intendant: Maribel González (UCR)

Area
  - Total: 2,284 km^{2} (882 sq mi)

Population (2010 census)
  - Total: 13,604
  - Density: 5.956/km^{2} (15.43/sq mi)
- Time zone: UTC−3 (ART)
- CPA base: S3005
- Dialing code: +54 3405

San Javier is a city in the northeast of the province of Santa Fe, Argentina, 156 km north-northeast from the provincial capital. It had about 13,000 inhabitants at the 2010 census [INDEC] and it is the head town of the San Javier Department.

The town was founded in 1743 by Francisco de Echagüe y Andía, but only recognized as such by the provincial government in 1866. It attained the status of comuna (commune) on 1884-05-25, and became a city on 1979-12-02.
