= Nanque =

Argentine sports equipment company

Nanque S.A.
- Type: S.A.
- Industry: Textile
- Founded: 1969; 57 years ago
- Headquarters: Banfield, Argentina
- Key people: Miguel Portell (President)
- Products: Sportswear
- Owner: Portell family
- Website: nanque.com.ar

Nanque S.A. is an Argentine sports equipment manufacturer, headquartered in Banfield, Buenos Aires. Founded in 1969, its goal was to manufacture clothing and sportswear for professional and amateur sports, focusing on the association football market, where the company sponsored several teams not only in Argentina but in South and Central America. One of the Nanque's owners, Carlos Portell, was also president of Club Atlético Banfield from 1998 to 2012.

== Overview ==
Nanque was established in 1969 to produce sportswear for the most popular sports in Argentina, in a time the most international manufacturers were not doing business in the country so Nanque signed deals with some professional football teams, sharing sponsorships with other local brands such as Uribarri, Sportlandia and Olimpia.

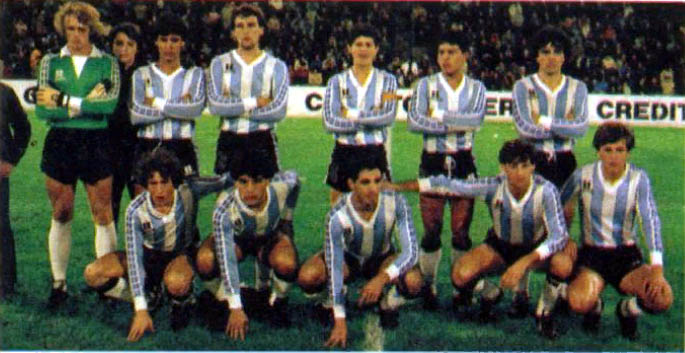
Racing Club young team wearing Nanque kits in 1983

Nanque took a step as a manufacturer in the 1980s, where the company provide football uniforms for many teams of lower divisions (most of them in Primera B Metropolitana).

Apart from football, Nanque also sponsored some notable boxers of Argentina, including world champions Juan Martín Coggi and Jorge Locomotora Castro.

In the 1990s, the company reached its peak when sponsoring some teams in Argentine Primera División, even starting operations outside Argentina to sponsor clubs in Uruguay, Colombia, Ecuador and El Salvador.

The brand was relaunched in the 2020s through an online shopping where former Nanque football products are offered.

== Sponsorships ==
=== Football ===
Clubs that wore uniforms by Nanque:

=== Clubs ===
- (Argentina) Aldosivi (1991)
- (Argentina) All Boys (1992–94)
- (Argentina) Almirante Brown (1988–96)
- (Argentina) Alumni (VM)
- (Argentina) Alvarado
- (Argentina) Banfield (1982, 1986–95, 2001–08)
- (Argentina) Belgrano (1982, 1995–96)
- (Argentina) Brown (A)
- (Argentina) Central Córdoba (R)
- (Argentina) Central Norte (1998–2007)
- (Argentina) Chaco For Ever (1988–90)
- (Argentina) Cipolletti
- (Argentina) Claypole
- (Argentina) Colón (1982–92)
- (Argentina) CAI (CR) (2009–11)
- (Argentina) Comunicaciones (2006–07)
- (Argentina) Defensa y Justicia (1989–94, 2006–09)
- (Argentina) Defensores Unidos
- (Argentina) Deportivo Español (1982–83)
- (Argentina) El Porvenir
- (Argentina) Gimnasia y Esgrima (CU)
- (Argentina) Godoy Cruz (2003–04)
- (Argentina) Los Andes (1985–88, 2004–06)
- (Argentina) San Lorenzo de Almagro (1989)
- (Argentina) San Telmo
- (Argentina) Sarmiento (J) (1992–95)
- (Argentina) Talleres (RE) (1983–90)
- (Argentina) Temperley (1980–82, 1988–95)
- (Colombia) América de Cali (1995–96)
- (Colombia) Millonarios (1996)
- (Ecuador) Deportivo Quito
- (Guatemala) Municipal
- (El Salvador) FAS
- (Uruguay) Central Español
- (Uruguay) Cerro (1984–91, 1996–99)
- (Uruguay) Danubio (1994–96)
- (Uruguay) Huracán Buceo (1995–96)
- (Uruguay) Nacional (1992–93)
- (Uruguay) Peñarol (1991–96)
- (Uruguay) Rampla Juniors (1994–95)
- (Uruguay) El Tanque Sisley (1986–97, 2004–06)

=== Boxing ===
Boxers sponsored by the firm were:

- (Argentina) Sergio Víctor Palma
- (Argentina) Juan Martín Coggi
- (Argentina) Juan Roldán
- (Argentina) Jorge Castro
- (Argentina) Hugo Luero
- (Argentina) Juan Carlos Sosa
- (Uruguay) José M. Flores
