= Juan Carlos Lectoure =

Argentine boxer

Juan Carlos Lectoure (June 10, 1936 – March 2, 2002), nicknamed "Tito", was an Argentine businessman, mainly involved in boxing events and former owner of Buenos Aires's Luna Park stadium.

He was born and raised in the Balvanera section of Buenos Aires, and at the age of 14, took up boxing at the Buenos Aires Gymnastics and Fencing Club; an injury, however, resulted in his mother's insistence that he abandon the pastime.

The Lectoures had been partners in the Luna Park coliseum since 1941, and he inherited the lucrative business from his uncle, who died in 1950. Mentored by Juan Manuel Morales, Lectoure took control of the venue at age 20, and during the era from 1956 to 2000, well-known figures in Argentine boxing, such as Horacio Accavallo, Ringo Bonavena, Pedro Décima, Víctor Galíndez, Nicolino Locche, Carlos Monzón, Pascual Pérez and Juan Roldán all either debuted or fought title bouts promoted by Lectoure at Luna Park. The venue was also well known for its variety of music recitals, hosting musicians from Argentine tango bandoneonist Aníbal Troilo to the Godfather of Soul, James Brown.

Lectoure later promoted boxing in Miami, Florida.

A chain smoker until 1982, Lectoure developed heart disease and underwent four bypasses in 1990, performed by noted cardiac specialist Dr. René Favaloro. He died in 2002, at age 65.
