= Hugo Corro =

Argentine boxer

Personal information
- Nickname: Itaka
- Born: Hugo Pastor Corro; November 5, 1953 San Carlos, Mendoza, Argentina
- Died: June 15, 2007 (aged 53) Mendoza, Argentina
- Height: 5 ft 8 in (173 cm)
- Weight: Middleweight

Boxing career
- Reach: 67 1/2 in (171 cm)
- Stance: Orthodox

Boxing record
- Total fights: 59
- Wins: 50
- Win by KO: 26
- Losses: 7
- Draws: 2

Hugo Pastor Corro (November 5, 1953 – June 15, 2007), better known plainly as Hugo Corro, was an Argentine professional boxer who held the undisputed middleweight championship between April 1978 and June 1979.

Corro beat Rodrigo Valdez for the world middleweight title, and he would beat Valdez in a rematch. Valdez had succeeded Carlos Monzón as world champion. Since Monzon had beaten Valdez twice also during his period as champion, the comparisons between Corro and Monzon became inevitable. The fact that Corro went to Europe to defend his title was another common trait he shared with Monzon. Corro's championship reign would ultimately prove to be inferior to Monzon's however, as Corro defended his title successfully only twice, and Monzon retained the crown for a then record of fourteen times.

== Professional career ==
Hugo Corro began fighting as a professional on August 30, 1973, with a sixth round knockout victory against Gustavo Dieff in the Argentine city of Tunuyan. His first ten bouts as a professional were held in Tunuyan. He had a draw (tie) against Pedro Pablo Bazan during his second fight, held on September 15, 16 days after his debut.

Corro reeled off three consecutive knockout wins, then faced Bazan in a rematch, on December 7. On his last fight of 1973, Corro was declared winner when Bazan was disqualified in the fourth round.

Corro won one more fight, and then, he fought ten rounds for the first time in his career, when he defeated Ramon Roberts by a ten-round decision on February 6, 1974. After another victory, he fought Juan Carlos Artaza on July 17. From a status standpoint, the fight had little significance, since Artaza only had two previous bouts, and he had lost both of them. But this was Corro's first fight outside Tunuyan. He beat Artaza by a ten-round decision in San Juan.

After one more win, he faced Hugo Saavedra, then a well established middleweight contender, on November 11. Saavedra gave Corro his first defeat, when he knocked out the future champion in the eighth round.

Corro rebounded with a sixth-round knockout win over Hugo Obregon on March 7, 1975. That marked the beginning of a thirteen fight winning streak, which included a rematch with Roberts, knocked out in six on July 4, two more fights with Obregon, both of which ended with Corro winning ten-round decisions, a victory by decision in ten against Norberto Cabrera, and two more fights against Saavedra.

His first rematch with Saavedra, on September 27, marked Corro's Buenos Aires debut. Corro was able to avenge his first defeat when he outpointed Saavedra over ten rounds. Their third bout, held on March 5, 1976 at Córdoba, ended when Saavedra was disqualified in the tenth round.

After a win against Roque Roldan, Corro met Norberto Cabrera for a second time. On May 21, he lost to Cabrera by a ten-round decision, in Buenos Aires. Corro, however, once again bounced back well, winning his next seven fights by knockout, including a rematch with Juan Carlos Artaza, who was beaten in round ten on September 10.

On December 10, he got his first shot at a title, when he fought Julio Medina for the vacant Argentine middleweight title. Corro won the national championship by knocking Medina out in round three of a fight that was scheduled for twelve rounds.

After two victories over Rodolfo Rosales, Corro had his first fight abroad, boxing against Marcelo Quinones on May 9, 1977, for the South American middleweight title, in Lima, Peru. He conquered the continental championship by decisioning Quinones over twelve rounds. The win also earned him a spot among the world's top ten middleweight challengers for the first time.

Corro followed that win with seven more victories, including title defenses of both his Argentine and his South American middleweight titles, before he got his first opportunity at becoming world champion: on April 22, 1978, Corro became the undisputed world middleweight champion by beating Valdez by a fifteen-round decision in Italy.

His first world title defense came against Ronnie Harris, on August 5, back in Argentina. He outpointed Harris over fifteen rounds, and then, on November 11, he retained the title in his rematch with Valdez, by a fifteen-round decision at Buenos Aires.

He traveled to Monte Carlo, where Monzon defended his title a few times, to face Vito Antuofermo for his third world title defense. Corro lost the title on June 30 of 1979 in a fight that was actually held at Monaco's royal palace. Corro in reality lost his title by only one point, as Antuofermo beat him by a split decision, and each judge had a one-point difference on their scorecard (scores of 146-145, 145-146 and 142-143). Asked about the fight during the press conference that followed it, Corro answered "I only had one problem, his head". By saying this, he meant that he felt Antuofermo butted him many times during the contest.

After winning one more fight and losing another one, Corro decided to retire for the first time in 1981. Inspired by the relative success of his much younger brother Osvaldo, a contender during the late 1980s, however, Hugo attempted a comeback during 1988. He made some headlines after winning his first two bouts, but he lost three of his next four bouts, with one draw. On September 16 of '88 he lost to another famous Argentine boxer, Juan Roldán, by knockout in round one. After losing by knockout in four rounds to Hugo Antonio Corti on February 17 of 1989, Corro retired from boxing for good.

Corro had one fight in Chile. He never boxed in the United States as a professional.

Corro had a record of 50 wins, 7 losses and 2 draws as a professional boxer, with 29 wins by way of knockout. On June 15, 2007, he died after suffering from an acute liver disease.

== Professional boxing record ==
59 fights	50 wins	7 losses
By knockout	26	3
By decision	22	4
By disqualification	2	0
Draws	2	

No.	Result	Record	Opponent	Type	Round	Date	Location	Notes
59	Loss	50–7–2	Antonio Corti	KO	4 (10)	Feb 17, 1989	Mar del Plata, Buenos Aires, Argentina	
58	Draw	50–6–2	Jorge García	PTS	10	Dec 9, 1988	Neuquén, Neuquén, Argentina	
57	Loss	50–6–1	Juan Roldán	KO	1 (10)	Sep 16, 1988	Mar del Plata, Buenos Aires, Argentina	
56	Loss	50–5–1	Miguel Angel Maldonado	PTS	10	Jul 8, 1988	Tandil, Buenos Aires, Argentina	
55	Win	50–4–1	Manuel Perez	PTS	10	Jun 9, 1988	Tunuyán, Mendoza, Argentina	
54	Win	49–4–1	Juan Carlos Ledesma	KO	4 (10)	Feb 4, 1988	Tunuyán, Mendoza, Argentina	
53	Loss	48–4–1	Antonio Garrido	MD	10	Dec 4, 1981	Santiago, Santiago, Chile	
52	Win	48–3–1	Juan Alberto Mora	KO	5 (10)	Jul 17, 1981	Mar del Plata, Buenos Aires, Argentina	
51	Loss	47–3–1	Vito Antuofermo	SD	15	Jun 30, 1979	Esplanade de Fontvieille, Monte Carlo, Monaco	Lost WBA, WBC, and The Ring middleweight titles
50	Win	47–2–1	Rodrigo Valdez	UD	15	Nov 11, 1978	Estadio Luna Park, Buenos Aires, Argentina	Retained WBA, WBC, and The Ring middleweight titles
49	Win	46–2–1	Willie Warren	PTS	10	Oct 6, 1978	Mendoza, Mendoza, Argentina	
48	Win	45–2–1	Ronnie Harris	UD	15	Aug 5, 1978	Estadio Luna Park, Buenos Aires, Argentina	Retained WBA, WBC, and The Ring middleweight titles
47	Win	44–2–1	Rodrigo Valdez	UD	15	Apr 22, 1978	Teatro Ariston, Sanremo, Liguria, Italy	Won WBA, WBC, and The Ring middleweight titles
46	Win	43–2–1	Juan Carlos Bogado	PTS	10	Mar 3, 1978	Estadio Luna Park, Buenos Aires, Argentina	
45	Win	42–2–1	Antonio Garrido	PTS	12	Dec 20, 1977	Mendoza, Mendoza, Argentina	Retained South American middleweight title
44	Win	41–2–1	Mario Romersi	PTS	8	Nov 19, 1977	PalaRuffini, Turin, Piedmont, Italy	
43	Win	40–2–1	Bob Patterson	KO	5 (10)	Nov 5, 1977	Estadio Luna Park, Buenos Aires, Argentina	
42	Win	39–2–1	Roque Roldan	PTS	10	Oct 17, 1977	Villa Carlos Paz, Córdoba, Argentina	
41	Win	38–2–1	Norberto Fleitas	KO	2 (12)	Sep 2, 1977	Mendoza, Mendoza, Argentina	Retained South American middleweight title
40	Win	37–2–1	Pedro Duarte	PTS	12	Jul 2, 1977	Estadio Luna Park, Buenos Aires, Argentina	Retained Argentina middleweight title
39	Win	36–2–1	Marcelo Quiñones	SD	12	May 9, 1977	Estadio Nacional, Lima, Lima, Peru	Won South American middleweight title
38	Win	35–2–1	Rodolfo Rosales	PTS	10	Apr 6, 1977	San Luis, San Luis, Argentina	
37	Win	34–2–1	Rodolfo Rosales	PTS	10	Feb 23, 1977	Mendoza, Mendoza, Argentina	
36	Win	33–2–1	Julio Medina	TKO	3 (12)	Dec 10, 1976	Mendoza, Mendoza, Argentina	Won vacant Argentina middleweight title
35	Win	32–2–1	Pedro Acuña	TKO	1 (6)	Nov 26, 1976	Tunuyán, Mendoza, Argentina	
34	Win	31–2–1	Raul Paez	TKO	2 (10)	Nov 5, 1976	Mendoza, Mendoza, Argentina	
33	Win	30–2–1	Francisco Rodriguez Martin	TKO	2 (8)	Oct 8, 1976	Palacio de Deportes, Madrid, Community of Madrid, Spain	
32	Win	29–2–1	Juan Carlos Artaza	KO	10 (10)	Sep 10, 1976	Mendoza, Mendoza, Argentina	
31	Win	28–2–1	Juan Carlos Bogado	TKO	10 (10)	Aug 6, 1976	Tunuyán, Mendoza, Argentina	
30	Win	27–2–1	Roberto Marziali	TKO	9 (10)	Jul 8, 1976	Córdoba, Córdoba, Argentina	
29	Win	26–2–1	Gregorio Navarro	TKO	4 (10)	Jun 11, 1976	Tunuyán, Mendoza, Argentina	
28	Loss	25–2–1	Norberto Cabrera	PTS	10	May 21, 1976	Estadio Luna Park, Buenos Aires, Argentina	
27	Win	25–1–1	Roque Roldan	PTS	10	Mar 27, 1976	Estadio Luna Park, Buenos Aires, Argentina	
26	Win	24–1–1	Hugo Saavedra	DQ	10 (10)	Mar 5, 1976	Córdoba, Córdoba, Argentina	
25	Win	23–1–1	Hugo Obregon	PTS	10	Feb 6, 1976	Salta, Salta, Argentina	
24	Win	22–1–1	Hugo Obregon	PTS	10	Dec 19, 1975	Córdoba, Córdoba, Argentina	
23	Win	21–1–1	Norberto Cabrera	PTS	10	Nov 7, 1975	Tunuyán, Mendoza, Argentina	
22	Win	20–1–1	Hugo Saavedra	PTS	10	Sep 27, 1975	Estadio Luna Park, Buenos Aires, Argentina	
21	Win	19–1–1	Camilo Gaitan	RTD	4 (10)	Aug 22, 1975	Mendoza, Mendoza, Argentina	
20	Win	18–1–1	Octavio Escauriza	KO	3 (10)	Jul 25, 1975	Estadio Luna Park, Buenos Aires, Argentina	
19	Win	17–1–1	Ramon Robert	RTD	6 (10)	Jul 4, 1975	Villa Mercedes, San Luis, Argentina	
18	Win	16–1–1	Norberto Fleitas	TKO	4 (10)	Jun 13, 1975	Mendoza, Mendoza, Argentina	
17	Win	15–1–1	Orlando Nasul	PTS	10	May 29, 1975	Salta, Salta, Argentina	
16	Win	14–1–1	Eliseo Nieva	TKO	8 (10)	Mar 26, 1975	Mendoza, Mendoza, Argentina	
15	Win	13–1–1	Hugo Obregón	TKO	6 (10)	Mar 7, 1975	Salta, Salta, Argentina	
14	Loss	12–1–1	Hugo Saavedra	KO	8 (10)	Nov 8, 1974	Tunuyán, Mendoza, Argentina	
13	Win	12–0–1	Ruben Martinez	TKO	5 (10)	Oct 4, 1974	San Juan, San Juan, Argentina	
12	Win	11–0–1	Carlos Robledo	TKO	7 (10)	Sep 8, 1974	Tunuyán, Mendoza, Argentina	
11	Win	10–0–1	Juan Carlos Artaza	PTS	10	Jul 19, 1974	San Juan, San Juan, Argentina	
10	Win	9–0–1	Orlando Nasul	PTS	10	Jun 20, 1974	Tunuyán, Mendoza, Argentina	
9	Win	8–0–1	Ruben Martinez	TKO	5 (10)	Apr 14, 1974	Tunuyán, Mendoza, Argentina	
8	Win	7–0–1	Ramon Robert	PTS	10	Feb 8, 1974	Tunuyán, Mendoza, Argentina	
7	Win	6–0–1	Rafael Lazcano	KO	3 (6)	Dec 21, 1973	Tunuyán, Mendoza, Argentina	
6	Win	5–0–1	Pedro Bazan	DQ	4 (8)	Dec 7, 1973	Tunuyán, Mendoza, Argentina	
5	Win	4–0–1	Oscar Mercado	KO	7 (8)	Nov 23, 1973	Tunuyán, Mendoza, Argentina	
4	Win	3–0–1	Raul Fleita	KO	2 (6)	Oct 26, 1973	Tunuyán, Mendoza, Argentina	
3	Win	2–0–1	Juan Carlos Cantero	RTD	4 (6)	Oct 5, 1973	Tunuyán, Mendoza, Argentina	
2	Draw	1–0–1	Pedro Bazan	PTS	6	Sep 15, 1973	Tunuyán, Mendoza, Argentina	
1	Win	1–0	Gastón Diet	TKO	6 (6)	Aug 30, 1973	Polideportivo Municipal, Tunuyán, Mendoza, Argentina	

== Titles in boxing ==
=== Major world titles ===
- WBA middleweight champion (160 lbs)
- WBC middleweight champion (160 lbs)

=== The Ring magazine titles ===
- The Ring middleweight champion (160 lbs)

=== Regional/International titles ===
- Argentina middleweight champion (160 lbs)
- South American middleweight champion (160 lbs)

=== Undisputed titles ===
- Undisputed middleweight champion

== See also ==
- List of world middleweight boxing champions

Sporting positions
Regional boxing titles
Preceded by Marcelo Quiñones	South American middleweight champion May 9, 1977 – 1978; Vacated	Vacant Title next held by José María Flores Burlón
World boxing titles
Preceded by Rodrigo Valdez	WBA middleweight champion April 22, 1978 – June 30, 1979	Succeeded by Vito Antuofermo
Preceded by Rodrigo Valdez	WBC middleweight champion April 22, 1978 – June 30, 1979	Succeeded by Vito Antuofermo
Preceded by Rodrigo Valdez	The Ring middleweight champion April 22, 1978 – June 30, 1979	Succeeded by Vito Antuofermo
Preceded by Rodrigo Valdez	Undisputed middleweight champion April 22, 1978 – June 30, 1979	Succeeded by Vito Antuofermo
Middleweight status
Preceded by Carlos Monzón	Latest born world champion to die June 15, 2007 – March 13, 2021	Succeeded by Marvelous Marvin Hagler
