= Carlos Monzón =

Argentine boxer (1942–1995)

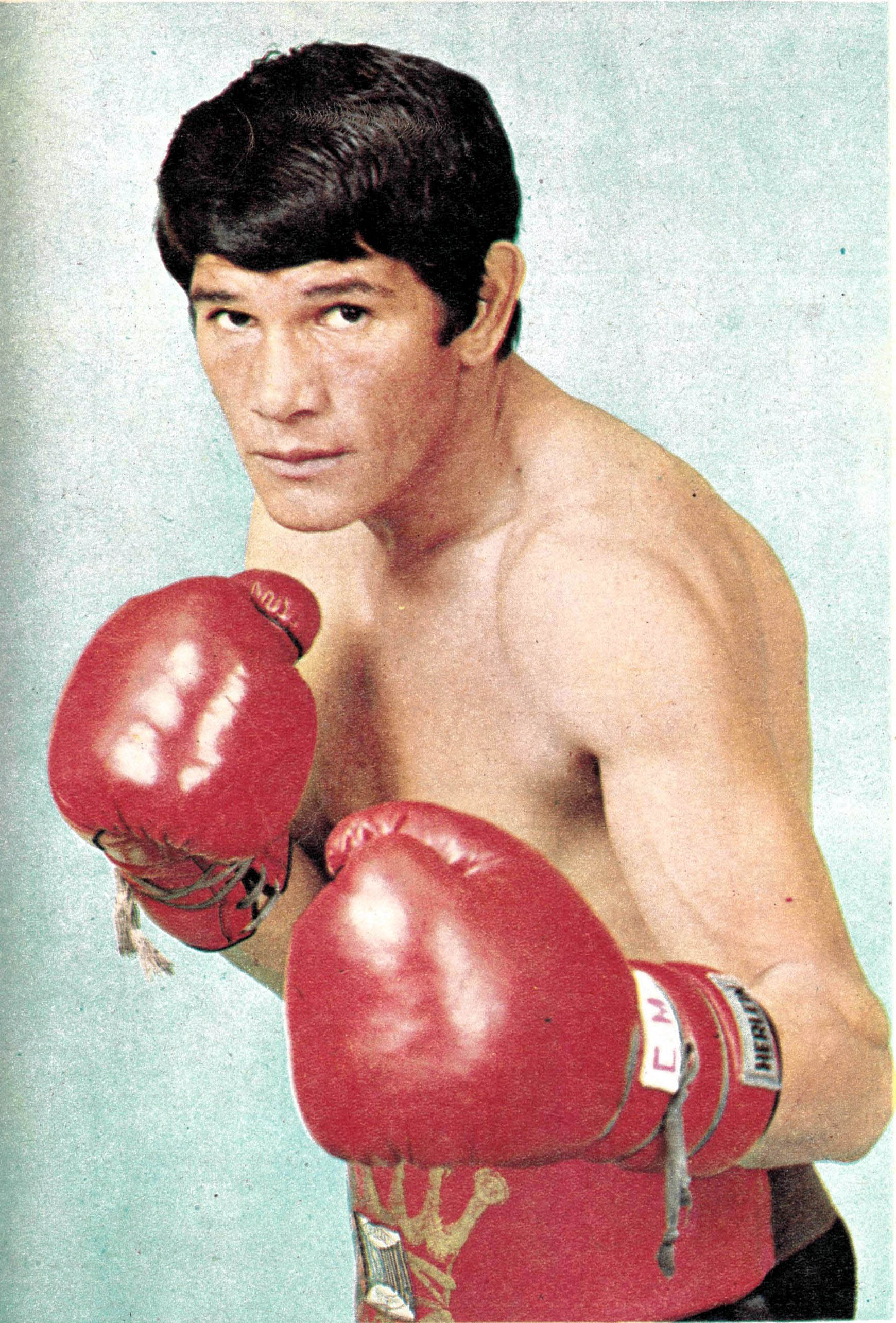
- Monzón in 1972

Personal information
- Nickname: Escopeta
- Born: Carlos Roque Monzón; 7 August 1942 San Javier, Argentina
- Died: 8 January 1995 (aged 52) Santa Rosa de Calchines, Argentina
- Height: 5 ft 11 1/2 in (182 cm)
- Weight: Middleweight

Boxing career
- Reach: 76 in (193 cm)
- Stance: Orthodox

Boxing record
- Total fights: 100
- Wins: 87
- Win by KO: 59
- Losses: 3
- Draws: 9
- No contests: 1

Carlos Roque Monzón (7 August 1942 – 8 January 1995), nicknamed Escopeta (Shotgun), was an Argentine professional boxer who held the undisputed world middleweight championship for seven years, and successfully defended his title 14 times against 11 different fighters. The Ring magazine and Boxing Writers Association of America named him Fighter of the Year in 1972. As of May 2026, Monzón is ranked by BoxRec as the seventh greatest boxer of all time, pound for pound. He was inducted into the International Boxing Hall of Fame in 1990.

Known for his speed, punching power and relentless work rate, Monzón ended his career with a record of 87-3-9-1 with 59 knockouts; all of his losses were early in his career and were avenged. In 2002, Monzón was chosen by The Ring magazine as the 11th greatest fighter of the last 80 years, and voted him as the best middleweight title holder of the last 50 years in 2011. As of January 2018, Monzón holds the 2nd longest unified championship reign in middleweight history at 9 consecutive defenses.

Argentinians adored Monzón throughout his career. His glamorous and violent life was avidly followed both by the media and Argentine people. He was, however, accused many times of domestic violence by his two wives and many mistresses and of beating paparazzi. Charged with killing his second wife Alicia Muñiz in 1988, the former champion was sentenced to 11 years in jail. He died in a January 1995 car crash while on his way back to jail after receiving a weekend furlough.

== Early life ==
Monzón was born in the city of San Javier, Argentina, to a family of Mocoví descent. His parents were Roque Monzón and Amalia Ledesma. Monzón was raised in poverty with his twelve siblings. When Monzón was six years old, his family moved to Barranquitas Oeste, a poor neighborhood of Santa Fe, the capital of Santa Fe Province. To help out his family, he quit school in the third grade and worked different jobs, such as shoeshine, paperboy and milkman. He augmented his income by winning street fights, and he was drawn towards amateur boxing to help refine his skills. He was trained and mentored by ex-wrestler Amilcar Brusa.

When he was sixteen, he met Zulema Encarnación Torres, with whom he had his first son. Later, on 11 May 1962, he married Mercedes Beatriz García, nicknamed 'Pelusa'. They were so poor that they did not have enough money to buy the marriage license. They had three kids, one of whom was adopted.

== Boxing beginnings ==
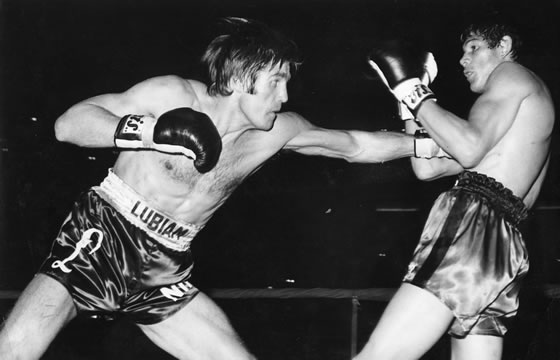
Monzón (right) fighting Nino Benvenuti in 1970

Monzón had his first amateur fight on 2 October 1959. This first fight ended in a draw. Three years later, after a 73-6-8 amateur record, he became a professional. His first professional bout was held on 6 February 1963. He knocked out his opponent in the second round. Reflecting on his early professional career, Monzón recalled how "Initially, I couldn't even afford boxing boots and got infections in my feet." In 1966, he won the Argentine middleweight title. In 1967, he won the South American middleweight title. After this success, Argentine boxing promoter Juan Carlos Lectoure pushed him into the international boxing scene by organizing fights with foreign boxers such as Douglas Huntley, Charles Austin, Johnny Brooks, Harold Richardson, Tommy Bethea, Bennie Briscoe (a ten-round tie) Manoel Severino and Eddy Pace.

World middleweight champion Nino Benvenuti had long had a distinguished career that included championships in 2 divisions and 2 wins vs all-time great Emile Griffith. He had lost the year before to American Tom Bethea in Australia, but in an actual title fight in Yugoslavia, he avenged that loss.

Nobody expected Monzón to beat Benvenuti in their title match (very few knew of him). Yet Monzón applied pressure from the start, and in the 12th, a right hand landed perfectly on Benvenuti's chin, and the title changed hands. Monzón also beat Benvenuti in a rematch, this time in only three rounds in Monte Carlo when Benvenuti's seconds threw in the towel.

== Champion ==
In 1971, Monzón became only the second man to stop former three-time world champion Emile Griffith in 14 rounds, and later out-pointed him over 15 in a close fight (before the fight Monzón had to spar three rounds and run three miles in order to make the weight). Monzón then scored a win over tough Philadelphian Bennie Briscoe in their rematch, over-coming a shakey 9th round, in which Briscoe almost scored a knockout; a knockout in five rounds over European champion Tom Bogs, a knockout in seven rounds over Cuban-Mexican José Mantequilla Nápoles in Paris, and a 10-round knockout of tough Tony Licata of New Orleans at the Madison Square Garden, in what would turn out to be Monzón's only fight in the United States.

Monzón's middleweight championship title was lifted in 1975 by the WBC for not defending it against mandatory challenger Rodrigo Valdez. Valdez, a Colombian, won the WBC's title, while Monzón kept the WBA's championship. In 1976, they finally met, this time, world champion vs. world champion.

Valdez's brother had been shot to death one week prior to the fight and he did not feel like fighting. Still, the fight went on, as they were both under contract. It took place in Monte Carlo. Monzón handed Valdez a beating, winning a 15-round unanimous decision and unifying the world title once again. Facing a lack of good challengers, Monzón was offered a high purse to again fight the Colombian.

The second fight was different. Monzón-Valdez II is a classic. Valdez came out roaring this time. In the second round, right cross to the chin put Monzón down for the first and only time in his career. Valdez built a lead through the first part of the fight. Monzón, however, mounted a brilliant comeback and outboxed Valdez for the last 8 rounds, winning a unanimous decision to retain the title and score his 14th title defense.

== Retirement ==
Monzón retired after the second Valdez fight defense. His record stood at 87 wins, only three losses, nine draws and one no contest. Of his wins, 59 came by knockout. All three of his losses were on points, early in his career, and were all avenged. In 2003, he was named by the Ring Magazine as one of the 100 greatest punchers of all time.

Always known for his overhand right, following Monzón's victory over Mantequilla Nápoles, Angelo Dundee said: "Monzón is the complete fighter. He can box, he can hit, he can think, and he is game all the way."

Before retirement, in 1974, he starred in La Mary, a hit movie directed by Daniel Tinayre. After retirement, he participated as an actor in a couple of Argentine movies, which were not very successful, and TV shows.

A monument to him stands in Santa Fe, Argentina.

== Boxing style ==
Monzón's style made effective use of his six-foot height and 76-inch reach. Boxing historian Mike Casey describes Monzón as being as "downright ordinary when viewed through a strictly technical eye," but that he possessed a "deceptive destructiveness" that allowed him to win out over technically superior foes. Monzón would use a stiff, punishing left jab to set up a variety of fast right hands that hit at unorthodox angles. Unusual for a fighter of his height, Monzón liked to throw punches from a squatting position, seen in his first fight against Nino Benvenuti. Monzón was an effective finisher, finishing 10 of his 15 title fights with an overall KO percentage of 67.82%. Opponents often rushed forward as a way of countering Monzón's height and reach, but Monzón was skilled at inflicting punishment when moving backwards.

== Personal life ==
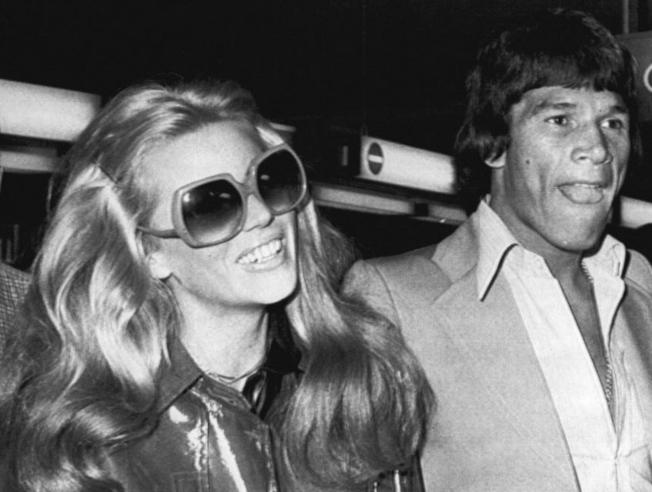
Monzón and actress Susana Giménez in 1976. Their turbulent relationship attracted media attention for years

While still a champion, a darker side of Monzón began to emerge. In 1973, Monzón was shot in the leg by his then wife of 11 years, Mercedes Beatriz García, with whom he had a daughter and two sons (one of whom was adopted). The shooting required seven hours of surgery to remove the bullet from Monzón's leg. In 1975, he began a very publicized romance with Susana Giménez; they had previously met in the 1974 thriller La Mary, directed by Daniel Tinayre, where the two played husband and wife. Monzón hated paparazzi who detailed his affairs. He went to Italy with Giménez to participate in a movie, and started increasingly traveling with her to locations in Brazil and the rest of Latin America, allowing himself be seen with her, although still legally married. He was accused of domestic violence and of beating paparazzi.

Monzón was repeatedly detained by the police. Giménez began wearing sunglasses more often, presumably to hide her bruises, and many times, paparazzi had to be hospitalized from the beatings suffered at the hands of Monzón, who had unpredictable violent outbursts. During this period, Monzón and Mercedes Beatriz Garcia finally divorced.

Susana Giménez left him in 1978. After the breakup, Monzón dated Swiss actress Ursula Andress. In 1979, he met Uruguayan model Alicia Muñiz, with whom he had an on-and-off relationship for many years. They eventually married and had a son together, Maximiliano Roque. But his violent behavior continued. On 14 February 1988, while vacationing in the resort city of Mar del Plata, after a heated argument, he beat Muñiz. According to the investigation after this incident, he strangled her into unconsciousness, picked her up, and pushed her off the second floor balcony, killing her, during which he followed her in the fall, injuring his shoulder. On July 3, 1989, Monzón was found guilty of homicide. He received an 11-year prison sentence.

In January 1995, Monzón was given a weekend furlough while serving his term in Cárcel de Las Flores, Santa Fe Province, to visit his family and children. On 8 January 1995, when on his way to returning to jail after the weekend, he and a passenger, Gerónimo Domingo Mottura, were killed instantly when their vehicle rolled over near Santa Rosa de Calchines. The other passenger, Monzón's sister-in-law Alicia Guadalupe Fessia, was injured.

Even in death, Monzón drew a crowd. Thousands sang "Dale campeón" ("Go Champ") during his funeral.

== Legacy ==
Monzón is often considered to be one of the greatest and most renowned Argentine boxers of all time. His 15 title wins set the record for the most in the middleweight division, and has only since been surpassed by Bernard Hopkins. As of July 2026, BoxRec ranks Monzón as the seventh greatest fighter of all time, pound for pound. His 80-fight unbeaten streak from 1964 until his retirement in 1977 is one of the longest in boxing history. He holds two wins each over middleweight champions Nino Benvenuti, Emile Griffith, and Rodrigo Valdez, as well as a win over light middleweight champion Denny Moyer. He was inducted into the International Boxing Hall of Fame in 1990, who describe him as "clearly one of the best middleweights ever."

While widely regarded as a national hero and highly accomplished boxer, his explosive temper, history of domestic abuse, and conviction for the murder of his wife means that Monzón's legacy remains controversial. Boxing historian John J. Raspanti describes how "remembering him is complicated" and writes that "to the people of Argentina, he's still a hero, worshipped for his ring exploits. To others, he's a monster who could fight."

== Professional boxing record ==
100 fights	87 wins	3 losses
By knockout	59	0
By decision	28	3
Draws	9	
No contests	1	

No.	Result	Record	Opponent	Type	Round, time	Date	Location	Notes
100	Win	87–3–9 (1)	Rodrigo Valdez	UD	15	30 Jul 1977	Stade Louis II, Fontvieille, Monte Carlo, Monaco	Retained WBA, WBC, and The Ring middleweight titles
99	Win	86–3–9 (1)	Rodrigo Valdez	UD	15	26 Jun 1976	Stade Louis II, Fontvieille, Monte Carlo, Monaco	Retained WBA and The Ring middleweight titles; Won WBC middleweight title
98	Win	85–3–9 (1)	Gratien Tonna	KO	5 (15)	13 Dec 1975	Nouvelle Hippodrome, Paris, Île-de-France, France	Retained WBA and The Ring middleweight titles
97	Win	84–3–9 (1)	Tony Licata	TKO	10 (15), 2:43	30 Jun 1975	Madison Square Garden, New York, New York, U.S.	Retained WBA and The Ring middleweight titles
96	Win	83–3–9 (1)	Tony Mundine	KO	7 (15), 1:20	5 Oct 1974	Estadio Luna Park, Buenos Aires, Distrito Federal, Argentina	Retained WBA and The Ring middleweight titles
95	Win	82–3–9 (1)	José Nápoles	RTD	7 (15), 3:00	9 Feb 1974	Puteaux, Hauts-de-Seine, France	Retained WBA, WBC, and The Ring middleweight titles
94	Win	81–3–9 (1)	Jean-Claude Bouttier	UD	15	29 Sep 1973	Stade Roland Garros, Paris, Île-de-France, France	Retained WBA, WBC, and The Ring middleweight titles
93	Win	80–3–9 (1)	Emile Griffith	UD	15	2 Jun 1973	Stade Louis II, Fontvieille, Monte Carlo, Monaco	Retained WBA, WBC, and The Ring middleweight titles
92	Win	79–3–9 (1)	Roy Dale	KO	5 (10), 2:40	5 May 1973	Palazzetto dello Sport, Rome, Lazio, Italy	
91	Win	78–3–9 (1)	Bennie Briscoe	UD	15	11 Nov 1972	Estadio Luna Park, Buenos Aires, Distrito Federal, Argentina	Retained WBA, WBC, and The Ring middleweight titles
90	Win	77–3–9 (1)	Tom Bogs	TKO	5 (15), 2:30	19 Aug 1972	Idrætspark, Copenhagen, Denmark	Retained WBA, WBC, and The Ring middleweight titles
89	Win	76–3–9 (1)	Jean-Claude Bouttier	TKO	13 (15), 3:00	17 Jun 1972	Colombes Stadium, Paris, Île-de-France, France	Retained WBA, WBC, and The Ring middleweight titles
88	Win	75–3–9 (1)	Denny Moyer	TKO	5 (15), 1:50	4 Mar 1972	Palazzetto dello Sport, Rome, Lazio, Italy	Retained WBA, WBC, and The Ring middleweight titles
87	Win	74–3–9 (1)	Fraser Scott	TKO	3 (10), 0:01	4 Dec 1971	Estadio Luna Park, Buenos Aires, Distrito Federal, Argentina	
86	Win	73–3–9 (1)	Emile Griffith	TKO	14 (15), 2:32	25 Sep 1971	Estadio Luna Park, Buenos Aires, Distrito Federal, Argentina	Retained WBA, WBC, and The Ring middleweight titles
85	Win	72–3–9 (1)	Nino Benvenuti	TKO	3 (15), 1:05	8 May 1971	Stade Louis II, Fontvieille, Monte Carlo, Monaco	Retained WBA, WBC, and The Ring middleweight titles
84	Win	71–3–9 (1)	Roy Lee	KO	2 (10)	6 Mar 1971	Santa Fe, Santa Fe, Argentina	
83	Win	70–3–9 (1)	Domingo Guerrero	KO	2 (10)	19 Feb 1971	Salta, Salta, Argentina	
82	Win	69–3–9 (1)	Charley Austin	KO	2 (10), 2:09	19 Dec 1970	Estadio Luna Park, Buenos Aires, Distrito Federal, Argentina	
81	Win	68–3–9 (1)	Nino Benvenuti	TKO	12 (15), 1:57	7 Nov 1970	PalaEur, Rome, Lazio, Italy	Won WBA, WBC, and The Ring middleweight titles
80	Win	67–3–9 (1)	Santiago Rosa	KO	4 (10)	19 Sep 1970	Estadio Luna Park, Buenos Aires, Distrito Federal, Argentina	
79	Win	66–3–9 (1)	Eddie Pace	PTS	10	18 Jul 1970	Estadio Luna Park, Buenos Aires, Distrito Federal, Argentina	
78	Win	65–3–9 (1)	Adolfo Jorge Cardozo	TKO	3 (10)	18 Apr 1970	Estadio Luna Park, Buenos Aires, Distrito Federal, Argentina	
77	Win	64–3–9 (1)	Juan Aguilar	RTD	9 (10)	7 Mar 1970	Santa Fe, Santa Fe, Argentina	
76	Win	63–3–9 (1)	Antonio Aguilar	KO	5 (12)	11 Feb 1970	Mar del Plata, Buenos Aires, Argentina	Retained Argentina (FAB) middleweight title
75	Win	62–3–9 (1)	Carlos Estrada	KO	2 (10)	12 Dec 1969	Santa Fe, Santa Fe, Argentina	
74	Win	61–3–9 (1)	Manoel Severino	KO	6 (12)	27 Sep 1969	Estadio Luna Park, Buenos Aires, Distrito Federal, Argentina	Retained South American middleweight title
73	Win	60–3–9 (1)	Emilio Ale Ali	TKO	7 (10)	5 Sep 1969	San Miguel, Tucumán, Argentina	
72	Win	59–3–9 (1)	Tom Bethea	PTS	10	9 Aug 1969	Buenos Aires, Distrito Federal, Argentina	
71	Win	58–3–9 (1)	Harold Richardson	KO	3 (10)	5 Jul 1969	Buenos Aires, Distrito Federal, Argentina	
70	Win	57–3–9 (1)	Carlos Alberto Salinas	TKO	7 (10)	6 Jun 1969	Paraná, Entre Ríos, Argentina	
69	Draw	56–3–9 (1)	Carlos Alberto Salinas	PTS	10	25 Apr 1969	Recreativo Bochas Club, Paraná, Entre Ríos, Argentina	
68	Win	56–3–8 (1)	Mario Taborda	KO	3 (10)	14 Mar 1969	Club Sportivo, Presidencia Roque Saenz Pena, Chaco, Argentina	
67	Win	55–3–8 (1)	Ruben Orrico	KO	9 (12)	10 Jan 1969	Santa Fe, Santa Fe, Argentina	Retained South American middleweight title
66	Win	54–3–8 (1)	Emilio Ale Ali	PTS	10	20 Dec 1968	Mendoza, Mendoza, Argentina	
65	Win	53–3–8 (1)	Johnny Brooks	PTS	10	7 Dec 1968	Estadio Luna Park, Buenos Aires, Distrito Federal, Argentina	
64	Win	52–3–8 (1)	Charley Austin	UD	10	23 Oct 1968	Estadio Luna Park, Buenos Aires, Distrito Federal, Argentina	
63	Win	51–3–8 (1)	Doug Huntley	KO	4 (10)	14 Aug 1968	Buenos Aires, Distrito Federal, Argentina	
62	Win	50–3–8 (1)	Benito Sanchez	KO	4 (10)	5 Jul 1968	Chaco, Chaco, Argentina	
61	Win	49–3–8 (1)	Juan Aguilar	PTS	10	20 Jun 1968	Buenos Aires, Distrito Federal, Argentina	
60	Win	48–3–8 (1)	Alberto Massi	PTS	10	17 May 1968	Córdoba, Córdoba, Argentina	
59	Draw	47–3–8 (1)	Juan Aguilar	PTS	10	5 Apr 1968	Mendoza, Mendoza, Argentina	
58	Win	47–3–7 (1)	Tito Marshall	PTS	10	18 Nov 1967	Buenos Aires, Distrito Federal, Argentina	
57	Win	46–3–7 (1)	Ramon D Rocha	KO	7 (10)	20 Oct 1967	San Juan, La Rioja, Argentina	
56	Win	45–3–7 (1)	Carlos Estrada	KO	7 (10)	6 Oct 1967	Trelew, Chubut, Argentina	
55	Win	44–3–7 (1)	Ramon D Rocha	PTS	10	8 Sep 1967	Rosario, Santa Fe, Argentina	
54	Win	43–3–7 (1)	Tito Marshall	PTS	10	16 Aug 1967	Estadio Luna Park, Buenos Aires, Distrito Federal, Argentina	
53	Win	42–3–7 (1)	Antonio Aguilar	KO	9 (10)	29 Jul 1967	Estadio Luna Park, Buenos Aires, Distrito Federal, Argentina	
52	Win	41–3–7 (1)	Jorge Fernandez	UD	12	10 Jun 1967	Estadio Luna Park, Buenos Aires, Distrito Federal, Argentina	Won South American middleweight title
51	Draw	40–3–7 (1)	Bennie Briscoe	PTS	12	6 May 1967	Estadio Luna Park, Buenos Aires, Distrito Federal, Argentina	
50	Win	40–3–6 (1)	Benito Sanchez	TKO	3 (10)	9 Apr 1967	Santa Elena, Entre Ríos, Argentina	
49	Win	39–3–6 (1)	Angel Alberto Coria	KO	6 (10)	25 Mar 1967	Mar del Plata, Buenos Aires, Argentina	
48	Win	38–3–6 (1)	Osvaldo Marino	KO	7 (10)	9 Mar 1967	Santa Fe, Santa Fe, Argentina	
47	Win	37–3–6 (1)	Alberto Massi	PTS	10	15 Feb 1967	San Francisco, Santa Fe, Argentina	
46	Win	36–3–6 (1)	Eudoro Robledo	KO	4 (10)	27 Jan 1967	Charata, Chaco, Argentina	
45	Win	35–3–6 (1)	Carlos Alberto Salinas	KO	8 (10)	13 Jan 1967	Santa Fe, Santa Fe, Argentina	
44	Win	34–3–6 (1)	Marcelo Farias	KO	3 (10)	23 Dec 1966	San Cristóbal, Santa Fe, Argentina	
43	Win	33–3–6 (1)	Alberto Massi	TKO	8 (10)	2 Dec 1966	Santa Fe, Santa Fe, Argentina	
42	Win	32–3–6 (1)	Luis Antonio Pereyra	TKO	2 (10)	18 Nov 1966	Santa Fe, Santa Fe, Argentina	
41	Win	31–3–6 (1)	Angel Alberto Coria	PTS	10	1 Nov 1966	Mar del Plata, Buenos Aires, Argentina	
40	Win	30–3–6 (1)	Jorge Fernandez	UD	12	3 Sep 1966	Estadio Luna Park, Buenos Aires, Distrito Federal, Argentina	Won Argentina (FAB) middleweight title
39	Win	29–3–6 (1)	Benito Sanchez	KO	4 (10)	8 Jul 1966	San Pereyra, Argentina	
38	Draw	28–3–6 (1)	Ubaldo Marcos Bustos	PTS	10	3 Jun 1966	Río Gallegos, Santa Cruz, Argentina	
37	Win	28–3–5 (1)	Ismael Hamze	TKO	9 (10)	29 Apr 1966	San Nicolas, Santiago del Estero, Argentina	
36	Win	27–3–5 (1)	Norberto Juncos	KO	7 (10)	17 Feb 1966	Santa Fe, Santa Fe, Argentina	
35	Win	26–3–5 (1)	Ramon D Rocha	PTS	10	4 Feb 1966	Santa Fe, Santa Fe, Argentina	
34	Win	25–3–5 (1)	Carlos Alberto Salinas	PTS	10	29 Dec 1965	Estadio Luna Park, Buenos Aires, Distrito Federal, Argentina	
33	Win	24–3–5 (1)	Antonio Aguilar	PTS	10	8 Dec 1965	Estadio Luna Park, Buenos Aires, Distrito Federal, Argentina	
32	Win	23–3–5 (1)	Celedonio Lima	KO	5 (10)	17 Nov 1965	Estadio Luna Park, Buenos Aires, Distrito Federal, Argentina	
31	Win	22–3–5 (1)	Gregorio Gomez	PTS	10	6 Oct 1965	Estadio Luna Park, Buenos Aires, Distrito Federal, Argentina	
30	Draw	21–3–5 (1)	Manoel Severino	PTS	8	28 Aug 1965	Rio de Janeiro, Rio de Janeiro, Brazil	
29	Draw	21–3–4 (1)	Manoel Severino	PTS	8	14 Aug 1965	Rio de Janeiro, Rio de Janeiro, Brazil	
28	Win	21–3–3 (1)	Felipe Cambeiro	PTS	8	1 Aug 1965	São Paulo, São Paulo, Brazil	
27	Win	20–3–3 (1)	Alberto Retondo	TKO	8 (10)	14 Jul 1965	Buenos Aires, Distrito Federal, Argentina	
26	Win	19–3–3 (1)	Anibal Cordoba	PTS	10	19 May 1965	Buenos Aires, Distrito Federal, Argentina	
25	Draw	18–3–3 (1)	Emilio Ale Ali	PTS	10	9 Apr 1965	San Miguel, Tucumán, Argentina	
24	Win	18–3–2 (1)	Andres Antonio Selpa	PTS	10	11 Mar 1965	Santa Fe, Santa Fe, Argentina	
23	Draw	17–3–2 (1)	Andres Antonio Selpa	PTS	10	8 Jan 1965	Mar del Plata, Buenos Aires, Argentina	
22	Draw	17–3–1 (1)	Celedonio Lima	PTS	10	18 Nov 1964	Buenos Aires, Distrito Federal, Argentina	
21	Win	17–3 (1)	Francisco Gilabert	RTD	4 (10)	28 Oct 1964	Buenos Aires, Distrito Federal, Argentina	
20	Loss	16–3 (1)	Alberto Massi	UD	10	9 Oct 1964	Cordoba Sport Club, Córdoba, Córdoba, Argentina	
19	Win	16–2 (1)	Francisco Olea	KO	9 (10)	25 Sep 1964	Tostado, Santa Fe, Argentina	
18	Win	15–2 (1)	Americo Vacca	KO	3 (10)	4 Sep 1964	Paraná, Entre Ríos, Argentina	
17	Win	14–2 (1)	Juan Carlos Diaz	KO	9 (10)	14 Aug 1964	Villa Ángela, Chaco, Argentina	
16	Win	13–2 (1)	Walter Villa	KO	9 (10)	24 Jul 1964	Ceres, Santa Fe, Argentina	
15	Win	12–2 (1)	Roberto Eduardo Carabajal	PTS	10	10 Jul 1964	Tostado, Santa Fe, Argentina	
14	Loss	11–2 (1)	Felipe Cambeiro	PTS	8	28 Jun 1964	Auditorium Río TV, Rio de Janeiro, Rio de Janeiro, Brazil	
13	Win	11–1 (1)	Angel Alberto Coria	PTS	8	13 Jun 1964	Mar del Plata, Buenos Aires, Argentina	
12	Win	10–1 (1)	Roberto Eduardo Carabajal	KO	8 (8)	17 Jan 1964	Paraná, Entre Ríos, Argentina	
11	Win	9–1 (1)	Rene Sosa	KO	6 (8)	6 Dec 1963	Paraná, Entre Ríos, Argentina	
10	Win	8–1 (1)	Benito Sanchez	KO	8 (10)	18 Oct 1963	Reconquista, Santa Fe, Argentina	
9	Loss	7–1 (1)	Antonio Aguilar	PTS	10	28 Aug 1963	Estadio Luna Park, Buenos Aires, Distrito Federal, Argentina	
8	Win	7–0 (1)	Lisandro Guzmán	KO	3 (8)	9 Aug 1963	Córdoba, Córdoba, Argentina	
7	Win	6–0 (1)	Andres Cejas	KO	4 (6)	17 Jul 1963	Estadio Luna Park, Buenos Aires, Distrito Federal, Argentina	
6	Win	5–0 (1)	Jose N Rodriguez	KO	5 (6)	31 May 1963	Paraná, Entre Ríos, Argentina	
5	Win	4–0 (1)	Raul Elio Rivas	KO	5 (10)	3 May 1963	Posadas, Misiones, Argentina	
4	Win	3–0 (1)	Mario Suarez	TKO	8 (10)	12 Apr 1963	Posadas, Misiones, Argentina	
3	Win	2–0 (1)	Albino Veron	TKO	2 (6)	9 Apr 1963	Santa Fe, Santa Fe, Argentina	
2	NC	1–0 (1)	Albino Veron	NC	1 (6)	13 Mar 1963	Vila, Santa Fe, Argentina	
1	Win	1–0	Ramón Montenegro	KO	2 (6)	6 Feb 1963	Club Sportivo Ben Hur, Rafaela, Santa Fe, Argentina	

== Titles in boxing ==
=== Major world titles ===
- WBA middleweight champion (160 lbs)
- WBC middleweight champion (160 lbs) (2×)

=== The Ring magazine titles ===
- The Ring middleweight champion (160 lbs)

=== Regional/International titles ===
- Argentina (FAB) middleweight champion (160 lbs)
- South American middleweight champion (160 lbs)

=== Undisputed titles ===
- Undisputed middleweight champion (160 lbs) (2×)

== See also ==
- List of world middleweight boxing champions

Sporting positions
Regional boxing titles
Preceded by Jorge Fernández	South American middleweight champion 10 June 1967 – 1970; Vacated	Vacant Title next held by Antonio Aguilar
World boxing titles
Preceded by Nino Benvenuti	WBA middleweight champion 7 November 1970 – 29 August 1977; Retired	Vacant Title next held by Rodrigo Valdez
Preceded by Nino Benvenuti	WBC middleweight champion 7 November 1970 – 23 April 1974; Stripped	Vacant Title next held by Rodrigo Valdez
Preceded by Nino Benvenuti	The Ring middleweight champion 7 November 1970 – 29 August 1977; Retired	Vacant Title next held by Rodrigo Valdez
Preceded by Nino Benvenuti	Undisputed middleweight champion 7 November 1970 – 23 April 1974; Titles fragmented	Vacant Title next held by Himself
Preceded by Rodrigo Valdez	WBC middleweight champion 26 June 1976 – 29 August 1977; Retired	Vacant Title next held by Rodrigo Valdez
Vacant Title last held by Himself	Undisputed middleweight champion 26 June 1976 – 29 August 1977; Retired	Vacant Title next held by Rodrigo Valdez
Awards
Preceded by (Argentina) Alberto Demiddi	Olimpia de Oro; 1972	Succeeded by (Argentina) Horacio Iglesias
Previous: Inaugural award	Konex de Platino; 1980	Next: Santos Laciar
Middleweight status
Preceded by Dick Tiger	Latest born world champion to die 8 January 1995 – 15 June 2007	Succeeded by Hugo Corro
