= Marcelo Quiñones =

Peruvian boxer

Marcelo Quiñonez (born March 24, 1949, in Surquillo) is a Peruvian former professional boxer who competed from 1971 to 1983. He was one of South America's top ranked middleweights during the 1970s. He also represented Peru at the 1968 Summer Olympics.

== Professional career ==
Quiñones began his professional career as a boxer on September 27, 1971. In his debut Quiñones defeated Carlos Bazán by knockout in Lima.

He added the South American middleweight title with a knockout in twelve rounds victory over Luiz Fabre, on August 9, 1976, in Lima.

Over his professional career Quiñones won 31 bouts, losing 8 and drawing 1, with 18 wins coming via knockout.

== Professional boxing record ==
32 Wins (18 knockouts, 14 decisions), 8 Losses (4 knockouts, 4 decisions), 1 Draw
Result	Record	Opponent	Type	Round	Date	Location	Notes
Loss	14-0	(Panama) Néstor Flores	KO	3	16/12/1983	Guayaquil, Ecuador	
Win	0-1	(Peru) Juan Guzmán	PTS	10	09/10/1982	Huánuco, Peru	
Loss	37-5-2	(Argentina) Jacinto Horácio Fernández	RTD	8	14/03/1980	San Justo, Argentina	Quiñones retired at 0:01 of the eighth round.
Win	16-16-1	(United States) Johnny Heard	UD	10	09/11/1979	Trujillo, Peru	
Win	14-19	(Dominican Republic) José Anglada	KO	2	13/10/1979	Trujillo, Peru	
Loss	15-16	(United States) Johnny Heard	TKO	9	08/06/1979	Lima, Peru	
Win	2-9-4	(Brazil) Mario Martiliano	UD	10	30/03/1979	Lima, Peru	
Draw	28-3	(Argentina) Jacinto Horácio Fernández	TD	2	13/10/1978	Buenos Aires, Argentina	
Loss	30-2-2	(Uruguay) José María Flores Burlón	PTS	12	12/08/1978	Montevideo, Uruguay	South America Middleweight Title.
Loss	26-3	(Argentina) Jacinto Horácio Fernández	PTS	10	10/06/1978	Santa Fe, Argentina	
Loss	20-3	(United States) Tony Chiaverini	KO	3	15/02/1978	Las Vegas, Nevada, U.S.	
Win	6-8-1	(United States) Larry Davis	UD	10	14/10/1977	Lima, Peru	
Win	1-4	(Argentina) Pablo Alberto Ferreyra	PTS	10	09/09/1977	Lima, Peru	
Loss	35-2-1	(Argentina) Hugo Corro	SD	12	09/05/1977	Lima, Peru	South America Middleweight Title.
Win	45-20-5	(Brazil) Juárez De Lima	KO	10	01/04/1977	Lima, Peru	
Win	32-27-1	(Trinidad and Tobago) Carlos Marks	UD	10	22/10/1976	Lima, Peru	
Win	28-2-1	(Brazil) Luiz Carlos Fabre	TKO	10	09/08/1976	Lima, Peru	South America Middleweight Title.
Win	30-14-2	(United States) Manuel Fierro	KO	8	21/05/1976	Lima, Peru	Fierro knocked out at 1:53 of the eighth round.
Win	20-29-5	(Puerto Rico) Luis Vinales	TKO	5	14/02/1976	Panama City, Panama	Referee stopped the bout at 2:30 of the fifth round.
Win	12-10	(United States) Thurman Holliday	KO	9	19/12/1975	Lima, Peru	
Win	22-14	(United States) Roy Dale	PTS	10	26/11/1975	Lima, Peru	
Win	22-8-7	(Argentina) Rodolfo Rosales	KO	7	17/10/1975	Lima, Peru	
Win	3-4	(Brazil) Alipio Colli	TKO	4	31/08/1975	Lima, Peru	
Win	10-6	(The Bahamas) Sammy Barr	TKO	4	04/07/1975	Trujillo, Peru	
Win	3-3	(Uruguay) José Fellotti	TKO	4	19/05/1975	Lima, Peru	
Win	7-13-2	(Panama) Dino Del Cid	KO	8	25/04/1975	Lima, Peru	
Win	7-8	(Argentina) Daniel Nicolas Quiroga	KO	3	31/03/1975	Lima, Peru	
Win	0-2-1	(Uruguay) Luis Bidela	PTS	10	15/11/1974	Lima, Peru	
Win	--	Orlando Assumpcão	KO	3	23/02/1974	Lima, Peru	
Win	9-19-4	(Argentina) Ruben Martínez	PTS	10	12/12/1973	Arequipa, Peru	
Win	1-1	(Argentina) Orlando Maximo Nasul	PTS	10	05/10/1973	Lima, Peru	
Win	4-10	(Argentina) Domingo Guerrero	TKO	1	07/07/1973	Lima, Peru	
Loss	14-2-2	(Argentina) Rodolfo Rosales	PTS	10	19/05/1973	Buenos Aires, Argentina	
Win	5-3	(Argentina) Daniel Nicolas Quiroga	PTS	10	07/10/1972	Lima, Peru	
Win	3-2	(Argentina) Faustino Galdame	KO	7	15/07/1972	Mendoza, Argentina	
Win	5-2	(Argentina) Daniel Nicolas Quiroga	PTS	10	02/06/1972	Mendoza, Argentina	
Win	--	(Ecuador) Luis Mora	PTS	8	21/01/1972	Lima, Peru	
Win	1-2	(Chile) Roman Aburto	KO	1	10/12/1971	Lima, Peru	
Win	0-1	(Peru) Marcos Tordoya	PTS	6	19/11/1971	Lima, Peru	
Win	0-2	Francisco Latapiat	KO	1	29/10/1971	Lima, Peru	
Win	3-5	(Peru) Carlos Bazan	KO	1	27/09/1971	Lima, Peru	
