= Bennie Briscoe =

American boxer

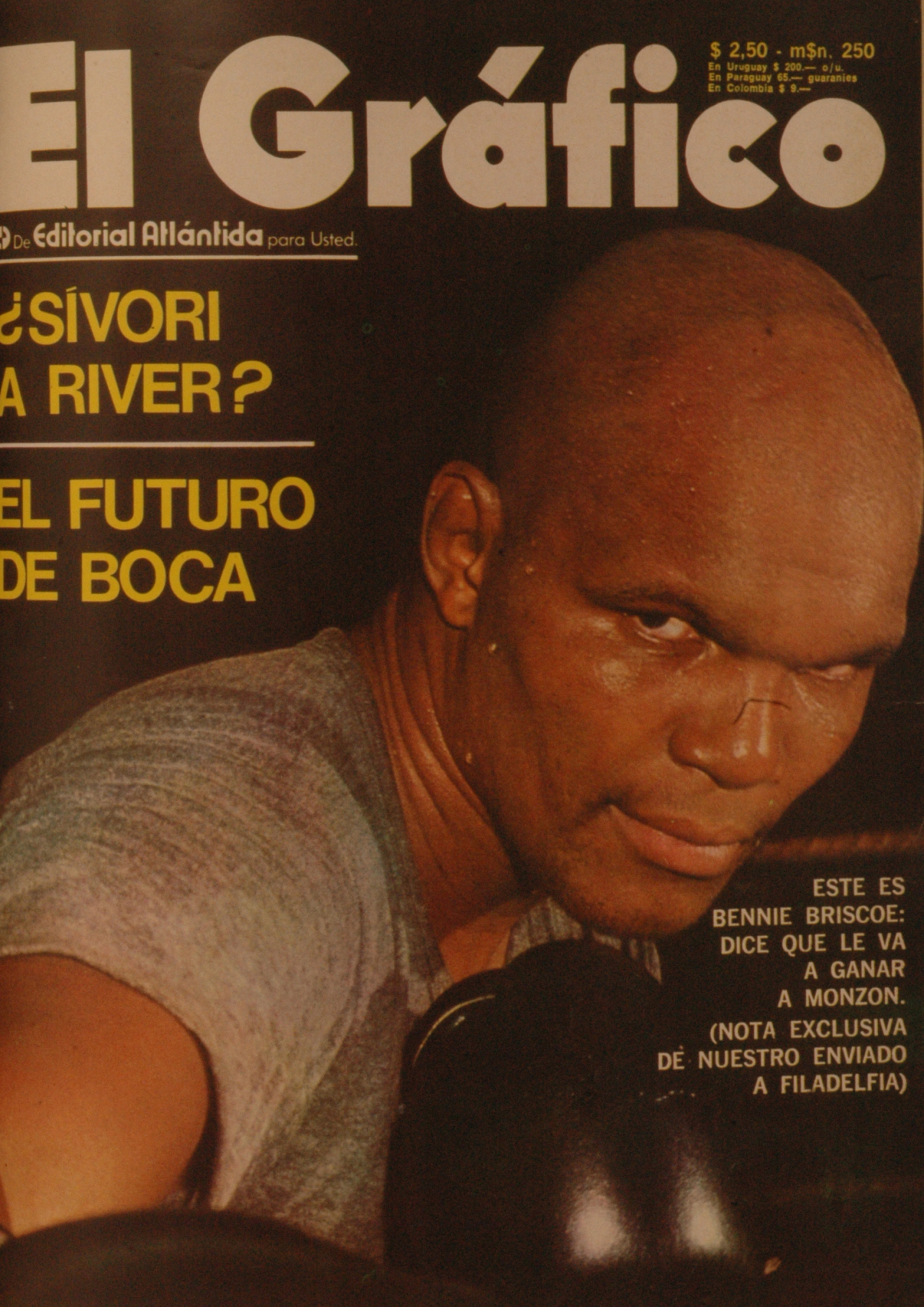
- Briscoe in a 1972 cover of Argentina magazine

Personal information
- Nickname: Bad
- Born: Bennie Briscoe; February 8, 1943 Augusta, Georgia, United States
- Died: December 28, 2010 (aged 67) Philadelphia, Pennsylvania United States
- Height: 5 ft 8 in (1.73 m)
- Weight: Super Middleweight; Middleweight; Super Welterweight; Welterweight

Boxing career
- Reach: 71 in (180 cm)
- Stance: Orthodox

Boxing record
- Total fights: 96
- Wins: 66
- Win by KO: 53
- Losses: 24
- Draws: 5
- No contests: 1
Medal record
U.S. National Championships
Silver medal – second place	1962 Cincinnati	Welterweight

Bennie Briscoe (February 8, 1943 – December 28, 2010) was an American professional boxer. A fan favorite for his punching power, he was known as the "quintessential Philadelphia boxer," and one of the greatest fighters of his era who due to various reasons did not become a world champion.

"Bad" Bennie fought from 1962 to 1982, and retired with a career record of 66 wins (53 by KO) 24 losses and 5 draws. Briscoe was a top-rated middleweight contender during the 1970s, unsuccessfully challenging twice for the undisputed world middleweight title and once for the WBC version. Notable world champions and contenders Briscoe fought included Marvin Hagler, Carlos Monzon, Rodrigo Valdez, Luis Rodríguez, Vicente Rondon, Tony Mundine, Vito Antuofermo, Eddie Mustafa Muhammad, Emile Griffith, and Cyclone Hart.

Cus D'Amato regarded Briscoe much higher than most of his highly decorated opponents in many respects, particularly for his determination, intimidating posture, constant forward movement, aggressiveness, iron jaw, and ability to absorb punches no matter how solid he was hit, creating an impression of irresistible force to great many of his opponents. Briscoe's relentless walk-forward style earned him a nickname "Black Robot" while fighting abroad (for that reason, French cartoonist Dero portrayed Briscoe as a robot with hammers instead of arms, forcing even such aggressive fighters as Hagler and Monzon to back-up consistently. He was also sometimes referred to as "the fighting trashman," because he balanced his training early in his career with a day job as a sanitation worker in South Philadelphia.

== Early life ==
Briscoe was born in Augusta, Georgia, to a poor family, one of fourteen children. Usually bold Briscoe said that the reason his hair is cut very short is that "When you're one of fourteen children they can't waste too much money on haircuts," and when he used to go to the barbershop, his father would say "Take it all off." Motivated by his family's poverty, at the age of 16, he moved from Augusta, where he was a star athlete in football and track and field, to Philadelphia, Pennsylvania to live with an aunt and uncle and attended Simon Gratz High School. There, he eventually began training alongside Joe Frazier, hence is his familiar bobbing-and-weaving style.

Briscoe supported his family, and his mother in particular, sending home a bit of each payday. He worked a series of municipal jobs, including as a sewer inlet cleaner and rat control officer. He eventually took a job with the sanitation department, working on a trash route in South Philadelphia as he continued to train as a boxer. A union worker, he was a member of AFSCME District Council 33.

== Amateur career ==
Briscoe had a standout career as an amateur, compiling a record of 70–3. He won the Middle Atlantic AAU title three times, the last in 1962 at Convention Hall in Philadelphia. Though he did not make it to win the United States National Boxing Championships in Pocatello, April 7, 1961, and in Cincinnati, March 31, 1962, losing to H.C. Massey and to Wade Smith respectively. He turned pro shortly thereafter, being coached by Quinzel McCall.

Despite going pro, Briscoe knew that the life of a boxer could be financially unstable and risky—and wanted to retain his union pension plan—so he continued his work on the trash route his entire career.

== Professional career ==
Bennie was known for his toughness, strong punch and body punching. He fought future middleweight champion Monzon to a draw in Buenos Aires on May 6, 1967, but dropped a 15-round decision to the champion in a 1972 title match.

By the end of 1972, having 56 professional fights under his belt, Briscoe has been floored only three times in his career, twice in the same fight in the 1st round against Rafael Gutierrez, which he ended with a knockout victory in the 2nd round. Among his first-round victories was also a one-punch-knockout over former No. 1 welterweight contender Charlie Scott, a further proof of his outstanding punching power.

Briscoe was outpointed by former welterweight and middleweight king Emile Griffith in their first match, but fought Griffith to a draw in a rematch. He was outpointed by future middleweight champions Marvin Hagler and Vito Antuofermo on the downside of his career.

Bennie also fought Rodrigo Valdes three times. He was outpointed twice, but Valdez scored a rare KO over Briscoe in an elimination match to determine the WBC middleweight champion on May 25, 1974 - it was the only time in 96 fights that Briscoe was ever stopped. The WBC had decided to "strip" Monzon of its version of the middleweight crown, although the rest of the world continued to recognize Monzon as champion.

In March 1981, neurosurgeon Dr. Fred Sonstein sought to use CAT scans in an attempt to track the degeneration of boxers' cognitive functions after seeing the decline of Briscoe's speech abilities.

Briscoe was one of the most feared middleweights of his era. In 2003, he was named in The Ring's list of 100 greatest punchers of all time. His final record was 66-24-5 with 53 knockouts and one no contest.

Briscoe fought with the Star of David on his boxing trunks in tribute to his managers, first Jimmy Iselin, whose father Phil owned the New York Jets, and Arnold M. Weiss.

== Death ==
Bennie Briscoe died on December 28, 2010, due to a short illness affecting his declining health. His funeral services were held on January 10, 2011, at Deliverance Evangelistic Church. He was survived by his mother, his wife and his five children.

== Professional boxing record ==
66 Wins (53 knockouts, 13 decisions), 24 Losses (1 knockout, 23 decisions), 5 Draws, 1 No Contest
Result	Opp. Record	Opponent	Type	Round	Date	Location	Notes
Loss	66–24–5 (1)	(United States) Jimmie Sykes	UD	10	15/12/1982	(United States) The Blue Horizon, Philadelphia, Pennsylvania, U.S.	
Loss	66–23–5 (1)	(Canada) Ralph Hollett	SD	10	01/06/1982	Halifax Forum, Halifax, Nova Scotia, Canada	
Win	66–22–5 (1)	(United States) Norberto Sabater	TKO	5	23/03/1982	(United States) Tropicana Hotel & Casino, Atlantic City, New Jersey, U.S.	
Win	65–22–5 (1)	(United States) Rick Noggle	KO	6	23/12/1981	(United States) Canton Memorial Civic Center, Canton, Ohio, U.S.	
Loss	64–22–5 (1)	(Puerto Rico) Nick Ortiz	SD	10	30/01/1981	(United States) Felt Forum, New York City, New York, U.S.	
Loss	64–21–5 (1)	(United States) Vinnie Curto	PTS	10	15/12/1980	(United States) Hynes Convention Center, Boston, Massachusetts, U.S.	
Win	64–20–5 (1)	(United States) Richie Bennett	PTS	10	25/08/1980	(United States) Martin Luther King Arena, Philadelphia, Pennsylvania, U.S.	
Loss	63–20–5 (1)	(United States) Richie Bennett	UD	10	24/01/1980	(United States) Upper Darby Forum, Upper Darby Township, Pennsylvania, U.S.	
Loss	63–19–5 (1)	(Luxembourg) Clement Tshinza	PTS	10	20/10/1979	Country Hall du Sart Tilman, Liège, Belgium	
Win	63–18–5 (1)	(United States) Teddy Mann	UD	10	11/09/1979	(United States) Philadelphia Spectrum, Philadelphia, Pennsylvania, U.S.	
Win	62–18–5 (1)	(United States) Joe Barrientes	TKO	6	14/08/1979	(United States) Steel Pier Arena, Atlantic City, New Jersey, U.S.	
Win	61–18–5 (1)	(Puerto Rico) Nick Ortiz	PTS	10	23/05/1979	(United States) DC Armory, Washington, D.C., U.S.	
Loss	60–18–5 (1)	(United States) David Love	UD	10	05/02/1979	(United States) Philadelphia Spectrum, Philadelphia, Pennsylvania, U.S.	
Loss	60–17–5 (1)	(United States) Marvin Hagler	UD	10	24/08/1978	(United States) Philadelphia Spectrum, Philadelphia, Pennsylvania, U.S.	
Win	60–16–5 (1)	(United States) Bob Patterson	KO	5	24/05/1978	(United States) Philadelphia Spectrum, Philadelphia, Pennsylvania, U.S.	Patterson knocked out at 0:31 of the fifth round.
Win	59–16–5 (1)	(United States) Tony Chiaverini	TKO	8	31/03/1978	(United States) Kansas City Municipal Auditorium, Kansas City, Missouri, U.S.	Referee stopped the bout at 1:05 of the eighth round.
Loss	58–16–5 (1)	(Italy) Vito Antuofermo	UD	10	04/02/1978	(United States) Madison Square Garden, New York City, New York, U.S.	
Loss	58–15–5 (1)	(Colombia) Rodrigo Valdez	UD	15	05/11/1977	Campione d'Italia, Italy	WBA/WBC Middleweight Title.
Win	58–14–5 (1)	(The Bahamas) Sammy Barr	TKO	8	26/07/1977	(United States) Philadelphia Spectrum, Philadelphia, Pennsylvania, U.S.	
Win	57–14–5 (1)	(France) Jean Mateo	KO	10	31/03/1977	Pavillon de Paris, Paris, France	
Win	56–14–5 (1)	(United States) Karl Vinson	UD	10	17/01/1977	(United States) Philadelphia Spectrum, Philadelphia, Pennsylvania, U.S.	
Draw	55–14–5 (1)	(United States) Willie Warren	PTS	10	20/12/1976	Salle Leyrit, Nice, France	
Win	55–14–4 (1)	(Mexico) Emeterio Villanueva	TKO	4	16/08/1976	(United States) Philadelphia Spectrum, Philadelphia, Pennsylvania, U.S.	
Draw	54–14–4 (1)	(United States Virgin Islands) Emile Griffith	PTS	10	26/06/1976	Stade Louis II, Monte Carlo, Monaco	
Win	54–14–3 (1)	(United States) Eugene Hart	KO	1	06/04/1976	(United States) Philadelphia Spectrum, Philadelphia, Pennsylvania, U.S.	Hart knocked out at 1:49 of the first round.
Win	53–14–3 (1)	(United States) Jose Martin Flores	KO	7	25/02/1976	(United States) Philadelphia Arena, Philadelphia, Pennsylvania, U.S.	Flores knocked out at 2:45 of the seventh round.
Draw	52–14–3 (1)	(United States) Eugene Hart	PTS	10	18/11/1975	(United States) Philadelphia Spectrum, Philadelphia, Pennsylvania, U.S.	
Win	52–14–2 (1)	(United States) Eddie Mustafa Muhammad	SD	10	18/08/1975	(United States) Philadelphia Spectrum, Philadelphia, Pennsylvania, U.S.	
Win	51–14–2 (1)	(United States) Stanley Hayward	UD	10	16/06/1975	(United States) Philadelphia Spectrum, Philadelphia, Pennsylvania, U.S.	
Draw	50–14–2 (1)	(United States) Vinnie Curto	PTS	10	07/04/1975	(United States) Philadelphia Spectrum, Philadelphia, Pennsylvania, U.S.	
Win	50–14–1 (1)	(United States) Lenny Harden	KO	10	14/01/1975	(United States) Philadelphia Spectrum, Philadelphia, Pennsylvania, U.S.	Harden knocked out at 1:36 of the tenth round.
Loss	49–14–1 (1)	(United States Virgin Islands) Emile Griffith	MD	10	09/10/1974	(United States) Philadelphia Spectrum, Philadelphia, Pennsylvania, U.S.	
Loss	49–13–1 (1)	(Colombia) Rodrigo Valdez	TKO	7	25/05/1974	Stade Louis II, Monte Carlo, Monaco	WBC Middleweight Title.
Win	49–12–1 (1)	(Australia) Tony Mundine	KO	5	25/02/1974	Palais des Sports, Paris, France	
Win	48–12–1 (1)	(United States) Willie Warren	TKO	7	08/12/1973	(United States) Boardwalk Hall, Atlantic City, New Jersey, U.S.	Referee stopped the bout at 1:52 of the seventh round.
Win	47–12–1 (1)	(Argentina) Ruben Arocha	KO	3	22/10/1973	(United States) Philadelphia Spectrum, Philadelphia, Pennsylvania, U.S.	Arocha knocked out at 1:24 of the third round.
Loss	46–12–1 (1)	(Colombia) Rodrigo Valdez	PTS	12	01/09/1973	Noumea, New Caledonia	NABF Middleweight Title.
Win	46–11–1 (1)	(United States) Billy Douglas	TKO	8	25/06/1973	(United States) Philadelphia Spectrum, Philadelphia, Pennsylvania, U.S.	NABF Middleweight Title. Referee stopped the bout at 2:42 of the eighth round.
Win	45–11–1 (1)	(United States) Art Hernandez	TKO	3	26/03/1973	(United States) Philadelphia Spectrum, Philadelphia, Pennsylvania, U.S.	NABF Middleweight Title. Referee stopped the bout at 1:19 of the third round.
Win	44–11–1 (1)	(Argentina) Carlos Alberto Salinas	KO	5	29/01/1973	(United States) Philadelphia Spectrum, Philadelphia, Pennsylvania, U.S.	Salinas knocked out at 2:22 of the fifth round.
Loss	43–11–1 (1)	(Argentina) Carlos Monzón	UD	15	11/11/1972	Estadio Luna Park, Buenos Aires, Argentina	WBA/WBC Middleweight Titles.
Win	43–10–1 (1)	(Puerto Rico) Luis Vinales	TKO	7	11/10/1972	(United States) Philadelphia Arena, Philadelphia, Pennsylvania, U.S.	Referee stopped the bout at 2:41 of the seventh round.
Loss	42–10–1 (1)	(Puerto Rico) Luis Vinales	SD	10	19/04/1972	(United States) Catholic Youth Center, Scranton, Pennsylvania, U.S.	Referee stopped the bout at 2:41 of the seventh round.
Win	42–9–1 (1)	(Mexico) Jorge Rosales	KO	1	21/03/1972	(United States) Philadelphia Arena, Philadelphia, Pennsylvania, U.S.	Rosales knocked out at 2:28 of the first round.
Win	41–9–1 (1)	(United States) Al Quinney	TKO	2	18/01/1972	(United States) Philadelphia Arena, Philadelphia, Pennsylvania, U.S.	Referee stopped the bout at 1:35 of the second round.
Win	40–9–1 (1)	(Mexico) Rafael Gutierrez	KO	2	15/11/1971	(United States) Philadelphia Spectrum, Philadelphia, Pennsylvania, U.S.	Gutierrez knocked out at 2:17 of the second round.
Win	39–9–1 (1)	(United States) Charley Austin	TKO	1	14/10/1971	(United States) Philadelphia Arena, Philadelphia, Pennsylvania, U.S.	Referee stopped the bout at 1:46 of the first round.
Win	38–9–1 (1)	(Brazil) Juarez de Lima	TKO	2	10/08/1971	(United States) Philadelphia Spectrum, Philadelphia, Pennsylvania, U.S.	
Win	37–9–1 (1)	(Trinidad and Tobago) Carlos Marks	KO	5	03/05/1971	(United States) Philadelphia Arena, Philadelphia, Pennsylvania, U.S.	Marks knocked out at 0:31 of the fifth round.
Win	36–9–1 (1)	(United States) Tom Bethea	TKO	6	22/03/1971	(United States) Philadelphia Arena, Philadelphia, Pennsylvania, U.S.	
Win	35–9–1 (1)	(United States) Ned Edwards	KO	2	12/01/1971	(United States) The Blue Horizon, Philadelphia, Pennsylvania, U.S.	Edwards knocked out at 2:25 of the second round.
Win	34–9–1 (1)	(United States) Harold Richardson	TKO	6	02/11/1970	(United States) Philadelphia Arena, Philadelphia, Pennsylvania, U.S.	
Win	33–9–1 (1)	(United States) Eddie Owens	KO	6	23/09/1970	(United States) The Blue Horizon, Philadelphia, Pennsylvania, U.S.	Owens knocked out at 1:22 of the sixth round.
Win	32–9–1 (1)	(United States) Joe Shaw	TKO	7	16/03/1970	(United States) Philadelphia Arena, Philadelphia, Pennsylvania, U.S.	
Loss	31–9–1 (1)	(United States) Joe Shaw	MD	10	18/11/1969	(United States) Philadelphia Spectrum, Philadelphia, Pennsylvania, U.S.	
Win	31–8–1 (1)	(Panama) Tito Marshall	KO	1	30/09/1969	(United States) The Blue Horizon, Philadelphia, Pennsylvania, U.S.	Marshall knocked out at 0:52 of the first round.
Win	30–8–1 (1)	(United States) Percy Manning	KO	4	19/05/1969	(United States) Philadelphia Arena, Philadelphia, Pennsylvania, U.S.	Manning knocked out at 2:06 of the fourth round.
Win	29–8–1 (1)	(Puerto Rico) José González	TKO	5	10/03/1969	(United States) Madison Square Garden, New York City, New York, U.S.	
Loss	28–8–1 (1)	(Brazil) Juarez de Lima	SD	10	14/02/1969	(United States) Felt Forum, New York City, New York, U.S.	
Win	28–7–1 (1)	(Venezuela) Vicente Rondón	TKO	8	26/01/1969	San Juan, Puerto Rico	
Win	27–7–1 (1)	(United States) Charley Austin	SD	10	18/11/1968	(United States) Philadelphia Spectrum, Philadelphia, Pennsylvania, U.S.	
Win	26–7–1 (1)	(Cuba) Pedro Miranda	KO	7	02/11/1968	San Juan, Puerto Rico	
Loss	25–7–1 (1)	(Venezuela) Vicente Rondón	UD	10	23/09/1968	Hiram Bithorn Stadium, San Juan, Puerto Rico	
Win	25–6–1 (1)	(Puerto Rico) José González	UD	10	20/08/1968	(United States) Madison Square Garden, New York City, New York, U.S.	
Win	24–6–1 (1)	(United States) Gene Bryant	TKO	8	07/08/1968	(United States) Silver Slipper, Paradise, Nevada, U.S.	
Loss	23–6–1 (1)	(France) Yoland Levèque	DQ	4	25/03/1968	Palais des Sports, Paris, France	
Loss	23–5–1 (1)	(Cuba) Luis Manuel Rodríguez	UD	10	15/12/1967	(United States) Madison Square Garden, New York City, New York, U.S.	
Win	23–4–1 (1)	(United States) Jimmy Lester	TKO	6	20/11/1967	(United States) Philadelphia Convention Hall, Philadelphia, Pennsylvania, U.S.	Referee stopped the bout at 1:53 of the sixth round.
Win	22–4–1 (1)	(United States) Ike White	TKO	3	30/10/1967	(United States) Philadelphia Arena, Philadelphia, Pennsylvania, U.S.	
Win	21–4–1 (1)	(United States) Georgie Johnson	TKO	4	09/10/1967	(United States) Philadelphia Arena, Philadelphia, Pennsylvania, U.S.	Referee stopped the bout at 1:51 of the fourth round.
Win	20–4–1 (1)	(United States) Bobby Warthen	TKO	7	29/05/1967	(United States) Philadelphia Arena, Philadelphia, Pennsylvania, U.S.	Referee stopped the bout at 1:46 of the seventh round.
Draw	19–4–1 (1)	(Argentina) Carlos Monzón	PTS	10	06/05/1967	Estadio Luna Park, Buenos Aires, Argentina	
Loss	19–4 (1)	(Cuba) Luis Manuel Rodríguez	UD	10	20/03/1967	(United States) Philadelphia Arena, Philadelphia, Pennsylvania, U.S.	
Win	19–3 (1)	(United States) George Benton	RTD	9	05/12/1966	(United States) Philadelphia Arena, Philadelphia, Pennsylvania, U.S.	
Win	18–3 (1)	(United States) C.L. Lewis	TKO	6	10/10/1966	(United States) Philadelphia Arena, Philadelphia, Pennsylvania, U.S.	
NC	17–3 (1)	(United States) C.L. Lewis	NC	4	25/07/1966	(United States) Philadelphia Convention Hall, Philadelphia, Pennsylvania, U.S.	
Loss	17–3	(United States) Stanley Hayward	SD	10	06/12/1965	(United States) Philadelphia Arena, Philadelphia, Pennsylvania, U.S.	
Loss	17–2	(Panama) Tito Marshall	UD	10	20/09/1965	(United States) Philadelphia Convention Hall, Philadelphia, Pennsylvania, U.S.	
Win	17–1	(United States) Doug McLeod	KO	1	10/05/1965	(United States) Philadelphia Arena, Philadelphia, Pennsylvania, U.S.	
Win	16–1	(United States) Jimmy McMillan	KO	1	19/04/1965	(United States) Philadelphia Arena, Philadelphia, Pennsylvania, U.S.	
Loss	15–1	(United States) Percy Manning	PTS	10	29/03/1965	(United States) Philadelphia A.C., Philadelphia, Pennsylvania, U.S.	
Win	15–0	(United States) Dave Wyatt	KO	7	22/02/1965	(United States) Philadelphia A.C., Philadelphia, Pennsylvania, U.S.	
Win	14–0	(United States) Walter Daniels	PTS	8	30/11/1964	(United States) Philadelphia Arena, Philadelphia, Pennsylvania, U.S.	
Win	13–0	(United States) Percy Manning	TKO	8	15/06/1964	(United States) Philadelphia Convention Hall, Philadelphia, Pennsylvania, U.S.	
Win	12–0	(United States) Charley Scott	KO	1	09/03/1964	(United States) Philadelphia Arena, Philadelphia, Pennsylvania, U.S.	Pennsylvania Welterweight Title.
Win	11–0	(United States) Johnny Clyde	PTS	6	20/01/1964	(United States) Philadelphia Arena, Philadelphia, Pennsylvania, U.S.	
Win	10–0	(United States) Bobby Bell	KO	1	02/12/1963	(United States) Philadelphia Arena, Philadelphia, Pennsylvania, U.S.	
Win	9–0	(United States) Roosevelt Ware	TKO	4	11/10/1963	(United States) The Blue Horizon, Philadelphia, Pennsylvania, U.S.	
Win	8–0	(United States) Joe Clark	PTS	4	22/07/1963	(United States) Las Vegas Convention Center, Winchester, Nevada, U.S.	
Win	7–0	(United States) Cash White	TKO	2	25/04/1963	(United States) The Blue Horizon, Philadelphia, Pennsylvania, U.S.	
Win	6–0	(United States) Chuck McCreary	PTS	6	25/03/1963	(United States) Philadelphia Arena, Philadelphia, Pennsylvania, U.S.	
Win	5–0	(United States) Joe Smith	KO	6	28/02/1963	(United States) The Blue Horizon, Philadelphia, Pennsylvania, U.S.	Smith knocked out at 1:47 of the sixth round.
Win	4–0	(United States) Brad Silas	KO	4	11/02/1963	(United States) Cambria A.C., Philadelphia, Pennsylvania, U.S.	
Win	3–0	(United States) Charley Little	KO	1	14/01/1963	(United States) Cambria A.C., Philadelphia, Pennsylvania, U.S.	
Win	2–0	(United States) Dave Wyatt	KO	3	13/12/1962	(United States) The Blue Horizon, Philadelphia, Pennsylvania, U.S.	
Win	1–0	(United States) Sam Samuels	PTS	4	10/09/1962	(United States) Cambria A.C., Philadelphia, Pennsylvania, U.S.	
