= José María Flores Burlón =

Uruguayan boxer

Flores Burlón
Personal information
- Born: José María Flores Burlón; February 10, 1955 (age 71) Montevideo, Uruguay
- Weight: Light heavyweight Cruiserweight

Boxing career

Boxing record
- Total fights: 115
- Wins: 96
- Win by KO: 47
- Losses: 11
- Draws: 8

José María Flores Burlón (born February 10, 1955) is an Uruguayan former professional boxer. Flores Burlón had a total of 115 professional bouts. He challenged once for the WBC Cruiserweight title in 1988.

== Boxing career ==
=== Early career ===
Flores Burlón began his professional boxing career on February 6, 1976, defeating Alejandro García by a six round decision in Pergamino, Argentina. His first fourteen bouts were in Pergamino, he had a record of 13 wins and 1 draw (tie) during that span, the draw coming on September 17 of that same year against Segundo Paiz, over ten rounds.

On January 27, 1977, Flores Burlón had his first fight outside Pergamino, when he outpointed Raul Antonio Paez over ten rounds in Arrecife, Argentina.

Eventually, Flores Burlón built a record of 27 wins, no losses and two draws, with ten knockouts, before he faced Pedro Cesar Duarte, on March 3, 1978 in San Luis, Argentina. Flores Burlón lost for the first time as a professional, when Duarte outpointed him over ten rounds.

=== Championship title ===
After three more victories and one loss, Flores Burlón fought for a title for the first time. His first championship bout also marked his debut in Uruguay. He beat Marcelo Quiñones on August 12, 1978 at Montevideo to win the South American Middleweight title, which had been vacant since Hugo Corro had defeated Rodrigo Valdéz for the world championship.

Flores Burlón lost the South American title in his first defense, being knocked out in round four by Ruben Pardo on January 12, 1979 in Mar del Plata, Argentina.

Flores Burlón then had some career ups and downs, winning 2, losing 2 and drawing 1 of his next five bouts. After losing on November 2 to Rogelio Zarza. After that fight, he began a twelve-fight win streak, when he beat Aldo Carmona by a knockout in eight rounds, on April 24, 1980. Among the twelve victories in that streak were a second round knockout over Zarza, a ten round decision win against Duarte, and a twelve round decision over Pardo on April 25, 1981 in Buenos Aires. His victory over Pardo made him South American Middleweight champion for the second time. On June 13 of that year, Flores Burlón met another well known Middleweight of the area, Juan Roldán. He lost to Roldán by a third round knockout.

=== Fame ===
Flores Burlón began another winning streak when he defeated Jorge Servin by a knockout in five rounds on August 8. He won 19 bouts in a row, including a third fight with Rogelio Zarza, and his United States debut, when he knocked Dornell Wigfall out in six rounds as part of the Michael Spinks vs. Dwight Muhammad Qawi fight's undercard on March 18, 1983 in Atlantic City, New Jersey. By then, Flores Burlón had changed division, becoming a world ranked light heavyweight. Flores Burlón became famous across Latin America, Ring En Español dedicating many articles to him.

Despite being defeated with a second round knockout by Cesar Abel Romero on July 30 of 1983, Flores Burlón was named South American Light Heavyweight champion. He lost that title on his first defense, being knocked out in round one by Juan Carlos Gimenez Ferreyra, on November 13, in Asunción, Paraguay. Almost one year later, on November 10, 1984, he recovered the South American Light Heavyweight title, defeating Victor Robledo by a twelve round decision in Buenos Aires.

=== World Championship try ===
On May 25, 1986, Flores Burlón conquered his third regional belt when he won the South American Cruiserweight title by knocking Hector Pedro Rohr out in the fourth round, at the Argentine city of Necochea. On August 8, he outpointed former world champion Marvin Camel in ten rounds, once again in Buenos Aires. After this win, Flores Burlón was ranked number one among Cruiserweight challengers in the world.

On January 22, 1988, Flores Burlón had his first world title try. Attempting to become Uruguay's first world boxing champion in history, he lost a twelve round unanimous decision to Puerto Rican Carlos de León, the World Boxing Council's champion, in Atlantic City. This would turn out to be the only world championship fight Flores Burlón ever had.

Flores Burlón boxed for twelve more years, winning the WBA's Fedelatin (Latin American) and WBC's mundo Hispano (Hispanic world)'s Light Cruiserweight titles. He retired after beating Reginaldo Dos Santos by a knockout in round six on September 9, 2000, to retain his mundo Latino belt.

=== Overall career ===
Flores Burlón had 96 wins, 11 losses and 8 draws, with 47 knockout wins. He is a resident of Pergamino, Argentina, where he held many of his early professional bouts.

== Professional boxing record ==
96 Wins (47 knockouts, 49 decisions), 11 Losses (6 knockouts, 5 decisions), 8 Draws
Result	Record	Opponent	Type	Round	Date	Location	Notes
Win	3-2-1	(Brazil) Edson Cesar Antonio	RTD	7	29/09/2000	Pergamino, Argentina	WBC Mundo Hispano Cruiserweight Title. Antonio retired at 0:01 of the seventh round.
Win	12-7-1	(Argentina) Raul Esteban Barreto	UD	10	04/08/2000	Pergamino, Argentina	
Win	9-4-2	(Argentina) Aaron Orlando Soria	UD	12	16/06/2000	Pergamino, Argentina	WBC Mundo Hispano Cruiserweight Title.
Win	3-11	(Brazil) Argemiro Antonio dos Santos	KO	2	05/05/2000	Pergamino, Argentina	
Draw	0-1	(Brazil) Edson Cesar Antonio	PTS	8	24/03/2000	Pergamino, Argentina	
Win	30-25-6	(Argentina) Julio Abel Gonzalez	UD	8	18/02/2000	Pergamino, Argentina	
Win	--	(Brazil) Jonatas dos Santos	TKO	6	21/08/1999	Montevideo, Uruguay	Referee stopped the bout at 2:50 of the sixth round.
Win	1-14	(Paraguay) Juan Hipolito Helmann Rivas	KO	1	19/06/1999	Montevideo, Uruguay	
Loss	16-2-2	(United States) Mike Hunter	TKO	1	31/10/1990	Melbourne, Australia	Referee stopped the bout at 2:57 of the first round.
Win	4-0	(Chile) Jaime Manque	KO	6	03/08/1990	Pergamino, Argentina	WBA Fedelatin Cruiserweight Title.
Win	6-5	(Brazil) Emmanuel Brites Camargo	TKO	7	04/11/1989	Montevideo, Uruguay	WBA Fedelatin Cruiserweight Title.
Win	22-14-8	(Argentina) Victor Robledo	UD	12	16/06/1989	Paysandú, Uruguay	WBA Fedelatin Cruiserweight Title.
Win	4-7-1	(Argentina) Raul Venturelli	KO	6	19/05/1989	Paysandú, Uruguay	
Win	0-5	(Argentina) Walter Daniel Bustos	KO	1	14/04/1989	Pergamino, Argentina	
Loss	43-4	(Puerto Rico) Carlos de León	UD	12	22/01/1988	(United States) Atlantic City, New Jersey, U.S.	WBC Cruiserweight Title.
Win	31-30-18	(Argentina) Eduardo Domingo Contreras	PTS	10	18/09/1987	Pergamino, Argentina	
Win	1-2	(Argentina) Alberto Adolfo Ubelart	PTS	10	14/08/1987	Pergamino, Argentina	
Win	4-12-2	(Argentina) Juan Carlos Rodríguez	PTS	10	10/07/1987	Montevideo, Uruguay	
Draw	20-14-9	(Argentina) Juan Carlos Fernández	PTS	10	06/02/1987	Paraná, Argentina	
Win	8-4-4	(United States) Jimmy Bills	PTS	10	22/11/1986	Pergamino, Argentina	
Win	43-6-3	(United States) Marvin Camel	UD	10	08/08/1986	Pergamino, Argentina	
Win	15-8-1	(Argentina) Hector Pedro Rohr	KO	4	25/05/1986	Necochea, Argentina	South American Cruiserweight Title.
Win	1-3-1	(Argentina) Hilario Rufino	KO	3	18/04/1986	Pergamino, Argentina	
Win	15-6-1	(Argentina) Hector Pedro Rohr	PTS	10	21/12/1985	Pergamino, Argentina	
Win	15-5-1	(Argentina) Hector Pedro Rohr	PTS	10	20/12/1985	Pergamino, Argentina	
Win	2-3-1	(Argentina) Pedro Cichero	TKO	7	23/11/1985	Pergamino, Argentina	
Win	8-9-2	(Argentina) Roberto Carlos Cardozo	TKO	5	27/09/1985	Rosario, Argentina	
Win	13-2	(Brazil) Clarismundo Aparecido Silva	TKO	5	24/08/1985	Pergamino, Argentina	South American Light Heavyweight Title.
Win	3-6-2	(Argentina) Juan Carlos Rodríguez	PTS	10	21/07/1985	Villa Ángela, Argentina	
Win	3-12	(Argentina) Juan Jose Leiva	RTD	7	17/05/1985	Daireaux, Argentina	
Win	19-3-5	(Argentina) Victor Robledo	PTS	12	10/11/1984	Buenos Aires, Argentina	South American Light Heavyweight Title.
Draw	28-6-1	(Argentina) Angel Antonio Caro	PTS	10	07/09/1984	Mar del Plata, Argentina	
Loss	26-10-3	(Argentina) Jorge Juan Salgado	PTS	10	16/08/1984	Mendoza, Argentina	
Win	2-5-2	(Argentina) Andres Fidel Olmedo	PTS	10	16/03/1984	Paraná, Argentina	
Loss	11-0	(Paraguay) Juan Carlos Gimenez	KO	1	13/11/1983	Asunción, Paraguay	South American Light Heavyweight Title.
Win	2-4-2	(Argentina) Andres Fidel Olmedo	KO	6	06/10/1983	Asunción, Paraguay	
Win	2-11-1	(Argentina) Irineo Claudio Cabrera	KO	2	17/09/1983	Pergamino, Argentina	
Loss	7-2-3	(Argentina) Cesar Abel Romero	KO	2	30/07/1983	Buenos Aires, Argentina	
Win	0-2-2	(Argentina) Juan Carlos Rodríguez	KO	7	01/07/1983	Pergamino, Argentina	
Win	2-16-5	(Argentina) Aldo Carmona	TKO	2	21/05/1983	General Pico, Argentina	
Win	0-2	Ruben Paredes	KO	1	06/05/1983	Rojas, Argentina	
Win	29-44-8	(Argentina) Obdulio Rogelio Zarza	TKO	5	13/04/1983	Montevideo, Uruguay	
Win	20-5	(United States) Dornell Wigfall	KO	6	18/03/1983	(United States) Atlantic City, New Jersey, U.S.	
Win	2-15-5	(Argentina) Aldo Carmona	PTS	10	23/12/1982	Pergamino, Argentina	
Win	13-17-3	(Chile) Ricardo Molina Ortiz	PTS	10	08/10/1982	Montevideo, Uruguay	
Win	10-6	(United States) Chris Wells	TKO	8	06/08/1982	Montevideo, Uruguay	
Win	24-12-8	(Argentina) Norberto Rufino Cabrera	TKO	9	26/06/1982	Pergamino, Argentina	
Win	23-7-6	(Argentina) Jose Alberto Vega	TKO	2	24/05/1982	Pergamino, Argentina	
Win	2-7	(Argentina) Alfredo Morales	KO	2	07/05/1982	San Nicolás de los Arroyos, Argentina	
Win	26-7-5	(Argentina) Abel Celestino Bailone	PTS	10	10/04/1982	Buenos Aires, Argentina	
Win	2-8-5	(Argentina) Jesus Eugenio Ibanez	TKO	8	12/03/1982	Pergamino, Argentina	
Win	7-3-1	(Argentina) Angel Gustavo Salinas	PTS	10	20/02/1982	Buenos Aires, Argentina	
Win	7-2-1	(Argentina) Angel Gustavo Salinas	PTS	10	18/12/1981	Montevideo, Uruguay	
Win	24-11-7	(Argentina) Norberto Rufino Cabrera	PTS	10	20/11/1981	Montevideo, Uruguay	
Win	7-4-7	(Argentina) Juan Carlos Fernández	KO	6	06/11/1981	Pergamino, Argentina	
Win	2-7-5	(Argentina) Jesus Eugenio Ibanez	PTS	10	04/09/1981	Montevideo, Uruguay	
Win	0-5	(Paraguay) Jorge Servin	TKO	5	08/08/1981	San Miguel, Argentina	
Loss	32-1-1	(Argentina) Juan Roldán	TKO	3	13/06/1981	Buenos Aires, Argentina	
Win	2-4	(Argentina) Juan Alberto Ibanez	PTS	10	29/05/1981	San Miguel de Tucumán, Argentina	
Win	2-16-3	(Argentina) Natalio Ibarra	KO	6	15/05/1981	Pergamino, Argentina	
Win	23-3-6	(Argentina) Ruben Hector Pardo	PTS	12	25/04/1981	Buenos Aires, Argentina	South American Middleweight Title.
Win	22-10-2	(Argentina) Jose Luis Duran	TKO	9	24/04/1981	Pergamino, Argentina	
Win	32-8-7	(Argentina) Pedro Cesar Duarte	PTS	10	13/03/1981	San Miguel de Tucumán, Argentina	
Win	29-36-7	(Argentina) Obdulio Rogelio Zarza	PTS	10	19/12/1980	Tapiales, Argentina	
Win	0-4	(Chile) Manuel Flores	TKO	2	10/10/1980	Pergamino, Argentina	
Win	4-9-2	(Argentina) Hugo Belisario Salega	RTD	3	12/09/1980	San Miguel, Argentina	
Win	0-2	(Brazil) Crispin de Oliveira	TKO	6	14/06/1980	Pergamino, Argentina	
Win	28-32-7	(Argentina) Obdulio Rogelio Zarza	PTS	10	24/05/1980	Concordia, Argentina	
Win	2-7	(Argentina) Roberto Troilo Ortiz	KO	2	10/05/1980	Los Toldos, Argentina	
Win	2-4-4	(Argentina) Aldo Carmona	RTD	8	24/04/1980	Pergamino, Argentina	
Loss	25-27-7	(Argentina) Obdulio Rogelio Zarza	TKO	9	02/11/1979	Concordia, Argentina	
Win	4-28-11	(Argentina) Alberto Juan Almiron	PTS	10	05/10/1979	San Miguel, Argentina	
Win	1-7-2	(Argentina) Antonio Lopez	RTD	10	31/08/1979	Rosario, Argentina	
Draw	23-27-6	(Argentina) Obdulio Rogelio Zarza	PTS	10	10/08/1979	Salta, Argentina	
Loss	16-3-6	(Argentina) Jose Alberto Vega	PTS	10	13/07/1979	Rosario, Argentina	
Loss	13-1-2	(Argentina) Ruben Hector Pardo	TKO	4	12/01/1979	Mar del Plata, Argentina	South American Middleweight Title.
Draw	8-23-5	(Argentina) Hugo Estefano Obregon	PTS	10	25/11/1978	Olavarría, Argentina	
Win	3-4-2	(Argentina) Oscar Aguero	KO	8	13/10/1978	Azul, Argentina	
Win	4-20-9	(Argentina) Alberto Juan Almiron	PTS	10	23/09/1978	Salta, Argentina	
Draw	13-2-3	(Argentina) Jose Alberto Vega	PTS	10	08/09/1978	Pergamino, Argentina	
Win	28-4	(Peru) Marcelo Quiñones	PTS	12	12/08/1978	Montevideo, Uruguay	South American Middleweight Title.
Win	12-20-4	(Argentina) Roque Ignacio Roldan	PTS	10	07/07/1978	Pergamino, Argentina	
Win	10-0-2	(Argentina) Ruben Hector Pardo	PTS	10	27/05/1978	Buenos Aires, Argentina	
Win	4-18-9	(Argentina) Alberto Juan Almiron	TD	7	05/05/1978	Pergamino, Argentina	
Loss	7-3-1	(Argentina) Ricardo Arce	PTS	10	06/04/1978	Posadas, Argentina	
Loss	18-4-3	(Argentina) Pedro Cesar Duarte	PTS	10	03/03/1978	San Luis, Córdoba, Argentina	
Win	18-20-6	(Argentina) Obdulio Rogelio Zarza	PTS	10	30/01/1978	Azul, Argentina	
Win	18-2-3	(Argentina) Pedro Cesar Duarte	PTS	10	23/12/1977	Pergamino, Argentina	
Win	12-16-4	(Argentina) Roque Ignacio Roldan	PTS	10	11/11/1977	Pergamino, Argentina	
Win	4-14-9	(Argentina) Alberto Juan Almiron	PTS	10	22/10/1977	Buenos Aires, Argentina	
Win	17-1-3	(Argentina) Pedro Cesar Duarte	KO	10	01/10/1977	Buenos Aires, Argentina	
Win	0-3-2	(Argentina) Antonio Lopez	TKO	8	16/09/1977	Pergamino, Argentina	
Win	24-15-8	(Argentina) Rodolfo Rosales	PTS	10	29/08/1977	Buenos Aires, Argentina	
Win	4-3-3	(Argentina) Camilo Gaitan	PTS	10	05/08/1977	Pergamino, Argentina	
Win	6-18-5	(Argentina) Hugo Estefano Obregon	PTS	10	09/07/1977	Pergamino, Argentina	
Win	24-12-3	(Argentina) Ramón Méndez	PTS	10	03/06/1977	Pergamino, Argentina	
Win	32-9-1	(Argentina) Hugo Inocencio Saavedra	TKO	2	20/05/1977	Córdoba, Argentina	
Draw	3-3-2	(Argentina) Camilo Gaitan	PTS	10	07/05/1977	Pergamino, Argentina	
Win	74-20-15	(Argentina) Esteban Alfredo Osuna	PTS	10	09/04/1977	Pergamino, Argentina	
Win	0-4	(Argentina) Raul Antonio Paez	RTD	4	10/03/1977	Pergamino, Argentina	
Win	0-3	(Argentina) Raul Antonio Paez	PTS	10	27/01/1977	Arrecifes, Argentina	
Win	2-9	(Argentina) Juan Carlos Artaza	PTS	10	17/12/1976	Pergamino, Argentina	
Win	6-14-3	(Argentina) Hugo Estefano Obregon	PTS	10	25/11/1976	Pergamino, Argentina	
Win	1-2-3	(Argentina) Segundo Miguel Pais	KO	6	05/11/1976	Pergamino, Argentina	
Draw	1-2-2	(Argentina) Segundo Miguel Pais	PTS	10	17/09/1976	Pergamino, Argentina	
Win	6-12-3	(Argentina) Hugo Estefano Obregon	PTS	10	03/09/1976	Pergamino, Argentina	
Win	3-6-7	(Argentina) Alberto Juan Almiron	PTS	10	07/08/1976	Pergamino, Argentina	
Win	5-8-2	(Argentina) Juan Jose Santos Paz	TKO	8	16/07/1976	Pergamino, Argentina	
Win	2-1	(Argentina) José Pintos	KO	3	18/06/1976	Pergamino, Argentina	
Win	9-12-5	(Argentina) Octavio Escaurriza	PTS	8	04/06/1976	Pergamino, Argentina	
Win	1-1	(Argentina) Victor Pereyra	TKO	3	24/05/1976	Pergamino, Argentina	
Win	2-0	(Argentina) Hector Rodolfo Altamirano	PTS	8	30/04/1976	Pergamino, Argentina	
Win	11-7-1	(Argentina) Gregorio Navarro	KO	3	12/03/1976	Pergamino, Argentina	
Win	3-3-1	(Argentina) Celso Laudino Sosa	TKO	3	20/02/1976	Pergamino, Argentina	
Win	1-0-1	(Argentina) Alejandro García	PTS	6	06/02/1976	Pergamino, Argentina	
