= Rodrigo Valdez =

Colombian boxer (1946–2017)

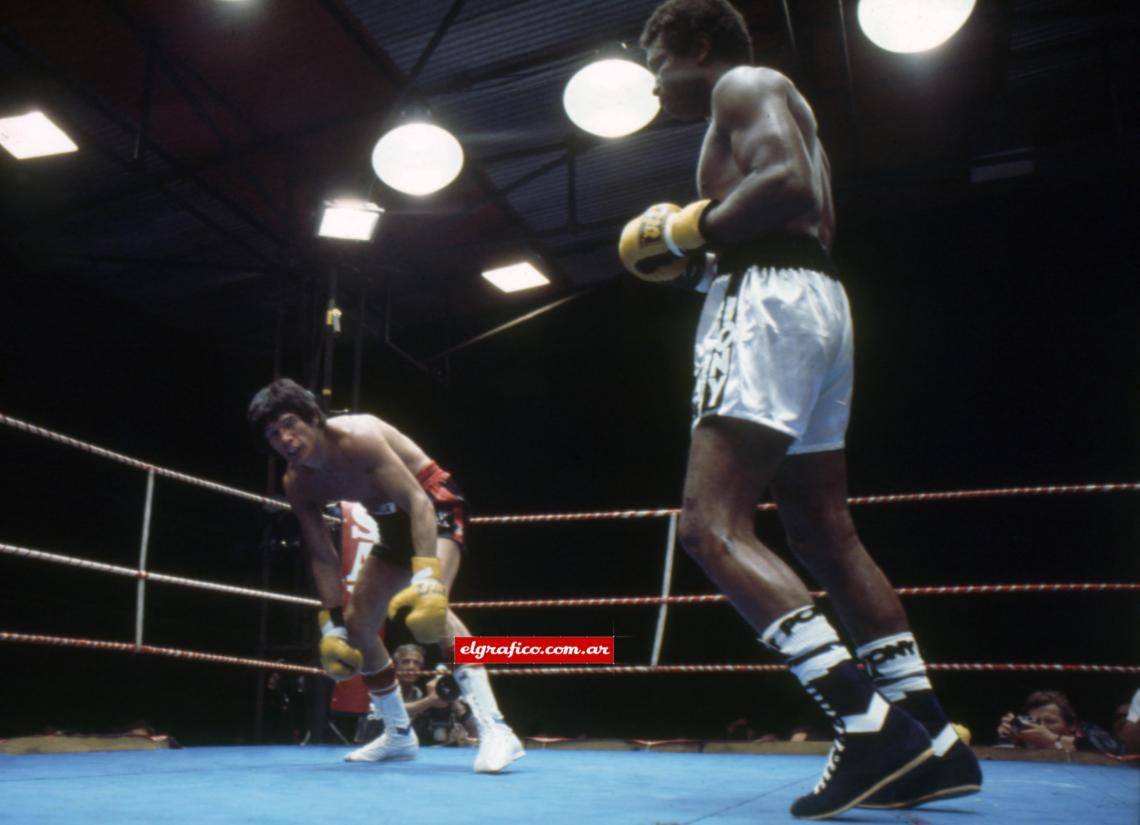

Personal information
- Nickname: Rocky
- Born: Rodrigo Valdez Hernández; February 22, 1946 Cartagena, Colombia
- Died: March 15, 2017 (aged 71) Cartagena, Colombia
- Height: 5 ft 8 in (173 cm)
- Weight: Middleweight

Boxing career
- Reach: 70 in (178 cm)
- Stance: Orthodox

Boxing record
- Total fights: 73
- Wins: 63
- Win by KO: 43
- Losses: 8
- Draws: 2

Rodrigo Valdez (February 22, 1946 – March 15, 2017) was a Colombian professional boxer who competed from 1963 to 1980. He was a two time middleweight champion, having held the WBC title from 1974 to 1976 and the undisputed WBA, WBC, and The Ring titles from 1977 to 1978. His rivalry with Carlos Monzón has long been considered among the most legendary boxing rivalries. Valdez was trained by hall of famer coach Gil Clancy. Many people consider him, Antonio Cervantes and Miguel "Happy" Lora to be the three greatest boxers ever to come from that country. He is 29th on Ring Magazine's list of 100 greatest punchers of all time. Valdez was inducted into the International Boxing Hall of Fame batch 2025.

== Professional boxing career ==
Born in Bolívar, Colombia, Rodrigo Valdez began his professional boxing career with a win over Orlando Pineda in a four-round decision on October 25, 1963, at Cartagena. He won his next eight bouts, but on October 2, 1965, he lost his undefeated record, beaten by knockout in six by Rudy Escobar.

After that defeat, he went on another undefeated streak of fifteen fights, of which he won thirteen and tied two. However, on his first fight abroad, February 16, 1969, in Ecuador, he lost a ten-round decision to Daniel Guanin. After one more fight in Cartagena, he moved to the United States. Trying to gain more recognition, he campaigned, from 1969 to 1970, in the states of New York, Nevada and California, winning seven fights and losing two. Then, he returned to South America for four more fights in his homeland, winning all.

=== Hepatitis ===
In his next match, held at the Madison Square Garden in New York City, with Bobby Cassidy on August 9, 1971, Valdez won by knockout in round six, because the fight doctor deemed Cassidy not fit to continue from a cut around his eye which had been ruled as produced by a Valdez punch. At the time, nobody knew that Cassidy had hepatitis A. As a consequence of this, Valdez also became affected by the disease. Given a quarantine, he refused to quit boxing periodically and continued training during his time of illness. Separated from most of the world, he was fit enough to win two more fights within three months of his initial diagnosis of hepatitis.

Valdez had nineteen wins in a row when he met Philadelphia legend Bennie Briscoe for the NABF middleweight title, in Nouméa, New Caledonia, on September 1, 1973, beating Briscoe in a 12-round decision to capture the regional championship and becoming a world-ranked middleweight contender. After this win, Valdez claimed for a world title shot at Monzon.

=== World title ===
He won two more fights, and the WBC made him its number one contender at Monzon's title. But Monzon did not feel like fighting the Colombian at that moment, so the WBC stripped Monzon of the world title (Monzon retained the WBA title) and made Valdez and Briscoe rematch, this time with the WBC world middleweight title on the line. On May 25, 1974, at Monte Carlo, Valdez became a world champion for the first time, by knocking Briscoe out in seven rounds. Valdez subsequently retained his title against Rudy Valdez, Gratien Tonna, and Max Cohen, until Monzon finally agreed to meet him.

One week before the long-awaited match-up, on June 19, 1976, Valdez's brother was murdered during a barroom fight in Colombia. Already in Monte Carlo for the fight, Valdez wanted to pull out of it to join his family in mourning. But he was contractually bound to fight Monzon, so he had to stay in Europe, and on June 26, Valdez, who to many observers seemed rather uninterested, lost in the unification bout to Monzon in a 15-round unanimous decision. Valdez won two more fights after returning to Colombia.

The WBA and WBC, recognizing that Valdez probably wasn't in the best of moods to fight during his first confrontation with Monzon, ordered a second fight between the rivals, and so they fought again, on July 30, 1977, once again at Monte Carlo. This time around, Valdez knocked down Monzon in the second round, becoming the only man to send the Argentine to the floor in Monzon's long career. Valdez was leading after seven rounds, but Monzon mounted a late rally that allowed him to keep the title by a close decision.

=== Monzon's retirement ===
Monzon announced his retirement from boxing afterwards, and so Valdez and Briscoe were matched once again, on November 5, 1977, for the vacant undisputed world middleweight championship, in Campione d'Italia, which belonged back then not to Italy, but actually to Switzerland. Valdez recovered the world middleweight championship, with a 15-round decision over Briscoe. This time around, however, he would lose his title on his first defense, on April 22, 1978, by points in 15 rounds to another Argentine, Hugo Corro, in San Remo, Italy.

On November 11 of that same year, they had a rematch, at Buenos Aires' Luna Park Stadium, and Corro repeated his 15-round victory to retain the world title.

== Retirement ==
Valdez fought only twice more, winning both fights by knockout. After beating Gilberto Amonte on November 28, 1980, in the first round, he retired from boxing for good.

Valdez had a record of 63 wins, eight losses and two draws as a professional boxer, with 42 wins by knockout.

== Death ==
According to Colombian sources, Valdez died of a massive heart attack on March 14, 2017. Cartagena mayor Manuel Duque confirmed the two time former world champion's death, calling him "one of the greatest Colombian sportsmen of all time".

== Professional boxing record ==
73 fights	63 wins	8 losses
By knockout	43	1
By decision	20	7
Draws	2	

No.	Result	Record	Opponent	Type	Round, time	Date	Location	Notes
73	Win	63–8–2	Gilberto Almonte	TKO	1 (10), 1:41	Nov 28, 1980	Coliseo El Campin, Bogotá, Colombia	
72	Win	62–8–2	Charles Hayward	TKO	7 (10), 1:25	May 14, 1980	Coliseo El Campin, Bogotá, Colombia	
71	Loss	61–8–2	Hugo Corro	UD	15	Nov 11, 1978	Estadio Luna Park, Buenos Aires, Argentina	For WBA, WBC, and The Ring middleweight titles
70	Win	61–7–2	Mayfield Pennington	TKO	7 (10), 1:22	Sep 30, 1978	Coliseo El Campin, Bogotá, Colombia	
69	Loss	60–7–2	Hugo Corro	UD	15	Apr 22, 1978	Teatro Ariston, Sanremo, Liguria, Italy	Lost WBA, WBC, and The Ring middleweight titles
68	Win	60–6–2	Bennie Briscoe	UD	15	Nov 5, 1977	Casinò di Campione, Campione d'Italia, Lombardy, Italy	Won vacant WBA, WBC, and The Ring middleweight titles
67	Loss	59–6–2	Carlos Monzón	UD	15	Jul 30, 1977	Stade Louis II, Fontvieille, Monaco	For WBA, WBC, and The Ring middleweight titles
66	Win	59–5–2	Oreste Lebron	TKO	5 (10)	Mar 19, 1977	Coliseo Humberto Perea, Barranquilla, Atlántico, Colombia	
65	Win	58–5–2	Ramon Beras	KO	7 (10)	Oct 24, 1976	Cartagena, Bolívar, Colombia	
64	Loss	57–5–2	Carlos Monzón	UD	15	Jun 26, 1976	Stade Louis II, Fontvieille, Monaco	Lost WBC middleweight title; For WBA and The Ring middleweight titles
63	Win	57–4–2	Nessim Max Cohen	TKO	4 (15), 2:45	Mar 28, 1976	Pavillon de Paris, Paris, Île-de-France, France	Retained WBC middleweight title
62	Win	56–4–2	Rudy Robles	UD	15	Aug 16, 1975	Plaza de Toros de Cartagena de Indias, Cartagena, Bolívar, Colombia	Retained WBC middleweight title
61	Win	55–4–2	Ramón Mendez	TKO	8 (15)	May 31, 1975	Coliseo El Pueblo, Cali, Valle del Cauca, Colombia	Retained WBC middleweight title
60	Win	54–4–2	Gratien Tonna	KO	11 (15)	Nov 30, 1974	Palais des Expositions, Paris, Île-de-France, France	Retained WBC middleweight title
59	Win	53–4–2	Vinnie Curto	UD	10	Oct 25, 1974	Madison Square Garden, New York City, New York, U.S.	
58	Win	52–4–2	Cubby Jackson	TKO	2 (12)	Sep 6, 1974	Coliseo El Campin, Bogotá, Colombia	
57	Win	51–4–2	Bennie Briscoe	TKO	7 (15), 2:55	May 25, 1974	Stade Louis II, Fontvieille, Monaco	Won vacant WBC middleweight title
56	Win	50–4–2	Ernie Burns	KO	2 (10)	Mar 16, 1974	Plaza de Toros de Cartagena de Indias, Cartagena, Bolívar, Colombia	
55	Win	49–4–2	Joey Durelle	KO	2 (10)	Dec 14, 1973	Coliseo El Campin, Bogotá, Colombia	
54	Win	48–4–2	Bennie Briscoe	UD	12	Sep 1, 1973	Omnisports Stadium, Nouméa, South Province, New Caledonia	Won NABF middleweight title
53	Win	47–4–2	Antonio Aguilar	PTS	10	Jul 19, 1973	Coliseo El Campin, Bogotá, Colombia	
52	Win	46–4–2	Leon Washington	KO	7 (10)	May 30, 1973	Coliseo El Campin, Bogotá, Colombia	
51	Win	45–4–2	Kim Booker	TKO	5 (10), 2:12	Apr 16, 1973	Felt Forum, New York City, New York, U.S.	
50	Win	44–4–2	José Rodríguez	TKO	5 (10)	Mar 5, 1973	Felt Forum, New York City, New York, U.S.	
49	Win	43–4–2	Carlos Marks	PTS	10	Dec 18, 1972	Parc des Expositions, Paris, Île-de-France, France	
48	Win	42–4–2	Lloyd Duncan	UD	10	Sep 29, 1972	Sunnyside Gardens, New York City, New York, U.S.	
47	Win	41–4–2	Roy Edmonds	KO	2 (10), 1:11	Aug 28, 1972	Madison Square Garden, New York City, New York, U.S.	
46	Win	40–4–2	Juan Evangelista Córdoba	KO	6 (?)	Aug 10, 1972	Barranquilla, Atlántico, Colombia	
45	Win	39–4–2	Milton Mendez	KO	2 (?)	Apr 2, 1972	Valledupar, Cesar, Colombia	
44	Win	38–4–2	Thurman Doc Holliday	TKO	4 (10), 2:38	Nov 25, 1971	Sunnyside Gardens, New York City, New York, U.S.	Fought while quarantined with Hepatitis
43	Win	37–4–2	Perry Abney	TKO	1 (10), 2:59	Oct 19, 1971	Felt Forum, New York City, New York, U.S.	Fought while quarantined with Hepatitis
42	Win	36–4–2	Bobby Cassidy	TKO	7 (10), 0:44	Aug 9, 1971	Madison Square Garden, New York City, New York, U.S.	Cassidy did not know he had Hepatitis, Valdez later developed the disease
41	Win	35–4–2	Edmundo Leite	TKO	4 (10)	Jun 28, 1971	Felt Forum, New York City, New York, U.S.	
40	Win	34–4–2	Marcos Tordoya	TKO	4 (10)	May 14, 1971	Coliseo Humberto Perea, Barranquilla, Atlántico, Colombia	
39	Win	33–4–2	Arturo Lang	KO	5 (10), 2:59	Mar 26, 1971	Barranquilla, Atlántico, Colombia	
38	Win	32–4–2	Juan Jimenez	KO	2 (10)	Jan 24, 1971	Estadio 11 de Noviembre, Cartagena, Bolívar, Colombia	
37	Win	31–4–2	Juan Evangelista Córdoba	TKO	9 (10)	Jul 31, 1970	Atanasio Girardot Coliseum, Medellín, Antioquia, Colombia	
36	Loss	30–4–2	Ralph Palladin	SD	10	May 11, 1970	Madison Square Garden, New York City, New York, U.S.	
35	Win	30–3–2	Cassius Greene	UD	10	May 1, 1970	Sunnyside Gardens, New York City, New York, U.S.	
34	Loss	29–3–2	Pete Toro	MD	10	Mar 2, 1970	Madison Square Garden, New York City, New York, U.S.	
33	Win	29–2–2	Dave Oropeza	KO	1 (10), 1:29	Feb 14, 1970	The Forum, Inglewood, California, U.S.	
32	Win	28–2–2	Denny Stiletto	TKO	1 (10)	Dec 10, 1969	Silver Slipper, Paradise, Nevada, U.S.	
31	Win	27–2–2	Raul Rodríguez	TKO	9 (10)	Oct 17, 1969	The Forum, Inglewood, California, U.S.	
30	Win	26–2–2	David Melendez	TKO	5 (10), 2:08	Sep 17, 1969	Felt Forum, New York City, New York, U.S.	
29	Win	25–2–2	Mike DeFeo	TKO	1 (10), 1:27	Sep 3, 1969	Silver Slipper, Paradise, Nevada, U.S.	
28	Win	24–2–2	Peter Cobblah	UD	10	Aug 6, 1969	Silver Slipper, Paradise, Nevada, U.S.	
27	Win	23–2–2	Linfer Contreras	KO	2 (?)	Jun 4, 1969	Teatro Circo, Cartagena, Bolívar, Colombia	
26	Loss	22–2–2	Daniel Guanin	PTS	10	Feb 16, 1969	Quito, Pichincha, Ecuador	
25	Win	22–1–2	Humberto Trottman	PTS	10	Aug 6, 1968	Bogotá, Colombia	
24	Win	21–1–2	Cartagenita Kid	KO	7 (?)	Apr 15, 1968	Cartagena, Bolívar, Colombia	
23	Draw	20–1–2	German Gastelbondo	PTS	10	Jan 21, 1968	Estadio 11 de Noviembre, Cartagena, Bolívar, Colombia	
22	Win	20–1–1	Richard Morales	KO	2 (?)	Dec 3, 1967	Coliseo Cubierto de Monteria, Monteria, Bolívar, Colombia	
21	Win	19–1–1	Humberto Trottman	PTS	10	Oct 1, 1967	Estadio 11 de Noviembre, Cartagena, Bolívar, Colombia	
20	Win	18–1–1	Alfonso Franco	KO	12 (12)	Aug 20, 1967	Estadio 11 de Noviembre, Cartagena, Bolívar, Colombia	
19	Win	17–1–1	Baby Mendez	KO	3 (?)	Aug 12, 1967	El Carmen, Colombia	
18	Win	16–1–1	Kid Revolledo	PTS	10	Jun 10, 1967	Sincelejo, Sucre, Colombia	
17	Draw	15–1–1	Mario Rossito	PTS	10	Apr 2, 1967	Estadio 11 de Noviembre, Cartagena, Bolívar, Colombia	
16	Win	15–1	Eugenio Espinoza	UD	10	Mar 5, 1967	Estadio 11 de Noviembre, Cartagena, Bolívar, Colombia	
15	Win	14–1	Julio Novella	TKO	2 (10)	Jan 22, 1967	Estadio 11 de Noviembre, Cartagena, Bolívar, Colombia	
14	Win	13–1	Alfonso Franco	KO	7 (12)	Nov 4, 1966	Estadio 11 de Noviembre, Cartagena, Bolívar, Colombia	
13	Win	12–1	Elias Lian	PTS	10	Jul 29, 1966	Estadio 11 de Noviembre, Cartagena, Bolívar, Colombia	
12	Win	11–1	Luis Ascary Lucero	KO	2 (10)	Jun 24, 1966	Estadio 11 de Noviembre, Cartagena, Bolívar, Colombia	
11	Win	10–1	Sixto Ulloa	PTS	10	Apr 29, 1966	Estadio 11 de Noviembre, Cartagena, Bolívar, Colombia	
10	Win	9–1	Rafael Luna	UD	10	Mar 13, 1966	Estadio 11 de Noviembre, Cartagena, Bolívar, Colombia	
9	Loss	8–1	Juan Escobar	TKO	6 (10), 3:00	Oct 2, 1965	Coliseo Humberto Perea, Barranquilla, Atlántico, Colombia	
8	Win	8–0	Elias Hidalgo	KO	6 (?)	Jul 9, 1965	Coliseo Humberto Perea, Barranquilla, Atlántico, Colombia	
7	Win	7–0	Manuel Jack Hernandez	PTS	10	Sep 12, 1964	Barranquilla, Atlántico, Colombia	
6	Win	6–0	Fernando Alvarez	TKO	8 (10)	May 15, 1964	Coliseo Humberto Perea, Barranquilla, Atlántico, Colombia	
5	Win	5–0	Alejandro Parra	PTS	8	Feb 28, 1964	Barranquilla, Atlántico, Colombia	
4	Win	4–0	Humberto Hurtado	PTS	6	Feb 6, 1964	Plaza de Toros de la Serrezuela, Cartagena, Bolívar, Colombia	
3	Win	3–0	Alejandro Parra	KO	5 (?)	Jan 15, 1964	Cartagena, Bolívar, Colombia	
2	Win	2–0	Eliecer de Avila	KO	4 (?)	Nov 6, 1963	Teatro Circo, Cartagena, Bolívar, Colombia	
1	Win	1–0	Orlando Pineda	PTS	4	Oct 25, 1963	Estadio Once de Noviembre, Cartagena, Bolívar, Colombia	

== Titles in boxing ==
=== Major world titles ===
- WBA middleweight champion (160 lbs)
- WBC middleweight champion (160 lbs) (2×)

=== The Ring magazine titles ===
- The Ring middleweight champion (160 lbs)

=== Regional/International titles ===
- NABF middleweight champion (160 lbs)

=== Undisputed titles ===
- Undisputed middleweight champion

== See also ==
- Afro-Colombians
- WBC Legends of Boxing Museum
- List of world middleweight boxing champions

Sporting positions
Regional boxing titles
Preceded by Bennie Briscoe	NABF middleweight champion September 1, 1973 – 1974; Vacated	Vacant Title next held by Tony Licata
World boxing titles
Vacant Title last held by Carlos Monzón	WBC middleweight champion May 25, 1974 – June 26, 1976	Succeeded by Carlos Monzón
Vacant Title last held by Carlos Monzón	WBA middleweight champion November 5, 1977 – April 22, 1978	Succeeded by Hugo Corro
Vacant Title last held by Carlos Monzón	WBC middleweight champion November 5, 1977 – April 22, 1978	Succeeded by Hugo Corro
Vacant Title last held by Carlos Monzón	The Ring middleweight champion November 5, 1977 – April 22, 1978	Succeeded by Hugo Corro
Vacant Title last held by Carlos Monzón	Undisputed middleweight champion November 5, 1977 – April 22, 1978	Succeeded by Hugo Corro
