= Juan Roldán =

Argentine boxer (1957–2020)

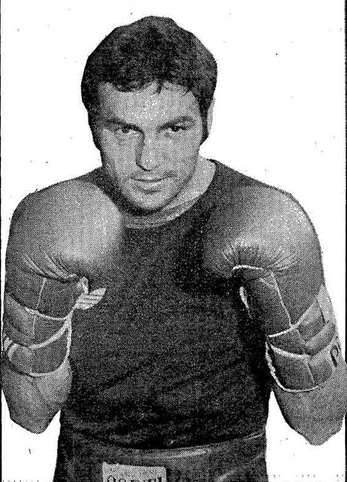

Personal information
- Nickname: Martillo
- Born: Juan Domingo Roldán; March 6, 1957 Freyre, Córdoba, Argentina
- Died: November 18, 2020 (aged 63) San Francisco, Córdoba, Argentina
- Height: 5 ft 8 in (1.73 m)
- Weight: Middleweight

Boxing career
- Stance: Orthodox

Boxing record
- Total fights: 75
- Wins: 67
- Win by KO: 47
- Losses: 5
- Draws: 2

Juan Domingo Roldán (6 March 1957 – 18 November 2020) was an Argentine professional boxer, best remembered for his strong showing in the early rounds of an undisputed world championship bout against Marvelous Marvin Hagler. After flooring Hagler in the opening seconds Roldan was able to further enjoy success against the dominant middleweight champion. Hagler significantly injured Roldán's eye with the thumb of his glove. Roldán fought on, but was unable to continue and suffered a technical knockout. He retired for a couple of years before coming back with a campaign that took him to another middleweight world title bout, this time with Thomas Hearns. In an exciting contest, Roldán shook Hearns early, but succumbed to a Hearns attack in the fourth. A final world middleweight title fight with Michael Nunn resulted in a loss by KO, following which Roldán ended his professional boxing career. Nicknamed Martillo (Hammer) Roldán often featured on Ring En Español magazine.

== Career ==
Roldán made his professional debut on December 8, 1978 in San Francisco, Argentina, defeating Jorge Servin via first-round knockout. His first four wins all came by first round knockouts. On May 11, 1979, Roldán went the distance for the first time when rival Hugo Obregón went ten rounds with him. Roldán won the fight on points. On September 21, 1979, he suffered the first defeat of his career to Juan Carlos Borgado, losing a ten-round decision.

Out of his next eighteen bouts, he won seventeen and drew (tied) once. He then challenged Jacinto Fernández on March 13, 1981, for the Argentine Middleweight title, winning a twelve-round decision. In his next fight, he beat José María Flores Burlón, a boxer who would later challenge Carlos De León for the world's Cruiserweight title. Roldán won six more fights and drew one before challenging José Maria's brother, Carlos Flores Burlón for the South American Middleweight title, on February 12, 1982. He won the title with a second-round knockout.

Before 1982 was over, he retained his Argentine Middleweight title with a first-round knockout of Marcos Perez, but losing on a disqualification in three rounds to Ricardo Arce. In an immediate rematch, Roldán put his Argentine title on the line and this time, he avenged his defeat to Arce with a second-round knockout win. After five more wins in a row, he fought Juan Carlos Peralta, with the fight resulting in a three-round no contest.

On May 27, 1983, Roldán made his international debut, with a 10-round decision over Teddy Mann in Rhode Island, United States. After retaining his Argentine title twice more, he was faced, on November 10, 1983, with one of the top rated Middleweights of the time, Frank 'The Animal' Fletcher, at the undercard of the high-profile, Marvin Hagler vs. Roberto Durán world title fight in Las Vegas. Roldán dropped Fletcher twice on his way to a sixth-round knockout victory.

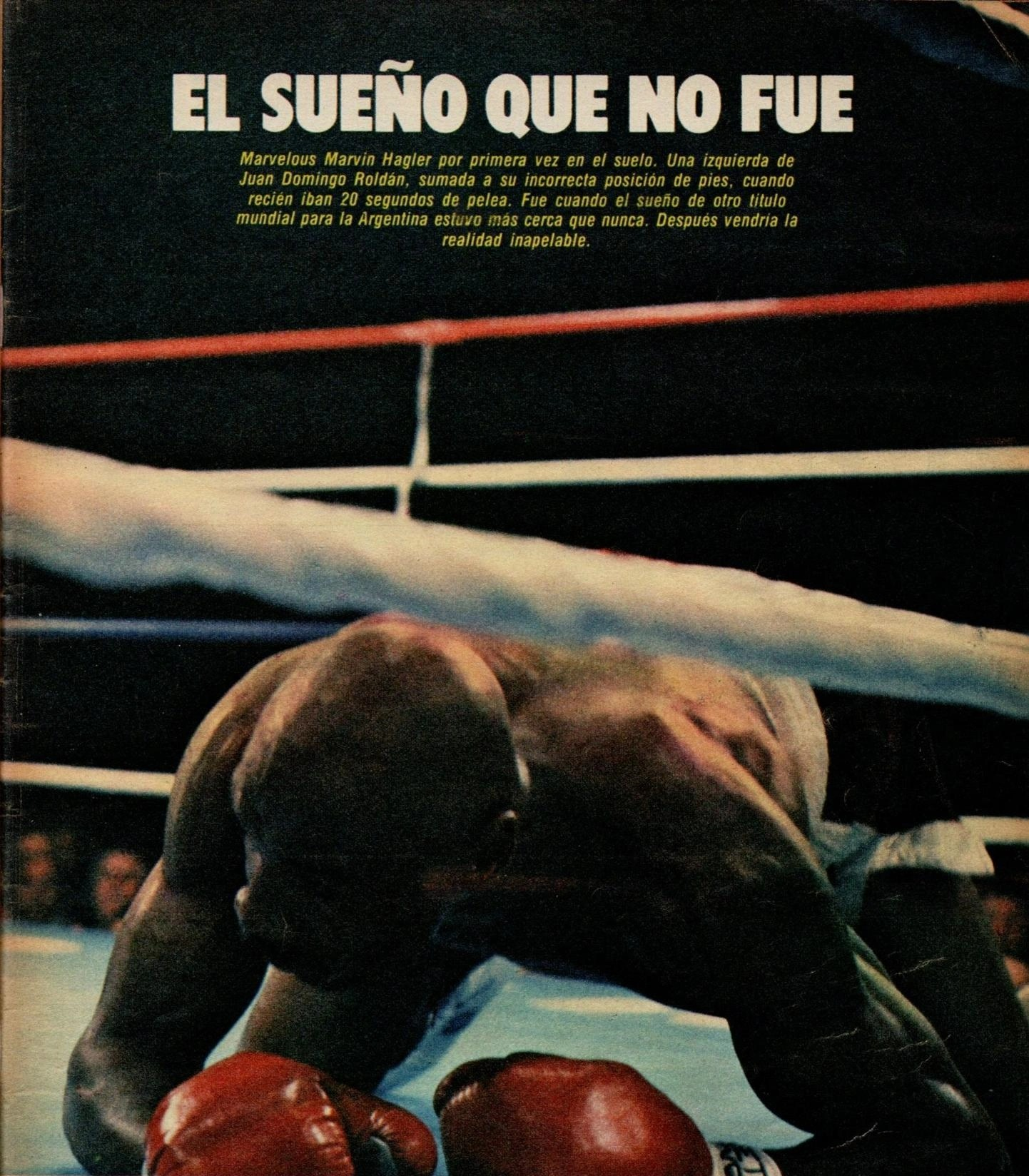
Hagler on the ground in the first round of his fight against Roldán

After this win, Roldán was ranked number 1 by the major boxing organizations, and he accordingly met Hagler for the undisputed world middleweight title on March 30, 1984. Seconds into round one, the quick starting Roldán became the first and only boxer to score an official knockdown against Hagler, who though not hurt was disconcerted. In round three, Hagler was credited with a knockdown which was also dubious, after Roldán had got his feet tangled with the ring's ropes.

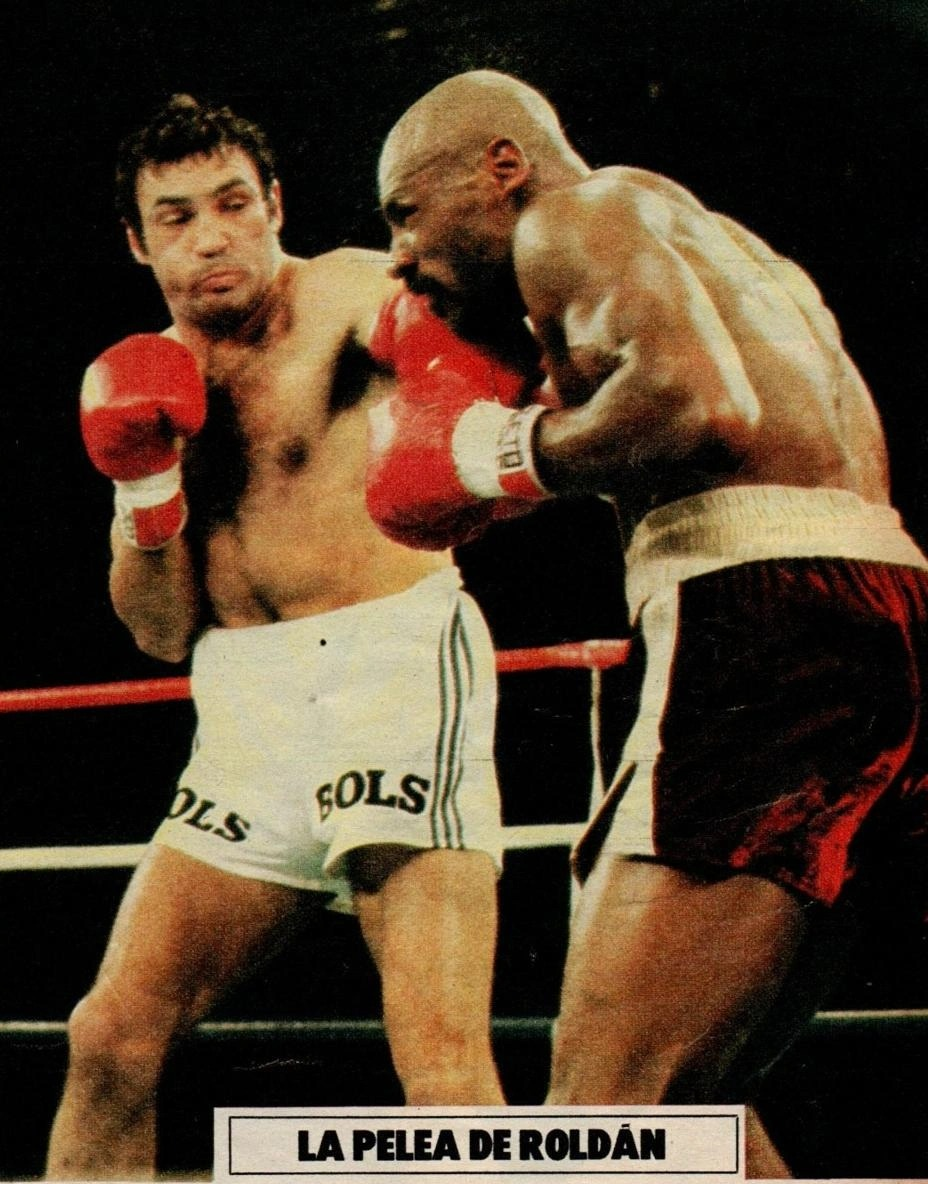

Roldán showed less recklessness than previously in this contest, and utilizing his innate hand speed and a style difficult for southpaws to defend against, he landed scoring punches for the next few rounds while pressing the action. Though not rocking Hagler, they were considered surprising by commentators in view of his skills and Roldán's crude technique. However, by the middle of the bout, Hagler was winning every exchange. After being floored in the tenth, a swollen and cut Roldán quit, giving Hagler a win by technical knockout. The October after this bruising loss, Roldán announced his retirement. His knockdown of Hagler signaled the beginning of a renowned champion's decline, but none of the diminished Hagler's subsequent opponents were able to duplicate Roldán's feat which remained unique.

In 1986, Roldán reconsidered his decision and made a comeback. He won thirteen bouts in a row, including one over James Kinchen, before he challenged for a world title again. On October 29, 1987, at Las Vegas, Thomas Hearns became the first boxer to win world titles in four different divisions when he beat Roldán in four rounds by knockout, but not before Roldán had Hearns in trouble in rounds three and four.

On September 16, 1988, Roldán beat former world Middleweight champion Hugo Corro via first-round knockout in Mar del Plata, securing a third world title shot, against Michael Nunn on November 4 of that year. Roldán lost what turned out to be his last fight, by a knockout in round eight. Roldán retired with a record of 67 wins, 5 losses, 2 draws and one no contest, 47 of his wins being by knockout.

== Death ==
Roldán died on November 18, 2020, from COVID-19 during the COVID-19 pandemic in Argentina. He was 63.

== Professional boxing record ==
67 Wins (47 knockouts, 20 decisions), 5 Losses (4 knockouts, 1 decision), 2 Draws, 1 No Contest Archived 2015-04-06 at the Wayback Machine
Res.	Record	Opponent	Type	Round	Date	Location	Notes
Loss	67-2-5	(United States) Michael Nunn	KO	8	04/11/1988	(United States) Las Vegas, Nevada, U.S.	IBF Middleweight Title. Roldan knocked out at 2:28 of the eighth round.
Win	67-2-4	(Argentina) Hugo Pastor Corro	KO	1	16/09/1988	Buenos Aire, Argentina	
Win	66-2-4	(Argentina) Miguel Angel Maldonado	KO	6	19/08/1988	San Miguel de Tucuman, Argentina	
Loss	65-2-4	(United States) Thomas Hearns	KO	4	29/10/1987	(United States) Las Vegas, Nevada, U.S.	WBC Middleweight Title. Roldan knocked out at 2:01 of the fourth round.
Win	65-2-3	(Brazil) Clarismundo Aparecido Silva	KO	2	15/05/1987	Comodoro Rivadavia, Argentina	
Win	64-2-3	(United States) James "The Heat" Kinchen	TKO	9	06/04/1987	(United States) Las Vegas, Nevada, U.S.	Referee stopped the bout at 1:06 of the ninth round.
Win	63-2-3	(Colombia) Tomas Polo Ruiz	KO	4	06/02/1987	Rosario, Santa Fe, Argentina	
Win	62-2-3	(Argentina) Carlos Maria del Valle Herrera	KO	2	13/12/1986	Buenos Aire, Argentina	
Win	61-2-3	(United States) JB Williamson	PTS	10	18/10/1986	Buenos Aire, Argentina	
Win	60-2-3	(Paraguay) Juan Carlos Gimenez	PTS	10	13/09/1986	Buenos Aire, Argentina	
Win	59-2-3	(Argentina) Miguel Angel Maldonado	KO	2	29/08/1986	Rosario, Santa Fe, Argentina	
Win	58-2-3	(United States) Darryl Penn	KO	3	01/08/1986	San Francisco, Cordoba, Argentina	
Win	57-2-3	(Argentina) Eduardo Domingo Contreras	PTS	10	19/06/1986	Cordoba, Argentina	
Win	56-2-3	(Argentina) Jorge Juan Salgado	PTS	10	10/05/1986	Buenos Aire, Argentina	
Win	55-2-3	(Argentina) Angel Antonio Caro	KO	6	29/03/1986	Villa Angela, Argentina	
Win	54-2-3	(Argentina) Juan Carlos "The King" Fernandez	KO	2	14/02/1986	Ceres, Santa Fe, Argentina	
Win	53-2-3	(France) Andre Mongelema	PTS	8	14/07/1984	Monte Carlo, Monaco	
Loss	52-2-3	(United States) Marvelous Marvin Hagler	TKO	10	30/03/1984	(United States) Las Vegas, Nevada, U.S.	IBF/WBC/WBA Middleweight Titles. Referee stopped the bout at 0:39 of the tenth round.
Win	52-2-2	(United States) Frank "The Animal" Fletcher	KO	6	10/11/1983	(United States) Las Vegas, Nevada, U.S.	Fletcher knocked out at 2:58 of the sixth round.
Win	51-2-2	(Argentina) Eduardo Domingo Contreras	PTS	10	16/09/1983	San Francisco, Cordoba, Argentina	
Win	50-2-2	(Argentina) Roberto Justino Ruiz	KO	8	06/08/1983	Buenos Aire, Argentina	FAB Argentina Middleweight Title
Win	49-2-2	(United States) Teddy Mann	UD	10	27/05/1983	(United States) Providence, Rhode Island, U.S.	
Win	48-2-2	(United States) Wilbur Henderson	KO	7	11/02/1983	(United States) Worcester, Massachusetts, Argentina	
No Contest	47-2-2	(Argentina) Juan Carlos Peralta	NC	3	14/01/1983	Trebol, Santa Fe, Argentina	
Win	47-2-2	(Argentina) Jose Alberto Vega	KO	2	10/12/1982	Cordoba, Argentina	
Win	46-2-2	(Guyana) Reggie Ford	KO	1	30/10/1982	Sanremo, Italy	Ford knocked out at 1:48 of the first round.
Win	45-2-2	(Argentina) Juan Carlos Peralta	PTS	10	08/10/1982	San Francisco, Cordoba, Argentina	
Win	44-2-2	(Argentina) Jacinto Horacio Fernandez	KO	2	11/09/1982	Buenos Aire, Argentina	FAB Argentina Middleweight Title
Win	43-2-2	(Argentina) Obdulio Rogelio Zarza	RTD	6	13/08/1982	Corrientes, Argentina	
Win	42-2-2	(Argentina) Ricardo Arce	KO	2	10/07/1982	Buenos Aire, Argentina	FAB Argentina Middleweight Title
Loss	41-2-2	(Argentina) Ricardo Arce	DQ	3	08/05/1982	Buenos Aire, Argentina	
Win	41-2-1	(Argentina) Marcos Perez	KO	1	16/04/1982	Corrientes, Argentina	FAB Argentina Middleweight Title
Win	40-2-1	(United States) "Sugar" Ray Phillips	KO	1	06/03/1982	Buenos Aire, Argentina	
Win	39-2-1	(Uruguay) Carlos Flores Burlon	KO	2	12/02/1982	Pergamino, Buenos Aires Province, Argentina	South American Middleweight Title
Win	38-2-1	(Argentina) Juan Carlos Peralta	PTS	10	22/01/1982	Morteros, Argentina	
Draw	37-2-1	(Argentina) Jacinto Horacio Fernandez	PTS	10	10/10/1981	Buenos Aire, Argentina	
Win	37-1-1	(Argentina) Julio Cesar Arancibia	KO	2	11/09/1981	San Miguel de Tucuman, Argentina	
Win	36-1-1	(Chile) Ricardo Molina Ortiz	KO	5	24/07/1981	San Miguel de Tucuman, Argentina	
Win	35-1-1	(Argentina) Jose Alberto Vega	KO	1	10/07/1981	San Francisco, Cordoba, Argentina	
Win	34-1-1	(Argentina) Obdulio Rogelio Zarza	PTS	10	26/06/1981	San Salvador de Jujuy, Argentina	
Win	33-1-1	(Argentina) Jose Maria Flores Burlon	TKO	3	13/06/1981	Buenos Aire, Argentina	
Win	32-1-1	(Argentina) Jacinto Horacio Fernandez	PTS	12	13/03/1981	San Francisco, Cordoba, Argentina	FAB Argentina Middleweight Title
Win	31-1-1	Manuel Navarro	KO	6	13/02/1981	Mar del Plata, Argentina	
Win	30-1-1	(Argentina) Marcos Perez	PTS	10	16/01/1981	Villa Carlos Paz, Argentina	
Draw	29-1-1	(Argentina) Juan Carlos Peralta	PTS	12	19/12/1980	Cordoba, Argentina	Cordoba Middleweight Title
Win	29-0-1	(Argentina) Jose Luis Duran	KO	6	05/12/1980	San Francisco, Cordoba, Argentina	
Win	28-0-1	(Argentina) Enrique Coronel	KO	7	21/11/1980	Salta, Argentina	
Win	27-0-1	(Argentina) Ramon Perez	PTS	12	07/11/1980	Cordoba, Argentina	
Win	26-0-1	(Chile) Ricardo Molina Ortiz	PTS	10	03/10/1980	San Francisco, Cordoba, Argentina	
Win	25-0-1	(Argentina) Roberto Antonio Marziali	KO	1	22/08/1980	Las Varillas, Cordoba, Argentina	Cordoba Middleweight Title
Win	24-0-1	(Argentina) Obdulio Rogelio Zarza	PTS	10	08/07/1980	San Francisco, Cordoba, Argentina	
Win	23-0-1	(Argentina) Aldo Carmona	KO	3	27/06/1980	Salta, Argentina	
Win	22-0-1	(Argentina) Jorge Juan Salgado	KO	7	06/06/1980	San Francisco, Cordoba, Argentina	
Win	21-0-1	(Chile) Ricardo Molina Ortiz	PTS	10	16/05/1980	San Francisco, Cordoba, Argentina	
Win	20-0-1	(Argentina) Ramon Perez	KO	8	11/04/1980	San Francisco, Cordoba, Argentina	
Win	19-0-1	(Argentina) Alfredo B Cruz	KO	7	15/03/1980	Buenos Aire, Argentina	
Win	18-0-1	(Argentina) Marcos Perez	KO	6	22/02/1980	Cordoba, Argentina	
Win	17-0-1	(Argentina) Juan Carlos Bogado	PTS	10	08/02/1980	San Francisco, Cordoba, Argentina	
Win	16-0-1	(Argentina) Roberto Troilo Ortiz	KO	2	18/01/1980	San Francisco, Cordoba, Argentina	
Win	15-0-1	(Argentina) Alfredo B Cruz	RTD	8	22/12/1979	Buenos Aires, Argentina	
Loss	14-0-1	(Argentina) Juan Carlos Bogado	RTD	8	21/09/1979	Cordoba, Argentina	
Win	14-0-0	(Argentina) Natalio O Ibarra	TKO	4	07/09/1979	Freyre, Cordoba, Argentina	
Win	13-0-0	(Argentina) Alberto R Cardozo	KO	3	24/08/1979	Morteros, Argentina	
Win	12-0-0	(Argentina) Ramon Perez	PTS	12	10/08/1979	San Francisco, Cordoba, Argentina	
Win	11-0-0	(Argentina) Alberto Juan Almiron	RTD	5	20/07/1979	Cordoba, Argentina	
Win	10-0-0	(Argentina) Oscar "The Grouch" Perez	KO	2	29/06/1979	Rafaela, Argentina	
Win	9-0-0	(Argentina) Hugo D Estefano Obregon	RTD	11	08/06/1979	San Francisco, Cordoba, Argentina	Cordoba Middleweight Title
Win	8-0-0	(Argentina) Natalio O Ibarra	PTS	10	24/05/1979	Brickman, Cordoba, Argentina	
Win	7-0-0	(Argentina) Hugo D Estefano Obregon	PTS	10	11/05/1979	Cordoba, Argentina	
Win	6-0-0	(Argentina) Oscar Francisco Lopez	KO	4	20/04/1979	Sunchales, Santa Fe, Argentina	
Win	5-0-0	(Argentina) Luis Carcacha	RTD	3	06/04/1979	San Francisco, Cordoba, Argentina	
Win	4-0-0	(Argentina) Irineo Claudio Cabrera	KO	1	23/03/1979	Rafaela, Santa Fe, Argentina	
Win	3-0-0	(Argentina) Luis Alberto Gutierrez	KO	1	09/02/1979	San Francisco, Cordoba, Argentina	
Win	2-0-0	(Argentina) Juan Carlos Hauscarriaga	KO	1	26/01/1979	Las Varillas, Cordoba, Argentina	
Win	1-0-0	(Paraguay) Jorge Servin	KO	1	08/12/1978	San Francisco, Cordoba, Argentina	
