= Willie Monroe =

Willie Monroe may refer to:

- Willie Monroe (boxer, born 1946) (born 1946), American professional boxer
- Willie Monroe Jr. (born 1986), American professional boxer
