= Joey Archer =

American boxer (1938–2025)

Personal information
- Born: February 10, 1938 New York City, U.S.
- Died: April 25, 2025 (aged 87) Rensselaer, New York, U.S.
- Height: 5 ft 10 in (1.78 m)
- Weight: Middleweight

Boxing career
- Stance: Orthodox

Boxing record
- Total fights: 49
- Wins: 45
- Win by KO: 8
- Losses: 4

Joey Archer (February 10, 1938 – April 25, 2025) was an American boxer. He defeated Sugar Ray Robinson in Robinson's final fight in 1965 (by unanimous decision) and fought Hall of Fame boxers such as Emile Griffith and Dick Tiger.

== Professional boxing career ==
“Irish” Joey Archer began his career in 1956 at 18 years of age. He was a master boxer with excellent speed but lacked any semblance of power in his punches. Fighting mostly in various New York and Texas venues, he was a winner in his first 30 fights, with only 7 victories coming inside the distance. His most notable win was against the highly ranked Don Fullmer by a decision. This win earned Archer a date against tough Puerto Rican contender Jose “Monon” Gonzalez, who gave Archer his first defeat in a split decision.

Two months later Archer avenged the loss by beating Gonzalez in a decisive decision. The victory propelled Archer on a streak of 15 consecutive wins against some of the Middleweight division's top fighters, including England's Mick Leahy, Denny Moyer, Argentina's Farid Salim, Canada's Blair Richardson, Holley Mims, Rubin “Hurricane” Carter, and his most impressive career win, against future Hall-of-Famer and three time World champion Dick Tiger.

The final win in the streak was against “Sugar” Ray Robinson in what would be the last fight of Robinson's illustrious, Hall-of-Fame career. Having reached the top of the Middleweight division, Archer suffered an unexpected split decision loss to the ranked Don Fullmer.

Nevertheless, Archer earned a title challenge against Middleweight champion Griffith based on his recent winning streak. The title fight against Virgin Islander Griffith in 1966 was a hard-fought, close contest, and after 15 rounds of fighting, Griffith won by a majority decision.

Archer's dream of winning the prized Middleweight title went unfulfilled, as the referee ruled the contest a draw, with the other two judges voting in favor of the champion. Six months later, Archer would again fight Griffith for the Middleweight title, and would once again taste defeat in a very narrow, controversial decision.

== Retirement and death ==
“Irish” Joey Archer announced his retirement from boxing after the disappointment of these two bitter, close losses to Emile Griffith. He ended his career with a record of 45 victories (with 8 by KO) and only 4 defeats.

Although he never captured a world title, Archer's boxing skills earned him induction into the World Boxing Hall of Fame in 2005. He is on the eligibility list of the International Boxing Hall of Fame.

Archer died at a nursing home on April 25, 2025, at the age of 87.

== Professional boxing record ==
| 49 fights | 45 wins | 4 losses |
|---|---|---|
| By knockout | 8 | 0 |
| By decision | 37 | 4 |

| No. | Result | Record | Opponent | Type | Round, time | Date | Location | Notes |
|---|---|---|---|---|---|---|---|---|
| 49 | Loss | 45–4 | Emile Griffith | UD | 15 | Jan 23, 1967 | Madison Square Garden, New York City, New York, US | For WBA, WBC, and The Ring middleweight titles |
| 48 | Loss | 45–3 | Emile Griffith | MD | 15 | Jul 13, 1966 | Madison Square Garden, New York City, New York, US | For WBA, WBC, and The Ring middleweight titles |
| 47 | Loss | 45–2 | Don Fullmer | SD | 12 | Dec 13, 1965 | Boston Garden, Boston, Massachusetts, US | For WBA American middleweight title |
| 46 | Win | 45–1 | Sugar Ray Robinson | UD | 10 | Nov 10, 1965 | Civic Arena, Pittsburgh, Pennsylvania, US | |
| 45 | Win | 44–1 | Johnny Torres | PTS | 10 | Feb 20, 1965 | Market Street Armory, Paterson, New Jersey, US | |
| 44 | Win | 43–1 | Dick Tiger | SD | 10 | Oct 16, 1964 | Madison Square Garden, New York City, New York, US | |
| 43 | Win | 42–1 | Gaylord Barnes | UD | 10 | Jul 30, 1964 | Wahconah Park, Pittsfield, Massachusetts, US | |
| 42 | Win | 41–1 | Willie James | TKO | 9 (10), 1:51 | Jun 24, 1964 | Wahconah Park, Pittsfield, Massachusetts, US | |
| 41 | Win | 40–1 | Gaylord Barnes | UD | 10 | May 27, 1964 | City Arena, Richmond, Virginia, US | |
| 40 | Win | 39–1 | Johnny Torres | UD | 10 | May 9, 1964 | Arena, Boston, Massachusetts, US | |
| 39 | Win | 38–1 | Holley Mims | SD | 10 | Feb 7, 1964 | Madison Square Garden, New York City, New York, US | |
| 38 | Win | 37–1 | Rubin Carter | SD | 10 | Oct 25, 1963 | Madison Square Garden, New York City, New York, US | |
| 37 | Win | 36–1 | Farid Salim | UD | 10 | Jul 13, 1963 | Madison Square Garden, New York City, New York, US | |
| 36 | Win | 35–1 | Víctor Zalazar | UD | 10 | May 18, 1963 | Madison Square Garden, New York City, New York, US | |
| 35 | Win | 34–1 | Blair Richardson | UD | 10 | Feb 16, 1963 | Madison Square Garden, New York City, New York, US | |
| 34 | Win | 33–1 | Denny Moyer | UD | 10 | Jan 5, 1963 | Madison Square Garden, New York City, New York, US | |
| 33 | Win | 32–1 | Mick Leahy | UD | 10 | Nov 10, 1961 | Madison Square Garden, New York City, New York, US | |
| 32 | Win | 31–1 | Jose Gonzalez | UD | 10 | Aug 25, 1961 | Madison Square Garden, New York City, New York, US | |
| 31 | Loss | 30–1 | Jose Gonzalez | SD | 10 | Jun 23, 1961 | Madison Square Garden, New York City, New York, US | |
| 30 | Win | 30–0 | Don Fullmer | MD | 10 | Feb 4, 1961 | Madison Square Garden, New York City, New York, US | |
| 29 | Win | 29–0 | Joe Rubino | UD | 8 | Oct 24, 1960 | St. Nicholas Arena, New York City, New York, US | |
| 28 | Win | 28–0 | Cheffy Reyna | KO | 2 (6) | Jun 16, 1960 | Municipal Auditorium, Pensacola, Florida, US | |
| 27 | Win | 27–0 | Babe Vance | UD | 8 | Jan 19, 1960 | Sports Arena, Amarillo, Texas, US | |
| 26 | Win | 26–0 | Aman Peck | UD | 8 | Nov 24, 1959 | Municipal Auditorium, San Antonio, Texas, US | |
| 25 | Win | 25–0 | Henry Burton | UD | 10 | Nov 9, 1959 | Mayfair Arena, Tyler, Texas, US | |
| 24 | Win | 24–0 | Ralph Lucas | TKO | 4 (8) | Jul 4, 1959 | Bandera, Texas, US | |
| 23 | Win | 23–0 | Tony Dupas | UD | 10 | May 12, 1959 | City Auditorium, Houston, Texas, US | |
| 22 | Win | 22–0 | Tony Dupas | TD | 7 (10) | Mar 10, 1959 | Sam Houston Coliseum, Houston, Texas, US | Archer suffered a bad cut from a head-butt, and was unable to continue |
| 21 | Win | 21–0 | Ken Biggs | RTD | 4 (6) | Feb 11, 1959 | Sam Houston Coliseum, Houston, Texas, US | |
| 20 | Win | 20–0 | Ruben Flores | PTS | 4 | Dec 9, 1958 | Sam Houston Coliseum, Houston, Texas, US | |
| 19 | Win | 19–0 | Willie Estes | KO | 1 (4) | Dec 1, 1958 | Memorial Auditorium, Dallas, Texas, US | |
| 18 | Win | 18–0 | Willie Estes | PTS | 4 | Nov 25, 1958 | City Auditorium, Houston, Texas, US | |
| 17 | Win | 17–0 | Ray Sheppard | PTS | 8 | Nov 5, 1958 | Exhibition Hall, Miami Beach, Florida, US | |
| 16 | Win | 16–0 | Bernie Raines | PTS | 6 | Jul 28, 1958 | St. Nicholas Arena, New York City, New York, US | |
| 15 | Win | 15–0 | Julie Jamison | UD | 6 | Jun 2, 1958 | St. Nicholas Arena, New York City, New York, US | |
| 14 | Win | 14–0 | Joe Lissy | UD | 6 | Mar 17, 1958 | St. Nicholas Arena, New York City, New York, US | |
| 13 | Win | 13–0 | Eddie Prince | UD | 6 | Feb 14, 1958 | Madison Square Garden, New York City, New York, US | |
| 12 | Win | 12–0 | Joe Lissy | UD | 6 | Dec 20, 1957 | Madison Square Garden, New York City, New York, US | |
| 11 | Win | 11–0 | Paul Griffin | UD | 6 | Nov 11, 1957 | St. Nicholas Arena, New York City, New York, US | |
| 10 | Win | 10–0 | Jimmy Landron | TKO | 4 (4) | Sep 30, 1957 | St. Nicholas Arena, New York City, New York, US | |
| 9 | Win | 9–0 | Danny Jones | TKO | 4 (4) | Sep 9, 1957 | St. Nicholas Arena, New York City, New York, US | |
| 8 | Win | 8–0 | Johnny Lissy | PTS | 4 | Aug 2, 1957 | St. Nicholas Arena, New York City, New York, US | |
| 7 | Win | 7–0 | Bernie Raines | UD | 4 | Jul 8, 1957 | St. Nicholas Arena, New York City, New York, US | |
| 6 | Win | 6–0 | Hiram Vale | UD | 4 | May 13, 1957 | St. Nicholas Arena, New York City, New York, US | |
| 5 | Win | 5–0 | Silby Ford | PTS | 4 | Apr 29, 1957 | St. Nicholas Arena, New York City, New York, US | |
| 4 | Win | 4–0 | Silby Ford | PTS | 4 | Mar 8, 1957 | St. Nicholas Arena, New York City, New York, US | |
| 3 | Win | 3–0 | Whitey Porr | TKO | 4 (4), 0:56 | Mar 8, 1957 | Madison Square Garden, New York City, New York, US | |
| 2 | Win | 2–0 | Danny Jones | PTS | 4 | Dec 21, 1956 | Madison Square Garden, New York City, New York, US | |
| 1 | Win | 1–0 | Danny Jones | PTS | 4 | Nov 8, 1956 | Sunnyside Garden, New York City, New York, US | |
