= Indio (1989 film) =

- Italian theatrical release poster by Renato Casaro
- Directed by: Antonio Margheriti
- Written by: Filiberto Bandini; Franco Bucceri
- Produced by: Filiberto Bandini
- Starring: Francesco Quinn
- Cinematography: Sergio D'Offizi
- Edited by: Christopher Holmes
- Music by: Pino Donaggio
- Distributed by: Filmauro
- Release date: 1 September 1989
- Running time: 89 minutes
- Country: Italy
- Languages: Italian; English

Indio is a 1989 Italian action film starring Francesco Quinn and directed by Antonio Margheriti.

== Plot Outline ==
An American Indian and war veteran decides to fight a huge construction company to save his jungle homeland and, at the same time, the amazon rainforest from the destruction.

== Cast ==
- Francesco Quinn as Daniel Morell
- Marvelous Marvin Hagler as Jake
- Brian Dennehy as Whytaker
- Tetchie Agbayani as Morell's friend
- Rene Abadeza as Tribesman (uncredited)
- Larry Atlas as "Moose" (uncredited)
- David Brass as Head Guard (uncredited)
- David Light as Softball Team Member (uncredited)
- Berto Spoor as Softball Team Member (uncredited)
- Bari K. Willerford as Softball Team Member (uncredited)

== Release ==
The film was released in Italy on September 1, 1989

== Sequel ==
- Indio 2: The Revolt (1991)

== See also ==
- List of Italian films of 1989
