= Don Fullmer =

American boxer

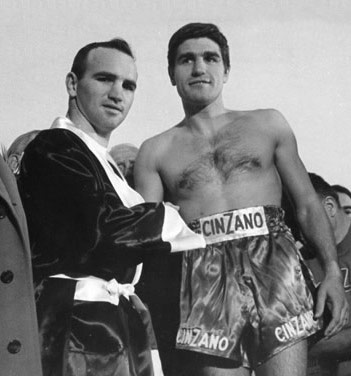
- Fullmer (left) with Nino Benvenuti in 1968

Personal information
- Nationality: American
- Born: Don Rulon Fullmer; February 21, 1939 West Jordan, Utah, U.S.
- Died: January 28, 2012 (aged 72) West Jordan, Utah, U.S.
- Height: 5 ft 8 in (173 cm)
- Weight: Middleweight

Boxing career
- Reach: 70 in (178 cm)
- Stance: Orthodox

Boxing record
- Total fights: 79
- Wins: 54
- Win by KO: 14
- Losses: 20
- Draws: 5

Don Fullmer (February 21, 1939 – January 28, 2012) was an American professional boxer and a brother of the former world middleweight champion Gene Fullmer. Eight years younger than his more famous brother, Don followed Gene into the gym in West Jordan, Utah, to learn how to box. He fought as an amateur for four years and did not lose in sixty-five fights. Another brother, Jay, was also active in boxing.

== Boxing career ==
Don turned professional in 1957 as a middleweight and beat some top contenders during his early career, such as Rocky Fumerelle, Rocky Rivero, and Joe DeNucci. However, he also lost to some good fighters, such as former champions Terry Downes, Dick Tiger, José Torres and Emile Griffith, as well as Joey Archer.

In 1964 he beat Jimmy Ellis, who later went on to win the World Boxing Association version of the heavyweight championship. The win against Ellis began a winning streak for Fullmer and he went on to defeat Griffith and Archer in rematches. This streak ended when he lost to Nino Benvenuti in Rome in 1966. Benvenuti went on to win the middleweight title, and after Fullmer beat Carl "Bobo" Olson he fought a rematch with Benvenuti for the title in 1968. He knocked the Italian down but lost a fifteen-round unanimous decision. While never a recognized world champion, Fullmer did win a bout billed as for the "World Junior Light Heavyweight Championship" when he defeated Joe Hopkins in 1967. This title was the precursor to the current super middleweight championship. Few in the boxing world recognized the legitimacy of that title.

Fullmer retired from the ring in 1972. After his retirement, he worked for the Salt Lake County Fire Department. Along with his brothers, and he ran the Fullmer Brothers boxing gym in West Jordan. The gym provided for kids to work out for free.

== Death ==
Don Fullmer died of leukemia on January 28, 2012, aged 72 in West Jordan, Utah. He was survived by his wife, Nedra and his five sons.

== Filmography ==
- The Devil's Brigade (1968) - The G.I.

== Professional boxing record ==
79 fights	54 wins	20 losses
By knockout	14	2
By decision	40	18
Draws	5	

No.	Result	Record	Opponent	Type	Round, time	Date	Location	Notes
79	Loss	54–20–5	Richie Kates	UD	10	Sep 24, 1972	Spectrum, Philadelphia, Pennsylvania, US	
78	Win	54–19–5	Andy Kendall	SD	10	Apr 21, 1972	Capital Plaza, Frankfort, Kentucky, US	
77	Win	53–19–5	Billy Freeman	MD	10	Jan 13, 1972	Williamsport, Pennsylvania, US	
76	Win	52–19–5	Lino Rendon	UD	10	Oct 14, 1972	Cedar City, Utah, US	
75	Win	51–19–5	Amado Vasquez	KO	1 (10), 1:27	May 22, 1972	Salt Palace, Salt Lake City, Utah, US	
74	Loss	50–19–5	Pierre Fourie	UD	10	Feb 19, 1972	Ellis Park Tennis Stadium, Johannesburg, South Africa	
73	Win	50–18–5	Billy Wagner	UD	10	Oct 19, 1971	Arena, Cleveland, Ohio, US	
72	Win	49–18–5	Dave Thach	SD	10	Sep 16, 1971	Read Fieldhouse, Kalamazoo, Michigan, US	
71	Loss	48–18–5	Eugene Hart	UD	10	Jun 22, 1971	Spectrum, Philadelphia, Pennsylvania, US	
70	Loss	48–17–5	Bobby Cassidy	SD	10	Apr 26, 1971	Felt Forum, New York City, New York, US	
69	Loss	48–16–5	Tom Bogs	PTS	10	Feb 11, 1971	K.B. Hallen, Copenhagen, Denmark	
68	Draw	48–15–5	Billy Douglas	PTS	10	Jul 11, 1970	Lausche Building, Columbus, Ohio, US	
67	Draw	48–15–4	Tom Bogs	PTS	10	Feb 12, 1970	Skojtehal, Gladsaxe, Denmark	
66	Loss	48–15–3	Doyle Baird	SD	10	Oct 29, 1969	Arena, Cleveland, Ohio, US	
65	Win	48–14–3	Juarez de Lima	SD	10	May 26, 1969	Madison Square Garden, New York City, New York, US	
64	Loss	47–14–3	Nino Benvenuti	UD	15	Dec 14, 1968	Teatro Ariston, San Remo, Italy	For WBA, WBC, and The Ring middleweight titles
63	Win	47–13–3	Polo Corona	UD	10	Sep 18, 1968	Star Theater, Phoenix, Arizona, US	
62	Win	46–13–3	Gene Bryant	UD	10	May 29, 1968	Derks Field, Salt Lake City, Utah, US	
61	Win	45–13–3	Billy Marsh	UD	10	Apr 25, 1968	Madison Square Garden, Phoenix, Arizona, US	
60	Win	44–13–3	Carl Moore	SD	10	Feb 20, 1968	Madison Square Garden, Phoenix, Arizona, US	
59	Win	43–13–3	Ted Wright	UD	10	Sep 22, 1967	Weber State College Gymnasium, Ogden, Utah, US	
58	Win	42–13–3	Luis Garduno	TKO	2 (10)	Jun 22, 1967	Adams Field House, Missoula, Montana, US	
57	Win	41–13–3	Joe Hopkins	TKO	6 (12), 1:19	Apr 3, 1967	Valley Music Hall, Salt Lake City, Utah, US	
56	Win	40–13–3	Bobo Olson	MD	10	Nov 28, 1966	Oakland Arena, Oakland, California, US	
55	Win	39–13–3	Tony Montano	UD	10	Oct 17, 1966	Sportatorium, Phoenix, Arizona, US	
54	Win	38–13–3	Stan Harrington	UD	10	Apr 25, 1966	Honolulu International Center, Honolulu, Hawaii, US	
53	Loss	37–13–3	Jose Gonzalez	UD	12	Mar 18, 1966	Madison Square Garden, New York City, New York, US	Lost WBA American middleweight title
52	Loss	37–12–3	Nino Benvenuti	UD	12	Feb 4, 1966	Palazzetto dello Sport, Roma, Italy	
51	Win	37–11–3	Joey Archer	SD	12	Dec 13, 1965	Boston Garden, Boston, Massachusetts, US	Retained WBA American middleweight title
50	Win	36–11–3	Emile Griffith	UD	12	Aug 19, 1965	Fairgrounds Coliseum, Salt Lake City, Utah, US	Won vacant WBA American middleweight title
49	Win	35–11–3	Gene Bryant	UD	10	Jun 21, 1965	West Jordan Park, West Jordan, Utah, US	
48	Draw	34–11–3	Andy Kendall	SD	10	Apr 27, 1965	Hacienda Hotel, Las Vegas, Nevada, US	
47	Win	34–11–2	Ferd Hernandez	UD	10	Feb 23, 1965	Hacienda Hotel, Las Vegas, Nevada, US	
46	Win	33–11–2	Jimmy Ellis	SD	10	Oct 21, 1964	Convention Center, Louisville, Kentucky, US	
45	Loss	32–11–2	Dick Tiger	UD	10	Sep 11, 1964	Arena, Cleveland, Ohio, US	
44	Win	32–10–2	Ron Thompson	TKO	1 (10), 2:13	Aug 15, 1964	Lane County Fairgrounds, Eugene, Oregon, US	
43	Draw	31–10–2	Fred Roots	TD	5 (10)	Apr 14, 1964	Memorial Auditorium, Sacramento, California, US	Stopped on cuts after an accidental headbutt
42	Loss	31–10–1	Souleymane Diallo	PTS	10	Dec 23, 1963	Palais des Sports, Paris, France	
41	Loss	31–9–1	José Torres	PTS	10	Oct 9, 1963	Armory, Teaneck, New Jersey, US	
40	Win	31–8–1	Bobby Horn	UD	10	Jul 3, 1963	Lane County Fairgrounds, Eugene, Oregon, US	
39	Loss	30–8–1	Sandro Mazzinghi	TKO	8 (10), 2:59	May 5, 1963	Velodromo Vigorelli, Milan, Italy	
38	Win	30–7–1	Eddie Andrews	UD	10	Apr 18, 1963	Mathisen's Hall, Reno, Nevada, US	
37	Win	29–7–1	Eddie Andrews	UD	10	Feb 14, 1963	Fairgrounds Coliseum, Salt Lake City, Utah, US	
36	Loss	28–7–1	Emile Griffith	UD	10	Oct 6, 1962	Madison Square Garden, New York City, New York, US	
35	Win	28–6–1	Juan Carlos Rivero	SD	10	Jul 21, 1962	Madison Square Garden, New York City, New York, US	
34	Loss	27–6–1	Terry Downes	PTS	10	May 22, 1962	Empire Pool, London, England, UK	
33	Win	27–5–1	Joe DeNucci	UD	10	Mar 16, 1962	Boston Garden, Boston, Massachusetts, US	
32	Loss	26–5–1	Ted Wright	TKO	7 (10)	Aug 12, 1961	Madison Square Garden, New York City, New York, US	
31	Win	26–4–1	Rocky Fumerelle	UD	10	Jul 15, 1961	Madison Square Garden, New York City, New York, US	
30	Loss	25–4–1	Joey Archer	MD	10	Feb 4, 1961	Madison Square Garden, New York City, New York, US	
29	Win	25–3–1	Buck Bellamy	UD	10	Nov 11, 1960	George Nelson Field House, Logan, Utah, US	
28	Draw	24–3–1	Gustav Scholz	PTS	10	Sep 14, 1960	Festhalle, Frankfurt, West Germany	
27	Win	24–3	Stefan Redl	UD	10	May 11, 1960	Jenson's Gym, West Jordan, Utah, US	
26	Win	23–3	JC Johnson	UD	8	Mar 28, 1960	West Jordan, Utah, US	
25	Win	22–3	Billy Blair	UD	8	Mar 5, 1960	Athletic Club, West Jordan, Utah, US	
24	Win	21–3	James Shorty	TKO	5 (8), 1:15	Feb 20, 1960	Jenson's Gym, West Jordan, Utah, US	
23	Win	20–3	Virgil Akins	UD	10	Jan 28, 1960	Kiel Auditorium, Saint Louis, Missouri, US	
22	Win	19–3	Doug Garrett	PTS	6	Dec 4, 1959	George Nelson Field House, Logan, Utah, US	
21	Loss	18–3	Phil Moyer	UD	10	Aug 18, 1959	Auditorium, Portland, Oregon, US	
20	Loss	18–2	Eddie Andrews	MD	10	Jul 6, 1959	Convention Center, Las Vegas, Nevada, US	
19	Loss	18–1	Orlando DePietro	PTS	10	Apr 4, 1959	Polo Grounds, Palm Springs, California, US	
18	Win	18–0	Cornell Olds	KO	3 (6)	Feb 9, 1959	Eldred Recreation Center, Provo, Utah, US	
17	Win	17–0	Cornell Olds	KO	4 (6)	Jan 16, 1959	Uintah High School Gym, Vernal, Utah, US	
16	Win	16–0	Roscoe Shamblin	UD	6	Dec 15, 1958	Arena, Cleveland, Ohio, US	
15	Win	15–0	Willie Fuller	KO	1 (8)	Nov 29, 1958	Kanab, Utah, US	
14	Win	14–0	Dick Bankhead	KO	1 (6)	Nov 10, 1958	Fairgrounds Coliseum, Salt Lake City, Utah, US	
13	Win	13–0	Curtis Barker	KO	2 (4)	Oct 13, 1958	West Jordan Elementary School, West Jordan, Utah, US	
12	Win	12–0	Andy Maes	PTS	6	Sep 11, 1958	Derks Field, Salt Lake City, Utah, US	
11	Win	11–0	Chico Cirini	UD	6	Jul 26, 1958	Arena, West Jordan, Utah, US	
10	Win	10–0	Elmer Carter	PTS	5	Jul 7, 1958	Arena, West Jordan, Utah, US	
9	Win	9–0	Cornell Olds	KO	2 (5)	Jun 4, 1958	West Jordan Park, West Jordan, Utah, US	
8	Win	8–0	Frank Fellsen	PTS	6	Apr 19, 1958	Springville, Utah, US	
7	Win	7–0	Cornell Olds	PTS	6	Apr 5, 1958	Cedar City, Utah, US	
6	Win	6–0	Elmer Carter	PTS	5	Mar 3, 1958	Fairgrounds Coliseum, Salt Lake City, Utah, US	
5	Win	5–0	Billy O'Neill	UD	6	Feb 10, 1958	Fairgrounds Coliseum, Salt Lake City, Utah, US	
4	Win	4–0	Amond Cadoll	UD	6	Feb 1, 1958	Southern Utah University Fieldhouse, Cedar City, Utah, US	
3	Win	3–0	Cornell Olds	TKO	2 (6)	Jan 28, 1958	Fairgrounds Coliseum, Salt Lake City, Utah, US	
2	Win	2–0	Johnny Hudson	KO	1 (4)	Sep 4, 1957	Arena, West Jordan, Utah, US	
1	Win	1–0	Joe Mortenson	TKO	3 (6), 2:40	Aug 2, 1957	West Jordan, Utah, US	
