= Bobby Watts =

American boxer (born 1949)

Bobby "Boogaloo" Watts (born November 11, 1949) is an American born middleweight boxer who fought primarily in the mid-1970s. Born in Sumter County, South Carolina in a small town named Rembert, Bobby Watts came to Philadelphia at age 10 and began boxing at the urging of his cousin, future heavyweight contender Jimmy Young.

"Boogaloo" is most famously known for defeating Marvelous Marvin Hagler, scoring a controversial 10-round majority decision on January 13, 1976, at The Spectrum in Philadelphia. Among his losses were a defeat to Mustafa Hamsho, via a sixth-round knockout, in a fight that was refereed by Larry Hazzard.

He finished his career with a record of 38 wins (20 KOs), 7 losses and 1 draw. After his boxing career ended in 1982, Watts trained IBF super middleweight champion Charles Brewer and IBF world Super-Welterweight champion Buster Drayton.

== Professional boxing record ==
38 Wins (20 knockouts, 18 decisions), 7 Losses (6 knockouts, 1 decision), 1 Draw Archived March 28, 2014, at the Wayback Machine
Result	Record	Opponent	Type	Round	Date	Location	Notes
Loss	21-0	(United Kingdom) Mark Kaylor	TKO	4	03/05/1983	(England) Wembley Arena, Wembley, London, United Kingdom	Referee stopped the bout at 0:57 of the fourth round.
Win	4-2-1	(United States) Dennis "The Menace" Roberts	KO	5	02/09/1982	Hershey Sports Arena, Hershey, Pennsylvania, United States	
Win	5-14-1	(United States) Fred "Flintstone" Reed	KO	6	13/02/1982	Camden, South Carolina, United States	
Win	2-6	(United States) Lonnie Wilcox	KO	1	26/12/1981	Camden Municipal Arena, Camden, South Carolina, United States	Wilcox knocked out at 1:21 of the first round.
Win	5-9	(United States) Willie Ray Taylor	KO	7	10/11/1981	Spartanburg, South Carolina, United States	
Loss	47-2-2	(United States) Marvelous Marvin Hagler	TKO	2	19/04/1980	Cumberland County Civic Center, Portland, Maine, United States	
Win	12-4	(United States) Fred "Thump" Johnson	KO	3	01/02/1980	Philadelphia Spectrum, Philadelphia, Pennsylvania, United States	Johnson knocked out at 2:45 of the third round.
Win	6-9-1	(United States) Clifford Wills	TKO	3	30/10/1979	Upper Darby Forum, Upper Darby Township, Pennsylvania, United States	Referee stopped the bout at 0:10 of the third round.
Win	21-6-5	(Argentina) Norberto Rufino Cabrera	PTS	8	02/12/1978	Marsala Sports Palace, Marsala, Italy	
Loss	15-1-2	(Syria) Mustafa Hamsho	TKO	6	21/09/1978	Jersey City, New Jersey, United States	
Win	13-9	(United States) Johnny Heard	PTS	10	03/06/1978	Baltimore Civic Center, Baltimore, Maryland, United States	
Loss	28-12	(United States) David "Chevy" Love	TKO	4	27/03/1977	Randolph AFB, San Antonio, Texas, United States	Referee stopped the bout at 1:41 of the fourth round.
Win	--	(Guyana) Reggie Ford	UD	10	22/01/1977	Pensacola Civic Auditorium, Pensacola, Florida, United States	
Win	7-3-3	(United States) Casey Gacic	TKO	7	14/07/1976	Philadelphia Convention Hall, Philadelphia, Pennsylvania, United States	
Win	13-26-1	(United States) Ernie Burns	TKO	2	10/05/1976	Philadelphia Arena, Philadelphia, Pennsylvania, United States	Referee stopped the bout at 2:48 of the second round.
Win	25-0-1	(United States) Marvelous Marvin Hagler	MD	10	13/01/1976	Philadelphia Spectrum, Philadelphia, Pennsylvania, United States	46-46, 46-44, 48-44.
Win	11-3-1	(United States) James "Sweet" Marshall	TKO	9	16/09/1975	Philadelphia Spectrum, Philadelphia, Pennsylvania, United States	Referee stopped the bout at 2:55 of the ninth round.
Win	29-2-1	(United States) Willie "The Worm" Monroe	UD	10	12/11/1974	Philadelphia Spectrum, Philadelphia, Pennsylvania, United States	
Win	24-3	(United States) Eugene "Cyclone" Hart	KO	1	15/07/1974	Philadelphia Spectrum, Philadelphia, Pennsylvania, United States	Hart knocked out at 2:49 of the first round.
Win	12-3	(United States) Mario Rosa	SD	10	17/12/1973	(New York (state)) Felt Forum, New York City, United States	
Win	32-22-9	(Argentina) Carlos Alberto Salinas	TKO	8	08/10/1973	Philadelphia Spectrum, Philadelphia, Pennsylvania, United States	
Win	60-28-6	(United States) Manuel "Manny" Gonzalez	UD	10	23/07/1973	Philadelphia Convention Hall, Philadelphia, Pennsylvania, United States	
Win	21-10-1	(United States) Don Cobbs	KO	3	24/05/1973	Philadelphia Arena, Philadelphia, Pennsylvania, United States	Cobbs knocked out at 2:49 of the third round.
Win	20-23-4	(Canada) Gary Broughton	PTS	10	09/04/1973	Philadelphia Arena, Philadelphia, Pennsylvania, United States	
Win	36-17-1	(United States) Willie "Sweetwater" Warren	UD	10	05/03/1973	Philadelphia Spectrum, Philadelphia, Pennsylvania, United States	
Loss	18-8-1	(United States) Don Cobbs	KO	2	20/11/1972	Philadelphia Spectrum, Philadelphia, Pennsylvania, United States	Watts knocked out at 2:04 of the second round.
Win	31-10-1	(United States) Alvin Phillips	UD	10	20/10/1972	(New York (state)) Madison Square Garden, New York City, United States	8-2, 6-4, 7-3.
Win	23-2-1	(United States) Ralph Palladin	TKO	6	20/06/1972	Baltimore Convention Center, Baltimore, Maryland, United States	
Draw	23-2	(United States) Ralph Palladin	PTS	10	05/04/1972	Catholic Youth Center, Scranton, Pennsylvania, United States	
Win	22-1	(United States) Ralph Palladin	PTS	10	01/12/1971	Catholic Youth Center, Scranton, Pennsylvania, United States	
Win	7-2	(United States) Roy "Smoky" Edmonds	TKO	5	08/10/1971	(New York (state)) Felt Forum, New York City, United States	Referee stopped the bout at 1:09 of the fifth round.
Win	17-15-5	(Puerto Rico) Luis Vinales	PTS	10	21/09/1971	Philadelphia Spectrum, Philadelphia, Pennsylvania, United States	
Win	8-13-1	(United States) Junius Hinton	KO	5	10/08/1971	Philadelphia Spectrum, Philadelphia, Pennsylvania, United States	
Win	9-3-1	(Puerto Rico) Julio Figueroa	UD	8	07/06/1971	The Blue Horizon, Philadelphia, Pennsylvania, United States	
Win	8-4-1	(United States) Perry Abney	TKO	7	29/04/1971	Philadelphia Arena, Philadelphia, Pennsylvania, United States	
Win	3-1	(United States) Roy "Smoky" Edmonds	PTS	6	09/02/1971	The Blue Horizon, Philadelphia, Pennsylvania, United States	
Win	--	Ken Robbins	KO	1	24/11/1970	The Blue Horizon, Philadelphia, Pennsylvania, United States	Robbins knocked out at 2:58 of the first round.
Loss	4-0	(United States) Armando Muniz	PTS	6	03/09/1970	Olympic Auditorium, Los Angeles, California, United States	
Loss	10-0-1	(United States) Clarence "Butch" Geigger	TKO	6	25/04/1970	Las Vegas, Nevada, United States	
Win	--	"Real Mean" Joe Greene	KO	2	25/03/1970	Silver Slipper, Las Vegas, Nevada, United States	
Win	16-19-4	(United States) Tommy Shaffer	PTS	6	11/11/1969	The Blue Horizon, Philadelphia, Pennsylvania, United States	
Win	13-8	(United States) Leroy "Hurricane" Roberts	PTS	6	14/10/1969	The Blue Horizon, Philadelphia, Pennsylvania, United States	
Win	0-2	Ron "Boom Boom" Nesby	PTS	6	30/09/1969	The Blue Horizon, Philadelphia, Pennsylvania, United States	
Win	1-0	(United States) Carlos Byrd	KO	2	30/06/1969	Washington National Arena, Washington, District of Columbia, United States	
Win	3-1	(United States) Alberto Millan	TKO	4	28/03/1969	Steelworkers Hall, Baltimore, Maryland, United States	
Win	2-2	(United States) Teddy Cooper	PTS	6	13/03/1969	Steelworkers Hall, Baltimore, Maryland, United States	
