= Wilford Scypion =

American boxer

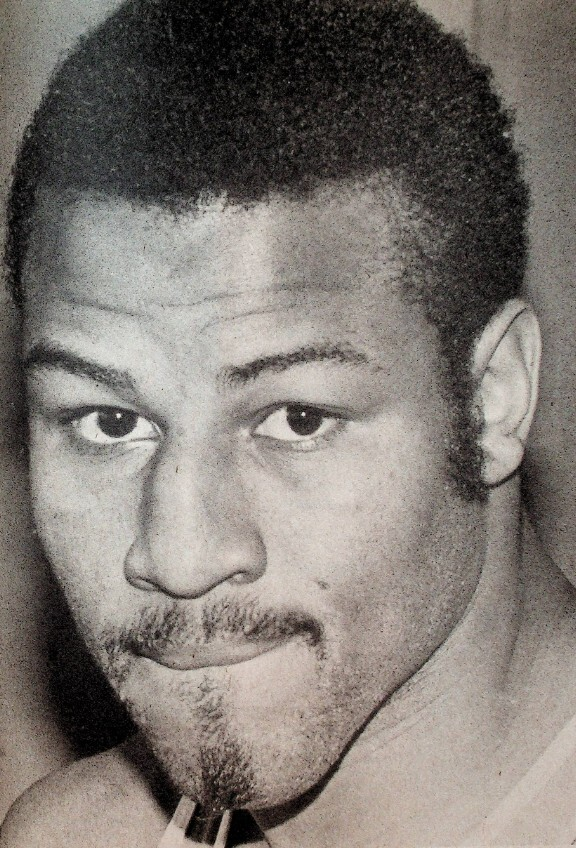
Scypion c. 1981

Wilford Scypion (July 18, 1958 – February 27, 2014) was an American professional boxer.

== Amateur career ==
Scypion was the National Golden Gloves Middleweight Champion in 1978.

== Pro career ==
In February 1983, Scypion beat Frank Fletcher by a twelve round decision to take the USBA's regional Middleweight title. This victory guaranteed him a world championship fight, against Marvelous Marvin Hagler. The two competitors met on May 27, in a fight televised by HBO Boxing, which was considered by many to show only the best fights available at the time. Scypion was knocked out in the fourth round in his only world title attempt, which was held in Providence, Rhode Island. It was the first bout to simultaneously decide the WBA, WBC and IBF titles in history.

In the ninth round of a bout at Madison Square Garden on November 23, 1979, Scypion made his 13th knockout in 13 pro fights, but inadvertently caused the fatal injury of Willie Classen, who died five days later without having regained consciousness.

== Death ==
Scypion died on February 27, 2014, from complications of pneumonia. He was 55.

== Professional boxing record ==
32 Wins (24 knockouts, 8 decisions), 9 Losses (5 knockouts, 4 decisions)
Result	Record	Opponent	Type	Round	Date	Location	Notes
Loss	33-9	Billy Wayne Lewis	KO	2	31/01/1991	Bayfront Auditorium, Pensacola, Florida, U.S.	Scypion knocked out at 0:26 of the second round.
Win	33-8	James Campbell	PTS	6	10/10/1990	Lake Charles, Louisiana, U.S.	
Win	32-8	Robert Green	KO	4	17/07/1990	Lake Charles, Louisiana, U.S.	Green knocked out at 1:51 of the fourth round.
Win	31-8	James Tarver	KO	1	27/04/1990	Rayne, Louisiana, U.S.	
Loss	30-8	Iran Barkley	KO	8	01/11/1985	Felt Forum, New York City, U.S.	Scypion knocked out at 2:59 of the eighth round.
Loss	30-7	Dwight Walker	UD	10	17/09/1985	Tropicana Hotel & Casino, Atlantic City, New Jersey, U.S.	
Win	30-6	Tyler Dupuy	UD	8	14/05/1985	Beaumont, Texas, U.S.	
Loss	29-6	Murray Sutherland	TKO	12	08/12/1984	Arizona Veterans Memorial Coliseum, Phoenix, Arizona, U.S.	IBF USBA Super Middleweight Title. Referee stopped the bout at 0:30 of the 12th round.
Win	29-5	Mauricio Hernandez da Cruz	TKO	4	03/11/1984	Midtown Neighborhood Center, Kingston, New York, U.S.	Referee stopped the bout at 0:29 of the fourth round.
Win	28-5	Doug Holiman	TKO	8	29/09/1984	Sullivan Arena, Anchorage, Alaska, U.S.	
Loss	27-5	Leroy Hester	TKO	10	05/08/1983	Beaumont Civic Center, Beaumont, Texas, U.S.	Referee stopped the bout at 0:45 of the tenth round.
Loss	26-5	Marvin Hagler	KO	4	27/05/1983	Providence Civic Center, Providence, Rhode Island, U.S.	IBF Middleweight Title. Scypion knocked out at 2:47 of the fourth round.
Win	26-4	Frank Fletcher	UD	12	13/02/1983	Sands Atlantic City, Atlantic City, New Jersey, U.S.	IBF USBA Middleweight Title.
Win	25-4	Bobby West	TKO	5	14/12/1982	Gilley's Club, Pasadena, Texas, U.S.	
Win	24-3	Irving Hines	PTS	10	16/09/1982	Port Arthur, Texas, U.S.	
Win	23-3	José Mireles	TKO	2	06/08/1982	Houston, Texas, U.S.	
Win	22-3	Mark Frazie	UD	10	11/07/1982	Oasis Ballroom, Tampa, Florida, U.S.	
Loss	21-3	James Green	PTS	10	14/03/1982	Atlantic City, New Jersey, U.S.	
Win	21-2	Siaosi George Tanoa	UD	10	28/11/1981	Caesars Tahoe, Stateline, Nevada, U.S.	
Loss	20-2	Dwight Davison	PTS	10	08/08/1981	Kiamesha Lake, New York, U.S.	
Win	20-1	Curtis Parker	PTS	10	03/05/1981	Brighton Hotel, Atlantic City, New Jersey, U.S.	
Win	19-1	Willie Ray Taylor	KO	5	13/12/1980	Jai Alai Fronton, Miami, Florida, U.S.	
Win	18-1	Mike Herron	TKO	4	24/10/1980	Nassau Coliseum, Uniondale, New York, U.S.	
Win	17-1	Fermín Guzmán	TKO	8	02/10/1980	Long Island Arena, Commack, New York, U.S.	
Loss	16-1	Mustafa Hamsho	DQ	10	15/06/1980	Clarkston, Michigan, U.S.	
Win	16-0	Bob Patterson	TKO	6	25/05/1980	Boardwalk Hall, Atlantic City, New Jersey, U.S.	
Win	15-0	Jerome Jackson	UD	8	23/02/1980	Resorts Atlantic City, Atlantic City, New Jersey, U.S.	
Win	14-0	Norris McKinney	KO	3	09/01/1980	Beaumont Civic Center, Beaumont, Texas, U.S.	McKinney knocked out at 2:47 of the third round.
Win	13-0	Willie Classen	KO	10	23/11/1979	Felt Forum, New York City, New York, U.S.	Classen died of injuries sustained in the fight 5 days later
Win	12-0	Manuel Torres	KO	2	10/10/1979	Beaumont Civic Center, Beaumont, Texas, U.S.	
Win	11-0	Jose Gamez	KO	6	14/09/1979	Houston Summit, Houston, Texas, U.S.	
Win	10-0	German Marquez	KO	2	15/08/1979	Beaumont Civic Center, Beaumont, Texas, U.S.	
Win	9-0	Arnell Thomas	KO	2	26/06/1979	Beaumont Civic Center, Beaumont, Texas, U.S.	
Win	8-0	Jesse Edwards	KO	2	22/05/1979	Beaumont, Texas, U.S.	
Win	7-0	Johnny Heard	KO	2	10/04/1979	Beaumont Civic Center, Beaumont, Texas, U.S.	
Win	6-0	Fred Johnson	KO	8	16/01/1979	Houston, Texas, U.S.	
Win	5-0	Miguel Garcia	TKO	4	28/11/1978	Houston, Texas, U.S.	
Win	4-0	Oscar Rios	KO	1	12/10/1978	Pasadena, Texas, U.S.	
Win	3-0	Carlos Terrazas	KO	2	19/09/1978	Houston, Texas, U.S.	
Win	2-10	Calvin Todd	KO	4	15/08/1978	Houston, Texas, U.S.	
Win	1-0	Dennis Haggerty	KO	1	18/07/1978	Houston, Texas, U.S.	
