= Eugene Hart =

American middleweight boxer (active 1969–1982)

Eugene "Cyclone" Hart (born June 16, 1951) was an American middleweight boxer who fought from 1969 to 1982. Hart never fought for the title and could not get a victory against the upper echelon fighters he faced. His best showing against a top notch fighter was when he fought "Bad" Bennie Briscoe to a 10 round draw on November 18, 1975. He was stopped in one round by Briscoe in their rematch on April 6, 1976. Another big win for Hart was the 10 round decision he earned over former Olympic champion Sugar Ray Seales on August 15, 1975.

Hart faced three future champions in his career. He suffered a 9 round TKO loss at the hands of future middleweight champion Marvin Hagler on September 14, 1976. Future light heavyweight champion Eddie Mustafa Muhammad knocked Hart out in the fourth round on August 26, 1974, and future middleweight king Vito Antuofermo KOed Hart in the fifth round of their March 11, 1977 match. The Antuofermo fight was typical of Hart's inability to get by championship caliber fighters. Hart came out throwing powerful left hooks to the head and body of Antuofermo. Some of Hart's left hooks actually lifted Antuofermo off the ground. When Antuofermo did not wilt under the furious attack, Hart lost confidence and the tide of battle turned. Appearing completely spent, Hart became defenseless and was knocked out.

Hart was trained by legendary boxing figure Cus D'Amato for a short period in 1973 and 1974, but another veteran, Sam Solomon, trained him before and after D'Amato. Hart never realized his great potential. Nevertheless, in 2003 Hart was named to the Ring Magazine's list of 100 greatest punchers of all time. His son is professional fighter Jesse Hart.

== Professional boxing record ==
30 Wins (28 knockouts, 2 decisions), 9 Losses (8 knockouts, 1 decision), 1 Draw, 1 No Contest Archived February 26, 2015, at the Wayback Machine
| Result | Record | Opponent | Type | Round | Date | Location | Notes |
| Loss | 30–9–2 | Tony Suero | KO | 4 | 09/02/1982 | Tropicana Hotel & Casino, Atlantic City, New Jersey, U.S. | |
| Loss | 30–8–2 | Vito Antuofermo | KO | 5 | 11/03/1977 | Philadelphia Arena, Philadelphia, Pennsylvania, U.S. | |
| Loss | 30–7–2 | Marvin Hagler | RTD | 8 | 14/09/1976 | Philadelphia Spectrum, Philadelphia, Pennsylvania, U.S. | |
| Win | 30–6–2 | Matt Donovan | KO | 2 | 11/08/1976 | Wagner Ballroom, Philadelphia, Pennsylvania, U.S. | |
| Loss | 29–6–2 | Bennie Briscoe | KO | 1 | 06/04/1976 | Philadelphia Spectrum, Philadelphia, Pennsylvania, U.S. | Hart knocked out at 1:49 of the first round |
| Win | 29–5–2 | Melvin Dennis | KO | 3 | 10/02/1976 | Philadelphia Spectrum, Philadelphia, Pennsylvania, U.S. | Dennis knocked out at 0:56 of the third round |
| Draw | 28–5–2 | Bennie Briscoe | PTS | 10 | 18/11/1975 | Philadelphia Spectrum, Philadelphia, Pennsylvania, U.S. | |
| Win | 28–5–1 | Sugar Ray Seales | PTS | 10 | 15/08/1975 | Boardwalk Hall, Atlantic City, New Jersey, U.S. | |
| Win | 27–5–1 | Chucho García | TKO | 6 | 02/06/1975 | Philadelphia Arena, Philadelphia, Pennsylvania, U.S. | Referee stopped the bout at 2:39 of the sixth round |
| Win | 26–5–1 | Mario Rosa | KO | 4 | 28/04/1975 | Philadelphia Arena, Philadelphia, Pennsylvania, U.S. | Rosa knocked out at 2:57 of the fourth round |
| Win | 25–5–1 | Radames Cabrera | KO | 8 | 31/01/1975 | Philadelphia Arena, Philadelphia, Pennsylvania, U.S. | Cabrera knocked out at 2:53 of the eighth round |
| Loss | 24–5–1 | Eddie Mustafa Muhammad | KO | 4 | 26/08/1974 | Felt Forum, New York City, New York, U.S. | Hart knocked out at 0:51 of the fourth round |
| Loss | 24–4–1 | Bobby Watts | KO | 1 | 15/07/1974 | Philadelphia Spectrum, Philadelphia, Pennsylvania, U.S. | Hart knocked out at 2:49 of the first round |
| Loss | 24–3–1 | Willie Monroe | UD | 10 | 18/02/1974 | Philadelphia Spectrum, Philadelphia, Pennsylvania, U.S. | |
| Win | 24–2–1 | Al Quinney | KO | 2 | 12/11/1973 | Philadelphia Spectrum, Philadelphia, Pennsylvania, U.S. | Quinney knocked out at 2:01 of the second round |
| Win | 23–2–1 | Thurman Holliday | KO | 2 | 06/08/1973 | Philadelphia Spectrum, Philadelphia, Pennsylvania, U.S. | Holliday knocked out at 0:33 of the second round |
| Loss | 22–2–1 | José González | TKO | 9 | 23/04/1973 | Philadelphia Arena, Philadelphia, Pennsylvania, U.S. | Referee stopped the bout at 1:32 of the ninth round |
| Loss | 22–1–1 | Nate Collins | TKO | 8 | 07/03/1972 | Philadelphia Arena, Philadelphia, Pennsylvania, U.S. | Referee stopped the bout at 3:00 of the eighth round |
| Win | 22–0–1 | Matt Donovan | KO | 2 | 07/02/1972 | Philadelphia Arena, Philadelphia, Pennsylvania, U.S. | Donovan knocked out at 2:39 of the second round |
| No Contest | 21–0–1 | Denny Moyer | NC | 6 | 21/09/1971 | Philadelphia Spectrum, Philadelphia, Pennsylvania, U.S. | Both fighters fell out of the ring and suffered injuries stopping the fight |
| Win | 21–0 | Fate Davis | KO | 5 | 10/08/1971 | Philadelphia Spectrum, Philadelphia, Pennsylvania, U.S. | |
| Win | 20–0 | Don Fullmer | UD | 10 | 22/06/1971 | Philadelphia Spectrum, Philadelphia, Pennsylvania, U.S. | |
| Win | 19–0 | Stanley Hayward | TKO | 1 | 03/05/1971 | Philadelphia Arena, Philadelphia, Pennsylvania, U.S. | Referee stopped the bout at 1:00 of the first round |
| Win | 18–0 | Jim Meilleur | TKO | 4 | 22/03/1971 | Philadelphia Arena, Philadelphia, Pennsylvania, U.S. | Referee stopped the bout at 1:59 of the fourth round |
| Win | 17–0 | Freddie Martinovich | KO | 3 | 26/01/1971 | The Blue Horizon, Philadelphia, Pennsylvania, U.S. | Martinovich knocked out at 1:40 of the third round |
| Win | 16–0 | Jim J Davis | KO | 4 | 09/12/1970 | The Blue Horizon, Philadelphia, Pennsylvania, U.S. | |
| Win | 15–0 | Dave Dittmar | KO | 5 | 17/11/1970 | Philadelphia Spectrum, Philadelphia, Pennsylvania, U.S. | Dittmar knocked out at 0:43 of the fifth round |
| Win | 14–0 | Humberto Trottman | KO | 2 | 02/11/1970 | Philadelphia Arena, Philadelphia, Pennsylvania, U.S. | |
| Win | 13–0 | Leroy Roberts | TKO | 4 | 16/09/1970 | The Blue Horizon, Philadelphia, Pennsylvania, U.S. | |
| Win | 12–0 | Humberto Trottman | KO | 5 | 16/06/1970 | Philadelphia Arena, Philadelphia, Pennsylvania, U.S. | Trottman knocked out at 2:00 of the fifth round |
| Win | 11–0 | John Saunders | TKO | 4 | 26/05/1970 | Fournier Hall, Wilmington, Delaware, U.S. | |
| Win | 10–0 | Sonny Floyd | KO | 1 | 18/05/1970 | The Blue Horizon, Philadelphia, Pennsylvania, U.S. | Floyd knocked out at 0:58 of the first round |
| Win | 9–0 | Vernon Mason | KO | 3 | 07/04/1970 | The Blue Horizon, Philadelphia, Pennsylvania, U.S. | |
| Win | 8–0 | John Saunders | KO | 3 | 25/03/1970 | The Blue Horizon, Philadelphia, Pennsylvania, U.S. | Saunders knocked out at 1:42 of the third round |
| Win | 7–0 | Gene Masters | KO | 1 | 25/02/1970 | The Blue Horizon, Philadelphia, Pennsylvania, U.S. | Masters knocked out at 2:57 of the first round |
| Win | 6–0 | Joe Williams | KO | 1 | 27/01/1970 | The Blue Horizon, Philadelphia, Pennsylvania, U.S. | |
| Win | 5–0 | Sam Mosley | KO | 1 | 13/01/1970 | The Blue Horizon, Philadelphia, Pennsylvania, U.S. | Mosley knocked out at 2:08 of the first round |
| Win | 4–0 | Art Kettles | TKO | 3 | 09/12/1969 | The Blue Horizon, Philadelphia, Pennsylvania, U.S. | |
| Win | 3–0 | Al Thomas | KO | 2 | 11/11/1969 | The Blue Horizon, Philadelphia, Pennsylvania, U.S. | |
| Win | 2–0 | Sonny Gravely | KO | 1 | 14/10/1969 | The Blue Horizon, Philadelphia, Pennsylvania, U.S. | |
| Win | 1–0 | Sheldon Moore | KO | 1 | 30/09/1969 | The Blue Horizon, Philadelphia, Pennsylvania, U.S. | |
