= Marvelous Marvin Hagler =

American boxer (1954–2021)

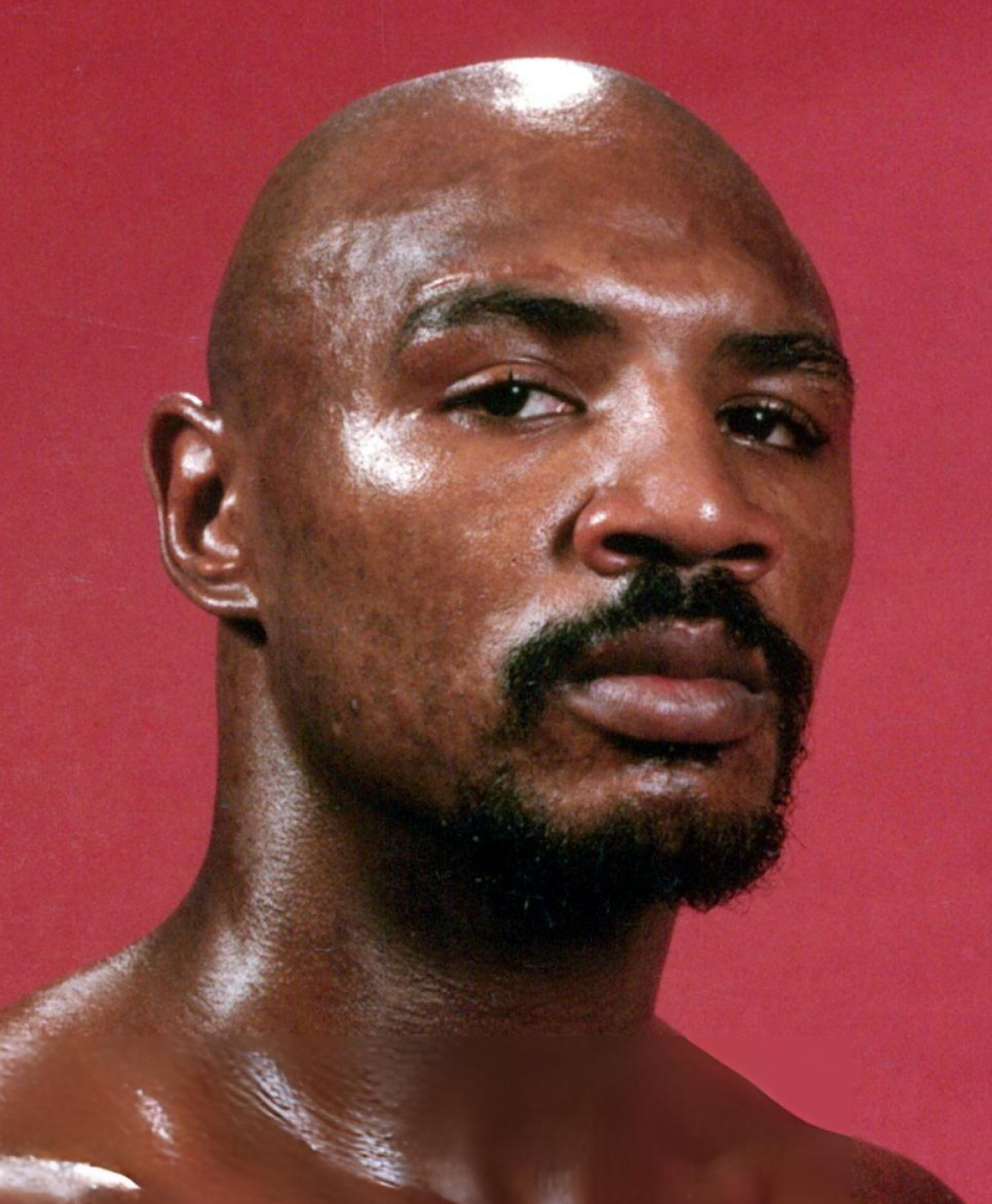
- Hagler in 1983

Personal information
- Born: Marvin Nathaniel Hagler; May 23, 1954 Newark, New Jersey, U.S.
- Died: March 13, 2021 (aged 66) Bartlett, New Hampshire, U.S.
- Height: 5 ft 10 in (178 cm)
- Weight: Middleweight

Boxing career
- Reach: 75 in (191 cm)
- Stance: Southpaw (Note: Listed by BoxRec as southpaw, but regularly switch-hits as an orthodox.)

Boxing record
- Total fights: 67
- Wins: 62
- Win by KO: 52
- Losses: 3
- Draws: 2
Medal record
Men's amateur boxing
U.S. National Championships
Gold medal – first place	1973 Boston	Middleweight

Marvelous Marvin Hagler (born Marvin Nathaniel Hagler; May 23, 1954 – March 13, 2021) was an American professional boxer who competed from 1973 to 1987. He reigned as the undisputed champion of the middleweight division from 1980 to 1987, making twelve successful title defenses, all but one by knockout. Hagler also holds the highest knockout percentage of all undisputed middleweight champions at 78 percent. His undisputed middleweight championship reign of six years and seven months is the second-longest active reign of the 20th century. He holds the record for the sixth longest reign as champion in middleweight history. Nicknamed "The Marv" and annoyed that network announcers often did not refer to him as "Marvelous", Hagler legally changed his name to "Marvelous Marvin Hagler" in 1982.

Hagler is an inductee of the International Boxing Hall of Fame and the World Boxing Hall of Fame. He was twice named Fighter of the Year by The Ring magazine and the Boxing Writers Association of America, as well as Fighter of the Decade (1980s) by Boxing Illustrated magazine. As of May 2026, BoxRec rates him the eighth greatest boxer of all time, pound for pound. In 2001 and 2004, The Ring named him the fourth greatest middleweight of all time and in 2002 named him the 17th greatest fighter of the past 69 years. The International Boxing Research Organization rates Hagler as the sixth greatest middleweight of all time. Many analysts and boxing writers consider Hagler to have one of the most durable chins in boxing history, having been knocked down only once during his entire professional career. The lone knockdown, scored by Juan Roldán of Argentina, was debatable.

== Early life, family and education ==
Hagler was the first child of Robert Sims and Ida Mae Hagler, born on May 23, 1954. His birth year publicly came to light in 1982, when he had to state his date of birth in order to legally change from Marvin Nathaniel Hagler to Marvelous Marvin Hagler. Hagler was raised by his mother in the Central Ward of Newark, New Jersey, United States along with five siblings: sisters Veronica, Cheryl, Genarra, and Noreen, and half brother Robbie Sims, who, like Hagler, would also become a professional boxer. Hagler first put on gloves at the age of ten, for a social worker he knew only as Mister Joe, who taught him sports and got him involved in counseling other children. Hagler dropped out of school at the age of 14 and worked in a toy factory to help support the family. Ida Mae recalled her eldest son had always wanted to box and promised one day to buy her a home. Growing up, Hagler would pretend he was Floyd Patterson or Emile Griffith.

Following the riots of 1967 in which 26 people were killed and $11 million in property damage was caused, including the destruction of the Haglers' tenement, his family moved to Brockton, Massachusetts. Hagler said that looking down on the streets at the looters was almost like watching ants on a picnic table. Ida Mae described the riots as "really terrifying" and nobody left the Hagler apartment for three days. The family lay under Veronica's bed during this time, with a pair of bullets smashing through the bedroom window, and shattering the plaster above the bed. Hagler and his siblings were forbidden from standing up by Ida Mae, who told her children to "stay away from the windows." The family crawled about the five-room apartment, sliding around on cushions to reach the bathroom and kitchen. Once the riot was over, the nearby neighborhoods were mostly in ruin, and many cars had been stripped for parts. After another riot nearly two years later, Hagler and his family got out of Newark and moved to Brockton, Massachusetts.

== Amateur career ==
In 1969, Hagler began boxing after being in a street fight with a local boxer called Dornell Wigfall (Wigfall accosted Hagler at a party and took him outside)—whom he later defeated twice on official fights—with his friends watching, and Wigfall easily beat Hagler and compounded the humiliation by stealing the jacket off Hagler's back. The day after the fight, Hagler determined to become a boxer himself. He first entered Vinnie Vecchione's gym (where, unknown to him, Dornell Wigfall trained), but after one week watching, and of nobody speaking to him, Hagler decided to leave for good. He walked into a gym owned by brothers Pat and Goody Petronelli. They became his trainers and managers. As Hagler needed to be 16 in order to enter some amateur tournaments, he lied about his age, saying that he was born in 1952 instead of 1954. In May 1973, Hagler won the National Amateur Athletic Union (AAU) 165-pound (75 kg) title after defeating Terry Dobbs, a U.S. Marine from Atlanta, Georgia. Ahead of both Aaron Pryor and Leon Spinks, officials also voted him the 'Outstanding Boxer' of the tournament. Hagler subsequently turned professional, finishing his amateur career with a 55–1 record.

National Golden Gloves (Light Middleweight), Lowell, Massachusetts, March 1973:

- 1/2: Lost to Dale Grant by decision

(gold) United States National Championships (Middleweight), Boston, Massachusetts, May 1973:

- Finals: Defeated Terry Dobbs by decision

== Professional career ==
=== Early career ===
Hagler was a top-ranked middleweight boxer for many years before he fought for the title. He struggled to find high-profile opponents willing to face him in his early years. Joe Frazier told Hagler, "You have three strikes against you, "You're black, you're a southpaw, and you're good." He often had to travel to his opponents' hometowns to get fights. His first break came when he was offered—on two weeks' notice—a chance against Willie "The Worm" Monroe, who was being trained by Frazier. Hagler lost the decision but the fight was close, so Monroe gave him a rematch. This time Hagler knocked out Monroe in twelve rounds. In a third fight, he defeated Monroe in two rounds.

Boston promoter Rip Valenti took an interest in Hagler and began bringing in top ranked opponents for Hagler to face. He fought 1972 Olympic gold medalist Sugar Ray Seales; Hagler won the first time, the second was a draw and Hagler knocked Seales out in the third fight. Number one ranked Mike Colbert was knocked out in the twelfth and also had his jaw broken by Hagler. Briton Kevin Finnegan was stopped in eight and required 40 facial stitches. He dropped a controversial decision to Bobby 'Boogaloo' Watts preceding those victories, but knocked Watts out in two rounds in a rematch. Hagler won a ten-round decision over 'Bad' Bennie Briscoe, which ultimately concluded his Spectrum expedition. By then, promoter Bob Arum took notice and signed him.

=== First title shot ===
In November 1979, Hagler fought world middleweight champion Vito Antuofermo at Caesars Palace in Las Vegas, Nevada. When the fight was over after 15 rounds, most ringside observers thought that Hagler had won, even though Antuofermo had been closing the gap in the second half of the fight. Hagler claimed that referee Mills Lane told him he had won, but Lane later denied ever saying that. Hagler also noted that he and many others at ringside were surprised when the fight decision was announced as a draw. Judge Duane Ford scored the fight in Hagler's favor, 145–141. However, judge Dalby Shirley scored the bout for Antuofermo, 144–142, while judge Hal Miller scored the fight even, 143–143. This fight result only added to Hagler's frustrations, as Antuofermo retained his title with the draw. Hagler had the boxing skills and killer instinct to knock his opponent out, but instead he played it safe, as Antuofermo closed the gap late in the fight, and that late surge cost Hagler the title.

=== World champion ===
Antuofermo later lost his title to British boxer Alan Minter, who gave Hagler his second title shot. Hagler went to Wembley Arena to face Minter. The tense atmosphere was stoked further when Minter was quoted as saying that "No black man is going to take my title"—Minter later insisted he meant "that black man". Hagler took command and his slashing punches soon opened up the cut-prone Minter. With Hagler dominating the action, referee Carlos Berrocal halted the fight during the third round to have the four glaring cuts on Minter's face examined. Minter's manager, Doug Bidwell, almost immediately conceded defeat. Once Berrocal waved the bout off, a riot broke out among the spectators. Clive Gammon of Sports Illustrated described the scene as "a horrifying ululation of howls and boos." Hagler and his trainers had to be escorted to their locker room by a phalanx of policemen, all the while enduring a steady rain of beer bottles and glasses. After seven years and 50 fights, Hagler was the world middleweight champion.

Hagler proved a busy world champion. He defeated future world champion Fulgencio Obelmejias of Venezuela by a knockout in eight rounds and then former world champ Antuofermo in a rematch by TKO in four rounds. Both matches were fought at the Boston Garden near Hagler's hometown, endearing him to Boston fight fans. Syrian born Mustafa Hamsho, who later defeated three-division world champion Wilfred Benítez and future world champion Bobby Czyz, became Hagler's next challenger, putting up a lot of resistance before finally succumbing in eleven tough rounds. Michigan fighter William "Caveman" Lee lasted only one round and in a rematch in Italy, Obelmejias lasted five rounds. British champion (and mutual Alan Minter conqueror) Tony Sibson followed on Hagler's ever-growing list of unsuccessful challengers. Sibson provided one of the most entertaining (to this point) fights of Marvelous Marvin's career, but he ultimately fell short, lasting six rounds. Next came Wilford Scypion, who only lasted four. By then, Hagler was a staple on HBO, one of the first premium cable TV channels.

=== Hagler vs. Durán ===
A fight against Roberto Durán followed on November 10, 1983. Durán was the first challenger to last the distance with Hagler in a world-championship bout. Durán was the WBA light middleweight champion and went up in weight to challenge for Hagler's middleweight crown. Hagler won a unanimous 15-round decision, although after 13 rounds, Durán was ahead by one point on two scorecards and even on the third. Hagler, with his left eye swollen and cut, came on strong in the last two rounds to win the fight. Judge Guy Jutras scored the bout 144–142. Judge Ove Ovesen scored it 144–143. Judge Yusaku Yoshida scored it 146–145.

=== More title defenses ===
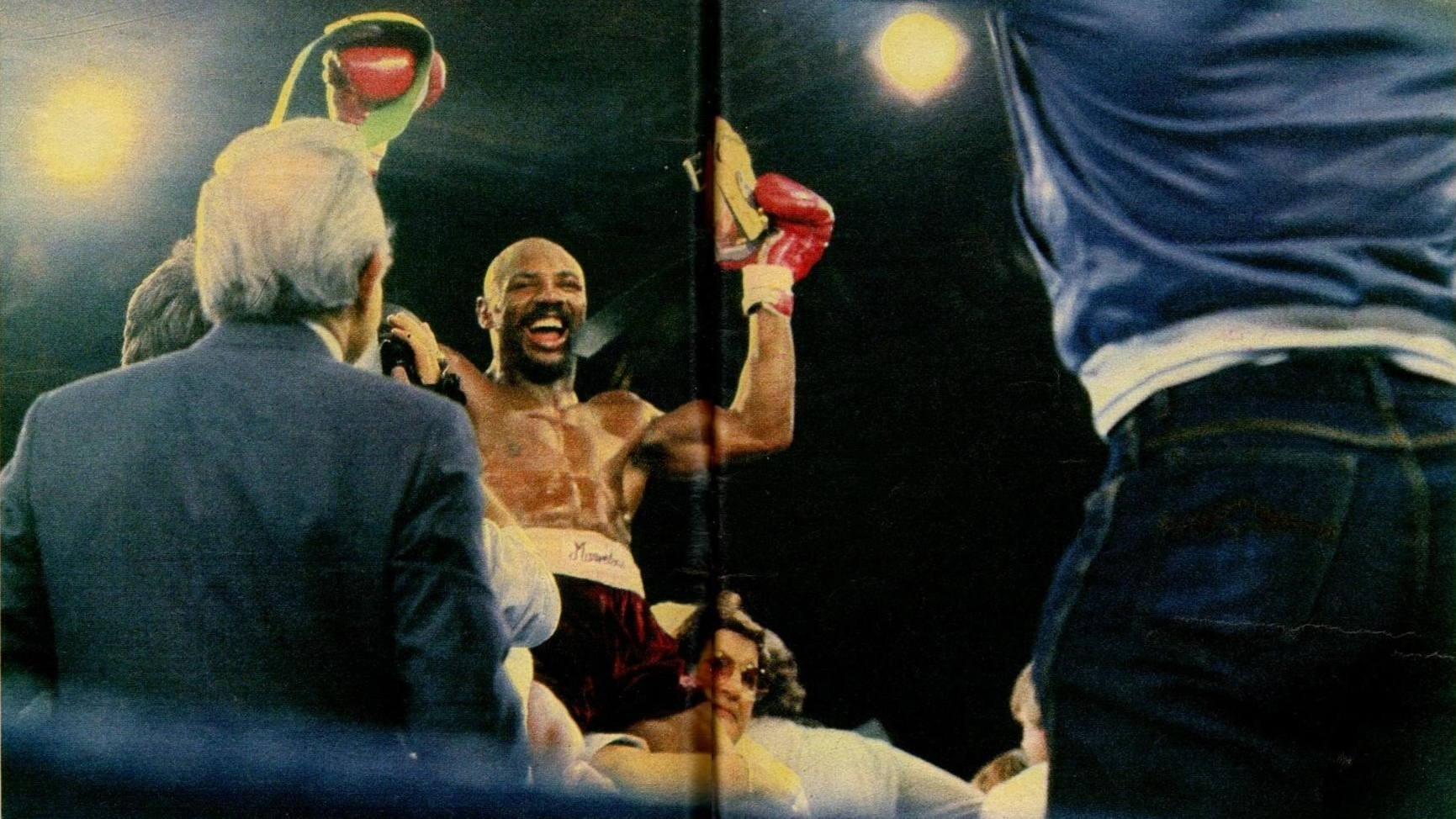
Hagler celebrating winning his fight against Juan Roldán

Then came Juan Roldán of Argentina, who became the only man to be credited with a knockdown of Hagler, scoring one mere seconds into the fight. Hagler protested bitterly that he had been pulled/pushed to the canvas. Hagler thumbed Roldán's left eye, then brutalized him over ten rounds and finally stopped him in the middle of round ten. Sugar Ray Leonard was calling the fight ringside with HBO analyst Barry Tompkins. He noted to Tompkins between rounds that Hagler looked older and slower. "Marvin might finally be slowing down, Barry," Leonard remarked. Many people believe this is the fight that gave Sugar Ray Leonard the idea that he could actually win a fight with the aging Hagler.

Hamsho was given a rematch, but the Syrian was again TKO'd, this time in only three rounds. Hamsho angered Hagler with a trio of intentional headbutts in the second round and a fourth early in the third, goading the normally patient and cautious Hagler into a full-out attack that left Hamsho battered and defenseless in a matter of seconds.

=== Hagler vs. Hearns ===
After conquering Hamsho again, Hagler met Thomas Hearns on April 15, 1985, in what was billed as The Fight; it became known as "The War".

Round One: Three minutes of violence. Within the first 15 seconds, Hearns landed his best punch, a straight right, onto Hagler's chin. The champion stepped back, then came forward. At this point, Hagler began to walk through Hearns' power punches.

Round Two: Hagler was cut on his head from an unintentional elbow or headbutt. Despite the blood, the champion continued to push the fight forward. Hearns was fighting hurt as well, having suffered a broken right hand in the last minute of the first round. The pace continued as before, but now Hearns was backing up, trying to move around the ring. Hearns' trainer Emanuel Steward later revealed Hearns had a leg massage, much to Steward's dismay, before the fight. Hearns' legs by the end of the round were weakening.

Round Three: The pace slowed until referee Richard Steele called a time out to have the ringside doctor examine the cut on Hagler's head. The crowd was on its feet for the next ten seconds, before the doctor allowed the fight to continue. Hagler charged the much taller Hearns, drilling in an overhand right behind Hearns' ear. Hearns' legs wobbled and Hagler was on him quickly. Hearns toppled to the canvas, then rose at the count of eight, but collapsed into referee Steele's arms. The fight was then halted.

The fight lasted only eight minutes and one second, but it was regarded as a classic. Commentator Al Michaels uttered the famous line, "It didn't go very far, but it was a beauty!" The fight was named "Fight of the Year" by The Ring.

=== Hagler vs. Mugabi ===
Next was Olympic silver medalist John Mugabi of Uganda, who was 26–0 with 26 knockouts and was ranked the number one contender by all three major bodies. The fight took place on March 10, 1986, as Hagler had hurt his back and could not fight on the first date booked in 1985. Hagler stopped Mugabi in the eleventh round of a brutal fight. Many ringside observers, including analyst Gil Clancy, noticed that Hagler was showing signs of advanced ring wear and age. He was much slower of hand and foot and seemed much easier to hit. He had also completely morphed his ring style from a slick, quick-fisted, boxer/puncher to a strictly flat-footed, stalking, slugger to compensate for his loss of speed and reflexes. Hagler was now said to be seriously considering retirement. Hagler's promoter Bob Arum was quoted as saying he was expecting Hagler to retire in the face of being challenged by Sugar Ray Leonard.

=== Hagler vs. Leonard ===
Hagler's next challenger was Sugar Ray Leonard, who was returning to the ring after a three-year retirement (having fought just once in the previous five years). During the pre-fight negotiations, in return for granting Hagler a larger share of the purse, Leonard obtained several conditions which were crucial to his strategy: a 22-by-22-foot (6.7 m × 6.7 m) ring instead of a smaller ring, 10-ounce (280-gram) gloves instead of 8-ounce (230-gram) gloves, and the fight was to be over twelve rounds instead of the 15 rounds favoured by Hagler. Leonard was two years younger, had half as many fights and unbeknownst to Hagler, had engaged in several 'real' (i.e. gloves, rounds, a referee, judges and no headgear) fights behind closed doors in order to shake off his ring rust. The fight took place at Caesars Palace in Las Vegas on April 6, 1987. Hagler was the clear betting favorite after a dominant six and a half years as the reigning undisputed middleweight champion of the world, having knocked out all opponents as champion except in winning a very close unanimous decision over 15 rounds against Roberto Durán. It was Leonard's first fight at middleweight (160 lb or 73 kg weight limit). The fight was to be for Hagler's WBC, lineal and Ring middleweight titles only, as the WBA stripped Hagler of their belt for choosing to face Leonard instead of WBA mandatory challenger Herol Graham. The IBF, while keeping Hagler as their champion, refused to sanction his fight against Leonard and said that the IBF middleweight title would be declared vacant if Hagler lost to Leonard.

Hagler, a natural southpaw, opened the fight boxing out of an orthodox stance. After the quick and slick Leonard won the first two rounds on all three scorecards, Hagler started the third round as a southpaw. Hagler then did much better, though Leonard's superior speed and quick flurries kept him in the fight. But by the fifth, Leonard, who was moving a lot, began to tire and Hagler started to get closer. As Leonard tired he began to clinch with more frequency (in total referee Richard Steele gave him over 30 warnings for holding, although never deducted a point). Hagler buckled Leonard's knees with a right uppercut near the end of the round, which finished with Leonard on the ropes. Hagler continued to score effectively in round six. Leonard, having slowed down, was obliged to fight more and run less.

In rounds seven and eight, Hagler's southpaw jab was landing solidly and Leonard's counter flurries were less frequent. Round nine was the most exciting round of the fight. Hagler hurt Leonard with a left cross and pinned him in a corner. Leonard was in trouble, then furiously tried to fight his way out of the corner. The action see-sawed for the rest of the round, with each man having his moments. Round ten was calmer even as Hagler continued to press forward and Leonard slowly got a second wind, as the pace slowed after the furious action of the previous round. Clearly tiring, Leonard boxed well in the eleventh. Every time Hagler scored, Leonard came back with something flashier, if not as effective. In the final round, Hagler continued to chase Leonard. He hit Leonard with a big left hand and backed him into a corner. Leonard responded with a flurry and danced away with Hagler in pursuit. The fight ended with Hagler and Leonard exchanging along the ropes. Hagler began dancing in celebration of his performance while Leonard collapsed to the canvas and raised both his arms in triumph. Leonard threw 629 punches and landed 306, while Hagler threw 792 and landed 291.

Hagler later said that, as the fighters embraced in the ring after the fight, Leonard said to him, "You beat me, man." Hagler said after the fight, "He said I beat him and I was so happy." Leonard denied making the statement and said he only told Hagler, "You're a great champion." HBO cameras and microphones supported Hagler's version of events.

Leonard was announced as the winner and new middleweight champion of the world by split decision (118–110, 115–113, 113–115), a result which remains hotly disputed to this day. The Hagler vs. Leonard fight divides fans, pundits, press and ringside observers arguably more than any other fight in boxing history, with scorecards varying as widely as 117–111 Hagler to 118–110 Leonard and everything in between. The only near universally agreed views about the fight are that Hagler was foolish for starting the fight in an orthodox stance, that Leonard won the first two rounds and that Hagler won the fifth round. Every other round in the fight divides people as to who actually won it, or if the rounds were even.

==== Post-fight reaction ====
Official ringside judge JoJo Guerra, whose scorecard of 118–110 in favour of Leonard was derided in many quarters, commented that:

Leonard outpunched Hagler, outsmarted him, outboxed him. He looked just great. Sugar Ray Leonard was making him miss a lot, and then counterpunching him. Sugar Ray Leonard was beating him to the punch. They should call him Marvelous Sugar Ray Leonard. Boxing is the art of self-defense, and Sugar Ray was in command at all times. He was very fast and he was very clever. He made Marvin Hagler come to him. He dictated the fight.

Upon a second viewing of the fight, while maintaining his belief that Leonard won the fight, Guerra acknowledged that he made a mistake and should have scored two more rounds for Hagler. Duane Ford, chairman of the Nevada Athletic Commission, commented that Guerra probably would not be invited back to Las Vegas to judge a fight in the near future.

Judge Dave Moretti, who scored it 115–113 for Leonard, said:

Obviously, Hagler was the aggressor, but he was not the effective aggressor. You can't chase and get hit and chase and get hit, and get credit for it. Besides, the hardest punching was by Leonard.

Judge Lou Filippo, who scored it 115–113 for Hagler and felt that Hagler's bodyshots and aggression earned him the nod, said:

Hagler was doing all the work. The referee, Richard Steele, warned Leonard at least once every round about holding. Leonard fought in spurts. Leonard would run in and grab and hold. He did what he had to do. But I can't see a guy holding that much and getting points for it.

Hugh McIlvanney, commenting in the British Sunday Times and Sports Illustrated:

What Ray Leonard pulled off in his split decision over Hagler was an epic illusion. He had said beforehand that the way to beat Hagler was to give him a distorted picture. But this shrewdest of fighters knew it was even more important to distort the picture for the judges. His plan was to "steal" rounds with a few flashy and carefully timed flurries and to make the rest of each three-minute session as unproductive as possible for Hagler by circling briskly away from the latter's persistent pursuit. When he made his sporadic attacking flourishes, he was happy to exaggerate hand speed at the expense of power, and neither he nor two of the scorers seemed bothered by the fact that many of the punches landed on the champion's gloves and arms.

McIlvanney also referred to Budd Schulberg's contention about a 'compound optical illusion', namely that by being the underdog and more competitive than expected against the dominant undisputed champion in Hagler meant that Leonard appeared more effective and to be doing more than he actually was. Leonard himself had said to journalists before the fight "the reason I will win is because you don't think I can". Harry Gibbs, the British judge who had been rejected by Pat Petronelli from Hagler's camp and replaced by JoJo Guerra, said he scored it 115–113 for Hagler when he watched the fight at home.

Jim Murray, long-time sports columnist for the Los Angeles Times felt that Leonard deservedly got the decision, arguing that Leonard showed better defense and ring generalship, landed more punches and writing:

It wasn't even close...He didn't just outpoint Hagler, he exposed him. He made him look like a guy chasing a bus, in snowshoes. Leonard repeatedly beat Hagler to the punch. When he did, he hit harder. He hit more often. He made Hagler into what he perceived him to be throughout his career—a brawler, a swarmer, a man who could club you to death only if you stood there and let him. If you moved, he was lost.

The scorecards from the ringside press and broadcast media attest to the polarizing views and opinions of the fight (17 for Leonard, 18 for Hagler, 6 calling it a draw):

- ABC (Howard Cosell): 117–112 Leonard
- Associated Press: 117–112 Hagler
- Baltimore Sun: 7–5 Leonard (115–113 Leonard)
- Boston Globe (Ron Borges): 115–113 Hagler
- Boston Globe (Steve Marantz): 117–111 Leonard
- Boston Herald: 116–113 Leonard
- CBS (Gil Clancy): 115–113 Leonard
- CBS (Tim Ryan): 115–114 Hagler
- Chicago Sun-Times: 115–114 Hagler
- Chicago Tribune (1 – Bob Verdi): 115–113 Hagler
- Chicago Tribune (2 – Bernie Lincicome): 115–113 Hagler
- Chicago Tribune (3 – Sam Smith): 115–113 Hagler
- ESPN (Al Bernstein): 115–113 Hagler
- ESPN (Dave Bontempo): 114–114
- HBO (Harold Lederman): 115–113 Leonard
- HBO (Larry Merchant): 114–114
- Houston Chronicle: 115–114 Leonard
- KO Magazine: 118–111 Leonard
- Los Angeles Times: 117–111 Leonard
- Miami Herald: 116–112 Hagler
- Miami News: 116–112 Hagler
- Newsday: 115–114 Hagler
- New York Daily News (1): 117–111 Leonard
- New York Daily News (2 – Michael Katz): 117–112 Leonard
- New York Post (1): 114–114
- New York Post (2 – Jerry Lisker): 115–113 Hagler
- New York Times (Dave Anderson): 114–114
- Newark Star-Ledger (Jerry Izenberg): 115–113 Hagler
- Oakland Tribune: 117–112 Leonard
- Philadelphia Daily News (1): 116–112 Leonard
- Philadelphia Daily News (2): 115–113 Hagler
- The Ring (Nigel Collins): 115–113 Leonard
- The Ring (Phill Marder): 114–114
- San Jose Mercury-News: 116–115 Hagler
- Seattle Times: 115–113 Hagler
- Sports Illustrated (Hugh McIlvanney): 116–112 Hagler
- Sports Illustrated (Pat Putnam): 115–113 Hagler
- Sports Illustrated (William Nack): 116–114 Leonard
- United Press International: 116–112 Leonard
- USA Today: 115–113 Leonard
- The Washington Post: 114–114

==== Rematch ====
Hagler requested a rematch but Leonard chose to retire again (the third of five high-profile retirements announced by Leonard during his professional boxing career), having announced it beforehand. Fourteen months following their fight, Hagler retired from boxing on June 13, 1988, after watching WBA middleweight champion Sumbu Kalambay prevail over his brother, Robbie Sims, via unanimous decision. Hagler declared that he was "tired of waiting" for Leonard to grant him a rematch. Just a month succeeding Hagler's retirement, Leonard announced another boxing comeback to fight against WBC light heavyweight champion Donny Lalonde at the 168-pound (76 kg) super middleweight limit. In 1990, Leonard finally offered Hagler a rematch which reportedly would have earned him $15 million, but he declined. By then, Hagler had settled down into a new life as an actor in Italy and was now uninterested in his past boxing life. Hagler said "A while ago, yeah, I wanted him so bad, but I'm over that." At the 1994 Consumer Electronics Show, Hagler and Leonard had a mock rematch by playing against each other in the video game Boxing Legends of the Ring and claimed that an actual rematch was being planned, though it never happened.

== Life after boxing ==
After the loss to Leonard, Hagler moved to Italy, where he became a well-known star of action films. His roles included a U.S. Marine in the films Indio (1989) and Indio 2 (1991). In 1997, he starred alongside Terence Hill and Giselle Blondet in Virtual Weapon. Hagler also provided boxing commentary for British television. Another foray by Hagler into the entertainment field included work on the video game Fight Night: Round 3.

== Personal life ==
Hagler had five children with his first wife, Bertha. Although he owned a home in Bartlett, New Hampshire, Hagler lived in Milan. In May 2000, he married his second wife, Kay, an Italian, in Pioltello, Italy.

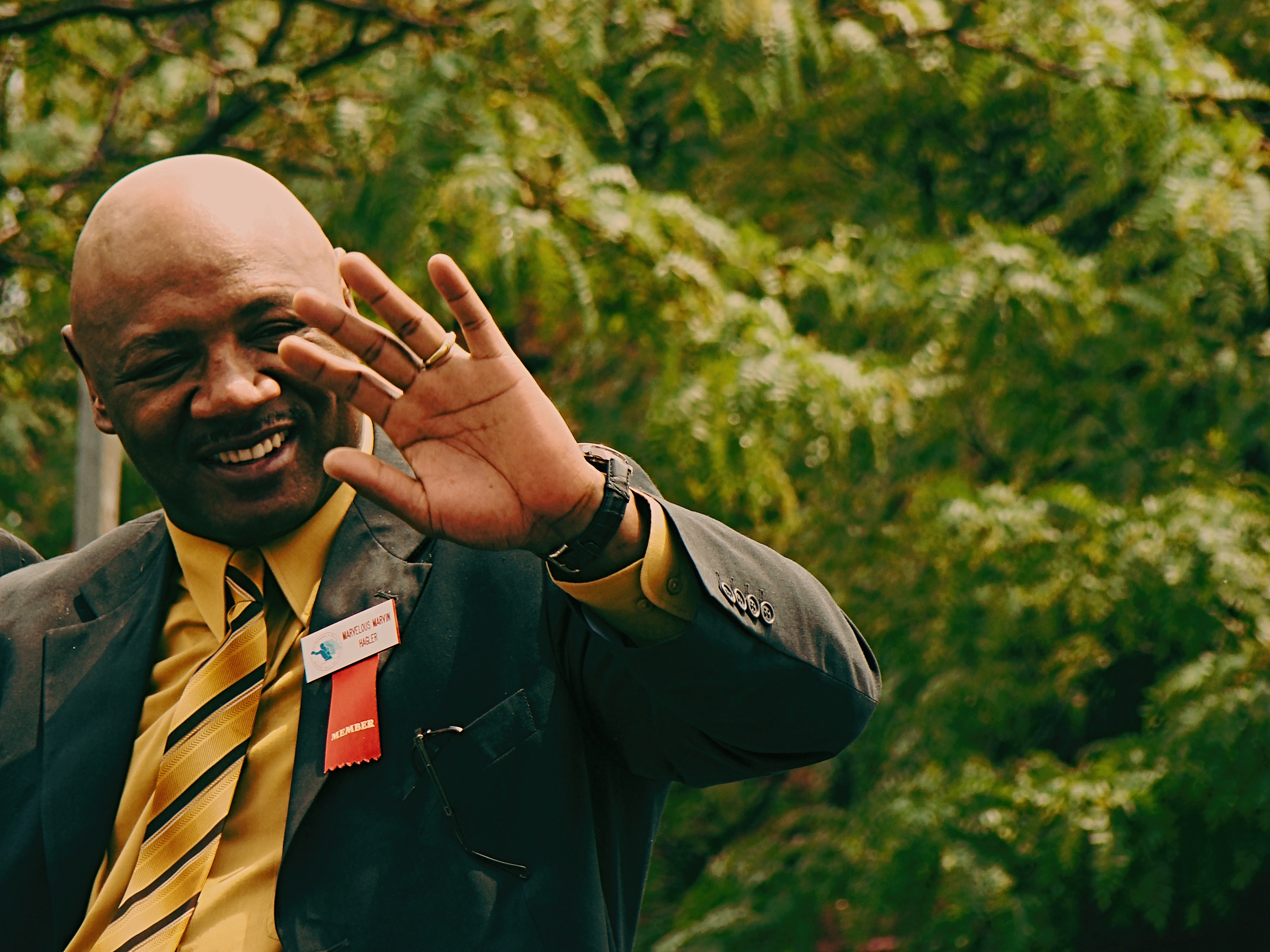
Hagler attending Parade of Champions at the International Boxing Hall of Fame in 2008

== Death ==
On March 13, 2021, Hagler's wife, Kay, announced that he had died of natural causes at his home in New Hampshire at the age of 66. His son James said his father was taken to a New Hampshire hospital after experiencing chest pains and difficulty breathing.

Honoring and respecting what Hagler would have wanted, his widow, Kay, stated that his family was not thinking about organizing a funeral as ”Marvin hated funerals”.

Following his death, a public memorial was held in Brockton, Massachusetts, at Rocky Marciano Stadium. The event was limited to a capacity of 3,000 people, and speeches were given by Bernard Hopkins, Stephen A. Smith, Al Bernstein, and various members of the Hagler family. Mickey Ward and Vinny Pazienza were also in attendance. During the event, Governor Charlie Baker proclaimed May 23, 2021 as Marvelous Marvin Hagler Day in the city and the entire state of Massachusetts; the proclamation was read aloud at the event.

Many tributes came in from numerous celebrities and members of the boxing community such as Oscar De La Hoya, Barry McGuigan, and Sugar Ray Leonard.

== Legacy ==
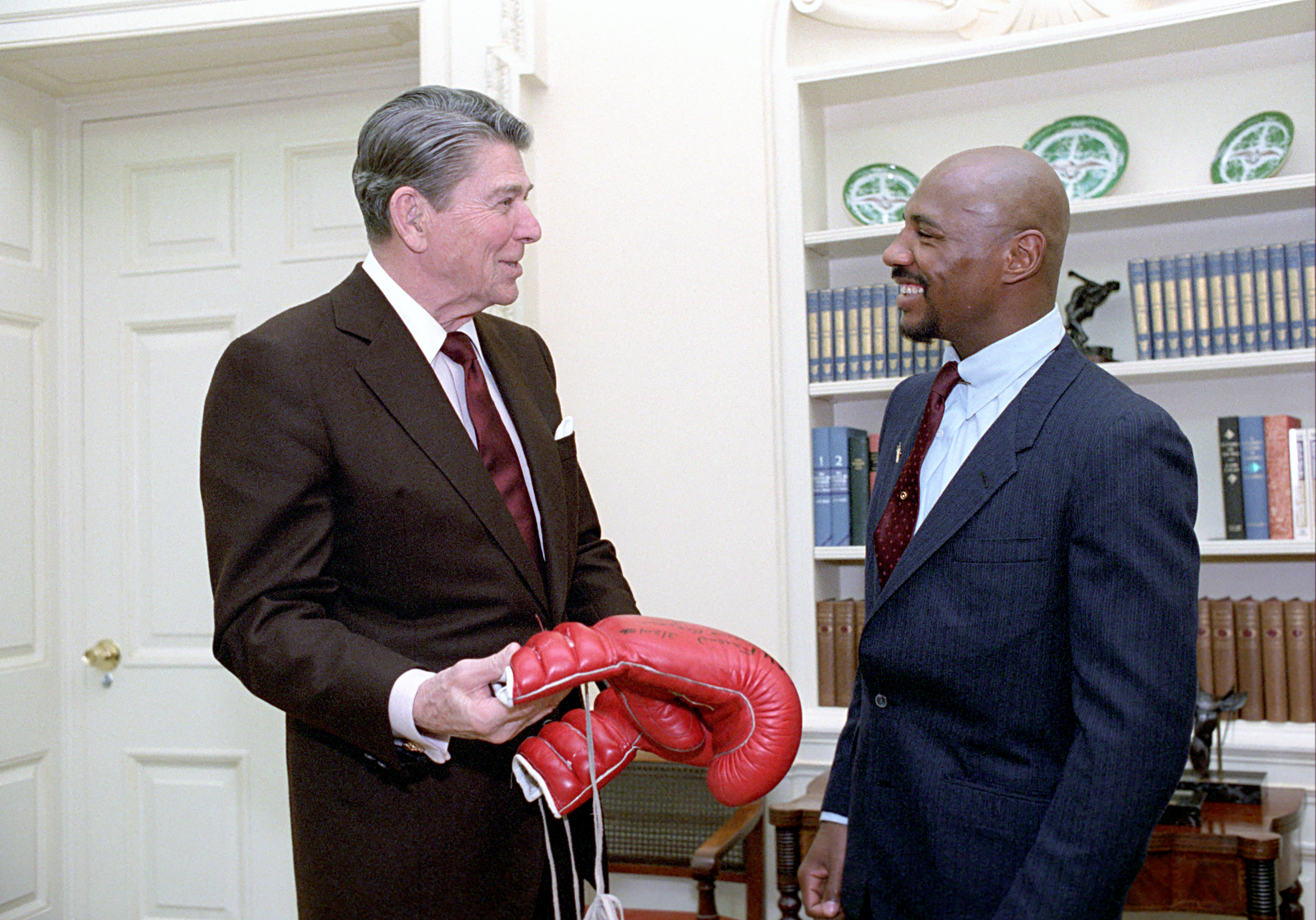
Hagler visiting President Ronald Reagan at the White House in 1986

Hagler is often referred to as one of the greatest middleweights in boxing history, The Associated Press named him the 3rd greatest middleweight of the 20th century. He is also viewed as one of the most relentless and disciplined champions, his undisputed middleweight championship reign from 1980 to 1987 was the second-longest active reign of the 20th century and the sixth-longest in middleweight history. Hagler also holds the highest knockout percentage of all undisputed middleweight champions at 78 percent. In 2002 The Ring named Hagler the 17th greatest fighter of the past 80 years and In 2004 they named him the 4th greatest middleweight of all-time, also being ranked as the 35th greatest puncher of all time. In 2005 his reign as middleweight champion was named the 7th greatest reign of all time by The Ring.

Hagler was a part of “the four kings of boxing” alongside Ray Leonard, Thomas Hearns and Roberto Duran a period when those 4 who represented “the last great era in boxing” and fought one another several times while crossing their paths. His bout vs Hearns is often considered to be the greatest three rounds in boxing history, with the first round in particular being considered by many as one of the greatest rounds in boxing history.

Teddy Atlas described Hagler as "one of the greatest middleweights ever and one of the greatest southpaws of all time."

Brockton High School's sports teams are nicknamed "the boxers" in honor of both Hagler and Rocky Marciano, the two have also led the city to develop the nickname "The City of Champions". On June 13, 2024, the city of Brockton unveiled a bronze statue in his honor. The statue is located in Marvelous Marvin Hagler Park which was also dedicated to him.

== Professional boxing record ==
67 fights	62 wins	3 losses
By knockout	52	0
By decision	9	3
By disqualification	1	0
Draws	2	

No.	Result	Record	Opponent	Type	Round, time	Date	Location	Notes
67	Loss	62–3–2	Sugar Ray Leonard	SD	12	Apr 6, 1987	Caesars Palace, Paradise, Nevada, U.S.	Lost WBC and The Ring middleweight titles
66	Win	62–2–2	John Mugabi	KO	11 (12), 1:29	Mar 10, 1986	Caesars Palace, Paradise, Nevada, U.S.	Retained WBA, WBC, IBF, and The Ring middleweight titles
65	Win	61–2–2	Thomas Hearns	TKO	3 (12), 1:52	Apr 15, 1985	Caesars Palace, Paradise, Nevada, U.S.	Retained WBA, WBC, IBF, and The Ring middleweight titles
64	Win	60–2–2	Mustafa Hamsho	TKO	3 (15), 2:31	Oct 19, 1984	Madison Square Garden, New York City, New York, U.S.	Retained WBA, WBC, IBF, and The Ring middleweight titles
63	Win	59–2–2	Juan Roldán	TKO	10 (15), 0:39	Mar 30, 1984	Riviera, Winchester, Nevada, U.S.	Retained WBA, WBC, IBF, and The Ring middleweight titles
62	Win	58–2–2	Roberto Durán	UD	15	Nov 10, 1983	Caesars Palace, Paradise, Nevada, U.S.	Retained WBA, WBC, IBF, and The Ring middleweight titles
61	Win	57–2–2	Wilford Scypion	KO	4 (15), 2:47	May 27, 1983	Civic Center, Providence, Rhode Island, U.S.	Retained The Ring middleweight title; Won inaugural IBF middleweight title
60	Win	56–2–2	Tony Sibson	TKO	6 (15), 2:40	Feb 11, 1983	Centrum, Worcester, Massachusetts, U.S.	Retained WBA, WBC, and The Ring middleweight titles
59	Win	55–2–2	Fulgencio Obelmejias	TKO	5 (15), 2:35	Oct 30, 1982	Teatro Ariston, Sanremo, Italy	Retained WBA, WBC, and The Ring middleweight titles
58	Win	54–2–2	William Lee	TKO	1 (15), 1:07	Mar 7, 1982	Bally's Park Place, Atlantic City, New Jersey, U.S.	Retained WBA, WBC, and The Ring middleweight titles
57	Win	53–2–2	Mustafa Hamsho	TKO	11 (15), 2:09	Oct 3, 1981	Horizon, Rosemont, Illinois, U.S.	Retained WBA, WBC, and The Ring middleweight titles
56	Win	52–2–2	Vito Antuofermo	RTD	4 (15), 3:00	Jun 13, 1981	Boston Garden, Boston, Massachusetts, U.S.	Retained WBA, WBC, and The Ring middleweight titles
55	Win	51–2–2	Fulgencio Obelmejias	TKO	8 (15), 0:20	Jan 17, 1981	Boston Garden, Boston, Massachusetts, U.S.	Retained WBA, WBC, and The Ring middleweight titles
54	Win	50–2–2	Alan Minter	TKO	3 (15), 1:45	Sep 27, 1980	Wembley Arena, London, England	Won WBA, WBC, and The Ring middleweight titles
53	Win	49–2–2	Marcos Geraldo	UD	10	May 17, 1980	Caesars Palace, Paradise, Nevada, U.S.	
52	Win	48–2–2	Bobby Watts	TKO	2 (10)	Apr 19, 1980	Cumberland County Civic Center, Portland, Maine, U.S.	
51	Win	47–2–2	Loucif Hamani	KO	2 (10), 1:42	Feb 16, 1980	Cumberland County Civic Center, Portland, Maine, U.S.	
50	Draw	46–2–2	Vito Antuofermo	SD	15	Nov 30, 1979	Caesars Palace, Paradise, Nevada, U.S.	For WBA, WBC, and The Ring middleweight titles
49	Win	46–2–1	Norberto Rufino Cabrera	TKO	8 (10)	Jun 30, 1979	Esplanade de Fontvieille, Monte Carlo, Monaco	
48	Win	45–2–1	Jamie Thomas	TKO	3 (10), 2:38	May 26, 1979	Cumberland County Civic Center, Portland, Maine, U.S.	
47	Win	44–2–1	Bob Patterson	TKO	3 (10), 1:00	Mar 12, 1979	Civic Center, Providence, Rhode Island, U.S.	
46	Win	43–2–1	Sugar Ray Seales	TKO	1 (10), 1:26	Feb 3, 1979	Boston Garden, Boston, Massachusetts, U.S.	
45	Win	42–2–1	Willie Warren	TKO	7 (10)	Nov 11, 1978	Boston Garden, Boston, Massachusetts, U.S.	
44	Win	41–2–1	Bennie Briscoe	UD	10	Aug 24, 1978	Spectrum, Philadelphia, Pennsylvania, U.S.	
43	Win	40–2–1	Kevin Finnegan	TKO	7 (10)	May 13, 1978	Boston Garden, Boston, Massachusetts, U.S.	
42	Win	39–2–1	Doug Demmings	TKO	8 (10)	Apr 7, 1978	Grand Olympic Auditorium, Los Angeles, California, U.S.	
41	Win	38–2–1	Kevin Finnegan	TKO	9 (10)	Mar 4, 1978	Boston Garden, Boston, Massachusetts, U.S.	
40	Win	37–2–1	Mike Colbert	TKO	12 (15)	Nov 26, 1977	Boston Garden, Boston, Massachusetts, U.S.	Won vacant Massachusetts middleweight title
39	Win	36–2–1	Jim Henry	UD	10	Oct 15, 1977	Marvel Gymnasium, Providence, Rhode Island, U.S.	
38	Win	35–2–1	Ray Phillips	TKO	7 (10), 1:11	Sep 24, 1977	Boston Garden, Boston, Massachusetts, U.S.	
37	Win	34–2–1	Willie Monroe	TKO	2 (10), 1:46	Aug 23, 1977	Spectrum, Philadelphia, Pennsylvania, U.S.	Won vacant North American middleweight title
36	Win	33–2–1	Roy Jones Sr.	TKO	3 (10), 2:10	Jun 10, 1977	Civic Center, Hartford, Connecticut, U.S.	
35	Win	32–2–1	Reggie Ford	KO	3 (10), 2:14	Mar 16, 1977	Boston Arena, Boston, Massachusetts, U.S.	
34	Win	31–2–1	Willie Monroe	TKO	12 (12), 1:20	Feb 15, 1977	John B. Hynes Memorial Auditorium, Boston, Massachusetts, U.S.	
33	Win	30–2–1	George Davis	TKO	6 (10), 2:56	Dec 21, 1976	John B. Hynes Memorial Auditorium, Boston, Massachusetts, U.S.	
32	Win	29–2–1	Eugene Hart	RTD	8 (10)	Sep 14, 1976	Spectrum, Philadelphia, Pennsylvania, U.S.	
31	Win	28–2–1	DC Walker	TKO	6 (10)	Aug 3, 1976	Schneider Arena, North Providence, Rhode Island, U.S.	
30	Win	27–2–1	Bob Smith	TKO	5 (10), 2:05	Jun 2, 1976	Roseland Ballroom, Taunton, Massachusetts, U.S.	
29	Loss	26–2–1	Willie Monroe	UD	10	Mar 9, 1976	Spectrum, Philadelphia, Pennsylvania, U.S.	
28	Win	26–1–1	Matt Donovan	TKO	2 (10), 2:40	Feb 7, 1976	Boston Arena, Boston, Massachusetts, U.S.	
27	Loss	25–1–1	Bobby Watts	MD	10	Jan 13, 1976	Spectrum, Philadelphia, Pennsylvania, U.S.	
26	Win	25–0–1	Johnny Baldwin	UD	10	Dec 20, 1975	John B. Hynes Memorial Auditorium, Boston, Massachusetts, U.S.	
25	Win	24–0–1	Lamont Lovelady	TKO	7 (10)	Sep 30, 1975	Boston Garden, Boston, Massachusetts, U.S.	
24	Win	23–0–1	Jesse Bender	KO	1 (10), 1:38	Aug 7, 1975	Exposition Building, Portland, Maine, U.S.	
23	Win	22–0–1	Jimmy Owens	DQ	6 (10)	May 24, 1975	Brockton High School Gymnasium, Brockton, Massachusetts, U.S.	Owens disqualified for repeated clinching
22	Win	21–0–1	Jimmy Owens	SD	10	Apr 14, 1975	Boston Arena, Boston, Massachusetts, U.S.	
21	Win	20–0–1	Joey Blair	KO	2 (10), 2:22	Mar 31, 1975	Harvard Club, Boston, Massachusetts, U.S.	
20	Win	19–0–1	Dornell Wigfall	KO	6 (10), 1:25	Feb 15, 1975	Brockton High School Gymnasium, Brockton, Massachusetts, U.S.	
19	Win	18–0–1	DC Walker	TKO	2 (10), 2:58	Dec 20, 1974	Boston Garden, Boston, Massachusetts, U.S.	
18	Draw	17–0–1	Sugar Ray Seales	MD	10	Nov 26, 1974	Center Coliseum, Seattle, Washington, U.S.	
17	Win	17–0	George Green	KO	1 (10), 0:30	Nov 16, 1974	Brockton High School Gymnasium, Brockton, Massachusetts, U.S.	
16	Win	16–0	Morris Jordan	TKO	4 (10), 2:20	Oct 29, 1974	Brockton High School Gymnasium, Brockton, Massachusetts, U.S.	
15	Win	15–0	Sugar Ray Seales	UD	10	Aug 30, 1974	WNAC-TV Studio, Boston, Massachusetts, U.S.	
14	Win	14–0	Peachy Davis	KO	1 (10), 1:00	Aug 13, 1974	Sargent Field, New Bedford, Massachusetts, U.S.	
13	Win	13–0	Bobby Williams	TKO	3 (10), 1:11	Jul 16, 1974	Boston Arena, Boston, Massachusetts, U.S.	
12	Win	12–0	Curtis Phillips	TKO	5 (10)	May 30, 1974	Exposition Building, Portland, Maine, U.S.	
11	Win	11–0	James Redford	TKO	2 (10)	May 4, 1974	Brockton High School Gymnasium, Brockton, Massachusetts, U.S.	
10	Win	10–0	Tracy Morrison	TKO	8 (10), 2:04	Apr 5, 1974	WNAC-TV Studio, Boston, Massachusetts, U.S.	
9	Win	9–0	Bob Harrington	KO	5 (10), 2:00	Feb 5, 1974	Boston Garden, Boston, Massachusetts, U.S.	
8	Win	8–0	James Redford	KO	4 (8)	Dec 18, 1973	John B. Hynes Memorial Auditorium, Boston, Massachusetts, U.S.	
7	Win	7–0	Manny Freitas	TKO	1 (8), 1:33	Dec 6, 1973	Exposition Building, Portland, Maine, U.S.	
6	Win	6–0	Cocoa Kid	KO	2 (8)	Nov 17, 1973	Brockton, Massachusetts, U.S.	
5	Win	5–0	Cove Green	TKO	4 (8), 1:27	Oct 26, 1973	Brockton High School Gymnasium, Brockton, Massachusetts, U.S.	
4	Win	4–0	Dornell Wigfall	PTS	8	Oct 6, 1973	Brockton High School Gymnasium, Brockton, Massachusetts, U.S.	
3	Win	3–0	Muhammed Smith	KO	2 (6)	Aug 8, 1973	Boston Arena, Boston, Massachusetts, U.S.	
2	Win	2–0	Sonny Williams	UD	6	Jul 25, 1973	Boston Arena, Boston, Massachusetts, U.S.	
1	Win	1–0	Terry Ryan	KO	2 (4)	May 18, 1973	Brockton High School Gymnasium, Brockton, Massachusetts, U.S.	

== Titles in boxing ==
=== Major world titles ===
- WBA middleweight champion (160 lbs)
- WBC middleweight champion (160 lbs)
- IBF middleweight champion (Note: Won inaugural title on May 27, 1983.) (160 lbs)

=== The Ring magazine titles ===
- The Ring middleweight champion (160 lbs)

=== Regional/International titles ===
- North American middleweight champion (160 lbs)
- Massachusetts middleweight champion (160 lbs)

=== Undisputed titles ===
- Undisputed middleweight champion

== Awards and recognitions ==
- Receives Outstanding Fighter Award at the 1973 United States National Amateur Championships
- Named Fighter of the Decade (1980s) by Boxing Illustrated
- Named Boxing Writers Association of America Fighter of the Year for 1983 and 1985
- Named The Ring Fighter of the Year for 1983 and 1985
- Received the Jackie Robinson Award for Athletes in 1985
- The Ring Fight of the Year in 1985 vs. Thomas Hearns and 1987 vs. Sugar Ray Leonard
- Inducted into the World Boxing Hall of Fame, Class of 1992
- Inducted into the International Boxing Hall of Fame, Class of 1993
- Inducted into the New Jersey Boxing Hall of Fame, Class of 2013
- Inducted into the Nevada Boxing Hall of Fame, Class of 2015
- Awarded the Excellence Guirlande D'Honneur and was entered in the FICTS Hall Of Fame during the 2016 edition of "Sport Movies & TV – Milano International FICTS Fest"
- Brockton city park and statue dedicated in his honor, June 2024

== Filmography ==
=== Film ===
Year	Film	Role	Note
1989	Indio	Jake Iron	
1991	Indio 2: The Revolt	Jake Iron	
1991	Across Red Nights	Man For Cuba	
1997	Virtual Weapon	Mike	
2021	What Goes Around Comes Around	Himself	

=== Television ===
Year	Show	Role	Note
1985	Punky Brewster	Himself	1 episode
1985	Good Morning America	Guest	1 episode
1985	Late Night with David Letterman	Guest	1 episode
1985–1987	The Tonight Show Starring Johnny Carson	Guest	4 episodes
1986	Saturday Night live	Himself	1 episode
1988	227	Himself	1 episode
2001–2003	A Question of Sport	Guest	3 episodes

=== Video games ===
Year	Game	Role
1993	Boxing Legends of the Ring	Playable character
1998	Knockout Kings 99	Playable character
1999	Knockout Kings 2000	Playable character
2000	Knockout Kings 2001	Playable character
2002	Knockout Kings 2002	Playable character
2003	Knockout kings 2003	Playable character
2006	Fight Night Round 3	Playable character
2009	Fight Night Round 4	Playable character

=== Music videos ===
Year	Song	Artist	Role
1985	I'm Fighter	Van Zant	Himself

== See also ==
- List of undisputed boxing champions
- List of middleweight boxing champions
- List of The Ring world champions
- List of WBA world champions
- List of WBC world champions
- List of IBF world champions
- List of left-handed boxers
- List of people from Newark, New Jersey

== Notes ==
Sporting positions
Amateur boxing titles
Previous: Mike Colbert	U.S. middleweight champion 1973	Next: Vonzell Johnson
World boxing titles
Preceded by Alan Minter	WBA middleweight champion September 27, 1980 – February 25, 1987; Stripped	Vacant Title next held by Sumbu Kalambay
Preceded by Alan Minter	WBC middleweight champion September 27, 1980 – April 6, 1987	Succeeded by Sugar Ray Leonard
Preceded by Alan Minter	The Ring middleweight champion September 27, 1980 – April 6, 1987	Succeeded by Sugar Ray Leonard
Preceded by Alan Minter	Undisputed middleweight champion September 27, 1980 – February 25, 1987; Titles fragmented	Vacant Title next held by Bernard Hopkins
Inaugural champion	IBF middleweight champion May 27, 1983 – April 6, 1987; Stripped	Vacant Title next held by Frank Tate
Awards
Previous: Larry Holmes	The Ring Fighter of the Year; 1983	Next: Thomas Hearns
Previous: Aaron Pryor	BWAA Fighter of the Year; 1983	Next: Thomas Hearns
Previous: Thomas Hearns	The Ring Fighter of the Year; 1985; With: Donald Curry	Next: Mike Tyson
Previous: Thomas Hearns	BWAA Fighter of the Year; 1985	Next: Mike Tyson
Previous: José Luis Ramírez vs. Edwin Rosario II	The Ring Fight of the Year vs. Thomas Hearns; 1985	Next: Steve Cruz vs. Barry McGuigan
Previous: Juan Meza vs. Jaime Garza; Round 1	The Ring Round of the Year vs. Thomas Hearns; Round 1; 1985	Next: Steve Cruz vs. Barry McGuigan; Round 15
Previous: Steve Cruz vs. Barry McGuigan	The Ring Fight of the Year vs. Sugar Ray Leonard; 1987	Next: Tony Lopez vs. Rocky Lockridge
Middleweight status
Preceded by Hugo Corro	Latest born world champion to die March 13, 2021 – May 31, 2025	Succeeded by Mike McCallum
