= William Douglas (boxer) =

American boxer (1940–1999)

Bill Douglas
Personal information
- Nickname: Dynamite
- Born: William Lee Douglas; March 21, 1940 Columbus, Ohio, U.S.
- Died: October 7, 1999 (aged 59)
- Height: 5 ft 10 in (178 cm)
- Weight: Middleweight

Boxing career
- Stance: Orthodox

Boxing record
- Total fights: 59
- Wins: 42
- Win by KO: 32
- Losses: 16
- Draws: 1

William "Dynamite" Douglas (21 March 1940 – 7 October 1999) was an American boxer. His son is former undisputed world heavyweight champion, James "Buster" Douglas.

A native of Columbus, Ohio, Douglas was a contender in the middleweight and light-heavyweight divisions during the 1970s, fighting such opponents as Bennie Briscoe, Marvin Johnson and Matthew Saad Muhammad. He retired in 1980 with a record of 41-16-1.

Douglas was trained by fellow Ohio native Gary H. Brown, who is a former professional boxer.

== Professional boxing record ==
59 fights	42 wins	16 losses
By knockout	32	7
By decision	10	9
Draws	1	

No.	Result	Record	Opponent	Type	Round, time	Date	Location	Notes
59	Win	42–16–1	William Kince	TKO	4 (8), 2:20	Aug 21, 1980	National Guard Armory, Columbus, Ohio, US	
58	Loss	41–16–1	Jerry Martin	TKO	10 (10)	Feb 18, 1980	Forum, Upper Darby, Pennsylvania, US	
57	Win	41–15–1	Freddie Groves	TKO	2 (10)	Nov 27, 1979	Veterans Memorial Auditorium, Columbus, Ohio, US	
56	Win	40–15–1	Bob Robinson	TKO	2 (10)	Sep 18, 1979	Veterans Memorial Auditorium, Columbus, Ohio, US	
55	Win	39–15–1	Harold Riggins	KO	5 (15)	Jul 2, 1979	Veterans Memorial Auditorium, Columbus, Ohio, US	
54	Win	38–15–1	Sylvester Wilder	KO	3 (10)	May 9, 1979	Veterans Memorial Auditorium, Columbus, Ohio, US	
53	Loss	37–15–1	Paul Ramos	SD	10	Feb 7, 1979	Richfield Coliseum, Richfield, Ohio, US	
52	Win	37–14–1	Charles Smith	PTS	10	Dec 6, 1978	Masonic Auditorium, Cleveland, Ohio, US	
51	Win	36–14–1	Pete Henry	KO	3 (10)	Dec 15, 1977	Fairgrounds, Columbus, Ohio, US	
50	Loss	35–14–1	Marvin Johnson	TKO	5 (10), 2:35	Nov 1, 1977	Spectrum, Philadelphia, Pennsylvania, US	
49	Loss	35–13–1	Matthew Saad Muhammad	TKO	6 (12), 2:44	Sep 17, 1977	Spectrum, Philadelphia, Pennsylvania, US	For NABF light heavyweight title
48	Win	35–12–1	Al Bell	KO	1 (10)	Jul 16, 1977	Fairgrounds, Columbus, Ohio, US	
47	Win	34–12–1	Don Rucker	KO	1 (12)	Jun 11, 1977	Fairgrounds, Columbus, Ohio, US	
46	Loss	33–12–1	Víctor Galíndez	UD	10	Aug 21, 1976	Estadio Luna Park, Buenos Aires, Argentina	
45	Win	33–11–1	Angel Oquendo	TKO	7 (10)	Jul 14, 1976	Convention Hall, Philadelphia, Pennsylvania, US	
44	Loss	32–11–1	Karl Zurheide	TKO	8 (12), 0:45	May 8, 1976	Adams Field House, Missoula, Montana, US	For NABF light heavyweight title
43	Loss	32–10–1	Tom Bethea	MD	10	Mar 8, 1976	Madison Square Garden, New York City, New York, US	
42	Win	32–9–1	Pedro Soto	UD	10	Feb 6, 1976	Madison Square Garden, New York City, New York, US	
41	Win	31–9–1	Dave Lee Royster	TKO	6 (10), 2:36	Dec 19, 1975	Lausche Building, Columbus, Ohio, US	
40	Win	30–9–1	Karl Zurheide	TKO	3 (10)	Feb 15, 1975	Lausche Building, Columbus, Ohio, US	
39	Win	29–9–1	Danny Brewer	KO	2 (15), 1:07	Nov 25, 1974	State Fairgrounds, Columbus, Ohio, US	Won inaugural world junior heavyweight title
38	Loss	28–9–1	Willie Monroe	UD	10	Aug 19, 1974	Spectrum, Philadelphia, Pennsylvania, US	
37	Loss	28–8–1	Elijah Makhathini	UD	10	Dec 22, 1973	Curries Fountain, Durban, South Africa	
36	Win	28–7–1	Octavio Romero	TKO	10 (10), 2:47	Nov 15, 1973	Fort Homer Hesterly Armory, Tampa, Florida, US	
35	Loss	27–7–1	Bennie Briscoe	TKO	8 (12), 2:42	Jun 25, 1973	Spectrum, Philadelphia, Pennsylvania, US	For NABF middleweight title
34	Win	27–6–1	Steven Smith	KO	3 (10)	May 21, 1973	Japan	
33	Win	26–6–1	Ricky Ortiz	TKO	2 (10)	Mar 18, 1973	Lausche Building, Columbus, Ohio, US	
32	Win	25–6–1	Nate Collins	RTD	8 (10)	Jan 15, 1973	Spectrum, Philadelphia, Pennsylvania, US	
31	Win	24–6–1	Marion Conner	TKO	8 (10)	Nov 29, 1972	Arena, Cleveland, Ohio, US	
30	Win	23–6–1	Al Quinney	TKO	8 (10)	Sep 12, 1972	Arena, Philadelphia, Pennsylvania, US	
29	Win	22–6–1	Carlos Marks	PTS	10	May 15, 1972	Arena, Philadelphia, Pennsylvania, US	
28	Win	21–6–1	Sydney Young Hoho	PTS	10	Apr 26, 1972	Athlone Stadium, Cape Town, South Africa	
27	Win	20–6–1	Carlos Marks	TKO	10 (10), 2:31	Mar 21, 1972	Arena, Philadelphia, Pennsylvania, US	
26	Win	19–6–1	Billy Lloyd	KO	1 (10), 1:01	Feb 7, 1972	Arena, Philadelphia, Pennsylvania, US	
25	Loss	18–6–1	Jose Gonzalez	PTS	10	Dec 4, 1971	Hiram Bithorn Stadium, San Juan, Puerto Rico	
24	Win	18–5–1	Michael Paul	KO	1 (?)	Sep 29, 1971	Pointe-à-Pitre, France	
23	Loss	17–5–1	Bunny Sterling	PTS	10	Apr 27, 1971	Royal Albert Hall, Kensington, London, England, UK	
22	Win	17–4–1	Dave Wyatt	KO	5 (?)	Dec 19, 1970	Columbus, Ohio, US	
21	Win	16–4–1	Nojeen Adigun	KO	4 (10), 1:09	Nov 18, 1970	State Fairgrounds, Columbus, Ohio, US	
20	Win	15–4–1	Tom Bethea	UD	10	Sep 12, 1970	Fairgrounds, Columbus, Ohio, US	
19	Draw	14–4–1	Don Fullmer	PTS	10	Jul 11, 1970	Lausche Building, Columbus, Ohio, US	
18	Win	14–4	James Parks	UD	8	Apr 29, 1970	Arena, Cleveland, Ohio, US	
17	Win	13–4	Willie Warren	UD	10	Mar 4, 1970	Fairgrounds, Columbus, Ohio, US	
16	Win	12–4	Wilbert McClure	TKO	10 (10), 2:47	Jan 31, 1970	Fairgrounds, Detroit, Michigan, US	
15	Win	11–4	Sonny Floyd	TKO	5 (10)	Dec 19, 1969	Fairgrounds, Columbus, Ohio, US	
14	Loss	10–4	Pedro Miranda	TKO	7 (10)	Jul 21, 1969	San Juan, Puerto Rico	
13	Win	10–3	Luis Vinales	KO	1 (10), 2:40	Jun 11, 1969	Fairgrounds, Columbus, Ohio, US	
12	Win	9–3	Kenny Partlow	KO	2 (10)	Apr 21, 1969	Fairgrounds Coliseum, Columbus, Ohio, US	
11	Win	8–3	Tommy Shaffer	UD	10	Feb 15, 1969	Municipal Auditorium, Zanesville, Ohio, US	
10	Loss	7–3	Leon Washington	PTS	6	Aug 16, 1968	Union Hall, New York City, New York, US	
9	Win	7–2	Charley Lewis	KO	2 (10)	May 18, 1968	Fairgrounds, Columbus, Ohio, US	
8	Win	6–2	Hilton Whitaker	UD	10	Jan 27, 1968	Fairgrounds, Columbus, Ohio, US	
7	Win	5–2	Larry Tatum	UD	8	Dec 2, 1967	Fairgrounds, Columbus, Ohio, US	
6	Loss	4–2	Larry Tatum	TKO	5 (8)	Oct 3, 1967	Palisades Rink, McKeesport, Pennsylvania, US	
5	Win	4–1	Dawson Smith	TKO	4 (?)	Sep 30, 1967	Fairgrounds, Columbus, Ohio, US	
4	Win	3–1	Art James	KO	3 (?)	Sep 25, 1967	Cobo Arena, Detroit, Michigan, US	
3	Loss	2–1	Conrad Williams	PTS	6	Jun 6, 1967	Sports Arena, Toledo, Ohio, US	
2	Win	2–0	Arnold Bushman	KO	2 (6)	May 27, 1967	Fairgrounds, Columbus, Ohio, US	
1	Win	1–0	Arnold Bushman	TKO	2 (?)	Mar 18, 1967	Armory, Newark, New Jersey, US	

Titles in pretence
Vacant Title last held by Don Fullmer	World Super Middleweight Champion; November 25, 1974	Vacant Title next held by Jerry Halstead
