= Virtual Weapon =

1997 film by Antonio Margheriti

- Directed by: Antonio Margheriti
- Written by: Bruno Corbucci
- Starring: Terence Hill; Marvin Hagler
- Cinematography: Carlo Tafani
- Music by: La Bionda
- Release date: 1997
- Running time: 90 minutes
- Language: English

Virtual Weapon (Italian: Potenza virtuale, also known as Cyberflic) is a 1997 Italian comedy-science fiction film, directed by Antonio Margheriti.

== Cast ==
- Terence Hill as Skims
- Marvin Hagler as Mike
- Giselle Blondet as Chelo
- Jennifer Martinez as Lily
- Tommy Lane as Shepard
- Richard Liberty as Captain Holmes
