= Mustafa Hamsho =

Syrian boxer (b. 1953)

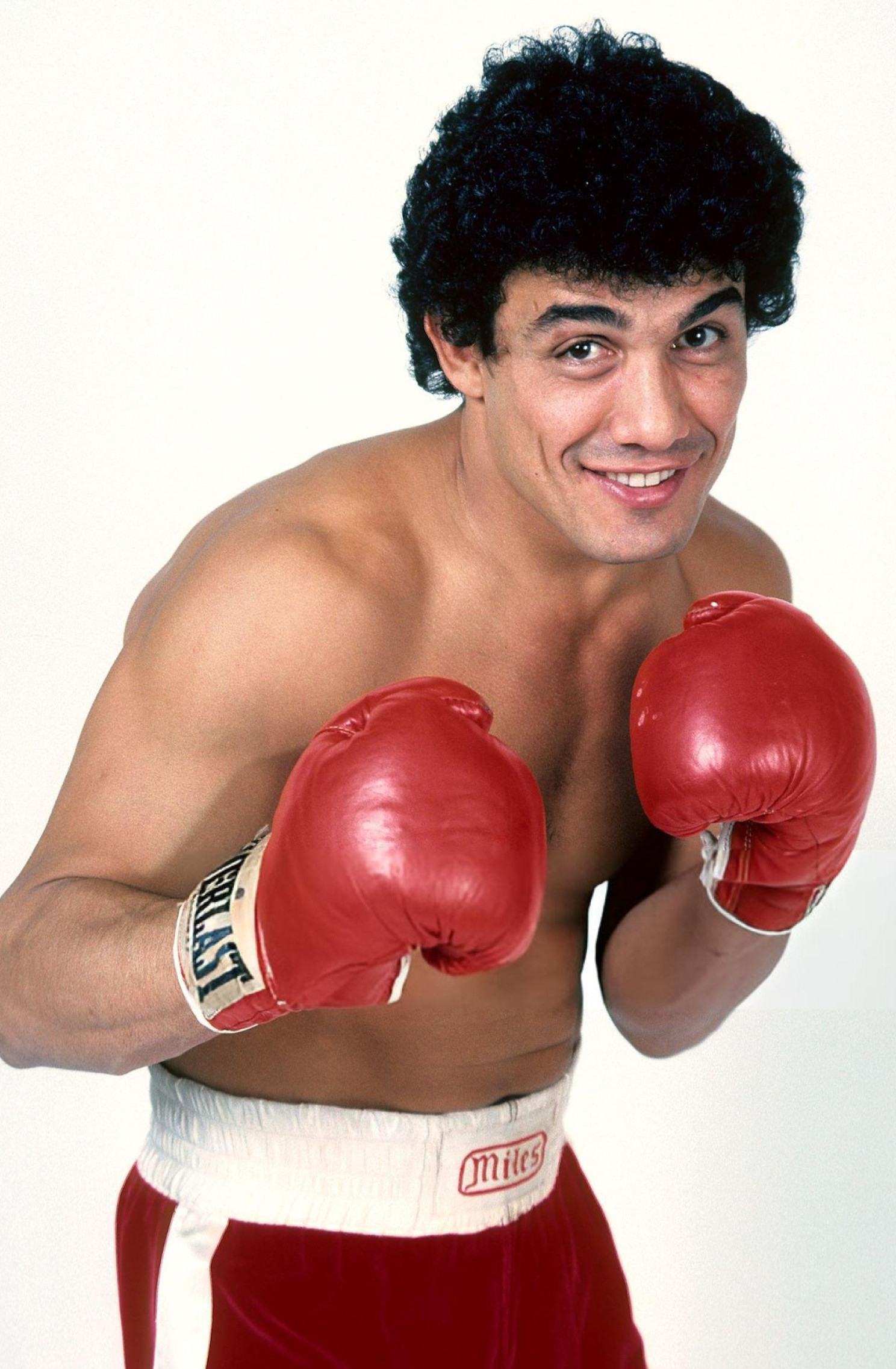
- Hamsho in 1981

Personal information
- Nickname: Rocky Estafire
- Born: October 10, 1953 (age 72) Latakia, Syria
- Height: 5 ft 8 in (1.73 m)
- Weight: Middleweight

Boxing career
- Stance: Southpaw

Boxing record
- Total fights: 51
- Wins: 44
- Win by KO: 28
- Losses: 5
- Draws: 2

Mustafa Hamsho (Arabic: مصطفى حمشو; born 10 October 1953) is a Syrian former professional boxer who competed from 1975 to 1989, challenging twice for the undisputed middleweight world title in 1981 and 1984.

== Professional career ==
The Syrian Slugger racked up a winning record in the late 1970s, and defeated Wilford Scypion on June 15, 1980 and former world middleweight champion Alan Minter on June 6, 1981 to get a shot at then-champion Marvelous Marvin Hagler in October of that year. As Hamsho waded into the champion’s punches seeking an opening, Hagler methodically used right jabs and right hooks to cut his face (which needed 55 stitches). The fight was stopped in the 11th by Hamsho's corner after a Hagler barrage. Sports Illustrated commended Hamsho, calling him courageous for his effort.

Hamsho continued to fight, defeating Curtis Parker, future world champion Bobby Czyz, and former three-division world champion Wilfred Benítez during 1982 and 1983, then received a return visit to take on Hagler in a rematch in October 1984 in Madison Square Garden. After Hamsho tried to play rough in the early going, Hagler ended things early this time by flooring Hamsho twice in the third round (the second knockdown produced by a Floyd Patterson-like hook), thus forcing Hamsho's trainer to jump in and stop the fight. Hamsho would continue to fight, with the biggest name on his list being Donny Lalonde, who decisioned Hamsho in the spring of 1987 and would then go on to become light heavyweight champion later that year. Hamsho's career would then peter out over the next few years.

== Professional boxing record ==
51 fights	44 wins	5 losses
By knockout	28	3
By decision	16	2
Draws	2	

Result	Record	Opponent	Type	Round, Time	Date	Location	Notes
Win	5-7-1	(Jamaica) Wesley Reid	TKO	5	10/11/1989	(United States) Villa Roma Resort, Callicoon, New York, U.S.	
Loss	22-0	(Germany) Graciano Rocchigiani	TKO	1	05/12/1987	Philips Halle, Düsseldorf, Germany	
Win	2-6-1	(United States) Reggie Barnes	TKO	3	10/08/1987	(United States) Hilton Hotel, Secaucus, New Jersey, U.S.	
Loss	28-2	(Canada) Donny Lalonde	UD	12	07/05/1987	(United States) Felt Forum, New York City, New York, U.S.	For vacant WBC Continental Americas light heavyweight title
Win	14-12	(United States) Jimmy Shavers	PTS	10	13/11/1986	(United States) Felt Forum, New York City, New York, U.S.	
Win	8-1	(United States) Richard Burton	TKO	7	14/08/1986	(United States) Felt Forum, New York City, New York, U.S.	
Win	2-6	(United States) Ernie White	KO	4	20/05/1986	(United States) Madison Square Garden, New York City, New York, U.S.	
Win	5-11	(Puerto Rico) Miguel Rosa	TKO	8	28/06/1985	(United States) Rocky Glen Bowl, Scranton, Pennsylvania, U.S.	
Loss	59-2-2	(United States) Marvin Hagler	TKO	3	19/10/1984	(United States) Madison Square Garden, New York City, New York, U.S.	For WBA, WBC, IBF and The Ring middleweight titles
Win	19-4-1	(Jamaica) Alexis Shakespeare	TKO	5	30/03/1984	(United States) Showboat Hotel and Casino, Las Vegas, Nevada, U.S.	
Win	45-2-1	(Puerto Rico) Wilfred Benítez	UD	12	16/07/1983	(United States) Dunes Hotel, Paradise, Nevada, U.S.	
Win	5-8	(United States) Gil Rosario	KO	3	03/06/1983	(United States) Galt Ocean Mile Hotel, Fort Lauderdale, Florida, U.S.	
Win	20-0	(United States) Bobby Czyz	UD	10	20/11/1982	(United States) Convention Hall, Atlantic City, New Jersey, U.S.	
Win	5-5	(United States) Gil Rosario	TKO	3	22/05/1982	(United States) Harrah's Marina Resort, Atlantic City, New Jersey, U.S.	
Win	19-3	(United States) Curtis Parker	PTS	10	13/03/1982	(United States) Playboy Hotel and Casino, Atlantic City, New Jersey, U.S.	
Loss	52-2-2	(United States) Marvin Hagler	TKO	11	03/10/1981	(United States) Rosemont Horizon, Rosemont, Illinois, U.S.	For WBA, WBC and The Ring middleweight titles
Win	39-7	(United Kingdom) Alan Minter	SD	10	06/06/1981	(United States) Caesars Palace, Paradise, Nevada, U.S.	
Win	17-1	(United States) Curtis Parker	SD	10	15/02/1981	(United States) Park Place Hotel, Atlantic City, New Jersey, U.S.	
Win	39-15-1	(United States) Rudy Robles	UD	10	25/11/1980	(United States) Madison Square Garden, New York City, New York, U.S.	
Win	15-4-2	(United States) Bob Patterson	KO	4	24/09/1980	(United States) Thomas Dunn Sports Center, Elizabeth, New Jersey, U.S.	
Win	16-0	(United States) Wilford Scypion	DQ	10	15/06/1980	(United States) Pine Knob Music Theatre, Clarkston, Michigan, U.S.	
Win	15-6-1	(United States) Reggie Jones	TKO	6	29/03/1980	(United States) Resorts International, Atlantic City, New Jersey, U.S.	
Win	4-5	(United States) Barry Hill	TKO	1	04/10/1979	(United States) Embassy Hall, North Bergen, New Jersey, U.S.	
Win	7-15-1	(Dominican Republic) Fermín Guzmán	KO	7	19/09/1979	(United States) Felt Forum, New York City, New York, U.S.	
Win	27-5-2	(United States) Leo Saenz	KO	6	17/07/1979	(United States) Steel Pier Arena, Atlantic City, New Jersey, U.S.	
Win	14-24-2	(Puerto Rico) Domingo Ortiz	TKO	7	27/06/1979	(United States) Hilton Hotel, Secaucus, New Jersey, U.S.	
Win	14-23-2	(Puerto Rico) Domingo Ortiz	KO	8	26/04/1979	(United States) Embassy Hall, North Bergen, New Jersey, U.S.	
Win	4-14-5	(United States) Tyrone Freeman	TKO	1	11/04/1979	(United States) Westchester County Center, White Plains, New York, U.S.	
Win	5-24-1	(United States) Winston Noel	KO	2	15/03/1979	(United States) Embassy Hall, North Bergen, New Jersey, U.S.	
Win	33-11-2	(United States) Irish Pat Murphy	TKO	3	27/01/1979	(United States) Jersey City Armory, Jersey City, New Jersey, U.S.	
Win	4-8	(United States) Don Johnson	TKO	6	01/12/1978	(United States) Jersey City Armory, Jersey City, New Jersey, U.S.	
Win	17-8-1	(United States) Eddie Parks	TKO	2	28/10/1978	(United States) Jersey City Armory, Jersey City, New Jersey, U.S.	
Win	31-4-1	(United States) Bobby Watts	TKO	6	21/09/1978	(United States) Jersey City Armory, Jersey City, New Jersey, U.S.	
Win	5-2-1	(United States) Frank Moore	TKO	2	28/06/1978	(United States) Civic Center, Providence, Rhode Island, U.S.	
Win	18-3	(United States) Rocky Mosley, Jr.	PTS	8	21/01/1978	(United States) Caesars Palace, Paradise, Nevada, U.S.	
Win	4-4	(United States) Antonio Adame	PTS	10	09/11/1977	(United States) Marina Hotel, Paradise, Nevada, U.S.	
Win	3-2	(United States) Gil Rosario	PTS	6	27/09/1977	(United States) Recreation Center, West New York, New Jersey, U.S.	
Win	7-6	(United States) Archie Andrews	PTS	6	23/06/1977	(United States) Branch Brook Ice Rink, Newark, New Jersey, U.S.	
Win	0-5	(United States) Lorenzo Howard	KO	1	20/05/1977	(United States) Broome County Arena, Binghamton, New York, U.S.	
Win	4-6	(United States) Lester Camper	PTS	8	29/04/1977	(United States) Civic Center, Baltimore, Maryland, U.S.	
Win	--	(United States) Bernard McLean	PTS	8	29/10/1976	(United States) Sunnyside Garden Arena, New York City, New York, U.S.	
Win	--	(United States) Benji Goldstone	PTS	4	02/10/1976	(United States) Utica College Sports Complex, Utica, New York, U.S.	
Win	6-7-1	(United States) Cove Green	TKO	4	11/09/1976	(United States) Memorial Auditorium, Utica, New York, U.S.	
Draw	6-4	(United States) Reggie Jones	PTS	8	16/08/1976	(United States) Newark School Outdoor Stadium, Newark, New Jersey, U.S.	
Win	6-29-2	(United States) Roger Phillips	KO	2	26/06/1976	(United States) Providence, Rhode Island, U.S.	
Win	16-11	(United States) Charlie Small	PTS	6	08/05/1976	(United States) Utica, New York, U.S.	
Win	3-9-1	(Argentina) Carlos Novotny	TKO	3	28/04/1976	(United States) Sunnyside Garden Arena, New York City, New York, U.S.	
Win	8-8	(United States) Richie Villanueva	KO	3	14/04/1976	(United States) Sunnyside Garden Arena, New York City, New York, U.S.	
Win	5-14-2	(United States) Joe Houston	KO	2	21/11/1975	(United States) Providence, Rhode Island, U.S.	
Draw	1-0	(United States) Danny McNevin	PTS	4	23/10/1975	(United States) Broome County Arena, Binghamton, New York, U.S.	
Loss	--	(United States) Pat Cuillo	PTS	6	23/08/1975	(United States) Broome County Arena, Binghamton, New York, U.S.	
