= Indio 2: The Revolt =

1991 film

- Theatrical release poster
- Directed by: Antonio Margheriti
- Written by: Filiberto Bandini; Franco Bucceri
- Produced by: Filiberto Bandini
- Starring: Marvelous Marvin Hagler
- Cinematography: Roberto Benvenuti
- Edited by: Angela Cipriani
- Music by: Pino Donaggio
- Production company: R.P.A. International
- Distributed by: United International Pictures
- Release date: 18 April 1991 (Italy)
- Running time: 95 minutes
- Country: Italy
- Languages: Italian; English

Indio 2 : The Revolt (Italian: Indio 2 - La rivolta) is a 1991 Italian action film starring Marvelous Marvin Hagler and directed by Antonio Margheriti and it is the sequel to the 1989 film Indio.

== Plot Outline ==
Former Marine sergeant organizes the revolt of the Amazon Indians against the ruthless mercenaries of a multinational, using defoliants, build a road into the forest.

== Cast ==
- Marvelous Marvin Hagler as Jake
- Frank Cuervo as Ugadi
- Dirk Galuba as Vincent van Eyck
- Maurizio Fardo as Father Leonard
- Jacqueline Carol as Mama Lou
- Charles Napier as IMC President
- Tetchie Agbayani as Mrs. Morrell
- Mark F. Hill as American Dancer

== See also ==
- List of Italian films of 1991
