= Willie Monroe (boxer, born 1946) =

American boxer (1946–2019)

Personal information
- Nickname: The Worm
- Born: June 5, 1946 Alabama, U.S.
- Died: June 22, 2019 (aged 73) Sicklerville, New Jersey, U.S.
- Height: 6 ft (183 cm)
- Weight: Middleweight

Boxing career
- Stance: Orthodox

Boxing record
- Total fights: 51
- Wins: 40
- Win by KO: 26
- Losses: 10
- Draws: 1

Willie "The Worm" Monroe (June 5, 1946 - June 22, 2019) was a middleweight boxer who competed from 1969 to 1981. He was most notable for defeating Marvelous Marvin Hagler in 1976 before Hagler went on an eleven year undefeated streak.

Monroe received his nickname "the Worm" for his slippery fighting style from Yank Durham. He died on Saturday, June 22, 2019, after complications with Alzheimers.

He was inducted into the Pennsylvania boxing hall of fame in 1990 and is the great-uncle of American boxer Willie Monroe Jr.

== Early life and amateur career ==
Monroe was born in Alabama as the 13th of 17 children and spent his early years in Crestview, Florida. He started boxing in Rochester, New York where he claimed an undefeated 43-0 amateur record. He arrived in Philadelphia, Pennsylvania in the autumn of 1969 to train for his pro-debut.

== Professional career ==
Monroe started his professional career with a perfect record of 20-0 before being stopped in a controversial split decision against Max Cohen.

A string of mixed results would follow with a notable win over Eugene Hart and losses to Alvin Philipps and Bobby Watts.

Monroe would go on to defeat Marvelous Marvin Hagler on March 9, 1976 in decisive fashion. Unfortunately no footage of the fight exists as a snowstorm in the area prevented filming. Two rematches would follow which were both won by technical knockout by Hagler

== Professional boxing record ==
51 fights	40 wins	10 losses
By knockout	26	4
By decision	14	6
Draws	1	

No.	Result	Record	Opponent	Type	Round, time	Date	Location	Notes
51	Loss	40–10–1	Willie Edwards	KO	4 (6)	Oct 24, 1981	Cobo Hall, Detroit, Michigan, US	
50	Win	40–9–1	Jimmy McClain	UD	10	Jul 28, 1980	Martin Luther King Arena, Philadelphia, Pennsylvania, US	
49	Loss	39–9–1	Dwight Davidson	UD	10	Nov 15, 1979	Cobo Arena, Detroit, Michigan, US	
48	Loss	39–8–1	Curtis Parker	UD	10	Jul 16, 1979	Spectrum, Philadelphia, Pennsylvania, US	
47	Win	39–7–1	Keith Broom	UD	10	May 31, 1979	Convention Hall, Philadelphia, Pennsylvania, US	
46	Loss	38–7–1	Richard Ofosu	PTS	10	Mar 3, 1979	Accra, Ghana	
45	Win	38–6–1	Frank Lucas	TKO	8 (10)	Apr 22, 1978	Teatro Ariston, San Remo, Italy	
44	Loss	37–6–1	Marvelous Marvin Hagler	TKO	2 (12), 1:46	Aug 23, 1977	Spectrum, Philadelphia, Pennsylvania, US	
43	Win	37–5–1	Larry Davis	PTS	10	Jun 15, 1977	Wagner Ballroom, Philadelphia, Pennsylvania, US	
42	Loss	36–5–1	Marvelous Marvin Hagler	TKO	12 (12), 1:20	Feb 15, 1977	Hynes Convention Center, Boston, Massachusetts, US	For vacant North American middleweight title
41	Win	36–4–1	Lenny Harden	TKO	3 (10)	Jan 21, 1977	War Memorial Auditorium, Rochester, New York, US	
40	Win	35–4–1	Angel Robinson Garcia	TKO	7 (10), 3:00	Dec 3, 1976	War Memorial Auditorium, Rochester, New York, US	
39	Loss	34–4–1	David Love	TKO	4 (10), 2:11	Aug 16, 1976	Spectrum, Philadelphia, Pennsylvania, US	
38	Win	34–3–1	Felton Marshall	TKO	7 (10), 1:37	May 19, 1976	Spectrum, Philadelphia, Pennsylvania, US	
37	Win	33–3–1	Marvelous Marvin Hagler	UD	10	Mar 9, 1976	Spectrum, Philadelphia, Pennsylvania, US	
36	Win	32–3–1	Carlos Marks	UD	10	Jan 28, 1976	Arena, Philadelphia, Pennsylvania, US	
35	Win	31–3–1	Carlos Marks	MD	10	Jun 2, 1975	Arena, Philadelphia, Pennsylvania, US	
34	Win	30–3–1	Rennie Pinder	KO	4 (10)	Apr 28, 1975	Arena, Philadelphia, Pennsylvania, US	
33	Loss	29–3–1	Bobby Watts	UD	10	Nov 12, 1974	Spectrum, Philadelphia, Pennsylvania, US	
32	Win	29–2–1	Billy Douglas	UD	10	Aug 19, 1974	Spectrum, Philadelphia, Pennsylvania, US	
31	Win	28–2–1	Stanley Hayward	TKO	7 (10)	Apr 8, 1974	Spectrum, Philadelphia, Pennsylvania, US	
30	Win	27–2–1	Eugene Hart	UD	10	Feb 18, 1974	Spectrum, Philadelphia, Pennsylvania, US	
29	Draw	26–2–1	Fabio Bettini	PTS	10	Nov 5, 1973	Palais des Sports, Paris, France	
28	Win	26–2	Jose Gonzalez	UD	10	Aug 14, 1973	Convention Hall, Philadelphia, Pennsylvania, US	
27	Win	25–2	Roy McMillan	TKO	3 (10), 0:36	May 10, 1973	Arena, Philadelphia, Pennsylvania, US	
26	Win	24–2	Don Cobbs	UD	10	Mar 5, 1973	Spectrum, Philadelphia, Pennsylvania, US	
25	Win	23–2	Roy Lee	TKO	1 (10), 2:40	Jan 22, 1973	National Stadium, Kingston, Jamaica	
24	Win	22–2	George Davis	TKO	6 (10), 0:08	Dec 5, 1972	Arena, Philadelphia, Pennsylvania, US	
23	Win	21–2	Leroy Roberts	KO	1 (10)	Oct 24, 1972	Arena, Philadelphia, Pennsylvania, US	
22	Loss	20–2	Alvin Phillips	SD	10	Sep 6, 1972	Municipal Auditorium, New Orleans, Louisiana, US	
21	Loss	20–1	Nessim Max Cohen	SD	10	Mar 27, 1972	Palais des Sports Porte de Versailles, Paris XV, France	
20	Win	20–0	Luis Miguel Galvan	UD	10	Mar 21, 1972	Sam Houston Coliseum, Houston, Texas, US	
19	Win	19–0	Alvin Phillips	PTS	10	Jan 15, 1972	Rivergate Auditorium, New Orleans, Louisiana, US	
18	Win	18–0	Willie Warren	UD	10	Oct 19, 1971	Sam Houston Coliseum, Houston, Texas, US	
17	Win	17–0	Elgie Walters	TKO	4 (10)	Jul 14, 1971	Astro Hall, Houston, Texas, US	
16	Win	16–0	Abraham Cabrera	KO	3 (10), 1:41	May 27, 1971	Arena, Philadelphia, Pennsylvania, US	
15	Win	15–0	Adam Moore	KO	2 (10)	Apr 12, 1971	Fort Homer Hesterly Armory, Tampa, Florida, US	
14	Win	14–0	Alvin Phillips	UD	10	Jan 18, 1971	Spectrum, Philadelphia, Pennsylvania, US	
13	Win	13–0	Luis Vinales	TKO	6 (6), 1:25	Nov 17, 1970	Spectrum, Philadelphia, Pennsylvania, US	
12	Win	12–0	Nojeen Adigun	KO	4 (8)	Oct 6, 1970	Spectrum, Philadelphia, Pennsylvania, US	
11	Win	11–0	Adam Moore	TKO	3 (6)	Sep 14, 1970	Municipal Auditorium, New Orleans, Louisiana, US	
10	Win	10–0	Oscar Coor	TKO	2 (6), 1:59	Jul 20, 1970	Spectrum, Philadelphia, Pennsylvania, US	
9	Win	9–0	Santiago Rosa	TKO	2 (10), 0:22	Jul 13, 1970	Fort Homer W. Hesterly Armory, Tampa, Florida, US	
8	Win	8–0	Harold Glaspy	TKO	2 (6), 1:36	Jul 6, 1970	Municipal Auditorium, New Orleans, Louisiana, US	
7	Win	7–0	Ruben Figueroa	KO	2 (8)	Jun 15, 1970	Arena, Philadelphia, Pennsylvania, US	
6	Win	6–0	Alberto Millan	KO	3 (8)	May 18, 1970	Blue Horizon, Philadelphia, Pennsylvania, US	
5	Win	5–0	Luis Ted Hamilton	KO	1 (6)	Apr 22, 1970	Blue Horizon, Philadelphia, Pennsylvania, US	
4	Win	4–0	Luis Rivera	TKO	1 (6)	Mar 25, 1970	Blue Horizon, Philadelphia, Pennsylvania, US	
3	Win	3–0	Fred Thomas	KO	1 (6)	Feb 25, 1970	Blue Horizon, Philadelphia, Pennsylvania, US	
2	Win	2–0	Joe Williams	TKO	4 (4)	Dec 9, 1969	Blue Horizon, Philadelphia, Pennsylvania, US	
1	Win	1–0	Vince Neratka	KO	1 (4)	Nov 11, 1969	Blue Horizon, Philadelphia, Pennsylvania, US	
