= Fight Night =

Fight Night may refer to:

== Film and television ==
- Fight Night (film), a.k.a. Rigged, a 2008 film
- "Fight Night" (CSI), an episode of CSI: Crime Scene Investigation
- Fight Night (TV programme), a British boxing programme
- Fight Night: The Million Dollar Heist, a 2024 miniseries
- "Fight Night" and "Fight Night II", episodes of Big Brother (UK) series 5 and series 9, respectively

== Video games ==
- Fight Night (1985 video game), a boxing computer game published by Accolade and U.S. Gold
- Fight Night (video game series), a series of video games produced by EA Sports, unrelated to the Accolade game
  - Fight Night 2004, the first game in the series
  - Fight Night Round 2, the first sequel to Fight Night 2004
  - Fight Night Round 3, the second sequel
  - Fight Night Round 4, the third sequel
  - Fight Night Champion, the fourth sequel

== Sports ==
- UFC Ultimate Fight Night, a series of Ultimate Fighting Championship events
- Fight Night, a boxing program on NBCSN

== Other ==
- "Fight Night" (song), a 2014 song by Migos
- Fight Night, a 2021 novel by Miriam Toews

== See also ==
- "Fight Knight", an episode of the 2008 TV series Knight Rider
- "Fite Nite" (Ray Donovan), a 2013 television episode
- "Fite Nite" (Rookie Blue), a 2010 television episode
