= Fight Night 2004 =

2004 boxing video game

- Cover art, featuring Roy Jones Jr.
- Developers: EA Canada and NuFX
- Publisher: EA Sports
- Producer: Rory Armes
- Artist: Ali Kojori (Technical Art Director)
- Platforms: PlayStation 2 Xbox
- Release: NA: April 5, 2004; EU: April 30, 2004
- Genre: Sports
- Modes: Single player, multiplayer

Fight Night 2004 is a 2004 boxing video game developed by NuFX, Inc. It features Roy Jones Jr. on the cover. It is the successor to EA's previous boxing series, Knockout Kings. Four sequels followed, Fight Night Round 2 in 2005, Fight Night Round 3 in 2006, Fight Night Round 4 in 2009 and Fight Night Champion in 2011. Its chief features are a career mode, in-depth and reasonably realistic fighting and an analog stick-based control scheme dubbed Total Punch Control, which was re-used, with enhancements, in the sequels.

== Total Punch Control ==
With Total Punch Control, most maneuvers, including punching, leaning and blocking, are performed with the left or right analog sticks, modified by the left or right triggers. For example, with the default controller configuration, moving the right analog stick up and to the left will cause the fighter to throw a straight punch with his left hand, while holding down the right trigger while performing the same movement and then holding R1 will cause the fighter to raise his guard to the left side of his head, ready to attempt a parry.

== Fighters ==
There are 32 licensed fighters and 300 boxers total in the game spread out through 6 different weight classes.

=== Legends ===
- Muhammad Ali
- Joe Frazier
- Sonny Liston
- Rocky Marciano
- Jake LaMotta
- Sugar Ray Leonard
- Sugar Ray Robinson
- Evander Holyfield
- Roberto Duran

=== Current ===
- Roy Jones Jr.
- Lennox Lewis
- Bernard Hopkins
- Felix Trinidad
- Shane Mosley
- Arturo Gatti
- Micky Ward
- Erik Morales
- Marco Antonio Barrera
- Rafael Márquez
- Juan Manuel Marquez
- Kevin Kelley
- Derrick Gainer
- Winky Wright
- James Toney
- Ken Norton
- Chris Byrd
- Jeff Lacy
- Antonio Tarver
- Jermain Taylor
- Ricardo Mayorga
- Mike Anchondo
- Jesse James Leija

== Reception ==
Reception

Aggregate score
Aggregator	Score	
Aggregator	PS2	Xbox
Metacritic	85/100	85/100

Review scores
Publication	Score	
Publication	PS2	Xbox
Computer Games Magazine	B+	B+
Edge	7/10	N/A
Electronic Gaming Monthly	8.5/10 (Note: Three critics of Electronic Gaming Monthly gave the game each a score of 8.5/10, 9/10, and 8/10.)	8.5/10
Eurogamer	6/10	N/A
Famitsu	32/40	N/A
Game Informer	9/10	9/10
GameRevolution	B	B
GameSpot	8.8/10	8.7/10
GameSpy	4.5/5	4/5
GameZone	9/10	N/A
IGN	8.6/10	8.4/10
Official U.S. PlayStation Magazine	4/5	N/A
Official Xbox Magazine (US)	N/A	8.9/10
X-Play	4/5	N/A
BBC Sport	80%	80%
The Village Voice	8/10	N/A

Fight Night 2004 received "favorable" reviews on both platforms according to video game review aggregator Metacritic. Four-Eyed Dragon of GamePro called it "the victor in all weight classes for this year. If you're into boxing, this should be the only game to pick up and play." (Note: GamePro gave the game three 5/5 scores for graphics, control, and fun factor, and 4.5/5 for sound.) In Japan, where the PlayStation 2 version was ported for release on August 5, 2004, Famitsu gave it a score of two eights, one seven, and one nine for a total of 32 out of 40.

The Village Voice gave the PS2 version a score of eight out of ten and stated that "Taking on generic career-mode opponents can't match fighting friends." BBC Sport gave the game an 80% and said, "The road to the top is a long one and things become repetitive long before you get the chance to glove up against "The Greatest". And training - which is essential to boost your power, stamina and chin - becomes a real chore." Maxim also gave it eight out of ten and said, "Instead of the usual push-button pugilism, throw punches using the analog stick—the direction and speed of the stick determine the swing; the trigger controls handle bobbing, weaving, and blocking." Playboy gave it a score of 75% and said that the game "adds a bit of bob and weave through a control system that allows you to swivel your fighter at the hips."

GameSpot named it the best Xbox game of April 2004 in review. It was also nominated for the "Best Traditional Sports Game" award at the website's Best and Worst of 2004 Awards, which went to ESPN NFL 2K5.

Sales of the game surpassed 1 million units worldwide by the end of June 2004. By July 2006, the PS2 version had sold 850,000 units and earned $36 million in the U.S. NextGen ranked it as the 68th highest-selling game launched for the PlayStation 2, Xbox or GameCube between October 2000 and July 2006 in that country. Combined console sales of Fight Night games released in the 2000s reached 2.5 million units in the U.S. by July 2006.
