= Knockout Kings 2002 =

2002 video game

- North American cover art featuring Muhammad Ali
- Developer(s): Black Ops Entertainment
- Publisher(s): EA Sports
- Series: Knockout Kings
- Platform(s): PlayStation 2, Xbox
- Release: NA: March 5, 2002; EU: April 5, 2002 (PS2); EU: May 3, 2002 (Xbox)
- Genre(s): Sports
- Mode(s): Single-player, multiplayer

Knockout Kings 2002 is a boxing video game by EA Sports, released in March 2002 for PlayStation 2 and Xbox. It features Muhammad Ali on the front cover. It also features many well-known boxers like Lennox Lewis, Félix Trinidad, Oscar De La Hoya, Evander Holyfield, Butterbean, Vitali and Wladimir Klitschko, and Bernard Hopkins. It is the fourth installment in the Knockout Kings series, and was succeeded by Knockout Kings 2003 later that same year, for the GameCube.

== Gameplay ==
Knockout Kings 2002 features a different engine than its predecessors, as it now features smoother graphics and a new control scheme, which allows boxers to move around the ring more fluidly, as well as a new analog evasion system, where tilting the left analog stick slightly allows a boxer to bob and weave in the direction of the stick's movement.

Like its predecessors, Knockout Kings 2002 features a career mode, where a player can create a boxer and partake in a series of fights to become champion. For the first time, players can use a real boxer in the mode. The game also features a tournament mode.

Unlike Knockout Kings 2001 before it, the game forgoes female boxers, instead featuring some fictional boxers including, but not limited to, Henri Tibualt, Joe Giere, Kazahiro Arikawa, Tyler Brooks, Pete Donohue, and Lawrence O'Toole. These boxers would later be featured in Knockout Kings 2003.

== Reviews ==
Metacritic gave the game a score of 76/100 on PS2 and 78/100 on Xbox.

Reception

Aggregate score
Aggregator	Score
Metacritic	76/100 (PS2); 78/100 (Xbox)

Review scores
Publication	Score
GameRevolution	C
GameSpot	8.4/10 (PS2); 8.3/10 (Xbox)
IGN	8.9/10 (PS2); 8.8/10 (Xbox)
