= Black Dawn (video game) =

1996 video game

- European PlayStation cover art
- Developers: Black Ops Entertainment (PS); Point of View (Saturn)
- Publisher: Virgin Interactive Entertainment
- Composer: Todd Dennis
- Platforms: PlayStation, Saturn
- Release: PlayStation: NA: October 24, 1996; JP: December 27, 1996; EU: February 1997; Saturn: NA: 1996; JP: April 25, 1997; EU: 1997
- Genre: Shooter game
- Mode: Single player

Black Dawn is a helicopter-combat simulation, published by Virgin Interactive Entertainment. It was released on the Sony PlayStation and the Sega Saturn in 1996.

== Plot ==
Set in 1998, the player controls a helicopter ace recruited into a black ops counterterrorism strike force named Operation Black Dawn. The player pilots the agile AH-69 Mohawk, an advanced combat helicopter with a powerful arsenal of weaponry.

== Gameplay ==
The game consists of seven campaigns that take place in different areas, and each campaign has a number of different missions. In addition to search-and-destroy objectives, there are hostages that require saving. The game has drawn comparisons with Soviet Strike, another helicopter simulator released in the same year. However, Black Dawn resembles an arcade game rather than a typical simulator, not least because various power-ups are obtained from destroyed enemies.

A two-player deathmatch mode is included, but can only be accessed via a cheat code.

== Development ==
Lead programmer Will Botti cited Choplifter as an inspiration for the game. The game uses the same engine as Agile Warrior, Black Ops Entertainment's previous game.

== Reception ==
Reception

Review scores
Publication	Score
AllGame	3/5 (SAT); 3/5 (PS1)
Electronic Gaming Monthly	7.125/10 (PS1)
GameSpot	7.6/10 (PS1)
Next Generation	4/5 (PS1)
Sega Saturn Magazine	85% (SAT)

Black Dawn received generally positive reviews. Critics praised the intense gameplay with numerous targets, the orchestral music, and the clean, detailed graphics, though some criticized the heavy use of distance fog and the blocky ground textures. Some also remarked that the complex controls take time to get used to. However, nearly all were left with an overall positive impression; GameSpot assessed it as "what loud, engaging gameplay is all about", Next Generation called it "a pleasing combination of excellent graphics and dead-on game play", Sega Saturn Magazine summarized it as "A top 3D shoot 'em up that's initially difficult to get to grips with, but ultimately is a very fine game indeed", and GamePro concluded, "A few flaws aside, Black Dawn is a well-rounded game that delivers riveting, adrenaline-packed combat." Electronic Gaming Monthly named it a runner-up for Flying Game of the Year (behind Pilotwings 64).

GamePro called the Saturn version "an impressive, exact port of the PlayStation game", but went on to say that the graphics are not as clean and the control configuration is not as intuitive.
