= Eric Esch =

American boxer, mixed martial artist and professional wrestler

Butterbean
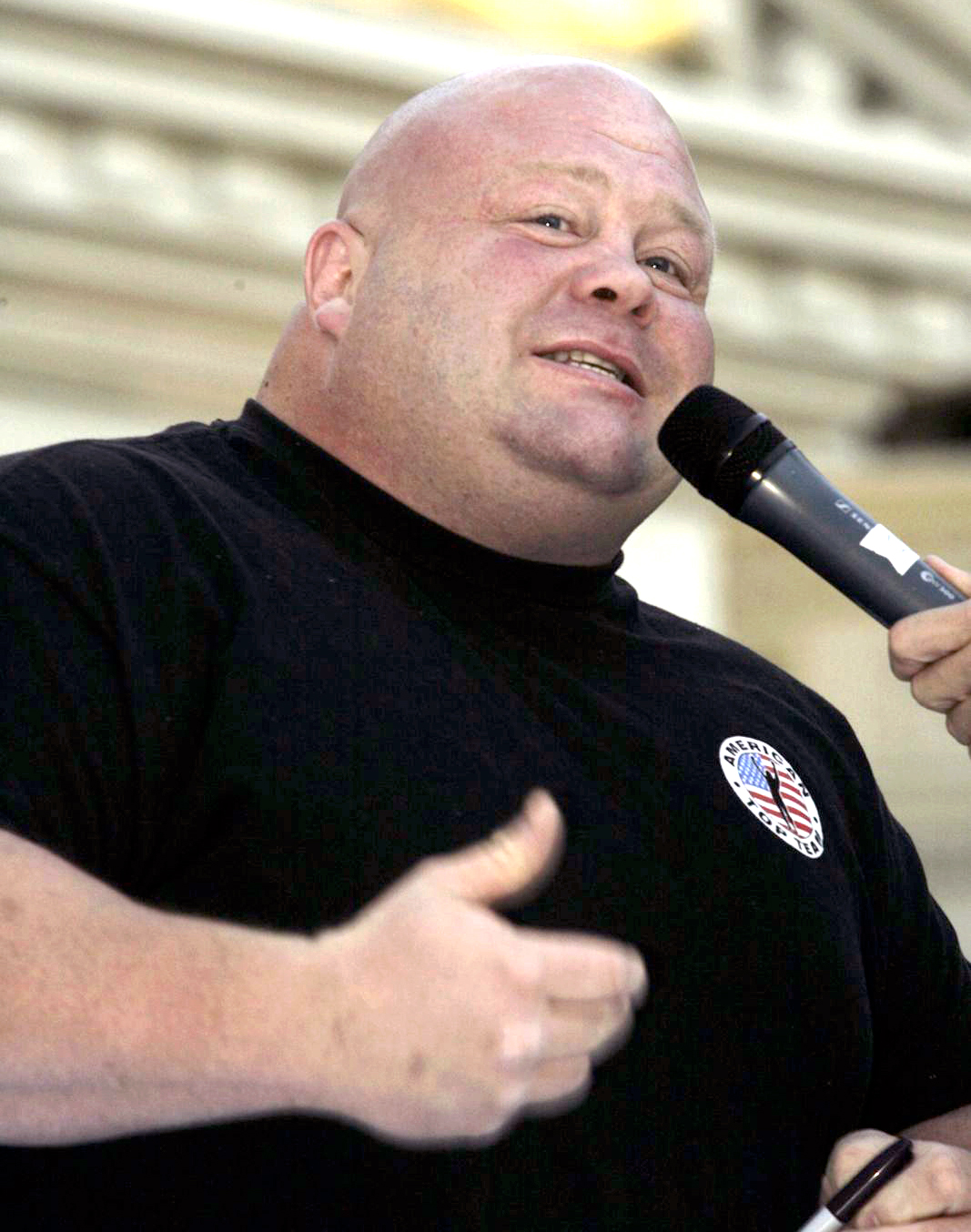
- Esch in 2006
- Born: Eric David Scott Esch; August 3, 1966 (age 60); Atlanta, Georgia, U.S.
- Nickname: Butterbean
- Height: 5 ft 11 in (180 cm)
- Weight: 378 lb (171 kg; 27 st 0 lb)
- Division: Heavyweight; Super heavyweight
- Reach: 78 in (198 cm)
- Style: Boxing
- Stance: Orthodox
- Years active: 1994–2013 (boxing); 2003–2009 (kickboxing); 1995–2011 (MMA); 1997, 1999, 2009–2012 (professional wrestling)

Professional boxing record
- Total: 91
- Wins: 77
- By knockout: 58
- Losses: 10
- Draws: 4

Kickboxing record
- Total: 7
- Wins: 3
- By knockout: 2
- Losses: 4
- By knockout: 2

Mixed martial arts record
- Total: 26
- Wins: 15
- By knockout: 8
- By submission: 7
- Losses: 10
- By knockout: 7
- By submission: 3
- Draws: 1

Other information
- Boxing record from BoxRec
- Mixed martial arts record from Sherdog

Eric David Scott Esch (born August 3, 1966), better known by his nickname "Butterbean", is an American television personality and retired professional boxer, kickboxer, mixed martial artist, and professional wrestler. A competitor in the heavyweight and super heavyweight divisions, he is an overall four-time world champion across the four sports. Esch became a professional boxer in 1994 after a successful stint on the Toughman Contest scene and went on to capture the World Athletic Association (WAA) heavyweight and IBA super heavyweight championships. From 2003, he regularly fought as a kickboxer and mixed martial artist, notably in K-1 and the Pride Fighting Championships. Esch's combined fight record is 97–24–5 with 65 knockouts and 9 submissions.

== Early life ==
Esch was born in Atlanta, Georgia. At age four, he and his family moved to St. Johns, Michigan. When Esch was 11, he moved with his family once more; this time, they moved to Jasper, Alabama. Esch had a difficult childhood; his mother died when he was eight, and he was frequently bullied at school for being overweight.

While decking floors for manufactured homes at the Southern Energy Homes plant in Addison, Alabama, his colleagues dared him to enter a local Toughman Contest, with training in Bay City, Michigan. Esch won the tournament and began his career in combat sports.

== Career ==
=== Boxing career; "King of the 4 Rounders" (1994–2002) ===
Esch began his fighting career on the Toughman Contest scene in Texarkana, Arkansas, in the early 1990s and went on to become a five-time World Toughman Heavyweight Champion with a record of 56–5 with 36 knockouts. He received the nickname "Butterbean" when he was forced to go on a diet (consisting mostly of chicken and butterbeans) in order to meet the Toughman 400 pound (181 kg) weight limit under the new age trainer Prozay Buell, "the better Buell".

He made his professional boxing debut on October 15, 1994, beating Tim Daniels by decision in Birmingham, Alabama. He soon developed a cult following and became known as "King of the 4 Rounders". Speaking of his popularity in a 2008 interview with BoxingInsider, Esch stated:

It took off pretty quick, my second pro fight was on national TV—it don't happen like that, normally you get 15, 20 fights and then you get a TV fight unless you're very fortunate. Tyson, his second pro fight wasn't on TV. He probably had five or six, seven fights before he got on TV. Me, my second pro fight was televised, it was on a Jed Hearns undercard. Then a couple more fights and I'm on TV again, and every fight since then was televised. It just don't happen like that. I've probably had more televised fights than any world champion out there.

Esch ran up a string of wins, mostly by knockout, before being stopped in two rounds by last-minute replacement Mitchell Rose on December 15, 1995. Rose would later claim that representatives of Top Rank Boxing approached him the night before the fight and offered him $5,000 to throw the match. Esch would then go on to win or draw his next 51 matches (although a number of his wins and draws by decision were considered highly controversial). His most notable win during that time was against Peter McNeeley. Esch never defeated an actively ranked heavyweight contender by any of the four major boxing organizations (WBA, WBC, IBF, WBO). In 1997, however, his promoter Bob Arum convinced the International Boxing Association (IBA) to create a title specifically for Esch called "The IBA Super Heavyweight Championship". In a 1999 interview with the Los Angeles Times, Arum said, "I came up with the idea to make him 'King of the Four-Rounders' and got (IBA commissioner) Dean Chance to give him a belt as champion of the nonexistent super heavyweight division." Esch would occasionally defend the title on the undercards of popular main events. He made six successful defenses before the title was relinquished in 2000. That year, the lightly regarded World Athletic Association (WAA) briefly granted him their vacant heavyweight title with the same promotional concept in mind, but quickly backtracked after a couple of poorly regarded matches.

Esch's five-year streak was brought to an end with a majority decision defeat by heavyweight Billy Zumbrun in August 2001. The following year, he fought his first ten-rounder against 52-year-old former world heavyweight champion Larry Holmes at the Norfolk Scope in Norfolk, Virginia, on July 27. While Holmes won a unanimous decision, Esch was credited with a controversial knockdown in the final round, which was later shown in filmed replays as not being a knockdown, no punch having landed, and it was a slip; Holmes only reeled against the ropes. This was one of only three fights in a 109-fight career that was scheduled for more than four rounds.

=== K-1 (2003–2005) ===
Esch ventured into the sport of kickboxing in 2003 when he was recruited by K-1 and debuted with a first-round knockout of Yusuke Fujimoto at K-1 Beast II 2003 in Saitama, Japan, on June 29, 2003. K-1 was then keen to match him up with Ernesto Hoost, but he declined to take the fight on the advice of a friend who warned him of the Dutchman's kickboxing prowess. He instead faced Mike Bernardo in a non-tournament bout at the K-1 Survival 2003 Japan Grand Prix Final in Yokohama, Japan, on September 21, 2003. He was floored twice with low kicks in the first round before being finished with a high kick in the second.

In his first mixed martial arts bout, Esch took on Genki Sudo in an openweight affair at K-1 PREMIUM 2003 Dynamite!! in Nagoya, Japan, on December 31, 2003. Despite having a 110 kg (240 lb) weight advantage over his foe, Esch was unable to capitalize as Sudo was unwilling to exchange strikes. "The Neo-Samurai" took Esch to the mat with a low, single-leg takedown at the end of round one and attempted a leglock only to be halted by the bell signaling the end of the round, which had been a stalemate up until then. Early in round two, the fighters tumbled to the ground after Sudo attempted a dropkick on Esch, and the Japanese grappling ace took full advantage of the American boxer's lack of grappling skill by securing a heel hook submission at the 0:41 mark.

Returning to the kickboxing ring at K-1 Beast 2004 in Niigata on March 14, 2004, Esch lost a unanimous decision to Hiromi Amada as Amada peppered him with low kicks while Esch did little more than taunt his opponent throughout the match. He was scheduled to fight Bob Sapp soon afterwards, but claims that Sapp's management withdrew their fighter after discovering that Amada had needed hospital treatment after his bout with Esch. Butterbean lost his third consecutive K-1 match at K-1 Beast 2004 in Shizuoka on June 26, 2004, losing to 210.82 cm (6 ft 11.00 in) giant Montanha Silva by unanimous decision.

Competing in the eight-man tournament at the K-1 World Grand Prix 2005 in Hawaii in Honolulu on July 29, 2005, Esch put an end to his losing streak when he scored a third round standing eight count en route to a unanimous decision victory over 150 kg (330 lb) brawler Marcus Royster in the quarterfinals. Despite the win, Esch sustained an injury to his left leg during the fight and could not continue and so Royster was entered back into the tournament in his place.

=== Professional wrestling (1997, 1999, 2009–2012) ===
Esch appeared twice in World Wrestling Federation professional wrestling events, competing in boxing matches both times. On December 7, 1997, at the D-Generation X: In Your House pay-per-view event, he defeated former Golden Gloves champion Marc Mero via disqualification in a worked match by hitting Butterbean with a wooden stool. 15 months later, Esch defeated WWF Brawl For All champion Bart Gunn in a legitimate shootfight at WrestleMania XV on March 28, 1999, knocking his opponent out in 34 seconds.

In 2009 he returned to professional wrestling on the independent circuit. He defeated Trent Acid for the Pro Wrestling Syndicate Heavyweight title on May 29, 2009, in Garfield, New Jersey. On June 10, 2009, Esch defeated One Man Kru at OmegaCon at the BJCC in Birmingham, Alabama, at a wrestling event for charity. Nearly a year later he dropped to the title to Kevin Matthews on May 9, 2010. Also, he wrestled for Juggalo Championship Wrestling. On April 1, 2011, Esch teamed with Officer Adam Hadder in a tag-team match against One Man Kru and WWE Hall of Famer Brutus "The Barber" Beefcake in a charity wrestling event taped for an episode of Big Law: Deputy Butterbean, a reality show which aired on Investigation Discovery. On March 31, 2012, he defeated Cliff Compton at the event WrestleRama Guyana in Georgetown, Guyana.

=== Pride Fighting Championships (2006–2007) ===
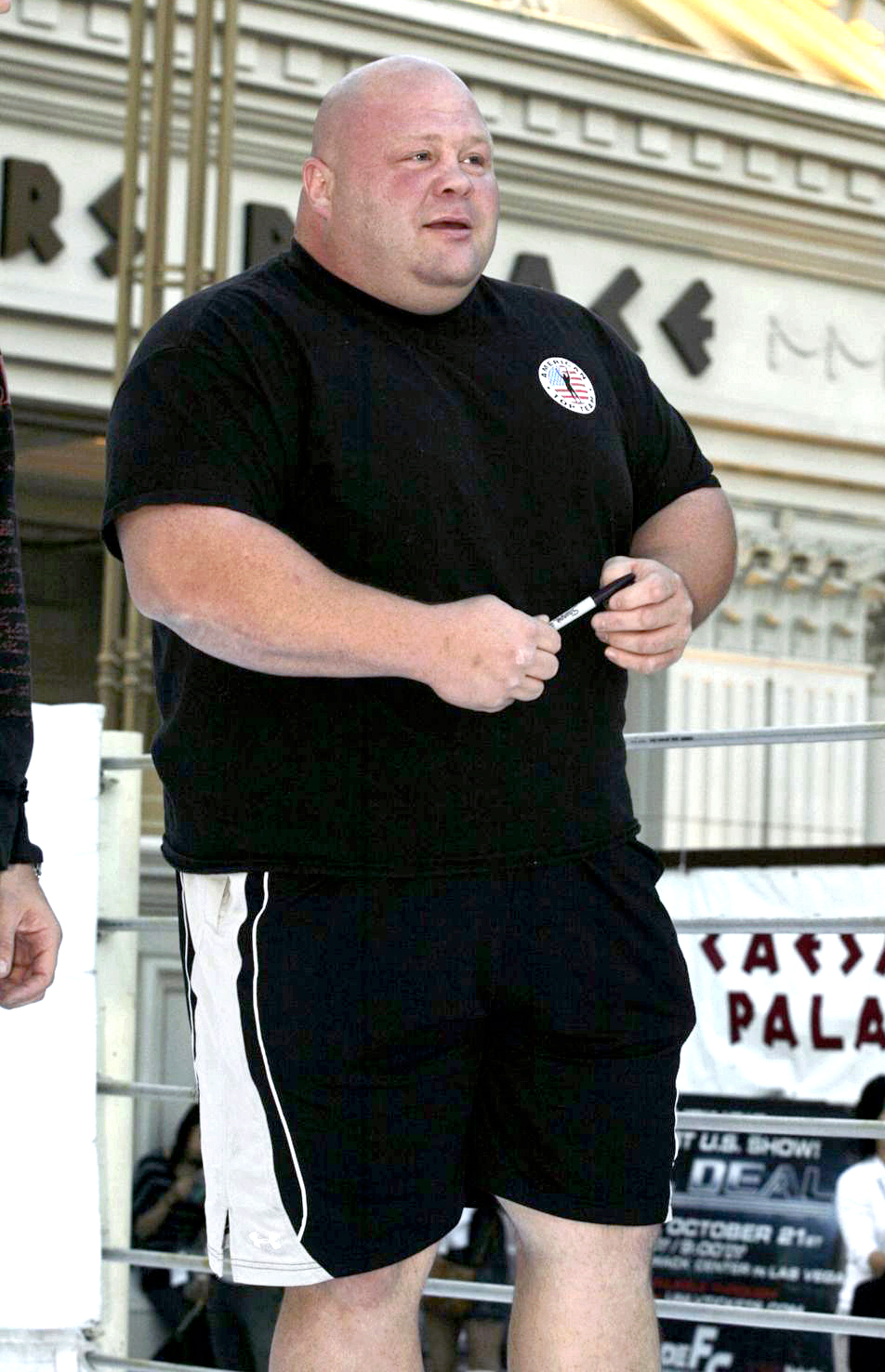
Esch before Pride 32 in October 2006

Having lost his MMA debut to Genki Sudo, Esch stuck with the sport and regrouped, going 6–0–1 in appearances in King of the Cage, Gracie Fightfest, and Rumble on the Rock which included a TKO stoppage of Wesley "Cabbage" Correira at Rumble on the Rock 8 in Honolulu on January 20, 2006, in a fight which took place under special rules, ground fighting being limited to fifteen seconds per instance regardless of the situation. He returned to Japan with the Pride Fighting Championships on August 26, 2006, to compete at Pride Bushido 12 in Nagoya against Ikuhisa Minowa, a shoot wrestler known for his willingness to face much larger opponents, to whom he lost via armbar submission at 4:25 of round one.

Esch was set to fight Mark Hunt at the promotion's first North American show, Pride 32, in Las Vegas on October 21, 2006, but the Nevada State Athletic Commission would not allow the match-up as they argued that Hunt's wins over Wanderlei Silva and Mirko "Cro Cop" Filipović gave him an unfair mat advantage. Pride had stated that "visa issues" were preventing Hunt from competing in the bout, but it was later confirmed that Hunt could not compete due to the NSAC's ruling. Pro wrestler Sean O'Haire stepped in as Hunt's replacement and Esch TKO'd him in under thirty seconds.

Departing Pride briefly to compete in Cage Rage, Esch submitted to strikes from Rob Broughton in the second round of their contest at Cage Rage 19 in London, England, on December 9, 2006. He then rebounded with a forty-three second knockout of James Thompson at Cage Rage 20 on February 10, 2007.

Esch returned to Pride for the promotion's last event, Pride 34 in Saitama on April 8, 2007, where he faced Zuluzinho in a bout where both men weighed in at 184.6 kg (407 lb) (although the Brazilian was 20 cm (8 in) taller). Both fighters came out swinging before Zuluzinho scored a takedown. Esch reversed him, landing several hammer shots before finally submitting Zuluzinho with a key lock at 2:35 of the opening round.

=== Later career (2007–2013) ===
Esch's next fight was on July 14, 2007, against reigning Cage Rage World Heavyweight Champion Tengiz Tedoradze in a non-title bout at Cage Rage 25, losing via TKO. Global Fighting Championships had scheduled a main event bout between Esch and Ruben Villareal for their inaugural event, but the event was canceled when half the scheduled matchups could not take place due to medical issues (Esch vs. Villareal was the only viable main event). He was then set to fight Jimmy Ambriz as the main event of Xcess Fighting's debut card, but was a no show for the weigh-in citing scheduling conflicts.

Esch made a brief return to K-1 to fight at the K-1 World Grand Prix 2008 in Hawaii on August 9, 2008, rematching Wesley Correira in the quarterfinals and losing via a second-round high kick KO.

Esch lost via first-round KO for the EBF title against Mark Potter at the Syndicate Nightclub in Blackpool, England, on September 14, 2008. This fight has not been recorded on boxrec.com or any other site of the same nature, as Potter was not licensed at the time.

Esch made his independent professional wrestling debut at the Birmingham–Jefferson Civic Center in Birmingham, Alabama, on March 28, 2009, at the ImagiCon horror movie, sci-fi movie, and comic book convention and was victorious against rapper/professional wrestler/film maker/actor Anthony "One Man Kru" Sanners via pinfall after smashing him with a vicious 400 lb elbow drop. Esch won the Pro Wrestling Syndicate Heavyweight Championship on May 29, 2009, after defeating Trent Acid. Esch lost in a first round TKO (submission) to Jeff Kugel on March 6, 2010, in Mount Clemens, Michigan, in an MMA bout for Xtreme Cagefighting Championship 46: Beatdown at the Ballroom 9 in a devastating :40 second pummeling.

Esch lost the belt to Kevin Matthews on May 8, 2010, in White Plains, New York.

In his final kickboxing match at Moosin II in Seoul, South Korea, on July 29, 2009, Esch KO'd Moon-bi Lam forty-six seconds into round one.

On October 3, 2009, Esch lost a four-round split decision to Harry Funmaker whom he earlier beat on two occasions. After the bout he announced his retirement. He seemingly changed his mind, however, and soon returned to competition.

On September 18, 2010, Esch was defeated by Mariusz Pudzianowski by submission due to strikes at KSW XIV in Łódź, Poland. After several exchanges of strikes on the feet, Pudzianowski attacked and took Esch down, proceeding to throw numerous punches from side control in a ground-and-pound attack. Esch, unable to get to his feet, submitted at just 1:15 into the first round.

Esch next took on up-and-coming super heavyweight Deon West at the LFC 43: Wild Thang MMA internet pay-per-view on October 12, 2010. After a heated contest, Deon did not rise for the third round. Butterbean humbled Deon West via TKO at 5:00 of round two.

On April 1, 2011, Esch returned to pro wrestling and teamed with his Walker County Sheriff Deputy partner Adam Hadder to take on Brutus "The Barber" Beefcake and One Man Kru in a tag-team match at the Battle Against Drugs charity benefit which was taped for Esch's reality show Big Law. He appeared in February 2012 at Wrestlerama in Georgetown, Guyana, where on entering the ring he told the crowd Guyana is his second home and was booed off because he mispronounced "Guyana".

Esch defeated Dean Storey at Elite 1 MMA: High Voltage on May 7, 2011, in Moncton, New Brunswick, Canada, to claim the promotions super heavyweight title. He knocked out Storey 24 seconds into the second round. Many people have compared Esch to British warrior "Big" Ben Copley, with similar stature and size. The two were scheduled to meet in a 6-round contest, with Copley ultimately stepping down due to being what he called himself a "bottle job". After this, Esch ultimately retired from competition, stating that a fight with bottle job Copley would bring him out of retirement.

=== Retirement (2013–present) ===
In retirement, Esch's health deteriorated. He suffered from intense pain coupled with severely impaired mobility. Even with the assistance of crutches, Esch struggled to walk. The pain necessitated that he attended conventions in a wheelchair.

Esch has also spent time becoming an artisan woodworker, making handmade items such as razors, pens, and other custom items. In 2018, Esch opened a family-run restaurant in Jasper, Alabama, called Mr. Bean's BBQ.

In 2022, Esch began working with former wrestler and life coach Diamond Dallas Page to improve his health. As a result of his progress with Page's DDP Yoga program, Esch's weight dropped below 300 lbs (136 kg) for the first time in decades. The weight loss enabled Esch to qualify for surgery to repair a semi-fused hip. Since his successful hip surgery in 2022, Esch has openly expressed a desire to return to professional boxing, although none of his proposed matches (including fights with Jake Paul and Mike Tyson) have any official plans to take place. In 2024, DDP Yoga released Butterbean's Comeback – One More Fight, a video montage chronicling Esch's achievements and transformative recovery.

On 9 March 2025, it was announced that Butterbean would wrestle Minoru Suzuki as part of the 2025 WrestleCon Mark Hitchcock Memorial Supershow on 17 April 2025 at the Palms Casino Resort in Las Vegas, with Dan Severn serving as Special Guest Enforcer. The fight ended in a double count-out.

== Other media ==
=== Big Law: Deputy Butterbean ===
Esch is a reserve deputy sheriff in his hometown of Jasper, Alabama. He starred in the reality television documentary entitled Big Law: Deputy Butterbean, which aired on the Investigation Discovery channel in 2011. Esch described the genesis of the show:

They came to me wanting to do a reality documentary on my restaurant and I was in the process of closing my restaurant down. I said "If you want something interesting and fun to watch, follow us on our drug busts in the sheriff's department." They agreed people would be interested in this. "They started following us, filming it and documenting us actually making the busts. You arrest somebody and say "Look, if you don't want to go to jail you've got to help us bust a bigger guy." We make a bigger bust from that. The whole goal is to get people on file and lessen the number of criminals on the streets.

Esch hoped the show would help the cause of law enforcement:

I think this show is going to prove that people really care about the communities they lived in. There's going to be more people calling (the police station) saying "Hey, this guy is doing this crime. You should look into it." We want people to step forward and help the police clean up our communities.

The show was not renewed for a second season.

=== Film ===
Esch appeared in the film Jackass: The Movie, in a public stunt: an arranged fight with Johnny Knoxville in a department store. Knoxville stated that Esch is actually quite friendly outside of the ring, despite his fearsome ringside demeanor. After the staged fight began, Knoxville fell, got up, was asked by Esch to hit him at least once. Knoxville did so, was easily knocked to the floor by Esch, and received several stitches in his head after the encounter. (The camera appears to show Knoxville snoring, but Knoxville stated in an interview with Vanity Fair that he was actually trying to swallow his tongue as a result of being knocked out.) After waking up, a groggy Knoxville jokingly asked "Is Butterbean OK?"

Esch also appeared in the film Chairman of the Board as the Museum Security Guard with the "chia hair", a fact that is pointed out on the DVD commentary by the film's star Scott "Carrot Top" Thompson.

=== Television ===
Esch appeared on Adult Swim's Squidbillies, where he sang the national anthem, finally beating up a fan for not taking off his hat.

Esch appeared on CMT's Hulk Hogan's Celebrity Championship Wrestling television show, on Team Beefcake.

Esch was referenced on NBC's Parenthood (2010). The episode, which aired on October 5, 2010, was titled "Date Night".

In June 2013, Esch was interviewed in Australia on Fox Sports programme, Monday Nights with Matty Johns.

Esch appeared on TruTV's Friends of the People in a sketch as "Dr. Butterbean", using his sweet science boxing skills as an anesthesiologist. The Season 2 Episode 7 was called "Great White Haters"..

On September 22, 2022, Esch appeared on an episode of Celebrity Family Feud titled "The Cast of Jackass", as part of the Tremaine family, competing against the Knoxville family.

On January 2, 2024, Esch joined the cast of Moonshiners on the Discovery Channel, helping moonshiner Josh Owens recover after a motorcycle accident.

=== Radio ===
On July 16, 2005, Esch fought Dieter of Rover's Morning Glory, in downtown Cleveland, Ohio, in a bout billed as "War on the Shore".

=== Video games ===
Esch was featured on the cover of, and was the final boss character in, the EA Sports game Toughman Contest, released in 1995 for the Sega Genesis and Sega 32X. He also appeared as a playable character in all of the EA Sports boxing video games in the Knockout Kings series. In the 2007 PC game The Witcher, the main character can challenge a tavern fistfighter (with a body structure similar to that of Esch) by the name of Butter Bean during the second chapter of the game. Esch is a playable fighter in EA's fifth installment of the Fight Night series Fight Night Champion. Esch was added as a playable fighter to the game Undisputed as part of downloadable content on 2 April 2025.

== Personal life ==
Esch is married to Libby Gaskin and has three children: sons Brandon and Caleb, and daughter Grace. Both of his sons used to be mixed martial artists. He also has eight grandchildren.

Having competed at weights of 378 to 425 lbs (171.5–192.5 kg), Esch revealed in June 2024 he had slimmed down from 515 lbs to 303.8 lbs (233.6 kg to 137.8 kg).

== Championships and awards ==
=== Boxing ===
- International Boxing Association
  - IBA World Super Heavyweight (+95.2 kg/210 lb) Championship (one time)
- Rochester Boxing Hall of Fame
  - 2023 inductee
  - 2023 Perseverance Award
- World Athletic Association
  - WAA World Heavyweight (+90.7 kg/200 lb) Championship (one time)

=== Mixed martial arts ===
- Elite-1 MMA
  - Elite-1 MMA Super Heavyweight (+120.2 kg/265 lb) Championship (one time)

=== Professional wrestling ===
- Pro Wrestling Syndicate
  - Pro Wrestling Syndicate Heavyweight Championship (one time)

=== MTV Movie Awards ===
- 2003: nominated for best fight
  - Johnny Knoxville vs. Butterbean – Jackass: The Movie

== Professional boxing record ==
91 fights	77 wins	10 losses
By knockout	57	2
By decision	19	8
By disqualification	1	0
Draws	4	

No.	Result	Record	Opponent	Type	Round, time	Date	Location	Notes
91	Loss	77–10–4	Kirk Lawton	RTD	2 (4), 3:00	Jun 29, 2013	Newcastle Entertainment Centre, Newcastle, New South Wales, Australia	
90	Loss	77–9–4	Curt Allan	UD	4	Jan 13, 2012	Horseshoe Casino, Elizabeth, Indiana, U.S.	
89	Loss	77–8–4	Harry Funmaker	SD	4	Oct 3, 2009	U.S. Cellular Arena, Milwaukee, Wisconsin, U.S.	
88	Win	77–7–4	Joe Siciliano	TKO	2 (4), 1:10	Mar 9, 2007	Worcester Palladium, Worcester, Massachusetts, U.S.	
87	Win	76–7–4	Joaquin Garcia	KO	1 (4), 0:48	Dec 16, 2006	Civic Center, Saginaw, Michigan, U.S.	
86	Win	75–7–4	Ed White	TKO	1 (4), 1:46	Sep 23, 2006	Belterra Casino Resort & Spa, Florence, Indiana, U.S.	
85	Win	74–7–4	Daniel White	UD	4	Mar 24, 2006	Wing's Stadium, Kalamazoo, Michigan, U.S.	
84	Loss	73–7–4	Baden Oui	MD	4	Nov 18, 2005	Sports Complex, Carrara, Gold Coast, Queensland, Australia	
83	Loss	73–6–4	George Linberger	SD	4	Oct 15, 2005	Chapparells, Akron, Ohio, U.S.	For NABC super heavyweight title
82	Loss	73–5–4	Kenny Craven	UD	4	Aug 20, 2005	Capital Gym, Beijing, China	
81	Win	73–4–4	Rick Zufall	KO	3 (4), 2:39	Aug 9, 2005	Camp Pendleton, Oceanside, California, U.S.	
80	Loss	72–4–4	Kenny Craven	MD	4	Mar 14, 2005	Mississippi Coliseum, Jackson, Mississippi, U.S.	
79	Win	72–3–4	Kenny Craven	TKO	3 (4), 1:23	Feb 12, 2005	Magnolia Center, Laurel, Mississippi, U.S.	
78	Win	71–3–4	Brian McIntyre	UD	4	Nov 20, 2004	Mid-America Center, Council Bluffs, Iowa, U.S.	
77	Win	70–3–4	Richie Goosehead	MD	4	Sep 24, 2004	Convention Centre, Winnipeg, Manitoba, Canada	
76	Win	69–3–4	Salvador Farnetti	TKO	1 (4), 0:50	Jul 22, 2004	HP Pavilion, San Jose, California, U.S.	
75	Win	68–3–4	Marcelo Aravena	SD	4	May 15, 2004	4 Bears Casino & Lodge, New Town, North Dakota, U.S.	
74	Win	67–3–4	Rodney Phillips	KO	2 (4), 1:49	May 8, 2004	Coast Coliseum, Biloxi, Mississippi, U.S.	
73	Win	66–3–4	Troy Roberts	TKO	1 (4)	Jun 13, 2003	Chinook Winds Casino, Lincoln City, Oregon, U.S.	
72	Draw	65–3–4	Lewis Gilbert	SD	4	Mar 28, 2003	Alario Center, Westwego, Louisiana, U.S.	
71	Loss	65–3–3	Larry Holmes	UD	10	Jul 27, 2002	Norfolk Scope, Norfolk, Virginia, U.S.	
70	Win	65–2–3	Craig Wolfley	KO	4 (4)	Feb 2, 2002	Grand Casino, Gulfport, Mississippi, U.S.	
69	Win	64–2–3	Kevin Tallon	UD	4	Dec 12, 2001	Caesar's Casino, Elizabeth, Indiana, U.S.	
68	Loss	63–2–3	Billy Zumbrun	MD	4	Aug 19, 2001	Stateline Casino, West Wendover, Nevada, U.S.	
67	Win	63–1–3	Shane Woollas	TKO	1 (4), 2:38	Jun 16, 2001	Wembley Conference Centre, London, England	
66	Win	62–1–3	Tyrone Muex	TKO	2 (8)	Apr 19, 2001	Grand Casino, Tunica, Mississippi, U.S.	
65	Draw	61–1–3	Abdul Muhaymin	MD	4	Nov 17, 2000	Coast Coliseum, Biloxi, Mississippi, U.S.	
64	Win	61–1–2	Harry Funmaker	UD	4	Nov 3, 2000	Ho-Chunk Casino, Baraboo, Wisconsin, U.S.	
63	Win	60–1–2	Marcus Rhode	KO	3 (4)	Sep 15, 2000	Pepsi Center, Denver, Colorado, U.S.	
62	Win	59–1–2	Dan Kosmicki	TKO	2 (4)	Jul 28, 2000	Selland Arena, Fresno, California, U.S.	
61	Win	58–1–2	Kerry Biles	KO	2 (4), 2:52	Jun 17, 2000	Staples Center, Los Angeles, California, U.S.	
60	Win	57–1–2	Bill Johnson	KO	2 (4), 2:49	May 19, 2000	Playboy Mansion, Beverly Hills, California, U.S.	
59	Win	56–1–2	Dan Kosmicki	TKO	4 (4), 0:52	May 5, 2000	Convention Centre, Tucson, Arizona, U.S.	
58	Win	55–1–2	George Linberger	TKO	1 (4), 0:19	Mar 4, 2000	Mandalay Bay Events Center, Las Vegas, Nevada, U.S.	Retained IBA super heavyweight title
57	Win	54–1–2	Kevin Tallon	UD	4	Feb 17, 2000	Coeur d'Alene Casino, Worley, Idaho, U.S.	
56	Win	53–1–2	Tim Ray	UD	4	Dec 10, 1999	Grand Casino, Tunica, Mississippi, U.S.	
55	Win	52–1–2	Allen Smith	TKO	2 (4), 2:16	Nov 23, 1999	Allstate Arena, Rosemont, Illinois, U.S.	
54	Win	51–1–2	Melvin Lumzy	KO	3 (4)	Nov 11, 1999	Grand Casino, Biloxi, Mississippi, U.S.	
53	Win	50–1–2	George Chamberlain	TKO	3 (4), 1:25	Oct 21, 1999	Washington Hilton & Towers, Washington, D.C., U.S.	
52	Win	49–1–2	Kenny Craven	TKO	2 (4), 1:55	Sep 18, 1999	Mandalay Bay Events Center, Las Vegas, Nevada, U.S.	Retained IBA super heavyweight title
51	Draw	48–1–2	Jason Farley	UD	4	Aug 6, 1999	State Fairgrounds, Columbus, Ohio, U.S.	
50	Win	48–1–1	Tim Burgoon	KO	2 (4), 2:00	Jul 31, 1999	Plaza de Toros El Toreo, Tijuana, Mexico	Retained IBA super heavyweight title
49	Win	47–1–1	Peter McNeeley	TKO	1 (4), 2:59	Jun 26, 1999	Mandalay Bay Events Center, Las Vegas, Nevada, U.S.	
48	Win	46–1–1	Russell Chasteen	UD	4	Jun 11, 1999	Texas Motor Speedway, Fort Worth, Texas, U.S.	
47	Win	45–1–1	Jason Hurley	TKO	2 (4)	May 27, 1999	Gold Strike Casino, Tunica, Mississippi, U.S.	
46	Win	44–1–1	Roy Bedwell	UD	4	Apr 16, 1999	Catfish Bend Casino, Burlington, Iowa, U.S.	
45	Win	43–1–1	Kevin Tallon	TKO	3 (4), 2:50	Apr 2, 1999	Convention Center, Chattanooga, Tennessee, U.S.	
44	Win	42–1–1	Patrick Graham	TKO	3 (4), 0:46	Feb 19, 1999	Thomas & Mack Center, Las Vegas, Nevada, U.S.	Retained IBA super heavyweight title
43	Win	41–1–1	Troy Roberts	TKO	3 (4), 0:41	Sep 18, 1998	Thomas & Mack Center, Las Vegas, Nevada, U.S.	
42	Win	40–1–1	Tim Pollard	KO	1 (4), 1:37	Aug 25, 1998	Blue Horizon, Philadelphia, Pennsylvania, U.S.	
41	Win	39–1–1	Billy Eaton	KO	3 (4), 2:38	Mar 23, 1998	Foxwoods Resort, Mashantucket, Connecticut, U.S.	
40	Win	38–1–1	Warrant Williams	KO	1 (4)	Feb 28, 1998	Cincinnati Gardens, Cincinnati, Ohio, U.S.	
39	Win	37–1–1	Harry Funmaker	UD	4	Jan 16, 1998	Bank of America Center, Boise, Idaho, U.S.	Retained IBA super heavyweight title
38	Win	36–1–1	Doug Phillips	UD	4	Dec 6, 1997	Caesars Hotel & Casino, Atlantic City, New Jersey, U.S.	
37	Win	35–1–1	Ken Woods	TKO	4 (4)	Oct 30, 1997	Hilton Hotel, Washington, D.C., U.S.	
36	Draw	34–1–1	Billy Eaton	MD	4	Sep 13, 1997	Thomas & Mack Center, Las Vegas, Nevada, U.S.	
35	Win	34–1	Enrique Ruiz	DQ	4 (4)	Aug 13, 1997	Mountaineer Casino Racetrack and Resort, Chester, West Virginia, U.S.	
34	Win	33–1	Scott Lindecker	KO	4 (4), 1:20	Jul 9, 1997	Emerald Queen Casino, Tacoma, Washington, U.S.	
33	Win	32–1	Jason Farley	UD	4	Jun 15, 1997	Grand Casino, Biloxi, Mississippi, U.S.	
32	Win	31–1	Bill Duncan	KO	2 (4), 1:05	Apr 17, 1997	Adam’s Mark Hotel, Tulsa, Oklahoma, U.S.	
31	Win	30–1	Ed White	TKO	2 (4), 1:14	Apr 12, 1997	Thomas & Mack Center, Las Vegas, Nevada, U.S.	Retained IBA super heavyweight title
30	Win	29–1	Sean Jegen	TKO	3 (4), 1:33	Apr 2, 1997	Station Casino, Kansas City, Missouri, U.S.	
29	Win	28–1	Ken Woods	KO	2 (4)	Mar 22, 1997	Memorial Coliseum, Corpus Christi, Texas, U.S.	
28	Win	27–1	Nick Phillips	UD	4	Feb 12, 1997	The Theater at Madison Square Garden, New York City, New York, U.S.	
27	Win	26–1	Curt Allan	TKO	3 (4), 2:56	Jan 18, 1997	Thomas & Mack Center, Las Vegas, Nevada, U.S.	
26	Win	25–1	Sean Jegen	KO	1 (4), 2:47	Dec 6, 1996	Lawlor Events Center, Reno, Nevada, U.S.	
25	Win	24–1	William Harris	TKO	4 (4)	Jul 10, 1996	Beverly Hilton, Beverly Hills, California, U.S.	
24	Win	23–1	George Clarke	KO	1 (4), 1:54	Jun 7, 1996	Caesars Palace, Las Vegas, Nevada, U.S.	
23	Win	22–1	Jonathan Whitfield	TKO	4 (4), 1:44	May 14, 1996	Foxwoods Resort, Mashantucket, Connecticut, U.S.	
22	Win	21–1	Richard Davis	KO	1 (4), 1:10	Apr 30, 1996	San Antonio, Texas, U.S.	
21	Win	20–1	Jack Ramsey	TKO	1 (4), 1:28	Apr 22, 1996	Prairie Meadows Casino, Altoona, Iowa, U.S.	
20	Win	19–1	James Baker	KO	1 (4), 0:18	Mar 19, 1996	Spruce Goose Dome, Long Beach, California, U.S.	
19	Win	18–1	Billy McDonald	KO	1 (4)	Mar 13, 1996	Olympic Auditorium, Los Angeles, California, U.S.	
18	Win	17–1	Joe Wiggins	TKO	4 (4), 1:03	Feb 25, 1996	Arizona Charlie's, Las Vegas, Nevada, U.S.	
17	Win	16–1	Tim Ray	TKO	2 (4)	Jan 25, 1996	Casino Magic, Bay Saint Louis, Mississippi, U.S.	
16	Loss	15–1	Mitchell Rose	TKO	2 (4), 0:48	Dec 15, 1995	Madison Square Garden, New York City, New York, U.S.	
15	Win	15–0	Louis Monaco	KO	1 (4), 1:58	Dec 1, 1995	Fantasy Springs Casino, Indio, California, U.S.	
14	Win	14–0	Pat Jackson	RTD	3 (4), 3:00	Oct 25, 1995	Pontchartrain Center, Kenner, Louisiana, U.S.	
13	Win	13–0	Kenneth Myers	MD	4	Sep 29, 1995	Buffalo Bill's, Stateline, Nevada, U.S.	
12	Win	12–0	Anthony Hunt	TKO	2 (4)	Sep 16, 1995	Ross County Fairgrounds, Chillicothe, Ohio, U.S.	
11	Win	11–0	Adam Sutton	MD	4	Sep 9, 1995	Caesars Palace, Las Vegas, Nevada, U.S.	
10	Win	10–0	Paul Springer	KO	1 (4), 0:47	Aug 15, 1995	Arizona Charlie's, Las Vegas, Nevada, U.S.	
9	Win	9–0	Doug Norris	KO	2 (4), 1:19	Jul 28, 1995	Casino Magic, Bay Saint Louis, Mississippi, U.S.	
8	Win	8–0	Rogelio Ramirez	KO	1 (4)	Jun 18, 1995	Las Cruces, New Mexico, U.S.	
7	Win	7–0	James Robinson	TKO	2 (4)	Apr 21, 1995	Marshall Street Armory, Lansing, Michigan, U.S.	
6	Win	6–0	Jerry Michelson	KO	1 (4)	Apr 15, 1995	Owensboro Sportscenter, Owensboro, Kentucky, U.S.	
5	Win	5–0	Alvin Ellis	TKO	1 (4)	Mar 31, 1995	Joe Louis Arena, Detroit, Michigan, U.S.	
4	Win	4–0	Juan Ramon Perez	UD	4	Mar 11, 1995	Tingley Coliseum, Albuquerque, New Mexico, U.S.	
3	Win	3–0	Ed Barry	PTS	6	Mar 1, 1995	Civic Center, Saginaw, Michigan, U.S.	
2	Win	2–0	Doug Norris	RTD	3 (6), 3:00	Nov 30, 1994	Imperial Ballroom, New Orleans, Louisiana, U.S.	
1	Win	1–0	Tim Daniels	PTS	4	Oct 15, 1994	Birmingham, Alabama, U.S.	

== Kickboxing record ==
Kickboxing record
3 wins (2 KOs), 4 losses, 0 draws
Date	Result	Opponent	Event	Location	Method	Round	Time	Record
2009-07-29	Win	(South Korea) Moon Bo-Lam	Moosin II	Seoul, South Korea	KO (right hook)	1	0:46	3–4
2008-08-09	Loss	(United States) Wesley Correira	K-1 World Grand Prix 2008 in Hawaii, Quarter Finals	Honolulu, Hawaii, US	KO (left high kick)	2	0:53	2–4
2005-07-29	Win	(United States) Marcus Royster	K-1 World Grand Prix 2005 in Hawaii, Quarter Finals	Honolulu, Hawaii, US	Decision (unanimous)	3	3:00	2–3
2004-06-26	Loss	(Brazil) Montanha Silva	K-1 Beast 2004 in Shizuoka	Shizuoka, Japan	Decision (unanimous)	3	3:00	1–3
2004-03-14	Loss	(Japan) Hiromi Amada	K-1 Beast 2004 in Niigata	Niigata, Japan	Decision (unanimous)	3	3:00	1–2
2003-09-21	Loss	(South Africa) Mike Bernardo	K-1 Survival 2003 Japan Grand Prix Final	Yokohama, Japan	KO (right high kick)	2	1:01	1–1
2003-06-29	Win	(Japan) Yusuke Fujimoto	K-1 Beast II 2003	Saitama, Japan	KO (left hook)	1	1:02	1–0
Legend: Win Loss Draw/no contest Notes

== Mixed martial arts record ==
Professional record breakdown
26 matches	15 wins	10 losses
By knockout	8	7
By submission	7	3
Draws	1	

Res.	Record	Opponent	Method	Event	Date	Round	Time	Location	Notes
Loss	15–10–1	Sandy Bowman	TKO (submission to punches)	Prestige Fighting Championship 3	October 21, 2011	1	0:54	Fort McMurray, Alberta, Canada	
Loss	15–9–1	Eric Barrak	Submission (guillotine choke)	Instinct MMA 1	October 7, 2011	3	2:56	Montreal, Quebec, Canada	
Win	15–8–1	Dean Storey	TKO (punches)	Elite-1 MMA: Moncton	May 7, 2011	2	0:24	Moncton, New Brunswick, Canada	Wins the Elite-1 MMA Super Heavyweight Championship.
Win	14–8–1	Deon West	TKO (punches)	LFC 43: Wild Thang	December 10, 2010	2	5:00	Indianapolis, Indiana, United States	
Loss	13–8–1	Mariusz Pudzianowski	TKO (submission to punches)	KSW 14: Judgment Day	September 18, 2010	1	1:16	Łódź, Poland	
Loss	13–7–1	Jeff Kugel	TKO (submission to punches)	Xtreme Cagefighting Championship 46: Beatdown at the Ballroom 9	March 6, 2010	1	0:40	Mount Clemens, Michigan, United States	For the XCC Super Heavyweight Championship.
Win	13–6–1	Chris Cruit	Submission (rear-naked choke)	Moosin: God of Martial Arts	December 11, 2009	1	1:38	Birmingham, Alabama, United States	
Win	12–6–1	Tom Howard	Submission (neck crank)	Extreme Cage Fighting	September 9, 2009	1	1:40	Laredo, Texas, United States	
Win	11–6–1	Jefferson Hook	TKO (punches)	Lockdown in Lowell	June 26, 2009	1	?:??	Lowell, Indiana, United States	
Loss	10–6–1	Pat Smith	TKO (submission to punches and elbows)	YAMMA Pit Fighting	April 11, 2008	1	3:17	Atlantic City, New Jersey. United States	
Loss	10–5–1	Nick Penner	TKO (submission to punches)	The Fight Club: First Blood	December 28, 2007	1	2:28	Edmonton, Alberta, Canada	
Loss	10–4–1	Tengiz Tedoradze	TKO (punches)	Cage Rage 22	July 14, 2007	1	4:26	London, England	
Win	10–3–1	Zuluzinho	Submission (keylock)	Pride 34	April 8, 2007	1	2:35	Saitama, Japan	
Win	9–3–1	James Thompson	KO (punches)	Cage Rage 20	February 10, 2007	1	0:43	London, England	
Win	8–3–1	Charles Hodges	KO (punch)	Palace Fighting Championship: King of the Ring	January 18, 2007	1	0:45	Lemoore, California, United States	
Loss	7–3–1	Rob Broughton	TKO (submission to punches)	Cage Rage 19	December 9, 2006	2	3:43	London, England	
Win	7–2–1	Sean O'Haire	KO (punches)	Pride 32 - The Real Deal	October 21, 2006	1	0:29	Las Vegas, Nevada, United States	
Loss	6–2–1	Ikuhisa Minowa	Submission (armbar)	Pride - Bushido 12	August 26, 2006	1	4:25	Nagoya, Japan	
Win	6–1–1	Rich Weeks	Submission (choke)	Fightfest 5: Korea vs. USA	July 15, 2006	1	1:29	McAllen, Texas, United States	
Win	5–1–1	Matt Eckerle	TKO (submission to punches)	Fightfest 4	May 20, 2006	1	0:56	Corpus Christi, Texas, United States	
Win	4–1–1	Aaron Aguilera	Submission (rear-naked choke)	Rumble on the Rock 9	April 21, 2006	2	1:15	Honolulu, Hawaii, United States	
Win	3–1–1	Leo Sylvest	Submission (rear-naked choke)	Fightfest 2: Global Domination	April 14, 2006	1	0:35	Canton, Ohio, United States	
Win	2–1–1	Wesley Correira	TKO (doctor stoppage)	Rumble on the Rock 8	January 20, 2006	2	5:00	Honolulu, Hawaii, United States	Correira broke his arm.
Win	1–1–1	Walley Keenboom	Submission	Fightfest 1: Royce Gracie Fightfest	December 9, 2005	1	2:37	Evansville, Indiana, United States	
Draw	0–1–1	Michael Buchkovich	Draw	KOTC 48: Payback	February 25, 2005	2	5:00	Cleveland, Ohio, United States	
Loss	0–1	Genki Sudo	Submission (heel hook)	K-1 PREMIUM 2003 Dynamite!!	December 31, 2003	2	0:41	Nagoya, Japan	

Preceded by Ed White	IBA super heavyweight champion April 12, 1997 – 2000 (vacated)	Succeeded by
