= Fight Night (video game series) =

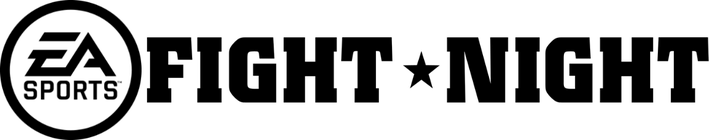
- Genre: Sports (boxing)
- Publisher: EA Sports
- Platforms: PlayStation 2, Xbox, GameCube, PlayStation 3, Xbox 360, PlayStation Portable, iOS
- First release: Fight Night 2004; April 5, 2004
- Latest release: Fight Night Champion; March 1, 2011

Fight Night is a series of boxing video games created by EA Sports. It follows on from their previous series Knockout Kings, produced for various platforms yearly between 1998 and 2003. The series was well received critically, with the PS3 version of Fight Night Round 4 achieving a Metacritic score of 88/100, and several of the games topping sales charts.

On October 20, 2026, EA Sports officially announced the return of Fight Night on X.

== Games ==
Overview over titles in the series
Title	Release Year	PS2	Xbox	GC	X360	PS3	PSP	iOS	Notes
Fight Night 2004	2004	Yes	Yes	No	No	No	No	No	
Fight Night Round 2	2005	Yes	Yes	Yes	No	No	No	No	
Fight Night Round 3	2006	Yes	Yes	No	Yes	Yes	Yes	No	
Fight Night Round 4	2009	No	No	No	Yes	Yes	No	No	
Fight Night Champion	2011	No	No	No	Yes	Yes	No	Yes	

== See also ==
- Foes of Ali
- Knockout Kings
- FaceBreaker
- EA Sports UFC
