= Black Ops Entertainment =

American mobile app developer

- Industry: Video games
- Founded: 1994
- Defunct: 2019
- Fate: Game studio shut down in 2006; continued as app developer until 2019.
- Headquarters: Santa Monica, California, United States
- Key people: John Botti
- Products: Video games Mobile apps
- Number of employees: 30 (2002)
- Website: blackops.com

Black Ops Entertainment was an American video game and mobile app developer located in Santa Monica, California. From 1994 it developed sixteen games for several platforms, including the PlayStation, Nintendo 64, PlayStation 2, GameCube, and Xbox. After the games team was shut down in 2006, founder John Botti continued to use the name while developing stock trading apps for iOS and Android. The last of these was aiTrader in 2019.

== History ==
The company was founded by four MIT graduates in 1994, who developed a SNES Volleyball prototype. Virgin Games contracted them to produce Agile Warrior, which necessitated recruiting a larger team. Initially developing out of their homes, the studio later established their Santa Monica office.

Black Ops became known for their line of sports titles, including their contributions to the NCAA Basketball series. The developer received an AIAS award in 2000, with Knockout Kings 2000 winning console sports game of the year. In the early 2000s, Black Ops released two street basketball titles; Street Hoops and AND 1 Streetball. The decision to move to street basketball as opposed to continuing with NCAA came from a desire to be able to develop "unique play styles with no rules", and avoid the need for permission from the NCAA. The team size peaked at 30 developers during the development of Street Hoops in 2002.

The video game studio shut down in 2006, though John Botti continued producing iOS and Android apps under the moniker such as iTraderPro (2011) and aiTrader (2019).

== Titles ==
=== Games ===
Year	Title	Platform(s)	Publisher
1995	Agile Warrior F-111X	PC, PS1	Virgin Interactive
1996	Black Dawn	PS1, Saturn	Virgin Interactive
1997	Treasures of the Deep	PS1	Namco/Sony Computer Entertainment
1999	Knockout Kings	PS1, N64	EA Sports
1999	Warpath: Jurassic Park	PS1	EA Games/DreamWorks Interactive
1999	007: Tomorrow Never Dies	PS1	EA Games/MGM Interactive
1999	NCAA March Madness 2000	PS1	EA Sports
2000	007: The World Is Not Enough	PS1	EA Games
2000	Knockout Kings 2001	PS1, PS2	EA Sports
2000	NCAA March Madness 2001	PS1	EA Sports
2002	Knockout Kings 2002	PS2, Xbox	EA Sports
2002	Street Hoops	PS2, Xbox, GameCube	Activision
2003	Terminator 3: Rise of the Machines	PS2, Xbox	Atari
2003	America's 10 Most Wanted	PC, PS2	Encore Software/Play-It
2004	The X-Files: Resist or Serve	PS2	Vivendi Universal Games
2006	AND 1 Streetball	PS2, Xbox	Ubisoft

=== Apps ===
- ITrader Pro (2011)
- Avattire (2014)
- Californiageddon (2017)
- Ace Driver (2018)
- aiTrader (2019)
