= Chardon High School =

Public high school in Chardon, Ohio, United States

Location
- 151 Chardon Avenue; Chardon, Ohio 44024; United States
- Coordinates: 41°35′28″N 81°12′1″W

Information
- Type: Public
- Opened: 1908
- School district: Chardon Local School District
- NCES School ID: 390471802789
- Principal: Adam Tomco
- Teaching staff: 48.67 (on FTE basis)
- Grades: 8–12
- Enrollment: 1,054 (2024–25)
- Student to teacher ratio: 21.66
- Colors: Red and black
- Athletics conference: Chagrin Valley Conference
- Team name: Hilltoppers
- Accreditation: Ohio Department of Education
- Website: www.chardon.k12.oh.us/chardonhighschool_home.aspx
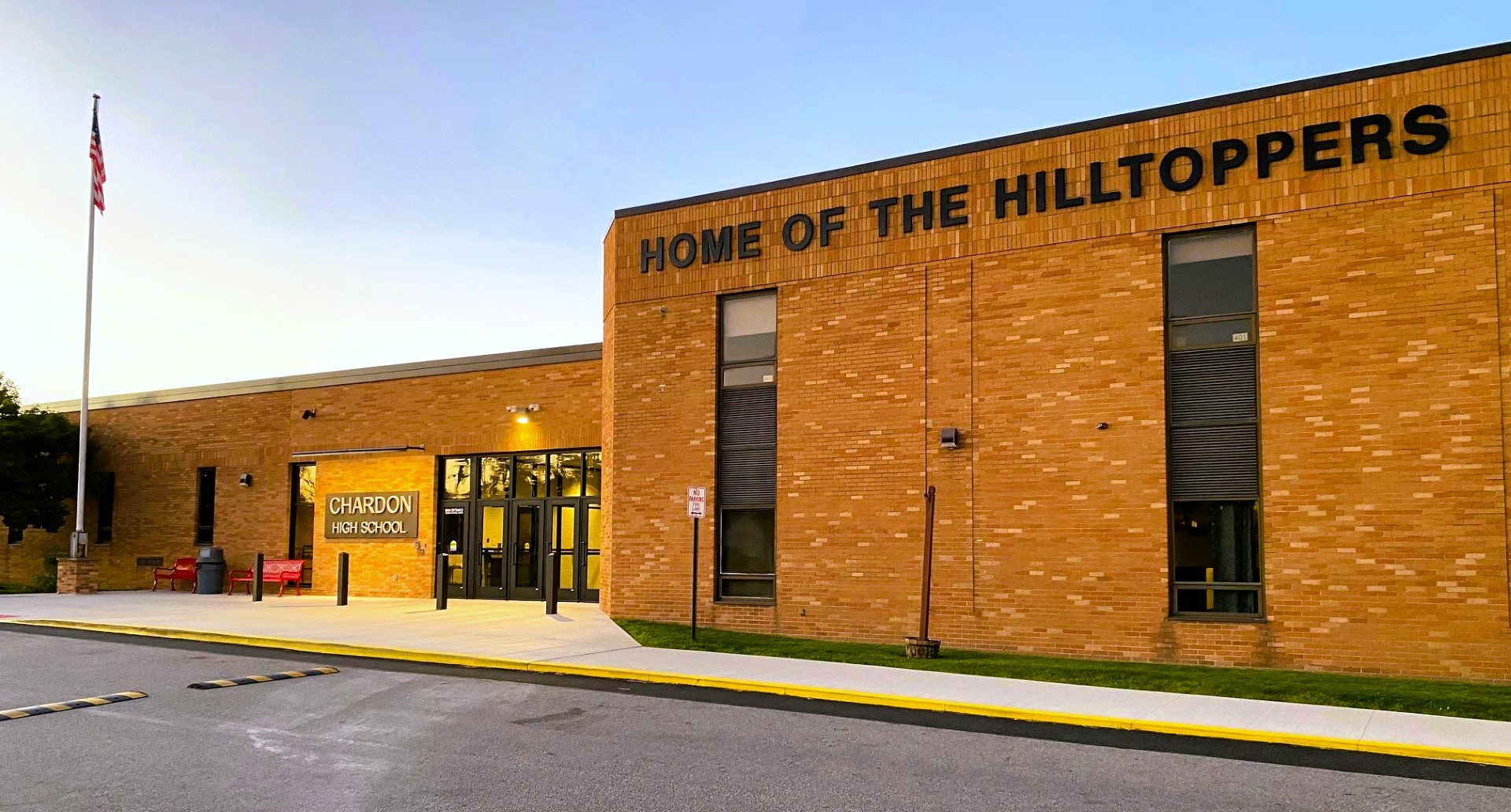

Chardon High School is a public high school in Chardon, Ohio, It is the only high school Chardon Local School District. Their nickname is the Hilltoppers and they compete in the Chagrin Valley Conference as a member of the Ohio High School Athletic Association.

== History ==
Opened in 1908, Chardon High School serves students grades 9-12.

Chardon High Schools original high school building was built in 1908. It was later demolished in 1984. Park Elementary school currently sits at its former site.

The current high school was built in 1951, originally as an elementary school, with later additions in the 50s, 60s and 70s. a levy was on the ballot for Chardon in 2019 to build a new $76 million new 6-12 building but was later rejected.

2012 Chardon High School Shooting

On February 27, 2012, six students were shot at the school by 17-year-old T.J. Lane. According to local news reports, the six victims were chosen at random, countering early reports that a group of students were targeted. Three of the victims died. All Chardon local schools were immediately closed following the shooting, while the high school was put under a lock-down procedure. The entire school district was closed on Tuesday, February 28. The district board also canceled classes in all schools until Friday, with numerous counseling services available until then. On March 19, 2013, Lane was given three life sentences, one for each of the victims killed in the shooting.

== Academics ==
In U.S. News & World Report's 2022 ranking of best high schools, Chardon ranked 97th among Ohio high schools. As of 2021, the school had a graduation rate of 97.8% with about 230 students graduating.

Advanced Placement classes are offered in Physics, English, Statistics, Precalculus, Seminar, AB Calculus, BC Calculus, Chemistry, American History, American Government, European History, Computer Science, French, and Spanish.

=== Envirothon ===
The Chardon High School Envirothon team has competed for many years. At the 2017 Ohio Envirothon Competition earning 1st place in the state and in 2022 placed 2nd overall and 1st in forestry.

== Athletics ==
Chardon High School currently offers:

- Baseball
- Basketball
- Cheerleading
- Cross country
- Golf
- Football
- Lacrosse
- Tennis
- Track and field
- Soccer
- Softball
- Volleyball
- Wrestling

=== State championships ===
- Football - 1994, 2020, 2021
- Girls Cross country - 1978, 1979
- Boys Cross country - 1972
- Baseball - 2022

== Notable alumni ==
- Leroy Kemp - former wrestler
- George Linberger - former professional football player, boxer and business owner
- Jake Kouwe - founder of The Chardon Polka Band
- Joe Madsen - former professional football player
