= Big Law: Deputy Butterbean =

- Starring: Eric "Butterbean" Esch
- Theme music composer: Gary Kuo
- Country of origin: United States
- Original language: English
- No. of seasons: 1
- No. of episodes: 10

Production
- Executive producers: Cheryl Miller Houser; Lorri Leighton; Thomas Cutler; Bruce David Klein
- Running time: 60 minutes 30 minutes

Original release
- Network: Investigation Discovery (2011)
- Release: August 9 – September 6, 2011

Big Law: Deputy Butterbean is an American reality show that aired for one season, in 2011, on Investigation Discovery. The series follows a former heavyweight boxer, Eric "Butterbean" Esch, who had transitioned to a deputy sheriff in Walker County, Alabama.

== Characters ==
=== Main characters ===
- Eric "Butterbean" Esch
- Adam Hadder
- Steve Smith
- Grace Esch
- Adam Esch
- Libby Esch

== Episodes ==
=== Season 1 (2011) ===
| No. overall | No. in season | Title | Directed by | Written by | Original release date | Prod. code |
|---|---|---|---|---|---|---|
| 1 | 1 | "Bad Influence" | Unknown | Unknown | August 9, 2011 | 001 |
| 2 | 2 | "Reefer Madness" | Unknown | Unknown | August 9, 2011 | 002 |
| 3 | 3 | "Bait and Switch" | Unknown | Unknown | August 16, 2011 | 003 |
| 4 | 4 | "Double Cross" | Unknown | Unknown | August 16, 2011 | 004 |
| 5 | 5 | "Web of Deceit" | Unknown | Unknown | August 23, 2011 | 005 |
| 6 | 6 | "Show Me the Money" | Unknown | Unknown | August 23, 2011 | 006 |
| 7 | 7 | "Vanished" | Unknown | Unknown | August 30, 2011 | 007 |
| 8 | 8 | "Circle of Lies" | Unknown | Unknown | August 30, 2011 | 008 |
| 9 | 9 | "Dangerous Games" | Unknown | Unknown | September 6, 2011 | 009 |
| 10 | 10 | "Under Siege" | Unknown | Unknown | September 6, 2011 | 010 |
