= George Linberger =

American football player and boxer (born 1967)

Personal information
- Nickname: The Terminator
- Born: George Linberger; January 23, 1967 (age 59) Akron, Ohio, U.S.
- Height: 6 ft 3 in (191 cm)
- Weight: 265 lb (120 kg)

Boxing career
- Weight class: Heavyweight
- Stance: Orthodox

Boxing record
- Total fights: 40
- Wins: 29
- Win by KO: 25
- Losses: 9
- Draws: 1
- No contests: 1 Football career

Profile
- Position: Offensive lineman/defensive lineman

Career information
- High school: Chardon (OH)
- College: Toledo
- NFL draft: 1990: undrafted

Career history
- Detroit Lions (1990)*; San Antonio Riders (1991)*; San Antonio Force (1992); Las Vegas Sting (1994); Ohio Valley Greyhounds (2000)
- * Offseason or practice squad member only

Career AFL statistics
- Games played: 12
- Tackles: 7
- Stats at ArenaFan.com

George "The Terminator" Linberger (born January 23, 1967) is an American former professional boxer and football player.

== Early life ==
Linberger attended Chardon High School, where he was an all-conference, all-district, and all-state tight end. He was the team leader in receptions his junior and senior year. He also anchored the defensive line and was recruited by several division one programs before settling on the University of Toledo. He also excelled on the wrestling mat, where he compiled a 56-19 record during his high school career.

== Football career ==
Linberger played college football at the University of Toledo where he was a four-year starter. Linberger was a first team All-Mid-American Conference performer in 1989, team captain 1989, team MVP (1989) as well as a nominee for Mid-American conference player of the year. After graduation and going undrafted he was signed as a free agent by the Detroit Lions. On July 22, 1990, it was reported that he had been waived by the Lions. He then was drafted by the WLAF's San Antonio Riders in the fifth round of the OL draft. He signed with the San Antonio Force of the Arena Football League (AFL) in June 1992 but did not play in any games for them. Linberger played in all 12 games for the Las Vegas Sting of the AFL during the 1994 season. He later played for the Ohio Valley Greyhounds of the Indoor Football League during their 2000 season.

== Boxing career ==
As a boxer, Linberger compiled a record of 29 wins, 9 losses, 1 draw and 1 no contest. Linberger won several minor belts during his career but his biggest victory was gaining revenge against Eric Esch for the NABC super heavyweight title. He also shared the ring with world heavyweight champion Nikolay Valuev, and European Champion Brian Nielsen.

== Post-retirement ==
Linberger is the CEO of the LEAP and SOAR alternative programs located throughout Northeast Ohio that he oversees, owns, and operates . His schools work with students with Behavioral and Learning disabilities between eight locations that work with as many as 600 challenged students each year.

Linberger is married to Angel Linberger (Carl) and has two children: his daughter Ariel and his son George Jr.

== Professional boxing record ==
38 fights	29 wins	9 losses
By knockout	25	7
By decision	4	2

Result	Record	Opponent	Type	Round	Date	Location	Notes
Loss	29-9-1	Joe Mesi	TKO	1 (10)	02/22/2007	Mountaineer Casino Racetrack and Resort, Chester	
Win	29-8-1	Eric Esch	SD	4 (4)	10/15/2005	Chapparells, Akron	
Win	28-8-1	Jeff Yeoman	KO		03/24/2005	Chapparells, Akron	
NC	27-8-1	Russell Chasteen	NC	1	07/30/2004	Freedom Hall State Fairground, Louisville	
Win	27-8-1	Paul Phillips	KO		02/21/2004	Chapparells, Akron	
Win	26-8-1	Kevin Tallon	TKO		01/17/2004	Radisson Hotel, Morgantown	
Win	25-8-1	Gerald Armfield	KO		08/08/2003	Canal Park, Akron	
Loss	24-8-1	Allen Smith	TKO		05/29/2003	Chapparells, Akron	
Win	24-7-1	Gerald Moore	KO		04/26/2003	Delaware County Fairgrounds, Muncie	
Win	23-7-1	Calvin Miller	TKO		08/09/2002	Cheaton's Bingo Hall, Akron	
Win	22-7-1	Tim Ray	TKO	6 (12)	06/01/2002	Bel Air Community Center, Akron	
Win	21-7-1	Kevin Tallon	TKO		03/15/2002	Bel Air Community Center, Akron	
Win	20-7-1	Abdul Muhaymin	UD		12/06/2001	Akron	
Loss	19-7-1	Nikolai Valuev	TKO		06/30/2001	Trump Taj Mahal, Atlantic City	
Win	19-6-1	Brian Yates	PTS		04/05/2001	Mountaineer Casino Racetrack and Resort, Chester	
Loss	18-6-1	Troy Weida	TKO		11/18/2000		
Loss	18-5-1	Eric Esch	TKO		03/04/2000	Mandalay Bay Resort & Casino, Las Vegas	
Draw	18-4-1	Mike McGrady	PTS		11/24/1999	St. John's Arena, Steubenville	
Win	18-4	Mike DeVito	TKO		09/16/1999	Nashville	
Win	17-4	Demetrius Liddell	KO		06/26/1999	Gallatin	
Win	16-4	Marvin Hill	TKO		03/25/1999	Boot Scoot'n Saloon, Cuyahoga Falls	
Win	15-4	Mike DeVito	TKO		01/14/1999	Jim Porter's, Louisville	
Win	14-4	Wesley Smith	UD		11/27/1998	St. Joseph Hall, Akron	
Loss	13-4	Brian Nielsen	TKO		09/04/1998	Kolding Hallen, Kolding	
Win	13-3	James Holley	TKO		12/16/1997	Music City Mix Factory, Nashville	
Win	12-3	Paul Dawson	TKO		12/02/1997	Music City Mix Factory, Nashville	
Win	11-3	George Harris	TKO		10/07/1997	Nashville	
Win	10-3	Moses Harris	KO		05/07/1996	Steubenville	
Win	9-3	George Harris	TKO		04/27/1996	Mountaineer Casino Racetrack and Resort, Chester	
Loss	8-3	Patrick Freeman	TKO		08/03/1995	Silver Nugget, North Las Vegas	
Win	8-2	Kevin Poindexter	TKO		07/27/1995		
Win	7-2	James Holley	KO		06/29/1995	Louisville	
Win	6-2	Moses Harris	TKO		06/08/1995	Silver Nugget, North Las Vegas	
Win	5-2	Robert Curry	KO		06/01/1995	Louisville	
Win	4-2	Ed Strickland	TKO		04/10/1993	Toledo	
Loss	3-2	Jim Davis	PTS		03/28/1993	Metro Plex Center, Youngstown	
Win	3-1	Mike Jones	TKO		02/26/1993	UAW Hall, Parma	
Win	2-1	J R Nichols	TKO		01/15/1993	Seagate Convention Center, Toledo	
Win	1–1	David Platt	TKO		08/19/1992	Toledo	
Loss	0–1	Mike Owens	UD		05/01/1992	AJ Palumbo Center, Pittsburgh	

== Accomplishments ==
- 1st team All Mid-American conference
- Nicholson Award winner (Toledo MVP)
- Nominee for the Vern Smith award (MAC MVP)
