= Knockout Kings 2001 =

EA Sports video game

- North American PlayStation 2 box art featuring Oscar De La Hoya (left) and Shane Mosley (right)
- Developer: Black Ops Entertainment
- Publisher: EA Sports
- Series: Knockout Kings
- Platforms: PlayStation, PlayStation 2
- Release: PlayStation: NA: October 31, 2000; EU: November 23, 2000; PlayStation 2: NA: February 7, 2001; EU: March 9, 2001
- Genre: Boxing
- Modes: Single-player, multiplayer

Knockout Kings 2001 (known as Box Champions 2001 in Germany for the PS1) is a boxing video game developed by EA Sports. The third installment in the Knockout Kings series, the game was released for PlayStation in 2000, and later for PlayStation 2 in 2001. Oscar De La Hoya and Shane Mosley appear on the North American cover, while the European cover features Lennox Lewis.

== Gameplay ==
Knockout Kings 2001 features a roster of 40 boxers, increased from the 25 featured in Knockout Kings 2000. Alongside retired boxers like Muhammad Ali and Sugar Ray Leonard, the game also featured contemporary boxers like Lennox Lewis and Shane Mosley. It is the only game in the series to feature female boxers, which included Mia St. John, Christy Martin, Lucia Rijker, and Regina Halmich. Commentary during in-game matches was provided by Al Bernstein, Max Kellerman and Teddy Atlas, while Mills Lane and Richard Steele were featured as the referees. Jimmy Lennon Jr. was featured as the ring announcer. In the European version, the commentary was instead provided by Harry Carpenter, Barry McGuigan and Ian Darke.

The ability for the player to create their own character was retained from the previous game. Alongside standard moves such as jabs, uppercuts, and roundhouse punches, the player can also perform "dirty" moves against opponents including low punches, elbows and head butts.

== Reception ==
Reception

Aggregate score
Aggregator	Score	
Aggregator	PS	PS2
Metacritic	84/100	81/100

Review scores
Publication	Score	
Publication	PS	PS2
CNET Gamecenter	7/10	N/A
Electronic Gaming Monthly	7/10 (Note: Three critics of Electronic Gaming Monthly gave the PlayStation version each a score of 7.5/10, 6.5/10, and 7/10.)	7.33/10 (Note: In Electronic Gaming Monthly's review of the PlayStation 2 version, one critic gave it 8/10, and the rest gave it each a score of 7/10.)
EP Daily	8.5/10	8/10
Famitsu	N/A	30/40
Game Informer	7.5/10	9/10
GameSpot	8.9/10	4.8/10
GameSpy	N/A	85%
IGN	8.2/10	8.6/10
Next Generation	3/5	4/5
Official U.S. PlayStation Magazine	4/5	4/5
X-Play	N/A	4/5
BBC Sport	73%	N/A

The game received "favorable" reviews according to the review aggregation website Metacritic. John Gaudiosi of NextGen's January 2001 issue said that while the PlayStation version was "a good boxing game, it's still not as good as it could be. Also, if you played KK2000, you won't find much of a difference." Three issues later, Rob Smolka said of the PS2 version, "Honoring the strategy of boxing as much as the ferocity, this should enthrall fans of the sport." In Japan, where the latter console version was ported and published by Electronic Arts Victor on May 24, 2001, Famitsu gave it a score of 30 out of 40.

Air Hendrix of GamePro's December 2000 issue said of the PlayStation version, "The Knockout Kings series has lived up to its name as the PlayStation's boxing champ for a couple of years now, and this 2001 edition only continues that reign. With sharp new features, graphics, and controls, Knockout Kings 2001 owns the PlayStation boxing ring." (Note: GamePro gave the PlayStation version 4.5/5 for graphics, 3.5/5 for sound, and two 5/5 scores for control and fun factor.) Four issues later, he said, "If you're a boxing fan with a PS2, Knockout Kings won't move mountains for you, but it's still the PS2's best boxing game and [it] will provide plenty of thrills. If you've already conquered the PlayStation version, however, steer clear – this game is too similar to be worth its ticket price." (Note: GamePro gave the PlayStation 2 version 3.5/5 for graphics, 3/5 for sound, 4.5/5 for control, and 4/5 for fun factor.)

== Lawsuit ==
In March 2004, Alexis Argüello filed a lawsuit against Electronic Arts, Nintendo, and Sony regarding his appearance in both Knockout Kings 2000 and Knockout Kings 2001. He alleged that his likeness and identity were put into the games without his permission.
