= Treasures of the Deep =

1997 video game

- North American cover art
- Developer: Black Ops Entertainment
- Publishers: NA: Namco Hometek; EU: Sony Computer Entertainment
- Director: Jose Villeta
- Producer: John Bowegti
- Designer: Jose Villeta
- Programmers: Jose Villeta; Matthew Whiting; Derrick Yim; Rudi Kammerer
- Artists: Shannon Studstill; Alexander Stein; Jon Bailey; Dave Goodrich
- Composer: Tommy Tallarico Studios
- Platform: PlayStation
- Release: NA: September 24, 1997; EU: July 1998
- Genre: Action-adventure
- Mode: Single-player

Treasures of the Deep is an action-adventure video game developed by Black Ops Entertainment and published by Namco Hometek for the PlayStation. The player controls an underwater explorer who scours deep sea environments around the world for treasure in scuba gear and submersibles while undertaking various missions and fending off hostile pirates and sea life. The soundtrack was provided by video game composer Tommy Tallarico.

== Gameplay ==
The gameplay in Treasures of the Deep focuses on underwater exploration in a variety of wetsuits and gradually more powerful one-man submersibles, in order to fulfill objectives such as capping underwater oil leaks, exploring shipwrecks, recovering plane crash victims and destroying hostile installations. Finding treasure is a secondary objective. Ancient gems from a sunken ship can be put towards upgrading weapons, equipment, and subs. Various wildlife populate the levels, including sharks that attack the player and bleeding divers and animals. The player is fined for killing harmless and endangered species.

The game takes place in 14 diverse underwater locations, ranging from the Bermuda Triangle to Antarctica. The levels are designed to evoke a claustrophobic and moody environment. There is an unlockable 'bonus' level, Atlantis. When the player earns a high score, another bonus level is temporarily unlocked, 'Shark Attack', where the player controls a shark and aims to eat as many sea creatures and divers as possible before the time runs out.

== Plot ==
The game manual identifies the player character as Jack Runyan, a retired Navy SEAL and Gulf War veteran, now under hire of the Undersea Mercenary Agency (UMA), operating in an undersea base near the island of Vieques. The early missions comprise raids on sunken Spanish galleon Concepcion in Puerto Rico trench, Nazi gold lost among Ionian Sea, Aztec treasures in underwater tombs near Yucatan Peninsula, and Hormuz Strait break raid.

The game's antagonist is Simon Black, the head of Seismic Corp, an organization that has been conducting illicit activities. In response to UMA's involvement, Black commits a wave of terrorism across the world's oceans, such as bombarding coral reefs with radiation, provoking seismic activity, and downing the Space Shuttle Atlantis to prevent the deployment of a spy satellite.

At the climax of the game, Black's secret headquarters are discovered within ice caverns in Antarctica, where the player faces off and destroys Black along with his personal underwater combat vehicle.

== Development ==
The programmers used 16 levels of distance fog to clarify the approach of objects and creatures.

== Reception ==
Reception

Review scores
Publication	Score
Electronic Gaming Monthly	8.5/10
GameSpot	5.5/10
IGN	8/10
Next Generation	4/5

Treasures of the Deep received overwhelmingly positive reviews. Critics especially lauded the game's balance of exploration and action and its compelling undersea ambiance. Next Generation remarked that where previous undersea games amounted to little more than "space shooters with a deeper blue hue ... Black Ops actually recognized the tremendous potential for adventures in undersea environments, and with refreshing creativity, brings us the most compelling shooter in quite some time." Kraig Kujawa of Electronic Gaming Monthly made it his pick for "Sleeper Hit of the Holidays" and called it "an undersea action game that adeptly combines action, exploration and resource management into one, very cool package" while Glenn Rubenstein commented in GameSpot, "Like the movie The Abyss, Treasures sets you in a sprawling area where you never know what will happen next - you could come upon a school of fish, get attacked from behind, then worry that your blood could attract sharks."

Critics further credited the convincing animation, sound effects, and wildlife with helping to realize the game's strong aquatic atmosphere. GamePro summed up that "Sharp graphics and animation effectively create a free-roaming 3D ocean environment that's almost more fun to explore than carrying out your mission objectives." The variety of missions was also praised.
