= Knockout Kings 2000 =

1999 fighting video game

- North American cover art featuring Muhammad Ali
- Developers: Black Ops Entertainment; Digital Eclipse (GBC)
- Publisher: EA Sports
- Series: Knockout Kings
- Platforms: Nintendo 64, PlayStation, Game Boy Color
- Release: Nintendo 64: EU: October 10, 1999; NA: October 12, 1999; PlayStation: NA: November 2, 1999; EU: 1999; Game Boy Color: NA: December 21, 1999; EU: 1999
- Genres: Sports, fighting
- Modes: Single-player, multiplayer

Knockout Kings 2000 (known as Box Champions 2000 in Germany) is a video game developed by Black Ops Entertainment and published by EA Sports for Nintendo 64, PlayStation, and Game Boy Color (the latter as simply Knockout Kings) in 1999.

== Gameplay ==
Knockout Kings 2000 features 25 boxers, including Muhammad Ali and Sugar Ray Leonard, and includes the ability to design custom fighters.

A pound for pound boxing arcade style where players can play any of these three modes: Championship, Slugfest, and Training. The "Super Punch" is used where players can instantly knock down his opponent to the floor.

== Music ==
The single "In the Game" by Los Angeles rapper O was specifically created for Knockout Kings 2000. It was promoted jointly by EA sports and Hollywood Records (which also helped promote the game). People who bought the single received coupon discounts for the game. The single sold 25,000 copies.

== Reception ==
Reception

Aggregate score
Aggregator	Score		
Aggregator	GBC	N64	PS
GameRankings	40%	65%	79%

Review scores
Publication	Score		
Publication	GBC	N64	PS
AllGame	2.5/5	3/5	3.5/5
CNET Gamecenter	N/A	5/10	9/10
Electronic Gaming Monthly	N/A	6.5/10	6.75/10 (Note: In Electronic Gaming Monthly's review of the PlayStation version, three critics gave it each a score of 7/10, and the other gave it 6/10.)
Game Informer	N/A	8.25/10	8/10
GameFan	N/A	42%	N/A
GameRevolution	N/A	N/A	B−
GameSpot	N/A	4.5/10	7/10
Hyper	N/A	57%	N/A
IGN	5/10	6.7/10	8.5/10
N64 Magazine	N/A	82%	N/A
Next Generation	N/A	N/A	3/5
Nintendo Power	N/A	8/10	N/A
Official U.S. PlayStation Magazine	N/A	N/A	4/5

The PlayStation version received favorable reviews, and the Nintendo 64 version received mixed reviews, while the Game Boy Color version received unfavorable reviews, according to the review aggregation website GameRankings. Adam Pavlacka of NextGen said that the former console version's "biggest strength lies in its realism. The lack of arcade play is going to turn off a lot of potential fans."

In one review, Air Hendrix of GamePro called the Nintendo 64 version "a true title contender that every N64 gamer should check out." (Note: GamePro gave the Nintendo 64 version two 4.5/5 scores for graphics and sound, and two 5/5 scores for control and fun factor in one review.) In another, however, he changed his tune and said of the same console version, "There's a lot of flash and name recognition going on here, but this fighter doesn't have the iron will necessary to be a true champion." (Note: GamePro gave the Nintendo 64 version two 4/5 scores for graphics and fun factor, 3.5/5 for sound, and 2.5/5 for control in another review.) He later said of the PlayStation version in one review, "If you're looking for a PlayStation boxing match, there's no better bout in town – with its improved in-depth features and controls, it even beats out its N64 counterpart and the Dreamcast's glamorous Ready 2 Rumble. It's no contest; KO Kings rules the console boxing ring." (Note: GamePro gave the PlayStation version two 5/5 scores for graphics and fun factor, 4/5 for sound, and 4.5/5 for control in one review.) The Burn Out said in another review that the PlayStation version "achieves its goal of creating a realistic boxing experience that's better than the original. Die-hard boxing fans are sure to dig the massive list of moves and combos. If you liked the first Knockout Kings, you'll definitely enjoy this one as well. But if you're looking for a game like Ready 2 Rumble, then you're stepping into the wrong ring." (Note: GamePro gave the PlayStation version two 4/5 scores for graphics and sound, and two 4.5/5 scores for control and fun factor in another review.)

The PlayStation version was a runner-up for "9th Annual GamePro Readers' Choice Awards" for "Best Boxing Game", which went to Ready 2 Rumble Boxing for Dreamcast. Said console version did, however, win the award for "Console Sports Game of the Year" at the Academy of Interactive Arts & Sciences' 3rd Annual Interactive Achievement Awards.
