= Knockout Kings =

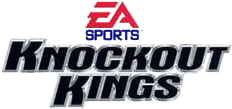
- Genre: Sports (boxing)
- Publisher: EA Sports
- Platforms: PlayStation, PlayStation 2, Xbox, GameCube, Game Boy Color, Nintendo 64
- First release: Knockout Kings 99; 1998
- Latest release: Knockout Kings 2003; 2002

Knockout Kings is a series of boxing video games produced by EA Sports for various platforms yearly between 1998 and 2003, and was replaced by the Fight Night series in 2004.

Before releasing the first Knockout Kings, Electronic Arts released its first 3D boxing game, Foes of Ali, for the 3DO Interactive Multiplayer in 1995. While there are a few similarities between the two games, Foes of Ali was developed by a different team, Gray Matter, and as such, is not regarded as a precursor.

Title	Year	Platforms
Knockout Kings 99	1998	PlayStation
Knockout Kings 2000	1999	PlayStation, Nintendo 64, Game Boy Color
Knockout Kings 2001	2000	PlayStation, PlayStation 2
Knockout Kings 2002	2001	PlayStation 2, Xbox
Knockout Kings 2003	2002	GameCube

== Gameplay ==
The duration of a round can be adjusted to either 90 seconds or 3 minutes. In the game's "slugfest" mode, fighters can knock each other out at any given moment of the fight, or suffer 6 or 7 knockdowns and still last for the whole fight. There are several differences between Knockout Kings, Knockout Kings 2000, and Knockout Kings 2001 in particular, the most notable being the graphics.

In Knockout Kings, the boxer sprites, although distinctive, are not facially representative of their real-life counterparts. Championship bouts can last only up to 10 rounds and not for 12 as in real life or 15 as in the past. In between rounds, all that is seen is a ring-card girl. In Career Mode, user created fighters fight all the way up the ladder, defeating the top contenders and eventually defeating the champion. After beating the title holder, the new champion defends the championship multiple times until retirement. A created boxer can fight in Career Mode and Slugfest Mode, but not in Exhibition mode. Although there is a training mode within Career Mode, it is extremely basic. However, 2 aspects that Knockout Kings has which the sequels lack is that the referee does a mandatory eight-count when a fighter is knocked down whereas in the sequels the referee stops the count immediately after a fighter gets up from a knockdown, and, in Career Mode, the result of a fight is afterwards seen on the screen as front-page newspaper headlines.

The Knockout Kings game series gives users a chance to compete against numerous real fighters, such as Muhammad Ali, Eric Esch, Marvin Hagler, Sugar Ray Leonard, Oscar De La Hoya, Larry Holmes, Jake LaMotta, Roberto Durán, Alexis Argüello, and Ray Mancini. Fake amateur boxing legends, such as Daryl ‘Hotcakes’ McGee, The Great Smokey Maggard, Boto Bondingo, and Flute Top Terry, could also be unlocked by gaining certain achievements.

== Knockout Kings 2000 ==
In Knockout Kings 2000 for the PS, the boxer sprites are for the first time facially representative of their real-life counterparts. Championship bouts can last up to 15 rounds. Sound and Music volume can also be adjusted in Option Mode. In between rounds, users may see either a ring-card girl, a replay of a part of the previous round, or the boxer the user is representing sitting at his corner together with the statistics so far of the bout. Injury to the face of boxers can also be recognized, as well as his mouth-piece flying out if he is hit by a hard punch. A created boxer in Career Mode can now fight in all modes. The training mode within Career Mode is more specific. Users can now control their boxer while he is training and, in the PS version, users can also choose the location of a gym. Each boxer in the PS version can also be seen entering into the ring just before the bout takes place. There is also a new Mode where the player can see the statistics and biography of all the real-life boxers in the game, and another mode in which the player can re-live famous classic bouts. The user-interface and intro-theme of the PS version is different from the N64 version and there are also more boxers, while the graphics on each version are similar.

== Knockout Kings 2001 ==
Knockout Kings 2001 features many well known boxers such as Muhammad Ali, Joe Frazier, Rocky Marciano, Michael Grant, Lennox Lewis, Joe Louis, and Jack Dempsey. It also features arenas such as Caesars Palace, Madison Square Garden, Wembley Arena, and the Roman Coliseum, among others.

Knockout Kings 2001 is largely considered the best boxing game on the original PlayStation. In Japan, Famitsu gave the PS2 version a score of 30 out of 40.

Knockout Kings 2001 contains the same improvements as Knockout Kings 2000 and adds more. Whereas fighters in KO Kings and KO Kings 2000 are either "boxer" or "slugger" style fighters, the styles of fighters in KO Kings 2001 are either "boxer", "slugger", "freestyle", or "crab", and these differences of style are very noticeable during bouts. Commentary in KO Kings 2001 is also far more vocal than its predecessors. During Career Mode, a boxing trainer will occasionally talk and give users advice in between rounds as the bout progresses. A fighter in Career Mode is made to retire after winning the title and defending it for several times. KO Kings 2001 is also the first game of the series to introduce CPU vs CPU bouts and "fantasy match-ups" between famous boxers of different eras, and the first to introduce women's boxing, which is accessible in Exhibition Mode. The PS and PS2 versions of Knockout Kings 2001 are virtually identical.

== Knockout Kings 2002 ==
Knockout Kings 2002 changes many concepts of its predecessors, e.g. users have to progress through a number of bouts in order to unlock new fighters.

== Knockout Kings 2003 ==
The final game of Knockout Kings, is Knockout Kings 2003 developed by GameFlow Entertainment and EA Redwood Studios. It was released exclusively on GameCube in 2002.

After Knockout Kings 2003, the name of the series was replaced by Fight Night.

== See also ==
- Fight Night (video game series)
