= Fight Night (film) =

- Domestic Artwork
- Directed by: Jonathan M. Dillon
- Written by: Ian Shorr
- Produced by: Jonathan M. Dillon; Nick Kimutis; Bobby McGee
- Starring: Rebecca Neuenswander; Chad Ortis
- Cinematography: Hanuman Brown-Eagle
- Edited by: Jonathan Dillon
- Music by: Ryan Adison Amen; Patrick Kirst
- Distributed by: Peace Arch (United States); Cinemavault Releasing (International)
- Release date: September 10, 2008 (SoCal)
- Running time: 104 minutes
- Country: United States
- Language: English

Fight Night (also known as Rigged) is a feature-length action/adventure film directed by Jonathan M. Dillon. It was produced in the United States in 2008. It was shot mostly in the state of Kansas. It was released in the US in 2009.

== Plot ==
Michael Dublin (Chad Ortis) is a shyster specialised in illegal betting. One night during an illegal car race he gets beaten up by a participant whose car he's previously sabotaged. When his opponents are about to stash him away, a feisty female neighbor steps in. Katherine Parker (Rebecca Neuenswander) saves him and Dublin is impressed by how artfully she decks her much heavier, more muscular opponent. The next morning, Dublin finds Parker and asks her to hire him as promoter. She refuses him at first, but after she ends up in prison for attending an illegal boxing event and Dublin manages to get her out, he persuades her to go on a tour with him. Picking up fights all over the country, Parker gains notoriety as a skilled fighter, and aims to participate as a challenger in a notorious annual underground boxing event in Miami.

== Selected cast ==
- Rebecca Neuenswander as Katherine Parker
- Chad Ortis as Michael Dublin
- Kurt Hanover as Clark Richter
- John Wilson as Cleveland

== Critical reception ==
The film received mixed reviews. It has been characterised as a "fast-talking, hard-hitting romp" Robert Koehler of Variety called it similarly "a lean and mean saga" but objected to the intentional crowdpleasing happy end. Christopher Armstead from Film Critics United criticised a certain lack of reality in regards to Katherine Parker shown as being able to knock out much heavier men, yet he admitted watching Neuenswander's performance he eventually "did buy into the fantasy of it all".

== Awards ==
- Dances with Films (Los Angeles, CA): Grand Jury Prize (best film in festival)
- RADAR Film Festival (Hamburg, Germany): won Best Feature Film
- Action on Film International Film Festival (California, USA): won Best Cinematography; nominated for Best Feature, Best Action Sequence on Film
- SoCal Film Festival (California, USA): won Best Female Performance; nominated for Best Direction
