= Agile Warrior F-111X =

1995 video game

- North American PlayStation cover art
- Developer: Black Ops Entertainment
- Publisher: Virgin Interactive Entertainment
- Director: John Botti
- Producer: Robb Alvey
- Designers: Carl Botti; Christian Busic; Grady Hunt
- Programmer: William Botti
- Artists: Alan Lasky; Clay Dale; Shannon Studstill
- Composers: David Fries; Keith Arem; Mical Pedriana
- Platforms: PlayStation, Windows
- Release: PlayStation: NA: 2 November 1995; EU: 2 November 1995; JP: 13 January 1996; Windows: NA: 14 November 1996; EU: 5 July 1997
- Genre: Combat flight simulator
- Modes: Single-player, multiplayer

Agile Warrior F-111X (Note: Also known as Agile Warrior (Japanese: アジャイル・ウオーリア, Hepburn: Ajairu U~ōriā) in Japan.) is a video game developed by Black Ops and published by Virgin Interactive Entertainment for the PlayStation and Windows. It was the first title produced by the studio, initially developing the title from home before they gained their Santa Monica offices.

== Gameplay ==
Agile Warrior is a F-111X flight simulator with several missions.

== Reception ==
Reception

Review scores
Publication	Score
AllGame	2/5 (PS1)
Next Generation	2/5 (PS1)
PC Gamer	68%

Next Generation reviewed the PlayStation version of the game, rating it two stars out of five, and stated that "if you stick with it, there is some fun to be had, but not enough to overcome the game's many small and large frustrations".
