= Knockout Kings (video game) =

1998 fighting video game

- PlayStation cover art featuring Oscar De La Hoya
- Developer: Press Start
- Publisher: EA Sports
- Series: Knockout Kings
- Platform: PlayStation
- Release: NA: November 24, 1998; EU: 1998
- Genres: Sports, fighting
- Modes: Single-player, multiplayer

Knockout Kings (known as Knockout Kings 99 in Europe) is a video game developed by American studio Press Start and published by EA Sports for the PlayStation.

== Gameplay ==
Knockout Kings features 38 professional boxers with motion capture animation. The game also had exclusive rights for boxers Muhammad Ali, Evander Holyfield, Sugar Ray Leonard and Oscar De La Hoya.

== Reception ==
Reception

Aggregate score
Aggregator	Score
GameRankings	69%

Review scores
Publication	Score
Electronic Gaming Monthly	8/10, 7/10, 5/10, 8.5/10
EP Daily	5.5/10
Game Informer	6/10
GameRevolution	B−
GameSpot	7.7/10
IGN	7.3/10
Mega Fun	76%
Next Generation	2/5
Official U.S. PlayStation Magazine	3.5/5
PlayStation: The Official Magazine	2/5
The Cincinnati Enquirer	2.5/4

The game received average reviews according to the review aggregation website GameRankings. Next Generation said, "Ultimately, the game tries very hard to capture the authenticity of the sport, and it is noteworthy that it is the first to present multiple weight classes. It seems fitting the only boxer EA didn't license for Knockout Kings (other than [Mike] Tyson) was Marlon Brando's character from the film On the Waterfront. Like Brando's character, this game 'could've been a contender.'" GamePro, however, said, "An exciting, fun, and competitive game, Knockout Kings will have you out of your seat cheering and talking smack – even during one-player bouts. Buying the game's not only cheaper than most boxing pay-per-views, but a lot more entertaining." (Note: GamePro gave the game two 5/5 scores for graphics and fun factor, 4/5 for sound, and 4.5/5 for control.) In its first full month of release, Knockout Kings was the fifteenth best-selling home console video game in the United States.
