= Foes of Ali =

1995 boxing video game

- Developer: Gray Matter
- Publisher: EA Sports
- Producer: David Bright
- Platform: 3DO
- Release: NA: Q4 1995; EU: Q4 1995
- Genre: Sports game
- Modes: Single player, multiplayer

Foes of Ali is a boxing video game that was developed by Gray Matter and published by EA Sports. It was released near the end of 1995 exclusively for the 3DO system. It was one of the first boxing games to render matches using 3D graphics. Thus, boxers in the game could be shown to move 360 degrees around the ring in a more convincing fashion than had previously been possible using 2D sprites. The gameplay bears many similarities to that featured in 4D Sports Boxing.

== Overview ==
The game features Muhammad Ali, as well as nine of his real life opponents: George Chuvalo, Henry Cooper, Jimmy Ellis, Bob Foster, Joe Frazier, Sonny Liston, Ken Norton, Leon Spinks, Chuck Wepner. The most notable of Ali's opponents not to be included are Larry Holmes, Antonio Inoki and George Foreman.

There are three game modes: 'exhibition', 'tournament', and 'career'. In 'exhibition' mode, the player can select any boxer and fight against anyone in the game. It is possible to assign control of either boxer to the player or the 3DO. In 'tournament' mode, one or two players fight their way through a tournament of boxers. In 'career' mode, the player plays as Ali, and fights each of the other boxers in the same order that Ali did during his career. For the early fights in this mode, Ali is known by his original name, which he used during these fights in real life (Cassius Clay). Before each fight, a photo of the original fight is displayed, and an audio segment voiced by Tim Gammon outlines what happened.

The game was also announced for PlayStation and Sega Saturn, but these were never released.

The game was followed by Knockout Kings in 1998.

== Gameplay ==
A career mode fight against Henry Cooper.

The game simulates a wide variety of boxing punches; jabs, hooks, and uppercuts can be thrown (and faked) with either hand. Defensive techniques consist of blocking, clinching and leaning. Fatigue is not simulated, which means that throwing punches or moving about the ring does not cause a boxer to tire. However, receiving large quantities of punishment does cause a boxer to slow down, both in terms of movement and punching speed.

Though throwing large volumes of punches does not affect a boxer's punching or movement in any way, it does negatively affect his ability to withstand punches. A fighter is significantly easier to knock out if they have already thrown large numbers of punches.

Although there is the option to turn off TKO based stoppages, it has no effect. If a fighter's face is beaten into enough of a bloody mess, fights will be stopped regardless of whether it is selected or not. No matter what the option is set to, the game does not consider other factors when deciding to stop a fight. As a result, it is possible for one boxer to pummel another for 15 rounds with no punches being thrown in response. Subsequently, unlike in real boxing matches, it is not uncommon to have rounds scored 10–6 or lower. By knocking an opponent down around 10 times, it is even possible to win rounds by a 10–0 margin.

The boxers in the game reflect characteristics of the real-life fighters who they are based upon. For example, Henry Cooper, who had a tendency to get cut easily in real life, receives cuts after taking fewer punches than other fighters. Similarly, reflecting the fact that George Chuvalo was renowned for his ability to take punches (he was not once knocked down in his career), it is physically impossible to knock him down in the game (even if the player continuously punches him in the stomach for 15 rounds).

== Presentation ==
The main menu screen.

The animations for the boxers were created using motion capture. Pre-rendered sequences show a ring announcer introducing the start of the fight or announcing the outcome (only the ring announcer is seen/ heard during such scenes). Like most boxing games, a referee is not seen during the matches.

It is possible to injure an opponent's face in a variety of ways that lead to visible damage effects like a bloody nose or black eyes. Decals are used to simulate blood effects on the ring floor and the blood stains will remain throughout the fight. The amount of blood that comes out of fighters' faces can be set to 'none', 'normal', and 'gallons'.

The game allows the player to choose from 21 camera angles, including first person views (similar to that seen in 4D Sports Boxing). When playing the game using the first-person view, damage to the eyes affects the view in appropriate ways. For example, if a boxer's eye takes enough damage for it to become swollen shut, that side of the view will be replaced by blackness. The view will also flash back when the player takes a hard shot, or red when they are hit by a punch that makes their face bleed. Taking substantial numbers of punches to the head will even result in simulated double vision. Other camera views include a bird's-eye view and a free-roaming camera that can be positioned at an angle and distance of the player's choosing.

Depending on the action in the ring, the crowd responds with different speech effects. For example, someone might shout "Good shot!" when a punch is landed, or "Fight, you bum!" if there is little action taking place. There is also some limited commentary by Tim Gammon.

== Reception ==
Reception

Review scores
Publication	Score
Edge	4/10
Electronic Gaming Monthly	6.25/10
Maximum	3/5

Foes of Ali received mostly mediocre reviews. GamePro called it "one of the lamest boxing games", citing poor control and "lifeless" polygon graphics. The two sports reviewers of Electronic Gaming Monthly praised the multiple camera angles and blurred vision, but felt the game fails to hold the player's interest due to its dull gameplay. They gave it scores of 6.0 and 6.5 out of 10. Maximum similarly found that the game's highly detailed texture-mapped polygon graphics are impressive given the limitations of the 3DO, but the fights often boil down to a tedious exchanging of blows. They concluded "This is a well-crafted and solid 3DO release that should suit boxing simulators' needs adequately, but didn't have the necessary excitement to hold our interest in an increasingly expansive sea of next generation software." Edge (UK) awarded the game 4 out of 10, saying: "Bung this motley collection of elements together - slow fighters, a finicky punch and block system, clumsy graphics - and you have one shabby game".

In a 2006 article, GameSpot described Foes of Ali as the most accurate representation of boxing for its time.
