= Fight Night Round 4 =

2009 video game

- Cover art featuring Muhammad Ali and Mike Tyson respectively
- Developer: EA Canada
- Publisher: EA Sports
- Platforms: PlayStation 3 Xbox 360; Windows Mobile; BlackBerry
- Release: NA: June 23, 2009; EU: June 26, 2009; AU: July 2, 2009; JP: January 28, 2010; Windows Mobile: NA: September 22, 2009; BlackBerry: NA: October 23, 2009
- Genre: Sports
- Modes: Single-player, multiplayer

Fight Night Round 4 is a boxing video game developed by EA Sports. It is the sequel to Fight Night Round 3, released in 2006. It was released in 2009 for the PlayStation 3, Xbox 360, Windows Mobile and BlackBerry. The game's featured boxers are Muhammad Ali and Mike Tyson. It contains 48 licensed boxers as well as several new modes, such as Legacy mode.

== Marketing ==
=== Demo ===
On May 14, 2009, a demo of the game was made available to those that had pre-ordered the game from GameStop, although it was made available for everyone to download later that month via Xbox Live or PlayStation Network. The demo features a three-round exhibition match between Ricky Hatton and Manny Pacquiao in the wake of their fight on May 2, 2009. A tutorial mode is also accessible at the beginning of the demo, which is featured in the final release.

On August 27, 2009, a new updated demo was released. It now features a ten-round exhibition match between Muhammad Ali and Mike Tyson, in addition to the previous Hatton vs. Pacquiao match. It also features the return of the classic control scheme for the game where players can use the controller buttons for most controls instead of the right analog stick. This control scheme was originally in all previous Fight Night games, and it was brought into Fight Night Round 4 after fans were complaining about using the new control scheme and sufferings form clusters.

=== Downloadable Content ===
On July 27, 2009, the first piece of downloadable content for Fight Night Round 4 was released. It is free of charge, and includes a new training gym, new gameplay sliders, new equipment and an alternate version of Sugar Ray Leonard.

Additional trunks, gloves and shorts were released along with face button control support in a free update at the end of August.

The next piece of downloadable content, the Boxer Pack, contained Oscar De La Hoya, Vitali Klitschko and Wladimir Klitschko, as well as alternate versions of James Toney and George Foreman was released on 27 August and can be purchased through the PlayStation Store and Xbox Live Marketplace.

In early December, a new pack including Bernard Hopkins, Evander Holyfield, Sonny Liston and two new modes (Old School Rules & Ring Rivalries) was released for the PlayStation 3 and Xbox 360.

=== PlayStation Home ===
On July 16, 2009, EA Sports released a themed game space for Fight Night Round 4 as an expansion to the EA Sports Complex in the European and North American versions of PlayStation Home. The game space is called "Club Fight Night" and features a Club-DJ mini-game with rewards, two video screens and seating for avatars. In an update, there would be a robot boxing mini-game available to play. This space was released in the Japanese version on October 9, 2009. On November 25, 2009, two producers of Fight Night Round 4, Mike Mahar and Brian Hayes, were in the space for a live chat with the Home community.

=== Features ===
Physics based controls, Career mode is redesigned and replaced with legacy mode, players Can use photo game face to more easily put the player in the game, boxers can only block high and low, More focus on counter punching, User controlled cutman is removed and replaced with a point system, and Downloadable characters. Fight Night Round 4 Also added Flyweight and Bantamweight weight classes for the first time in a game. New boxers to the franchise allowed recreations of fights such as Ricky Hatton vs. Paulie Malignaggi, Marvin Hagler vs. Thomas Hearns and Fernando Montiel vs. Nonito Donaire.

The game features 12 arenas, including Boardwalk Hall and the MGM Grand.

== Reception ==
Reception

Aggregate score
Aggregator	Score	
Aggregator	PS3	Xbox 360
Metacritic	88/100	87/100

Review scores
Publication	Score	
Publication	PS3	Xbox 360
1Up.com	91%	N/A
Destructoid	(Sarkar) 8.5/10 (Burch) 8/10	7/10
Edge	N/A	8/10
Eurogamer	N/A	8/10
Game Informer	9/10	9/10
GamePro	4.5/5	4.5/5
GameRevolution	A−	A−
GameSpot	8/10	8/10
GameSpy	4.5/5	4.5/5
GameTrailers	8.9/10	8.9/10
GameZone	8.9/10	9/10
Giant Bomb	4/5	4/5
IGN	8.8/10	8.8/10
PlayStation Official Magazine – Australia	90%	N/A
PlayStation Official Magazine – UK	80%	N/A
Official Xbox Magazine (US)	N/A	9/10
Play	84%	N/A
PlayStation: The Official Magazine	5/5	N/A
PSM3	80%	N/A
VideoGamer.com	90%	N/A
411Mania	9/10	9/10
The Daily Telegraph	9/10	9/10

Fight Night Round 4 received "favorable" reviews on both platforms according to video game review aggregator Metacritic. In Japan, Famitsu gave it a score of three sevens and one five for a total of 26 out of 40.

GameSpot's Justin Calvert praised the game's fast action and its online play. 1UP.com's David Ellis commented that the physics engine improved the gameplay, and made punches feel more realistic. Game Revolution said "Its incredibly accurate physics system doesn't just set a new bar for boxing games, but for all games across all genres." GameSpy's Will Tuttle noted the game's "stunning visuals", and praised the online gameplay. GamePro's Andrew Hayward thought that the gameplay flowed better as a result of the frame rate, which ran at sixty frames per second. IGN's Nate Ahearn felt that the game delivered "the best pure boxing ever seen in a video game." Destructoid said "It doesn't matter if you care about boxing; this superb game is worth a look from everybody; the game itself is a blast to play, and that's what stands out." Eurogamer described it as "An intense, heart-rattling experience that gets more rewarding the more time you invest in learning the nuances. With incredible attention to detail, technical achievements are more than mere eye candy and a deeper, more rewarding fighting system than ever before, it's an essential purchase for boxing fans and fighting game aficionados."

Criticisms were mostly focused towards the single player aspects of the game. IGN's Nate Ahearn commented that the minigames found in the legacy mode were too difficult, a sentiment echoed by GameSpy and GameSpot. Giant Bomb's Jeff Gerstmann criticized the legacy mode for being wrapped in "layers of unnecessary menus". Official Xbox Magazine said "Despite the uphill difficulty curve, repetitive commentary, and long loading times, Round 4 is a force that topples its mind-blowing predecessor in every category." GamesTM said it was "A calculated and intelligent game that favours forethought and tactics over button mashing and impatience."

During the 13th Annual Interactive Achievement Awards, the Academy of Interactive Arts & Sciences nominated Fight Night Round 4 for "Fighting Game of the Year".

The game topped the UK sales charts for several weeks. Total sales exceeded 1 million units.
