= Fight Night Champion =

2011 video game

- Developers: EA Canada; HB Studios (iOS version)
- Publisher: EA Sports
- Platforms: iOS, PlayStation 3, Xbox 360
- Release: NA: March 1, 2011; AU: March 3, 2011; EU: March 4, 2011
- Genre: Sports
- Modes: Single player, Multiplayer (offline, online)

Fight Night Champion is a boxing video game developed by EA Canada and published by Electronic Arts. It is the fifth and last entry in the Fight Night series and was released in March 2011 for the PlayStation 3 and Xbox 360. The game takes a drastic turn from its predecessors, depicting a "grittier", "darker" setting with animations and player damage that "truly conveys the brutality of the sport of boxing." The violence and strong language in the game's story mode earned it a Mature rating from the Entertainment Software Rating Board, the first EA Sports title to do so. It was also one of the first games EA released without a paper manual, instead opting to have an on-disc manual.

The game was officially revealed on July 20, 2010 at an EA Sports studio showcase. It was added to Xbox One's catalog of backward compatible titles in May 2018. The game is the first EA Sports game to feature a full Hollywood-inspired story mode, called Champion Mode. The story follows the career of Andre Bishop, a talented boxer, who is forced to overcome great setbacks including a prison sentence and a corrupt fight promoter. Champion Mode is intended to further convey the brutality and hardship of the sport of boxing.

An iOS version of the game, developed by HB Studios, was released alongside the console versions.

The new direction of the gameplay was highly praised by critics, with the game being released to positive reviews.

== Gameplay ==
=== Full-Spectrum Punch Control ===
Fight Night Champion is a third-person fighter that introduces an all-new control scheme to the series: "Full-Spectrum Punch Control". This method allows players to throw onscreen punches by merely flicking their game controller's right control stick (in addition to the previous default option of punching by pressing a button on the controller). This extra option is intended to eliminate the more complicated controller manipulations that were necessary in the "Total Punch Control" system of previous editions of the Fight Night series.

Along with Full-Spectrum Punch Control, several modifications have been made to the secondary controller buttons that are used for uncommon and power punches. The "Haymaker modifier" of past editions has been replaced with a "power modifier". This modifier allows power punches to be thrown by holding a specific button while punching. The blocking and leaning system has also been modified; there are now single buttons dedicated to both blocking and leaning.

=== Presentation ===
There are three major game modes in Fight Night Champion. The first is the 'Fight Now' mode. This allows players to jump straight into the boxer selection menu, with the venue selection following. The second is Legacy Mode, also a long-running series regular. Legacy Mode is essentially the career mode of the game and allows players to take a selected boxer through a full boxing career. The third, and newest to the series, is Champion Mode. Other game modes are also available, such as the training games and online play (through either Xbox Live or PSN).

The general gameplay interface has also been modified, mainly to convey the brutality of the sport with more accuracy. When players are stunned, the camera's angle changes slightly and a faint whistling noise can be heard (although cinematic effects can be turned off). Knockout replays are now much more detailed, with a close-up view of the knockout punch available in many different angles.

A refined physics animation system is in place. This includes flexing muscles, dynamic bruising and scarring, as well as rippling body effects. Another notable improvement is the detailed damage effects. Boxer physical damage is now dynamic; as a boxer takes damage their face may begin bruising and swelling. Excessive damage leads to cuts, and referee stoppages are in place.

=== Boxer creation ===
The game features a flexible boxer creation feature. Boxers can be created and used in-game. Players are able to upload their created boxer to EA Sports World where other players may download and use them. This has been seen as a source for boxers not included in the official roster. Fan favorites such as Floyd Mayweather Jr., Gennady Golovkin, and Sergio Martinez who are absent in the shipped roster are available as user-created content.

=== Online World Championship, gyms, and rivalry fights ===
The game features a full online mode, through either Xbox Live for Xbox 360 users or PlayStation Network for PlayStation 3 users. Players start out online with minimal stats, similar to Legacy Mode. They can then make progress through the ranks by winning fights.

The player may win an Online World Championship in their weight division. The winner of the Online World Championship must defend their title two times per day to remain champion. If these requirements are not fulfilled, the player will be stripped of their title.

Players can create or join gyms in the game. These gyms are essentially a team of players, or friends. Gyms may contain up to 36 members. Players in each gym may pick rivalry fights with other gyms.

Each new copy of the game contains an online pass, although since June 2013, a pass is not required for online multiplayer.

=== Gameplay ===
Although it is not a completely different experience from the rest of the game, Champion Mode bears many exclusive modifications to make the story more compelling. In most of the fights, players are required to fight in a particular manner or create a certain outcome to be victorious. For example, players may have to be smart against a certain opponent who has a particular strategy. One example of this is an opponent who targets the body; the player is required to stay on the outside and avoid body punches. Another scenario puts the player against slim odds, in which Bishop suffers a hand injury and must avoid using certain punches to avoid permanent damage. The fights are generally meant to be won by knockout, although it is possible to win by decision.

Champion Mode plays out in a movie style, taking approximately 5 hours. Cinematic cutscenes control the flow of the story, and the actual gameplay takes place during fights. Occasionally, cutscenes can be seen in between rounds.

=== Plot ===
Andre Bishop is a boxer serving time in a correctional facility. After winning a jailhouse boxing match against another inmate, he is cornered and brutally beaten by other prisoners including his opponent, severely injuring him. The story then flashes back four years to his rise as a professional fighter. Bishop's career begins as a middleweight when he defeats nine-time amateur champion Joel Savon, earning him significant recognition as a contender. After a few successful bouts, Andre and trainer Gus Carisi are approached by D.L. McQueen, a crooked but famed promoter who wants to promote Andre under the management of his daughter Megan. The two refuse, renewing the longtime rivalry between Carisi and McQueen. After continually failing to sway Andre and an attempt to fix a contender fight falls through, McQueen frames him for police assault with the help of two crooked cops, sentencing Bishop to over five years in prison.

After recovering from his injuries, Andre begins to train himself and keep fit while imprisoned. Andre's brother Raymond is rising up the ranks as a heavyweight, but Andre is angered upon discovering that he has signed with McQueen Promotions and cut Gus out. After Andre is released, Raymond organizes him a job as an assistant trainer. After Andre beats two ranked heavyweights during regular sparring sessions, Megan, who has split from her father's business over 'philosophical differences', convinces him to make an unexpected comeback as a heavyweight and becomes his manager, with Gus returning as Andre's trainer. Following several successful heavyweight bouts, Andre becomes a contender to the undefeated world heavyweight champion Isaac Frost, a boxer under McQueen Promotions who has won every fight in his career by knockout.

Jealous of his brother's return and bitter about being overshadowed, Raymond challenges Andre to a title eliminator bout, with the winner securing a fight against Frost. Raymond knocks Andre out in the second round after Andre voluntarily stays down from a knockdown. Raymond then fights Frost, but is defeated by a first-round knockout and hospitalised. Angered, Andre challenges Frost himself. Megan covertly records one of McQueen's crooked cops mentioning the frame job on Andre, forcing McQueen to agree to the bout. Adopting a defensive strategy, Andre knocks Frost out and becomes the world heavyweight champion. McQueen is subsequently arrested when the framing of Andre is revealed.

=== Characters ===
André Bishop – The main protagonist of the game, André begins his professional career as a talented prospect. However, his dreams of following in his father's footsteps and taking a shot at the world title is soon ruined after he is framed by two crooked cops, but makes a comeback, winning the heavyweight belt. He is modeled on and voiced by LaMonica Garrett.

D.L. McQueen – The head of McQueen Promotions and a famous fight promoter, McQueen is known for his hot temper and short-lived partnerships with professional fighters. He has been long despised by Gus Carisi, André's trainer, for his notoriety. He sets André up to be arrested when he refuses to sign with him, but Megan and André expose his corruption at the end of the story. He is played by Randy McCormick and was computer-captured at Maple Ridge, British Columbia, with Walter Addison providing his voice.

Gus Carisi – André's loyal trainer and manager, Gus had previously trained André's father, who was also a talented fighter. He took both André and Raymond in after their parents died and raised them. An experienced trainer, Gus understands the true brutality of boxing and the hard work required to overcome it. He is voiced by Ralph P. Martin.

Raymond Bishop – André's younger brother, Raymond also pursues a professional career in boxing as a heavyweight. Raymond upsets André when he decides to leave Gus and sign with McQueen Promotions. Once André reemerges as a heavyweight fighter, Raymond becomes jealous and challenges him to a fight. After an upset over his brother, he is knocked out by Isaac Frost. He is voiced by Dawan Owens.

Megan McQueen – The daughter of D.L. McQueen, Megan starts off as a manager for her father's company, but leaves due to "philosophical differences". She then becomes a solo manager, even managing André herself. She bears the likeness of actress Pauline Egan and is voiced by Eliza Dushku.

Isaac Frost – A heavyweight fighter who wins the title two years after beginning his professional career. He has defended his title numerous times, including in a match against Raymond Bishop, whom he brutally knocked out. This spurs André to challenge Frost himself. He started off as an amateur boxing gold medalist, and has a pro boxing record of 33–0 before his bout against André Bishop. His character and physique is inspired by Ivan Drago from the Rocky IV film, but his looks are based on WWE wrestler Randy Orton. He is voiced by Travis Willingham.

Franco – A corrupt police officer who helps D.L. McQueen frame André. Sometime during Bishop's imprisonment, he joins with McQueen Promotions. He along with D.L. McQueen are arrested at the end for framing André. He is voiced by Jon Southwell.

Ace – André's trainer, manager, doctor and best friend during his imprisonment. He is last seen watching André’s title bout against Issac Frost in prison, cheering when André wins. He is voiced by Damien Leake.

== Roster ==
Fight Night Champion features over 50 boxers in total through 8 weight divisions (flyweight doesn't have a boxer in its roster unless a boxer has been created), making it the largest roster in the series. New inclusions permit recreations of fights such as Wladimir Klitschko vs. David Haye and Manny Pacquiao vs. Timothy Bradley. There are additional fighters available but downloadable content is not freely available. Some boxers are not licensed for use in the game's bare knuckle mode.

== Venues ==
There are twenty-one venues included in Fight Night Champion, which range from Cowboys Stadium, to large arenas and boxing gyms.

== Reception ==
Reception

Aggregate score
Aggregator	Score		
Aggregator	iOS	PS3	Xbox 360
Metacritic	79/100	84/100	86/100

Review scores
Publication	Score		
Publication	iOS	PS3	Xbox 360
Eurogamer	8/10	N/A	8/10
Famitsu	N/A	29/40	31/40 (X360) 29/40
Game Informer	N/A	9/10	9/10
GamePro	N/A	N/A	4.5/5
GameRevolution	N/A	A	A
GameSpot	N/A	8.5/10	8.5/10
GameTrailers	N/A	N/A	9.3/10
Gamezebo	4/5	N/A	N/A
IGN	8.5/10	8/10	8/10
MacLife	4.5/5	N/A	N/A
Official Xbox Magazine (US)	N/A	N/A	8.5/10
Pocket Gamer	3.5/5	N/A	N/A
PlayStation: The Official Magazine	N/A	8/10	N/A
TouchArcade	4.5/5	N/A	N/A
The Daily Telegraph	N/A	N/A	8/10
Metro	N/A	7/10	N/A

Fight Night Champion received "generally favorable reviews" on all platforms according to the review aggregation website Metacritic. In Japan, where the Xbox 360 version was ported for release on March 3, 2011, followed by the PlayStation 3 version a week later, Famitsu gave it a score of 31 out of 40 for the former console version (and Famitsu X360 gave it three sevens and one eight) and 29 out of 40 for the latter.

The new concept and direction of the series was highly praised. Tom Hoggins of The Daily Telegraph wrote in an early review of the Xbox 360 version, "This is a tough, burly sequel that understands what we want from the blood and sweat of sport it represents", citing its brutality and emotion aspects as a winning factor. Hilary Goldstein of IGN also praised these factors in its early review, and praised Champion Mode for carrying the emotional weight of the PS3 and Xbox versions, stating that it gave them "more sense of emotion out of what is usually a soulless experience".

"It's far from a revolution – much of the framework will be familiar to Fight Night fans – but as the best-looking and most technically accomplished game the series has yet produced, this evolution exceeds our expectations, without totally blowing us away."

— Eurogamer

Eurogamer called the Xbox 360 version the most technically accomplished game in the series, and said that the evolution exceed their expectations "without totally blowing us away". GameZone gave the same console version eight out of ten, saying, "No matter what frustrations the game may hold for you, there's no denying this is one pretty package of violence. Fight Night Champion is surely one of the best-looking and best-playing games of its kind." Edge gave the PlayStation 3 version nine out of ten, saying that the game "has tirelessly rebuilt itself when many expected retirement. Cautious improvements from Round 4 - the removal of the cut-man game and automation of recovery - have been confidently reinforced, while ring physics, ragdolls and cloth dynamics are in a different class to the chaotic Round 3."

Scott Jones of The A.V. Club gave the Xbox 360 version an A−, calling it "the best thing to happen to boxing since 1997." However, Metro gave the PlayStation 3 version seven out of ten in its early review, saying that the game was "Still the best boxing sim around but the justification for this new sequel is pretty thin, despite a number of minor improvements."

During the 15th Annual Interactive Achievement Awards, the Academy of Interactive Arts & Sciences nominated Fight Night Champion for "Fighting Game of the Year".

The game topped the sales charts in the UK.
