= Fight Night Round 3 =

2006 video game

- Xbox 360 and PlayStation Portable cover art featuring Oscar De La Hoya
- Developer: EA Chicago
- Publisher: EA Sports
- Director: Jennifer Gadrinab
- Producer: Keith J. Morton
- Programmer: Zak Phelps
- Artists: Darren Bennett; David Lee Michicich; Joshua Y. Tsui
- Series: Fight Night
- Platforms: PlayStation 2 PlayStation 3 PlayStation Portable; Xbox; Xbox 360; Mobile phone
- Release: NA: February 20, 2006; AU: March 6, 2006; EU: March 10, 2006; Mobile: NA: November 30, 2006; PlayStation 3: NA: December 5, 2006; AU: March 22, 2007; EU: March 23, 2007
- Genre: Sports
- Modes: Single-player, multiplayer

Fight Night Round 3 is a boxing video game developed by Electronic Arts. It is the sequel to EA Sports' previous boxing title, Fight Night Round 2, which was released in 2005. Fight Night Round 3 was released on February 20, 2006, for the Xbox, Xbox 360, PlayStation Portable and PlayStation 2. The mobile phone version was released on November 30, 2006, and the PlayStation 3 version was released five days later.

== Overview ==
Fight Night Round 3 was developed by EA Chicago. It is the third boxing title in the Fight Night franchise. It features the usual improvements such as better graphics and gameplay. "Impact Punches" are one of the most drastic changes, along with ESPN Classic fights and a new career mode, in which the player fights to gain popularity in order to reach sponsored fights, or to be featured on ESPN. Unlike in older versions, Round 3 defaults without a heads-up display (HUD), allowing a player to judge the status of their stamina and energy based on their stance, movements, and facial features, instead of the usual stamina meter. The roster consists of 27 licensed fighters, Fight Night Round 3 allows open weight bouts. This means everyone on the roster can fight one another in exhibitions. The official roster allows recreations of such fights as James Toney vs. Roy Jones Jr.

== Versions ==
The game has been released for several video game consoles and some differences exist between the versions. The cover art features Arturo Gatti and Micky Ward on the sixth-generation versions. The seventh-generation versions have Oscar De La Hoya on the cover. Only the PS3 version can be played in a first-person view. The PS3 version omitted Evander Holyfield from the roster.

== Theme song ==
The theme song for this game is "Never Gonna Get It" by Sean Biggs, featuring Akon and Topic.

== Venues ==
The game features recreations of real-life venues such as the Staples Center and Madison Square Garden.

== Critical reception and awards ==
Reception

Aggregate score
Aggregator	Score				
Aggregator	PS2	PS3	PSP	Xbox	Xbox 360
Metacritic	84/100	83/100	74/100	83/100	86/100

Review scores
Publication	Score				
Publication	PS2	PS3	PSP	Xbox	Xbox 360
Edge	8/10	N/A	8/10	8/10	8/10
Electronic Gaming Monthly	N/A	N/A	N/A	N/A	8.33/10
Eurogamer	N/A	N/A	N/A	N/A	8/10
Famitsu	N/A	N/A	N/A	N/A	30/40
Game Informer	9/10	9/10	7.75/10	9/10	9/10
GamePro	N/A	4.25/5	3.5/5	N/A	4.5/5
GameRevolution	B	B+	C+	B	B+
GameSpot	8.2/10	8.2/10	6.9/10	8.2/10	8.3/10
GameSpy	3.5/5	4/5	2.5/5	4.5/5	4.5/5
GameTrailers	N/A	N/A	N/A	N/A	8.2/10
GameZone	8.2/10	8.4/10	8.2/10	8.1/10	8.8/10
IGN	8/10	8.3/10	6.7/10	8/10	8.5/10
Official U.S. PlayStation Magazine	4/5	8/10	4/5	N/A	N/A
Official Xbox Magazine (US)	N/A	N/A	N/A	9/10	10/10
The A.V. Club	N/A	N/A	N/A	N/A	A
Detroit Free Press	N/A	N/A	N/A	N/A	3/4

The game received "favorable" reviews on all platforms except the PSP version, which received "average" reviews, according to video game review aggregator Metacritic.

G4's Reviews on the Run's Victor Lucas stated that Round 3 had the best graphics he had ever seen on a video game. IGN gave the Mobile version a score of eight out of ten, saying, "What this all adds up is a serious package for fight fans. You have a complex control scheme that gives you access to some devastating small-screen fight action. I think this emphasis on hardcore mechanics reduces Fight Night's reach to a mere sliver of the mobile gaming audience, though. I respect and understand the point of the Fight Night franchise, but I hoped EA Mobile would include some sort of option for the casual-minded. I guess that's what Super KO Boxing is for."

Maxim gave the PS3 version a perfect ten, saying, "What you get here is the same game on the PS3—complete with the boring mini-games, the long load times, and the unbelievably addictive boxing action—with one all-important twist: the PS3 version includes a first-person mode. "Get in the Ring" mode puts you into the jockstrap and bads tats of your self-created boxer. Everything you could do in the game's third-person mode you can now do in first-person." The A.V. Club also gave said version an A and said that, "The only real problem with Round 3 is that any improvements in Round 4 are likely to be strictly cosmetic." The Sydney Morning Herald gave said version a score of four stars out of five and said, "Victories are initially too simple and training dull but professional bouts hugely engaging. Patient defence, careful countering, well-timed combinations and conserving stamina are crucial." Detroit Free Press gave the same console version a score of three stars out of four and said, "Like a fierce haymaker to the jaw, the visuals of Fight Night Round 3 will knock you on your rear end." In Japan, Famitsu gave the same console version a score of two eights and two sevens for a total of 30 out of 40.

The game was criticized for its highly intrusive product placement. While brands for athletic apparel, such as Everlast and Under Armour are expected in a sports game, sponsorship by Dodge and Burger King is regarded as excessive (The Burger King can even be used as a trainer). It won GameSpot's 2006 award for the game with the "Most Despicable Use of In-Game Advertising". The game received the IGN award for Best Offline Multiplayer on PlayStation 3 in 2006. It also received the first ever BAFTA (British Academy of Film & Television Arts) for a sports video game in 2006. It is the only game in the series to be listed in the book 1001 Video Games You Must Play Before You Die. During the 10th Annual Interactive Achievement Awards, the Academy of Interactive Arts & Sciences awarded Fight Night Round 3 with "Fighting Game of the Year", along with receiving a nomination for "Outstanding Achievement in Animation".
