= James Shuler =

American boxer

Personal information
- Nickname: Black Gold
- Nationality: American
- Born: James Shuler; 29 May 1959
- Died: March 17, 1986 (aged 26)
- Height: 6 ft 1 in (1.85 m)
- Weight: Middleweight

Boxing career
- Reach: 78 in (198 cm)
- Stance: Orthodox

Boxing record
- Total fights: 23
- Wins: 22
- Win by KO: 16
- Losses: 1
Medal record
Amateur boxing
Representing the United States
World Cup
| Gold medal – first place | 1979 New York | Light-Middleweight |
Pan American Games
| Silver medal – second place | 1979 San Juan | Light-Middleweight |

James Shuler (May 29, 1959 – March 17, 1986) was a U.S. Olympic and professional boxer from Philadelphia known as "Black Gold."

== Amateur career ==
Shuler was trained by Joe Frazier.

Shuler was the 1979 and 1980 National Golden Gloves Light Middleweight Champion. He qualified at 156 pounds and was a member of the 1980 U.S. Olympic boxing team that perished in an air crash in Warsaw, Poland, on March 14, 1980. Shuler was not with the team, however, as he had stayed in America due to injury. The team was en route to Warsaw, Poland for the USA vs. Poland Box-off as part of "USA vs. the World." event. Among the USA Boxing teammates who were killed in the plane crash were Lemuel Steeples from St. Louis; Kelvin Anderson from Connecticut; Paul Palomino - the brother of Carlos Palomino; George Pimentel, and Olympic Coach, Sarge Johnson. Members of the team who were also not aboard included Bobby Czyz and Alex Ramos RBF.

Shuler did not participate in the 1980 Olympics due to the boycott. In 2007, he posthumously received one of 461 Congressional Gold Medals created especially for the spurned athletes.

=== Highlights ===
(gold) National Golden Gloves (156 lbs), Indianapolis, Indiana, March 1979:

- 1/2: Defeated Alfred Mayes by decision
- Finals: Defeated Randy Smith by decision

Pan Am Trials (156 lbs), Toledo, Ohio, May–June 1979:

- 1/2: Defeated James Rayford by decision
- Finals: Defeated Alfred Mayes by decision

(silver) Pan American Games (156 lbs), San Juan, Puerto Rico, July 1979:

- 1/4: Defeated Luis Felipe Martínez (Cuba) by split decision, 3–2
- 1/2: Defeated Jorge Amparo (Dominican Republic) by decision
- Finals: Lost to José Molina (Puerto Rico) RSC 2

(gold) World Cup (156 lbs), New York City, October 1979:

- 1/4: Defeated Jim Spencer (Australia) by unanimous decision, 5–0
- 1/2: Defeated Khamzat Dzhabrailov (Soviet Union) by unanimous decision, 5–0
- Finals: Defeated Park Il Chun (South Korea) by unanimous decision, 5–0

Frazier–Ali teams match-up (156 lbs) Houston, Texas, February 1980:

- Lost to Jeff Stoudemire by decision

(gold) National Golden Gloves (156 lbs), Hirsch Memorial Coliseum, Shreveport, Louisiana, March 1980:

- 1/8: Defeated Shane Hoose by decision
- 1/4: Defeated Roy Sapp by decision
- 1/2: Defeated Charles Garner RSC 2
- Finals: Defeated Donald Bowers by decision

Olympic Trials (156 lbs), Atlanta, Georgia, June 1980:

- 1/4: Defeated Alfred Mayes by unanimous decision, 5–0
- 1/2: Defeated Donald Bowers by decision
- Finals: Defeated Kenneth Styles RSC 2 (2:26)

USA–USSR Duals (156 lbs), Showboat Hotel, Las Vegas, Nevada, January 1977:

- Lost to Alexander Koshkin (Soviet Union) KO 1 (2:00)

Shuler finished his amateur career with a record of 165–8.

== Professional career ==
Shuler began his professional boxing career as a middleweight on September 12, 1980, with a second-round knockout of Chris Rogers in Philadelphia. During his five years as a pro, he won the NABF, national Middleweight championship with a win over Sugar Ray Seales. He had a 22–1 record with sixteen knockouts. His first and only professional loss came on March 10, 1986, to Thomas Hearns when he was knocked out in the first round.

== Death ==
Shuler died in a motorcycle accident in Philadelphia on 17 March 1986, just one week after his last fight against Thomas Hearns.

== Memory and tribute ==
Bob Arum, the promoter of Shuler's last fight, said that the boxer came to Arum's room a day after the Hearns fight and thanked him for promoting it. Arum, who had promoted many bouts, said that Shuler was the only fighter who had ever done that, adding, "He was a decent, decent young man."

In 1995, his close friend Percy Custus opened the 'James Shuler Memorial Boxing Gym' in Shuler's native Philadelphia in honor of the fallen fighter. Custus met Shuler in the 1970s at the Joe Frazier Gym where they trained together and remained close friends for the rest of James’ life.

== Professional boxing record ==
22 Wins (16 knockouts, 6 decisions), 1 Loss (1 knockout)
| Result | Opp Record | Opponent | Type | Round | Date | Location | Notes |
| Loss | 40-2 | (United States) Thomas Hearns | KO | 1 | 10/03/1986 | (United States) Caesars Palace, Las Vegas, Nevada | WBC NABF Middleweight Title. Shuler knocked out at 1:13 of the first round. |
| Win | 16-13 | (United States) Jerry Holly | UD | 10 | 04/07/1985 | (United States) Resorts Casino Hotel, Atlantic City, New Jersey | 8-2, 9-0, 10-0. |
| Win | 34-0-2 | (United States) James Kinchen | SD | 12 | 16/02/1985 | (United States) The Sands, Atlantic City, New Jersey | WBC NABF Middleweight Title. 115-114, 116-113, 114-115. |
| Win | 15-4 | (Guyana) Kenny Bristol | UD | 10 | 25/02/1984 | (United States) Resorts Casino Hotel, Atlantic City, New Jersey | |
| Win | 23-3 | (United States) Clint Jackson | PTS | 12 | 17/01/1984 | (United States) Pennsylvania Hall, Philadelphia, Pennsylvania | WBC NABF Middleweight Title. |
| Win | 15-5 | (United States) Leroy Green, Jr. | KO | 1 | 25/11/1983 | (Canada) Pacific Coliseum, Vancouver, British Columbia | |
| Win | 12-5-2 | (United States) Wilbur Henderson | KO | 3 | 28/09/1983 | (United States) Scranton, Pennsylvania | |
| Win | 21-4 | (United States) Norberto Sabater | KO | 2 | 17/09/1983 | (United States) The Sands, Atlantic City, New Jersey | |
| Win | -- | (United States) Wilfredo Acosta | KO | 1 | 14/06/1983 | (United States) Philadelphia Civic Center, Philadelphia, Pennsylvania | |
| Win | 30-23-5 | (Dominican Republic) Inocencio De la Rosa | KO | 4 | 18/03/1983 | (United States) Atlantic City Convention Center, Atlantic City, New Jersey | |
| Win | 56-7-3 | (United States) Ray Seales | UD | 12 | 23/10/1982 | (United States) Great Gorge Resort, McAfee, New Jersey | WBC NABF Middleweight Title. 118-111, 119-110, 117-112. |
| Win | 9-9 | (Dominican Republic) Dario De Asa | KO | 2 | 18/09/1982 | (United States) The Sands, Atlantic City, New Jersey | |
| Win | 4-5 | (United States) Collin Keller | KO | 2 | 12/06/1982 | (United States) Playboy Hotel and Casino, Atlantic City, New Jersey | |
| Win | 6-4 | (United States) Ricky Sheppard | KO | 4 | 11/04/1982 | (United States) Playboy Hotel and Casino, Atlantic City, New Jersey | |
| Win | 17-8 | (Dominican Republic) Jesus Castro | KO | 4 | 13/02/1982 | (United States) Playboy Hotel and Casino, Atlantic City, New Jersey | Castro knocked out at 0:42 of the fourth round. |
| Win | 1-6 | (United States) Wyatt Simpkins | KO | 4 | 07/11/1981 | (United States) Playboy Hotel and Casino, Atlantic City, New Jersey | |
| Win | 5-2-2 | (United States) Kenny Hodges | KO | 3 | 18/07/1981 | (United States) Imperial Palace Hotel and Casino, Las Vegas, Nevada | |
| Win | 2-3 | (United States) Willard Nance | KO | 4 | 17/06/1981 | (United States) Martin Luther King Arena, Philadelphia, Pennsylvania | |
| Win | 0-2 | Vincent Evans | TKO | 1 | 11/04/1981 | (United States) Concord Resort Hotel, Kiamesha Lake, New York | Referee stopped the bout at 1:33 of the first round. |
| Win | 0-7 | (United States) Robert Gregory Dean Thomas | TKO | 5 | 28/03/1981 | (United States) Resorts Casino Hotel, Atlantic City, New Jersey | |
| Win | 2-2 | (United States) Charlie Hecker | TKO | 3 | 28/11/1980 | (United States) Felt Forum, New York City | Referee stopped the bout at 1:09 of the third round. |
| Win | 3-1 | (United States) Jamal Arbubakar | UD | 4 | 10/10/1980 | (United States) Felt Forum, New York City | |
| Win | 0-2 | (United States) Chris Rogers | TKO | 2 | 12/09/1980 | (United States) Felt Forum, New York City | |
