= Stoudemire =

Stoudemire is a surname. Notable people with the surname include:

- Amar'e Stoudemire (born 1982), American-Israeli NBA and Israel Basketball Premier League basketball player
- Jeff Stoudemire (born 1957), American professional boxer
- Ralph Stoudemire, American murder victim

== See also ==
- Stoudamire
