= Thomas Hearns vs. Juan Roldán =

Boxing match

- Date: October 29, 1987
- Venue: Las Vegas Hilton, Winchester, Nevada, U.S.
- Title(s) on the line: vacant WBC middleweight title

Tale of the tape
| Boxer | Thomas Hearns | Juan Roldán |
| Nickname | The Hitman | Martillo ("The Hammer") |
| Hometown | Detroit, Michigan, U.S. | Freyre, Córdoba, Argentina |
| Purse | $1,100,000 | $250,000 |
| Pre-fight record | 44–2 (37 KO) | 65–3–2 (45 KO) |
| Age | 29 years | 30 years, 7 months |
| Height | 6 ft 1 in (185 cm) | 5 ft 8 in (173 cm) |
| Weight | 159 1/2 lb (72 kg) | 159 1/4 lb (72 kg) |
| Style | Orthodox | Orthodox |
| Recognition | WBC; No. 1 Ranked Middleweight; WBC; Light Heavyweight Champion; The Ring; No. 3 Ranked Light Heavyweight; 3–division champion | WBC; No. 2 Ranked Middleweight; The Ring; No. 10 Ranked Middleweight |

Result
- Hearns wins via 4th–round knockout

Thomas Hearns vs. Juan Roldán was a professional boxing match contested on October 29, 1987, for the vacant WBC middleweight title.

== Background ==
In his previous fight, then 2–division world champion Thomas Hearns had made the jump to light heavyweight and defeated Dennis Andries to capture his third world title in his third division. Hearns was still a top–ranked middleweight and the World Boxing Council eventually gave him an ultimatum to either defend his WBC light heavyweight title against their number–one contender Eddie Davis or return to the middleweight division to challenge Juan Roldán for the WBC middleweight title which had been declared vacant as a result of Sugar Ray Leonard's retirement following his victory over Marvin Hagler. Hearns ultimately decided to pursue the vacant middleweight title in an effort to become boxing's first ever four–division world champion. Hearns cited that fact as well as putting his past defeats to Leonard and Marvin Hagler behind him as a reason for taking the fight, stating "When I beat Roldan, it will erase all the criticizing I've been getting from people because of the fact that Ray Leonard and Marvin Hagler beat me. It seems like I get a lot of flak for that. People always bring up the two losses, and never what I've done. This fight will put me in the history books and put great thoughts in people's minds."

The undercard featured Charles Williams challenging reigning IBF light heavyweight champion Bobby Czyz and then–undefeated middleweight prospect Michael Nunn against Darnell Knox. A possible fight between Hearns and Czyz for the IBF light heavyweight title that was in Czyz's possession was being touted as a possibility should Czyz and Hearns win their respective fights, however Czyz was upset by Williams, putting the end to any such possibility.

== The fight ==
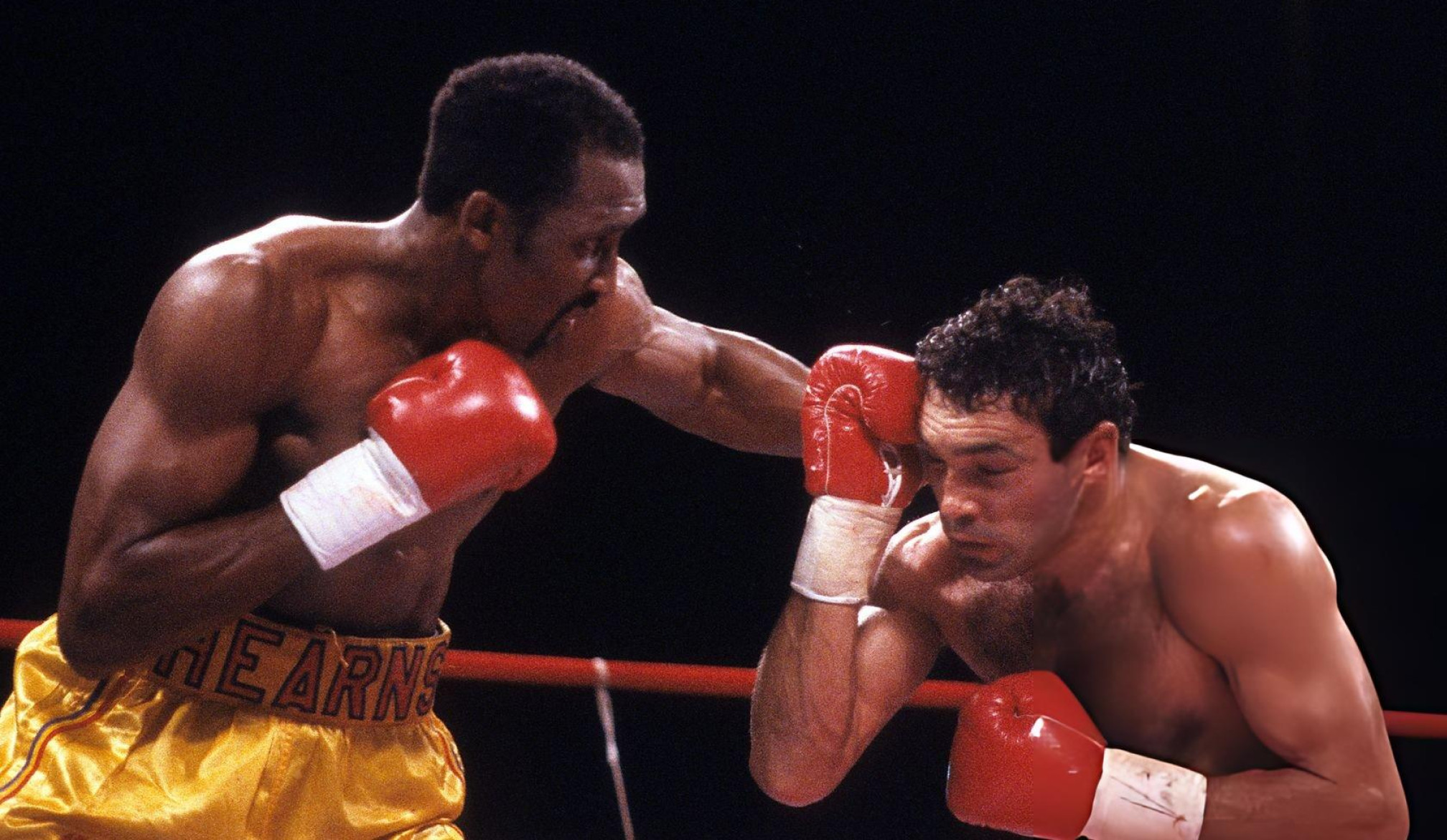

From the opening bell Roldán was aggressive as he charged forward and threw frequent power punches at Hearns, though Hearns was able to weather Roldán's furious start and quickly scored a knockdown one minute into the first round after landing consecutive right hands that dropped Roldán to his knees, though Roldán shrugged off the knockdown and quickly continued his pursuit of Hearns and the two continued to trade punches before Hearns landed a three–punch combination and dropped Roldán again as the first round ended, Roldán got up more slowly than the first knockdown, but he answered the referee's count at six to survive the round. As round two began, Roldán continued his aggressive approach, but Hearns countered a wild Roldán right with a left hook that sent Roldán to the canvas for the third time, though like the previous two times, Roldán once again answered the referee's count. Roldán fought a solid round three, avoiding any knockdowns and taking the round on all three of the judge's scorecards. Then early in round four, Roldán landed a big left hook that stunned Hearns and had him on wobbly legs, though Hearns was able to collect himself and dropped Roldán for the fourth and final time with a right cross to the chin. Roldán fell face first to the canvas and was counted out at 2:01 of the round to give Hearns the knockout victory.

== Aftermath ==
The victory was a historic one that made Hearns the first boxer to win four world titles in four different weight classes.

== Fight card ==
Confirmed bouts:

| Weight Class | Weight | | vs. | | Method | Round | Notes |
|---|---|---|---|---|---|---|---|
| Middleweight | 160 lbs. | Thomas Hearns | def. | Juan Roldán | KO | 4/12 | ^{Note 1} |
| Light Heavyweight | 175 lbs. | Charles Williams | def. | Bobby Czyz (c) | RTD | 9/15 | ^{Note 2} |
| Middleweight | 160 lbs. | Michael Nunn | def. | Darnell Knox | RTD | 4/12 | ^{Note 3} |
| Welterweight | 147 lbs. | Henry Anaya Jr. | def. | Jose Camacho | KO | 4/6 |

^Note 1 For WBC Middlweight title
^Note 2 For IBF Light Heavyweight title
^Note 3 For NABF Middleweight title

== Broadcasting ==
| Country | Broadcaster |
|---|---|
| United Kingdom | ITV |
| United States | Showtime |

| Preceded by vs. Dennis Andries | Thomas Hearns's bouts 29 October 1987 | Succeeded by vs. Iran Barkley |
| Preceded by vs. Clarismundo Aparecido Silva | Juan Roldán's bouts 29 October 1987 | Succeeded by vs. Miguel Angel Maldonado |
