= James Kinchen =

American boxer (born 1958)

Personal information
- Nickname: The Heat
- Born: March 1, 1958 (age 68) San Diego, California, U.S.
- Height: 5 ft 9 1/2 in (177 cm)
- Weight: Middleweight; Super-middleweight; Light-heavyweight

Boxing career
- Stance: Orthodox

Boxing record
- Total fights: 60
- Wins: 49
- Win by KO: 34
- Losses: 9
- Draws: 2

James Kinchen (born March 1, 1958) is an American former professional boxer who competed from 1980 to 1992. Nicknamed "the Heat", Kinchen is best known for his bout against Thomas Hearns for the inaugural WBO super middleweight title. He also challenged twice for world titles at light heavyweight.

== Amateur career ==
Kinchen started his career out of McKinney, Texas as a three-time Golden Gloves champion, as well as three-time Southwestern AAU champion. He ended his amateur career with a record of 127-12.

== Professional career ==
Kinchen made his professional debut on August 8, 1980, defeating O'Daniel Marks via first-round knockout (KO) at the Dallas Convention Center. He won his first title on November 24, 1984, stopping Alex Ramos via ninth-round KO for the USBA middleweight title. He later captured the vacant NABF super middleweight title on October 13, 1988 with a unanimous decision victory over Marvin Mack. Less than a month later he challenged Thomas Hearns for the newly-created WBO super middleweight title, replacing an injured Fulgencio Obelmejias. Kinchen knocked Hearns down in the fourth round of the fight, but ultimately lost a close majority decision. Kinchen also challenged for the WBA and IBF light-heavyweight world titles.

== Professional boxing record ==
49 Wins (34 KOs), 9 Losses (4 KOs), 2 Draws Archived 2015-03-30 at the Wayback Machine
| Result | Record | Opponent | Type | Round | Date | Location | Notes |
| Loss | 12-0 | (United States) Ernesto Magdaleno | TKO | 8 | 23/04/1992 | (United States) Marriott Hotel, Irvine, California, U.S. | |
| Win | 1-5 | (Mexico) Guillermo Chávez | KO | 4 | 29/08/1991 | (United States) Lakeside, California, U.S. | |
| Loss | 30-4-2 | (United States) Charles Williams | TKO | 2 | 20/04/1991 | (United States) Caesars Atlantic City, Atlantic City, New Jersey, U.S. | For IBF light-heavyweight title |
| Win | 16-13-1 | (United States) Tim Williams | PTS | 10 | 07/06/1990 | (United States) Honolulu, Hawaii, U.S. | |
| Win | 7-10-1 | (Dominican Republic) Jorge Amparo | PTS | 10 | 01/03/1990 | (United States) Palm Springs, California, U.S. | |
| Loss | 25-0 | (United States) Virgil Hill | TKO | 1 | 24/10/1989 | (United States) Bismarck Civic Center, Bismarck, North Dakota, U.S. | For WBA light-heavyweight title |
| Win | 15-17-3 | (United States) Stacy McSwain | TKO | 5 | 08/06/1989 | (United States) Trump Castle, Atlantic City, New Jersey, U.S. | |
| Loss | 22-0 | (France) Christophe Tiozzo | PTS | 10 | 31/03/1989 | Issy-les-Moulineaux, Hauts-de-Seine, France | |
| Loss | 45-3 | (United States) Thomas Hearns | MD | 12 | 04/11/1988 | (United States) Las Vegas Hilton, Las Vegas, Nevada, U.S. | For inaugural WBO super-middleweight title Lost NABF super-middleweight title |
| Win | 17-7-1 | (United States) Marvin Mack | UD | 12 | 13/10/1988 | (United States) Stateline, Nevada, U.S. | Won NABF super-middleweight title |
| Win | 3-4 | (Mexico) Juan Hernández | UD | 10 | 19/05/1988 | (United States) El Cortez Hotel, San Diego, California, U.S. | |
| Win | 0-1 | (United States) James Williams | KO | 4 | 02/05/1988 | Tijuana, Baja California, Mexico | |
| Win | 7-18-2 | (United States) Ricky Locke | KO | 3 | 17/03/1988 | (United States) San Diego, California, U.S. | |
| Win | 9-15 | (United States) Antonio Adame | KO | 2 | 26/02/1988 | Tijuana, Baja California, Mexico | |
| Win | 14-3-1 | (United States) Tim Williams | PTS | 12 | 27/01/1988 | (United States) San Diego, California, U.S. | Won California light-heavyweight title |
| Win | 11-3-3 | (United States) Milford Kemp | UD | 10 | 19/11/1987 | (United States) El Cortez Hotel, San Diego, California, U.S. | |
| Loss | 8-7-3 | (United States) Larry Musgrove | TD | 3 | 25/08/1987 | (United States) Reseda Country Club, Reseda, California, U.S. | |
| Win | 18-9 | (United States) Randy Smith | UD | 10 | 18/06/1987 | (United States) El Cortez Hotel, San Diego, California, U.S. | |
| Loss | 63-3-2 | (Argentina) Juan Roldán | TKO | 9 | 06/04/1987 | (United States) Caesars Palace, Las Vegas, Nevada, U.S. | |
| Loss | 19-3 | (United States) Iran Barkley | SD | 10 | 17/10/1986 | (United States) Cobo Arena, Detroit, Michigan, U.S. | |
| Win | 14-4 | (United States) Frank Minton | KO | 7 | 11/07/1986 | (United States) Sahara Hotel and Casino, Las Vegas, Nevada, U.S. | |
| Win | 12-2 | (United States) Frank Minton | TKO | 9 | 30/07/1985 | (United States) Tropicana Hotel & Casino, Atlantic City, New Jersey, U.S. | |
| Win | 23-8-1 | (United States) Buster Drayton | PTS | 10 | 14/04/1985 | (United Kingdom) York Hall, London, England | |
| Loss | 20-0 | (United States) James Shuler | SD | 12 | 16/02/1985 | (United States) The Sands, Atlantic City, New Jersey, U.S. | For NABF middleweight title |
| Win | 21-2-2 | (United States) Alex Ramos | KO | 9 | 24/11/1984 | (United States) Caesars Tahoe, Stateline, Nevada, U.S. | Won USBA middleweight title |
| Draw | 3-3 | (Dominican Republic) Jorge Amparo | PTS | 10 | 26/09/1984 | (United States) Harrah's Marina, Atlantic City, New Jersey, U.S. | |
| Win | 18-3-1 | (United States) Erwin Williams | TKO | 9 | 25/05/1984 | (United States) San Jose, California, U.S. | |
| Win | 2-2 | (United States) Al Rankin | TKO | 3 | 26/02/1984 | (United States) Beaumont Civic Center, Beaumont, Texas, U.S. | |
| Win | 40-10-1 | (United Kingdom) Murray Sutherland | UD | 10 | 19/11/1983 | (United States) St. Joseph Civic Arena, Saint Joseph, Missouri, U.S. | |
| Win | 0-1 | (United States) Juan Diaz | TKO | 2 | 13/08/1983 | (United States) The Dunes, Las Vegas, Nevada, U.S. | |
| Win | 3-10-2 | (Mexico) José Mireles | KO | 1 | 16/07/1983 | (United States) State Fair Coliseum, Dallas, Texas, U.S. | |
| Win | 13-15-6 | (United States) Felton Marshall | TKO | 9 | 28/05/1983 | (United States) Showboat Hotel and Casino, Las Vegas, Nevada, U.S. | |
| Win | 7-20-1 | (United States) Fred Reed | KO | 1 | 19/05/1983 | (United States) North Park Palisade Gardens, San Diego, California, U.S. | |
| Win | 1-4 | Ernesto Caballero | TKO | 8 | 07/04/1983 | (United States) North Park Palisade Gardens, San Diego, California, U.S. | |
| Win | 15-8 | (United States) Mike Clark | PTS | 10 | 20/01/1983 | (United States) North Park Palisade Gardens, San Diego, California, U.S. | |
| Win | 19-6 | (United States) Ralph Moncrief | PTS | 10 | 31/10/1982 | (United States) Great Gorge Resort, McAfee, New Jersey, U.S. | |
| Win | 28-20-4 | (United States) Tommy Howard | KO | 10 | 30/09/1982 | (United States) North Park Palisade Gardens, San Diego, California, U.S. | |
| Win | 10-0-1 | (United States) Odell Hadley | UD | 10 | 05/09/1982 | (United States) St. Joseph Civic Arena, Saint Joseph, Missouri, U.S. | |
| Win | 10-20-1 | (United States) Joe Gonsalves | KO | 5 | 27/08/1982 | (United States) San Jose, California, U.S. | |
| Win | 13-7-1 | (United States) Alejo Rodriguez | KO | 4 | 23/05/1982 | (United States) Showboat Hotel and Casino, Las Vegas, Nevada, U.S. | |
| Win | 15-4 | (United States) Leroy Green, Jr. | TKO | 9 | 27/03/1982 | (United States) Playboy Hotel and Casino, Atlantic City, New Jersey, U.S. | |
| Win | 40-20-1 | (United States) Rudy Robles | UD | 10 | 17/02/1982 | (United States) Silver Slipper, Las Vegas, Nevada, U.S. | |
| Win | 4-8-2 | (United States) Marvin Sanders | KO | 10 | 13/01/1982 | (United States) Silver Slipper, Las Vegas, Nevada, U.S. | |
| Win | 2-8 | (United States) Jesse Avila | TKO | 6 | 28/11/1981 | (United States) Silver Slipper, Las Vegas, Nevada, U.S. | |
| Win | 14-6 | (United States) Ronnie Brown | KO | 6 | 04/11/1981 | (United States) Silver Slipper, Las Vegas, Nevada, U.S. | |
| Win | 2-0-2 | (United States) Everett Conklin | KO | 6 | 30/09/1981 | (United States) Silver Slipper, Las Vegas, Nevada, U.S. | |
| Draw | 2-0 | (United States) Everett Conklin | PTS | 8 | 21/08/1981 | (United States) Caesars Palace, Las Vegas, Nevada, U.S. | |
| Win | 1-23-3 | (United States) Adolfo Rivas | KO | 2 | 29/07/1981 | (United States) Silver Slipper, Las Vegas, Nevada, U.S. | |
| Win | -- | Darryl Womack | KO | 2 | 08/07/1981 | (United States) Silver Slipper, Las Vegas, Nevada, U.S. | |
| Win | 0-11 | (United States) Ruben Rascon | KO | 1 | 17/06/1981 | (United States) Silver Slipper, Las Vegas, Nevada, U.S. | |
| Win | 14-10-1 | (United States) James Williams | KO | 2 | 12/06/1981 | (United States) San Diego Sports Arena, San Diego, California, U.S. | |
| Win | -- | (United States) Eddie Casper | KO | 2 | 03/06/1981 | (United States) Silver Slipper, Las Vegas, Nevada, U.S. | |
| Win | 5-5 | (United States) Mike Hutchinson | KO | 3 | 01/05/1981 | (United States) Sea World Pavilion, San Diego, California, U.S. | |
| Win | 2-15 | (United States) Larry Meyers | KO | 2 | 15/04/1981 | (United States) Las Vegas, Nevada, U.S. | |
| Win | 12-14-1 | (United States) Jimmy Owens | PTS | 6 | 25/03/1981 | (United States) Silver Slipper, Las Vegas, Nevada, U.S. | |
| Win | 2-2 | (United States) Danny Kirk | KO | 1 | 18/02/1981 | (United States) Silver Slipper, Las Vegas, Nevada, U.S. | |
| Win | -- | (United States) Fred Garcia | KO | 2 | 28/01/1981 | (United States) Sea World Pavilion, San Diego, California, U.S. | |
| Win | 0-1 | (United States) Henry Drummond | PTS | 4 | 21/01/1981 | (United States) Silver Slipper, Las Vegas, Nevada, U.S. | |
| Win | 8-8-1 | (United States) Larry Rayford | TKO | 2 | 23/09/1980 | (United States) Louisiana Superdome, New Orleans, Louisiana, U.S. | |
| Win | -- | O'Daniel Marks | KO | 1 | 08/08/1980 | (United States) Dallas Convention Center, Dallas, Texas, U.S. | |

== Pro boxing titles ==
- USBA middleweight champion
- NABF middleweight champion

== Personal life ==
Kinchen now resides in San Diego, California. Also a convert to the Church of God in Christ, longtime member now Pastor of Helping Hand COGIC.
