= Sugar Ray Leonard vs. Thomas Hearns II =

Professional boxing match

The War
- Date: June 12, 1989
- Venue: Caesars Palace, Paradise, Nevada, U.S.
- Title(s) on the line: WBC and WBO super middleweight titles

Tale of the tape
Boxer	Ray Leonard	Thomas Hearns
Nickname	Sugar	The Hitman
Hometown	Palmer Park, Maryland, U.S.	Detroit, Michigan, U.S.
Purse	$13,000,000	$11,000,000
Pre-fight record	35–1 (25 KO)	46–3 (38 KO)
Age	33 years	30 years, 7 months
Height	5 ft 10 in (178 cm)	6 ft 1 in (185 cm)
Weight	160 lb (73 kg)	162 1/2 lb (74 kg)
Style	Orthodox	Orthodox
Recognition	WBC; Super Middleweight Champion; 5-division world champion	WBO; Super Middleweight Champion; WBC; No. 1 Ranked Super Middleweight; 4–division world champion

Result
- 12-round split draw (112-113, 113-112, 112-112)

Sugar Ray Leonard vs. Thomas Hearns II, billed as The War, was a professional boxing match contested on June 12, 1989, for the WBC and WBO super middleweight titles. The fight ended in a split draw, meaning Leonard retained his respective title.

== Background ==
In January 1989, promoter Bob Arum announced the long-awaited rematch between reigning WBC super middleweight monarch "Sugar" Ray Leonard and reigning WBO super middleweight champion Thomas Hearns. The two fighters had met previously nearly 8 years before, with Leonard rallying in the 14th round to defeat Hearns by technical knockout after trailing on all three of the judge's scorecards. Both Leonard and Hearns had become five-division champions in their previous fights with Leonard capturing both the WBC light heavyweight and super middleweight after defeating Donny Lalonde on November 7, 1988, while Hearns had won the lightly regarded WBO super middleweight strap only three days before, after earning a close majority decision against James Kinchen. Leonard then vacated his light heavyweight title, deciding to stay in the super middleweight division. Leonard and Hearns agreed to fight at a catch-weight of 164 pounds rather than the 168-pound super middleweight limit. A $500,000 per pound fine was to be paid by one fighter to the other should either come into the fight above the catch-weight, though this turned out to not be an issue as Leonard weighed 160 pounds and Hearns came into the fight at 162.

Leonard was a 3 to 1 favourite. Hearns minor WBO belt was not on the line because Leonard refused to have anything to do with the WBO due to its involvement with fighters from apartheid South Africa.

On the day of the fight, Hearns' younger brother Henry was arrested for the shooting death of his girlfriend at a house Thomas owned in Detroit. Promoter Bob Arum went to the hotel Hearns was staying at to check on him and told the press "Tommy was angry at me for coming by and he said to me: This is not going to affect me. Look, I’m here to do a job--I’ve been waiting eight years to knock this guy out."

== The fight ==
Hearns scored the only two knockdowns of the fight, dropping Leonard in the third after grazing him with a right cross that caused Leonard to lose his footing and again in round 11 after landing consecutive right hands. Though Leonard did not score a knockdown over Hearns, he would have a big round five, winning the round 10–8 on all three scorecards after dominating Hearns throughout the round. Leonard would also win the 12th and final round on all three scorecards as well, though Judge Shirley would give Leonard a 10–8 round as opposed to the other two judges who scored it 10–9; had Shirley scored the round 10–9, Hearns would have been declared the winner by split decision.

In a hard-fought bout, Leonard and Hearns would go the full 12-round distance and ultimately fight to a split draw as one judge (Jerry Roth) scored the fight 113–112 for Hearns, another (Tom Kaczmarek) scored the fight the same albeit in Leonard's favor and the third (Dalby Shirley) had the fight even at 112–112. The draw was controversial as most who watched the match, including the television announcers had Hearns winning by enough to be surprised by the official scoring. The ringside crowd loudly protested the decision.

== Aftermath ==
Both fighters, however, accepted the decision with Leonard stating "I think we both showed we're champions. I accept the decision." and Hearns declaring, "I respect their decision. I'm proud I had a draw. The judges could have ruled that I lost. So I'm thankful for what I have."

== Fight card ==
Confirmed bouts:

Weight Class	Weight		vs.		Method	Round	Notes
Super Middleweight	164 lb	Ray Leonard (c–WBC)	vs.	Thomas Hearns (c–WBO)	SD	12/12	^{Note 1}
Featherweight	126 lb	Kennedy McKinney	def.	David Moreno	UD	6/6
Lightweight	135 lb	Manuel Medina	def.	Jorge Cazares	RTD	5/6
Heavyweight	200+ lb	Ray Mercer	def	Ken Crosby	KO	1/6
Light Heavyweight	175 lb	Andrew Maynard	def.	Stephen Schwan	KO	1/6
Flyweight	112 lb	Michael Carbajal	def.	Eduardo Nunez	KO	4/6
Welterweight	147 lb	Robert Wangila	def.	Buck Smith	MD	6/6

^Note 1 For WBC and WBO Super Middleweight titles

== Broadcasting ==
Country	Broadcaster
Mexico	Televisa
United Kingdom	Sky Channel
United States	HBO

Preceded by vs. Donny Lalonde	Sugar Ray Leonard's bouts 12 June 1989	Succeeded by vs. Roberto Durán III
Preceded by vs. James Kinche	Thomas Hearns's bouts 12 June 1989	Succeeded by vs. Michael Olajide
Awards
Preceded by Thomas Hearns vs. Iran Barkley	KO Magazine Upset of the Year; 1989	Succeeded by Mike Tyson vs. Buster Douglas
