= J. B. Williamson =

American boxing

Personal information
- Born: James Bennett Williamson; December 18, 1956 (age 69) Indianapolis, Indiana, U.S.
- Height: 6 ft 1 1/2 in (187 cm)
- Weight: Middleweight; Light heavyweight; Heavyweight

Boxing career
- Reach: 78 in (198 cm)
- Stance: Orthodox

Boxing record
- Total fights: 43
- Wins: 26
- Win by KO: 10
- Losses: 16
- Draws: 0
- No contests: 1

James Bennett Williamson (born December 18, 1956) is an American former professional boxer who held the World Boxing Council (WBC) light heavyweight title in 1985.

Williamson was also a veteran, serving with the United States Marine Corps.

== Professional career ==
Williamson turned pro in 1979 after a successful amateur career and won the Vacant WBC Light Heavyweight Title in 1985 in a decision over Prince Mama Mohammed. He lost the title in his first defense against Dennis Andries. Although he never challenged again for another major title, he moved up to heavyweight and continued fighting until 1995, losing matches against notable heavyweights Henry Akinwande, Peter McNeeley, Jimmy Thunder, and George Foreman.

== Professional boxing record ==
43 fights	26 wins	16 losses
By knockout	10	12
By decision	16	4
No contests	1	

No.	Result	Record	Opponent	Type	Round, time	Date	Location	Notes
43	Loss	26–16 (1)	(United States) Keith McKnight	TKO	1 (10)	1995-12-02	(United States) Lavergne	
42	Loss	26–15 (1)	(United States) Peter McNeeley	TKO	1 (8)	1994-10-08	(United States) Whitman Armory, Whitman	
41	Loss	26–14 (1)	(United States) Peter McNeeley	RTD	2 (8)	1994-06-24	(United States) Foxborough Raceway, Foxborough	
40	Loss	26–13 (1)	(United States) Bobby Crabtree	KO	5 (8)	1994-04-08	(United States) Fort Smith	
39	Loss	26–12 (1)	(United States) James Heath	TKO	3 (8)	1994-02-19	(United States) Coliseum, Charlotte	
38	Loss	26–11 (1)	(United States) Kenny Keene	TKO	4 (10)	1993-07-23	(United States) Hawks Memorial Stadium, Boise	
37	Loss	26–10 (1)	(Russia) Alexander Zolkin	TKO	4 (10)	1993-06-12	(United States) Columbus	
36	Loss	26–9 (1)	(United States) Art Tucker	TKO	5 (10)	1991-05-09	(United States) Newark	
35	Loss	26–8 (1)	(United Kingdom) Henry Akinwande	TKO	2 (8)	1991-03-06	(United Kingdom) Wembley Arena, Wembley	
34	Loss	26–7 (1)	(South Africa) Pierre Coetzer	PTS	10 (10)	1990-11-08	(United States) Biloxi	
33	Loss	26–6 (1)	(New Zealand) Jimmy Thunder	TKO	10 (10)	1990-07-14	(Australia) Jupiters Hotel & Casino, Broadbeach	
32	Win	26–5 (1)	(United States) Cleveland Woods	UD	8 (8)	1990-05-24	(United States) Bally's Las Vegas, Las Vegas	
31	Win	25–5 (1)	(United States) Gary Steiger	TKO	6 (10)	1990-04-21	(United States) Mackin Hall, Louisville	
30	Win	24–5 (1)	(United States) Danny Blake	UD	4 (4)	1989-12-07	(United States) Louisville	
29	NC	23–5 (1)	(United States) Dicky Ryan	ND	4 (4)	1989-09-26	(United States) Sherwood Club, Indianapolis	
28	Loss	23–5	(United States) George Foreman	TKO	5 (10)	1989-04-30	(United States) Moody Center, Galveston	
27	Win	23–4	(United States) Eddie Blevins	KO	1 (8)	1989-03-18	(United States) Bedford Middle School, Bedford	
26	Loss	22–4	(United States) Jesse Shelby	TKO	8 (10)	1986-11-18	(United States) The Forum, Inglewood	
25	Loss	22–3	(Argentina) Juan Roldán	PTS	10 (10)	1986-10-18	(Argentina) Estadio Luna Park, Buenos Aires	
24	Loss	22–2	(United Kingdom) Dennis Andries	SD	12 (12)	1986-04-30	(United Kingdom) Picketts Lock Stadium, Edmonton	Lost WBC light heavyweight title
23	Win	22–1	(Ghana) Prince Mama Mohammed	UD	12 (12)	1985-12-10	(United States) The Forum, Inglewood	Won vacant WBC light heavyweight title
22	Win	21–1	(United States) Grover Robinson	UD	12 (12)	1985-09-18	(United States) The Forum, Inglewood	
21	Win	20–1	(United States) Jimmy Bills	UD	10 (10)	1985-07-22	(United States) The Forum, Inglewood	
20	Win	19–1	(United States) Grover Robinson	UD	12 (12)	1985-04-22	(United States) The Forum, Inglewood	
19	Win	18–1	(United States) Chris Schwenke	UD	12 (12)	1985-01-16	(United States) Riviera Hotel & Casino, Las Vegas	
18	Win	17–1	(United States) Pete McIntyre	SD	10 (10)	1984-10-10	(United States) The Forum, Inglewood	
17	Win	16–1	(United States) James Salerno	TKO	3 (10)	1984-07-09	(United States) The Forum, Inglewood	
16	Win	15–1	(United States) James Williams	TKO	7 (10)	1984-04-24	(United States) Veterans Memorial Coliseum, Culver City	
15	Win	14–1	(United States) Dale Grant	TKO	9 (10)	1984-03-27	(United States) Country Club, Reseda	
14	Loss	13–1	(United States) Alex Ramos	UD	10 (10)	1983-05-01	(United States) Sands Casino Hotel, Atlantic City	
13	Win	13–0	(United Kingdom) Murray Sutherland	MD	10 (10)	1982-12-10	(United States) Caesars Palace, Sports Pavilion, Las Vegas	
12	Win	12–0	(United States) Lee Burkey	UD	8 (8)	1981-09-15	(United States) Caesars Tahoe, Stateline	
11	Win	11–0	(United States) Raham Muhammed	UD	8 (8)	1981-05-10	(United States) The Forum, Inglewood	
10	Win	10–0	(United States) Ted Sanders	UD	10 (10)	1980-11-29	(United States) Olympic Auditorium, Los Angeles	
9	Win	9–0	(Mexico) Antonio Adame	KO	6 (8)	1980-09-27	(United States) The Forum, Inglewood	
8	Win	8–0	(Mexico) Antonio Adame	UD	10 (10)	1980-06-19	(United States) U. of Puget Sound Fieldhouse, Tacoma	
7	Win	7–0	(United States) Jamie Thomas	UD	10 (10)	1980-06-14	(United States) Riverfront Coliseum, Cincinnati	
6	Win	6–0	(United States) Lander Clark	TKO	6 (6)	1980-05-04	(United States) Seattle Center Coliseum, Seattle	
5	Win	5–0	(United States) Danny Kirk	TKO	1 (6)	1980-03-28	(United States) U. of Puget Sound Fieldhouse, Tacoma	
4	Win	4–0	(Canada) Jose Martinez	KO	2 (6)	1980-03-09	(United States) Civic Center, Saint Paul	
3	Win	3–0	(United States) Ernie Rabotte	UD	6 (6)	1980-01-26	(United States) Sports Arena, Los Angeles	
2	Win	2–0	(United States) Mike Hickman	KO	1 (4)	1979-11-27	(United States) Sports Arena, Los Angeles	
1	Win	1–0	(United States) Dennis Mancino	UD	4 (4)	1979-10-27	(United States) Sports Arena, Los Angeles	Professional debut

== See also ==
- List of world light-heavyweight boxing champions

Sporting positions
Amateur boxing titles
Previous: Chuck Walker	U.S. light middleweight champion 1976	Next: Clinton Jackson
Previous: Clinton Jackson	U.S. light middleweight champion 1978	Next: Jeff Stoudemire
Regional boxing titles
Vacant Title last held by Leslie Stewart	WBC light-heavyweight champion Continental Americas title September 18 – December 10, 1985; Won world title	Vacant Title next held by Virgil Hill
World boxing titles
Vacant Title last held by Michael Spinks	WBC light-heavyweight champion December 10, 1985 – April 30, 1986	Succeeded by Dennis Andries
