= Dennis Andries vs. Thomas Hearns =

Boxing match

- Date: March 7, 1987
- Venue: Cobo Arena, Detroit, Michigan, U.S.
- Title(s) on the line: WBC light heavyweight title

Tale of the tape
Boxer	Dennis Andries	Thomas Hearns
Nickname	"The Hackney Rock"	"The Hitman"
Hometown	Hackney, London, U.K.	Detroit, Michigan, U.S.
Pre-fight record	28–6–2 (15 KO)	43–2 (36 KO)
Age	33 years, 4 months	28 years, 4 months
Height	5 ft 10 1/2 in (179 cm)	6 ft 1 in (185 cm)
Weight	173 1/2 lb (79 kg)	173 1/4 lb (79 kg)
Style	Orthodox	Orthodox
Recognition	WBC; Light Heavyweight Champion; The Ring; No. 3 Ranked Light Heavyweight	WBC/The Ring; No. 1 Ranked Middleweight; 2–division World champion

Result
- Hearns wins via 10th–round TKO

Dennis Andries vs. Thomas Hearns was a professional boxing match contested on March 7, 1987, for the WBC light heavyweight title.

== Background ==
In November 1986 2–division world champion Thomas Hearns had come to an agreement to face reigning WBC light heavyweight champion Dennis Andries. Hearns, who at the time had won world titles in both the welterweight and light middleweight divisions, decided to temporarily bypass an opportunity for a world title in the middleweight division and move up 15 pounds to the challenge for the light heavyweight title.

The fight was originally planned to take place on February 7 in Las Vegas, but Showtime, who owned the rights to broadcast the fight, chose to postpone the fight in hopes of instead scheduling it for a March 20 date in Hearns' native Detroit. Andries' manager was against postponing the fight to such a later date after Andries had already trained for the initial February date, as such the fight was moved to its final March 7 date. However it ultimately aired on ABC instead.

== The fight ==
Hearns would put forth one of his most dominating efforts as he scored six knockdowns over the overmatched Andries. After a mostly tactical first five rounds largely controlled by the challenger, Hearns would connect with a short right hand that dropped Andries for the first time and then was knocked down a further three times after numerous flurries by Hearns, though he was able to answer the referee's 10–count each time. As the WBC does not use the automatic knockout (three knockdowns in one round) rule that is enforced in WBA championship fights and in many state authorities, Andries was able to continue the fight though Hearns would take a commanding lead on the scorecards with a rare 10–5 round. Hearns would send Andries down for the fifth time with a right hook in the ninth round, but Andries would quickly get back up once again. In the tenth round, Hearns dropped Andries for the sixth and final time after ducking a wild swing by Andries and countering with a short right hand of his own. Andries was able to get back up, but the referee stopped the fight as Andries was too dazed to continue.

== Aftermath ==
Hearns reign as light heavyweight champion would be brief as he announced after the fight that he would go down in weight to challenge for a world title in the middleweight division stating "I want that fourth title" In his next fight Hearns would make history, becoming the first fighter to claim world titles in four different weight classes after knocking out Juan Roldán to claim the WBC middleweight title.

Andries would rebound from his loss to Hearns and would reclaim the WBC light heavyweight title after defeating Tony Willis 2 years later in 1989. After losing the title to Jeff Harding in his first defense, Andries would become capture his third light heavyweight title after knocking out Harding in their rematch, joining only Marvin Johnson at the time as the only three–time world champion in the light heavyweight division.

== Fight card ==
Confirmed bouts:

Weight Class	Weight		vs.		Method	Round	Notes
Light Heavyweight	175 lbs.	Thomas Hearns	def.	Dennis Andries (c)	TKO	10/12	^{Note 1}
Light Middleweight	154 lbs.	Milton McCrory	def.	Rafael Corona	TKO	1/12	^{Note 2}
Super Featherweight	130 lbs.	Erskine Wade	def.	Richard Campbell	TKO	3/8
Super Middleweight	168 lbs.	Philip Morefield	def.	Tim Richardson	TKO	2/8

^Note 1 For WBC Light Heavyweight title
^Note 2 For NABF Light Middleweight title

== Broadcasting ==
Country	Broadcaster
United Kingdom	ITV
United States	ABC

Preceded by vs. Tony Sibson	Dennis Andries's bouts 7 March 1987	Succeeded by vs. Robert Folley
Preceded by vs. Doug DeWitt	Thomas Hearns's bouts 7 March 1987	Succeeded by vs. Juan Roldán
