= Thomas Hearns vs. Iran Barkley =

Boxing match

Knockout Nite
- Date: June 6, 1988
- Venue: Las Vegas Hilton, Winchester, Nevada, U.S.
- Title(s) on the line: WBC middleweight title

Tale of the tape
| Boxer | Thomas Hearns | Iran Barkley |
| Nickname | The Hitman | The Blade |
| Hometown | Detroit, Michigan, U.S. | The Bronx, New York, U.S. |
| Purse | $1,500,000 | $250,000 |
| Pre-fight record | 45–2 (38 KO) | 24–4 (15 KO) |
| Age | 29 years, 7 months | 28 years, 1 month |
| Height | 6 ft 1 in (185 cm) | 6 ft 1 in (185 cm) |
| Weight | 160 lb (73 kg) | 160 lb (73 kg) |
| Style | Orthodox | Orthodox |
| Recognition | WBC; Middleweight Champion; The Ring; No. 1 Ranked Middleweight; 4-division world champion | WBC; No. 2 Ranked Middleweight; The Ring; No. 6 Ranked Middleweight |

Result
- Barkley wins via 3rd-round KO

Thomas Hearns vs. Iran Barkley, billed as Knockout Nite, was a professional boxing match contested on June 6, 1988, for the WBC middleweight title. It is widely regarded as one of the biggest upsets in boxing history, and one of the most unexpected endings to a fight.

== Background ==
In his previous fight on October 29, 1987, Thomas Hearns had captured the middleweight title after knocking out Juan Roldán becoming the first four-division world champion in boxing history.

Then on March 6, 1988, Iran Barkley beat Michael Olajide by technical knockout, becoming a top contender to WBC middleweight champion Thomas Hearns in the process. Two weeks after Barkley's victory, the fight between Hearns and Barkley became official. Having had only one title fight before his fight with Hearns, Barkley came into the fight as a 4–1 underdog.

== The fight ==
Hearns controlled the first two rounds, landing punches almost at will and winning both rounds on all three scorecards. Midway through the first round, Hearns had opened up a cut above Barkley's left eye, and by the end of the second Barkley had a cut above both his right eye and lower lip. In round three, Barkley got off to a quick start, but Hearns took control and hammered Barkley with body shots throughout the round. However, in the final minute of the round, Hearns threw a left jab and then briefly dropped his hands as he attempted to move to his left when Barkley caught him flush with a powerful right hand and then landed another as Hearns fell to the canvas. Clearly hurt from the exchange, Hearns struggled to get back up and barely answered the referee's 10-count. Hearns was allowed to continue, but was immediately met with a barrage from Barkley which sent him through the ropes. Referee Richard Steele would step in and stop the fight giving Barkley the victory at 2:39 of the round.

== Aftermath ==
The Ring magazine named the fight their Upset of the Year for 1988.

== Fight card ==
Confirmed bouts:

| Weight Class | Weight | | vs. | | Method | Round | Notes |
|---|---|---|---|---|---|---|---|
| Middleweight | 160 lb | Iran Barkley | def. | Thomas Hearns (c) | KO | 3/12 | ^{Note 1} |
| Super Lightweight | 140 lb | Roger Mayweather (c) | def. | Harold Brazier | SD | 12/12 |
| Light Heavyweight | 175 lb | Virgil Hill (c) | def. | Ramzi Hassan | UD | 12/12 |
| Super Bantamweight | 122 lb | Fabrice Benichou | def. | Efren Chavez | UD | 8/8 |
| Light Heavyweight | 175 lb | Michael Moorer | def. | Keith McMurray | TKO | 2/4 |

^Note 1 For WBC Middleweight title
^Note 2 For WBC Super Lightweight title
^Note 3 For WBA Light Heavyweight title

== Broadcasting ==
| Country | Broadcaster |
|---|---|
| United Kingdom | ITV |
| United States | Showtime |

| Preceded by vs. Juan Roldán | Thomas Hearns's bouts 6 June 1988 | Succeeded by vs. James Kinchen |
| Preceded by vs. Michael Olajide | Iran Barkley's bouts 6 June 1988 | Succeeded by vs. Roberto Durán |
Awards
| Preceded by Marvin Hagler vs. Sugar Ray Leonard | The Ring Upset of the Year; 1988 | Succeeded by Donald Curry vs. René Jacquot |
| Preceded by Marvin Hagler vs. Sugar Ray Leonard | KO Magazine Upset of the Year; 1988 | Next: Sugar Ray Leonard vs. Thomas Hearns II |
| Preceded by Mike McCallum vs. Donald Curry | KO Magazine Knockout of the Year; 1988 | Next: Michael Nunn vs. Sumbu Kalambay |
