= Stoudamire =

Stoudamire is a surname. Notable people with the surname include:

- Damon Stoudamire (born 1973), American basketball player and coach
- Salim Stoudamire (born 1982), American basketball player, cousin of Damon

== See also ==
- Stoudamire, an album by Kevin Seconds
- Stoudemire, a surname
