= Thomas Hearns =

American boxer (born 1958)

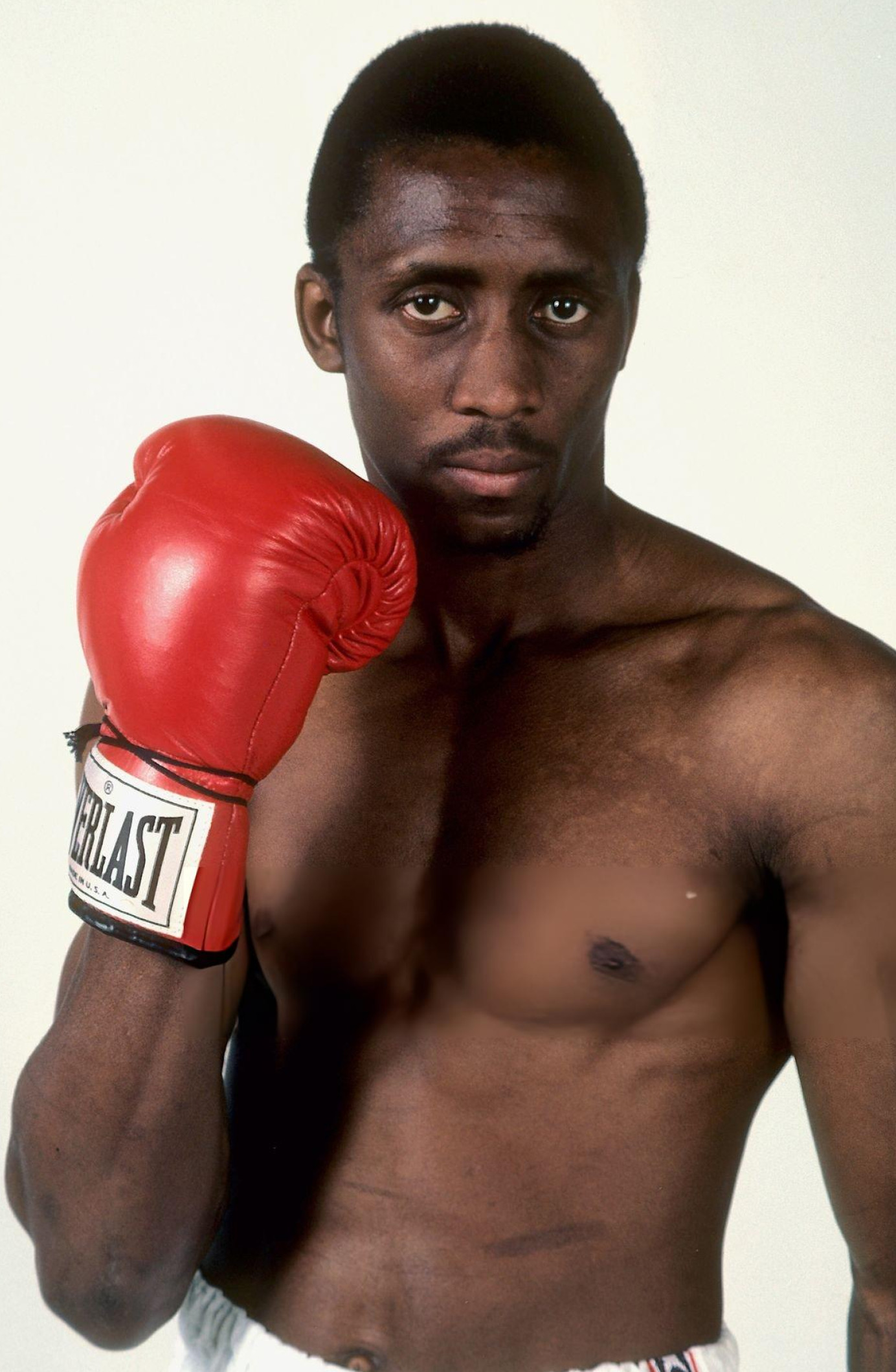
- Hearns in 1981

Personal information
- Nicknames: The Hitman; Motor City Cobra
- Born: October 18, 1958 (age 67) Grand Junction, Tennessee, U.S.
- Height: 6 ft 1 in (185 cm)
- Weight: Welterweight; Light middleweight; Middleweight; Super middleweight; Light heavyweight; Cruiserweight

Boxing career
- Reach: 78 in (198 cm)
- Stance: Orthodox

Boxing record
- Total fights: 67
- Wins: 61
- Win by KO: 48
- Losses: 5
- Draws: 1

Thomas Hearns (born October 18, 1958) is an American former professional boxer who competed from 1977 to 2006. Nicknamed the "Motor City Cobra," and more famously "the Hitman," Hearns' tall, slender build and long arms and broad shoulders allowed him to move up over fifty pounds (23 kg) in his career and become the first boxer in history to win world titles in five weight divisions: welterweight, light middleweight, middleweight, super middleweight, and light heavyweight.

Hearns was named Fighter of the Year by The Ring magazine and the Boxing Writers Association of America in 1980 and 1984; the latter following his knockout of Roberto Durán. Hearns was known as a devastating puncher throughout his career, even at cruiserweight, despite having climbed up five weight classes. He is ranked number 18 on The Ring's list of 100 greatest punchers of all time. He currently ranks #78 in BoxRec ranking of the greatest pound for pound boxers of all time. On June 10, 2012, Hearns was inducted into the International Boxing Hall of Fame.

== Early life ==
Hearns was born in Grand Junction, Tennessee, on October 18, 1958, the youngest of three children in his mother's first marriage. With her second marriage, six children joined the first three. On her own, Mrs. Hearns raised Tommy and his siblings in Grand Junction until Tommy was five years old; then the family moved to Detroit, Michigan. Hearns had an amateur record of 155–8. In 1977, he won the National Amateur Athletic Union Light Welterweight Championship, defeating Bobby Joe Young of Steubenville, Ohio, in the finals. He also won the 1977 National Golden Gloves Light Welterweight Championship.

== Professional career ==
Hearns began his professional boxing career in Detroit, Michigan, under the tutelage of Emanuel Steward in 1977. Steward changed Hearns from a light hitting amateur boxer to one of the most devastating punchers in boxing history.

He won six major world titles in five weight classes during his pro career, defeating future boxing hall of famers such as José "Pipino" Cuevas, Wilfred Benítez, Virgil Hill and Roberto Durán. In addition, he won the IBO title at Cruiserweight.

Hearns started his career by knocking out his first 17 opponents. In 1980, Hearns carried his 28–0 record into a world title match against Mexico's Cuevas. Hearns ended Cuevas's 4-year reign by beating him by TKO in the second round. Hearns was voted "Fighter of the Year" by Ring Magazine in 1980.

=== Hearns vs. Leonard ===
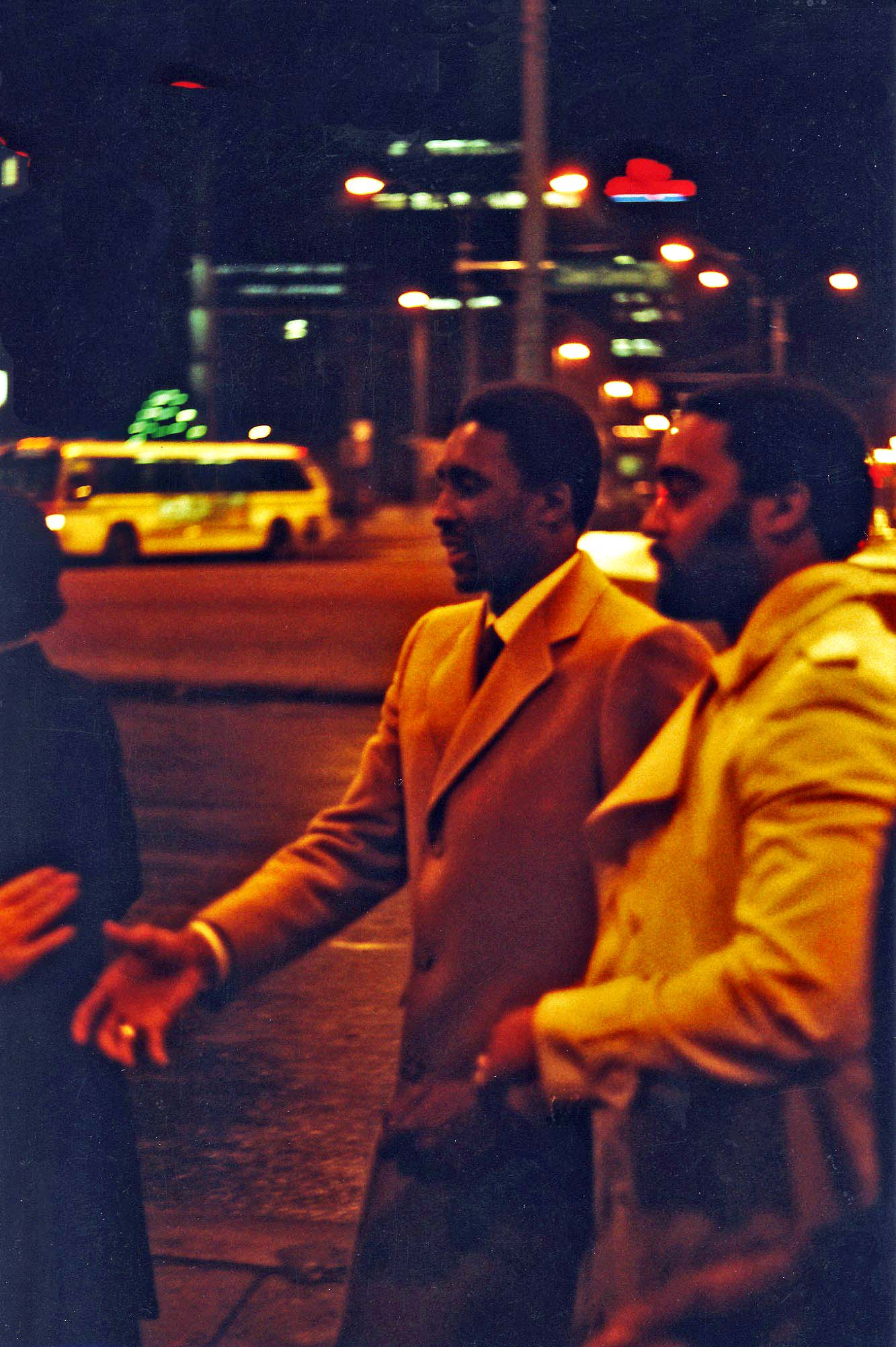
Hearns, center, in Detroit, December 1981.

In 1981, Hearns the WBA Champion, with a 32–0 record (30 KOs), fought WBC Champion Sugar Ray Leonard (30–1) to unify the World Welterweight Championship in a bout dubbed "The Showdown". In this fight, Hearns suffered his first professional defeat when Leonard stopped him in the 14th round. In the 13th round, Leonard, behind on points on all 3 judges scorecards, needed a knockout to win. He came on strong and put Hearns through the ropes at the end of the round. Hearns was dazed, totally out of gas and received a count but was saved by the bell. Leonard, with his left eye shut and time running out, resumed his attack in the 14th. Hearns started the round boxing and moving, but after staggering Hearns with an overhand right, Leonard pinned Hearns against the ropes. After another combination to the body and head, referee Davey Pearl stopped the fight. Hearns and Leonard banked a combined 17 million dollars for the fight, making it the largest purse in sports history at the time. The following year, Leonard retired due to a detached retina, and there would be no rematch until 1989.

=== Light Middleweight Champion ===
Hearns moved up in weight and won the WBC Super Welterweight (154 lb) title from boxing legend and three-time world champion Wilfred Benítez (44–1–1) in New Orleans in December 1982, and defended that title against European Champion Luigi Minchillo (42–1) (W 12), Roberto Durán (TKO 2), no.1 contender Fred Hutchings (29–1) (KO 3) and #1 contender Mark Medal (26–2) (TKO 8). During his reign at this weight, the 2 round destruction of Roberto Durán, in which he became the first boxer to KO Durán, is seen as his pinnacle achievement, earning him his second Ring Magazine "Fighter of the Year" award in 1984.

=== Hagler vs Hearns ===
While remaining super-welterweight (light-middleweight) champion, Hearns ventured into the middleweight division to challenge undisputed middleweight champion Marvin Hagler in 1985. Billed "The Fight" (later known as "The War"), this bout has often been labeled as the three greatest rounds in boxing history. The battle elevated both fighters to superstar status. Hearns was able to stun Hagler soon after the opening bell, but he subsequently broke his right hand in the first round. He did, however, manage to open a deep cut on Hagler's forehead that caused referee Richard Steele to call a time out; the ring doctor examined the cut over Hagler's right eye and said, "let him go." The fight was allowed to continue at this point, with the ringside commentators remarking on the fact that, "the last thing Hagler wants or needs is for this fight to be stopped on a cut." The battle did go back and forth some, but Hearns was unable to capitalize on his early successes against Hagler. As a result of breaking his right hand, Hearns began to use lateral movement and a good jab to keep Hagler at bay as best he could. This tactic worked fairly well, but in the third round Hagler staggered Hearns and managed to catch him against the ropes, where a crushing right hand by Hagler knocked Hearns down. Hearns beat the count but was clearly unable to continue and the referee decided to stop the fight. Despite the loss, Hearns garnered a tremendous amount of respect from fans and boxing aficionados alike. Considering the popularity of the fight and the level of competition, a rematch seemed to be a foregone conclusion and was highly anticipated, but it never took place.

=== Comeback ===
Hearns quickly made amends by dispatching undefeated rising star James "Black Gold" Shuler with a devastating first-round knockout in 1986. One week after the fight, Shuler was killed in a motorcycle accident. Hearns presented the NABF championship belt to Shuler's family at his funeral, saying he deserved to keep the belt as he had held it longer than Hearns.

In March 1987, Hearns scored six knockdowns of Dennis Andries to win the WBC light-heavyweight title with a tenth round stoppage at Cobo Hall, Detroit, Michigan. Later that year, his four-round destruction of Juan Roldán (63–2) to claim the vacant WBC middleweight title made Hearns a four-weight world champion.

In a huge upset, Hearns lost his WBC middleweight title to Iran Barkley via a third-round TKO in June 1988 in a bout Ring Magazine named 1988 Upset of the Year. In November that year, Hearns returned to win another world title, defeating James Kinchen (44–3) via a majority decision to win the inaugural WBO super-middleweight title. Hearns became the first boxer to win a world title in five weight divisions.

=== Rematch with Leonard ===
Hearns had to wait until 1989 for a rematch with Sugar Ray Leonard, this time for Leonard's WBC super-middleweight title and Hearns's WBO title. This was Hearns's sixth Superfight, a fight which much of the public believed Hearns won, flooring Leonard in both the 3rd and 11th rounds. However, the judges scored the fight a controversial draw.

=== Later career ===
Hearns had one last headline performance in 1991, as he challenged the undefeated WBA light-heavyweight champion Virgil Hill. In Hill's eleventh defense of the title, Hearns returned to his amateur roots and outboxed the champion to win a decision and add a sixth world title to his decorated career. On March 20, 1992, Hearns lost this title on a split decision to Iran Barkley but continued to compete and won his next 8 bouts.

On June 23, 1997, Hearns appeared on a WWF telecast, performing in a storyline where he was taunted and challenged by professional wrestler Bret "Hitman" Hart, who claimed that Hearns stole the "Hitman" nickname. Hearns ended up attacking Jim Neidhart and knocking him down with a series of punches before officials entered the ring and broke up the confrontation.

On November 6, 1998, Hearns had a boxing fight which featured a rare, double knockdown. In it, Hearns and opponent Jay Snyder landed punches simultaneously during the very first round, Hearns a devastating right hand to Snyder's chin and Snyder a left jab to Hearns's chin. Hearns was able to get up before the referee's count reached ten seconds; Snyder was not and Hearns won by first-round knockout.

On April 10, 1999, Hearns travelled to England and beat Nate Miller by unanimous decision to win the IBO cruiserweight title. In his next fight in April 2000 he lost the title to Uriah Grant. The first round was competitive, with Hearns appearing hurt by a solid right to the jaw. Both fighters traded blows in the second round until Hearns appeared to injure his right ankle. He was forced to retire injured at the end of the round. The crowd booed and Hearns took the microphone and promised his fans that he would be back. Hearns fought twice more, winning both fights by TKO. His final fight was on 4 February 2006 against Shannon Landberg.

== Personal life ==
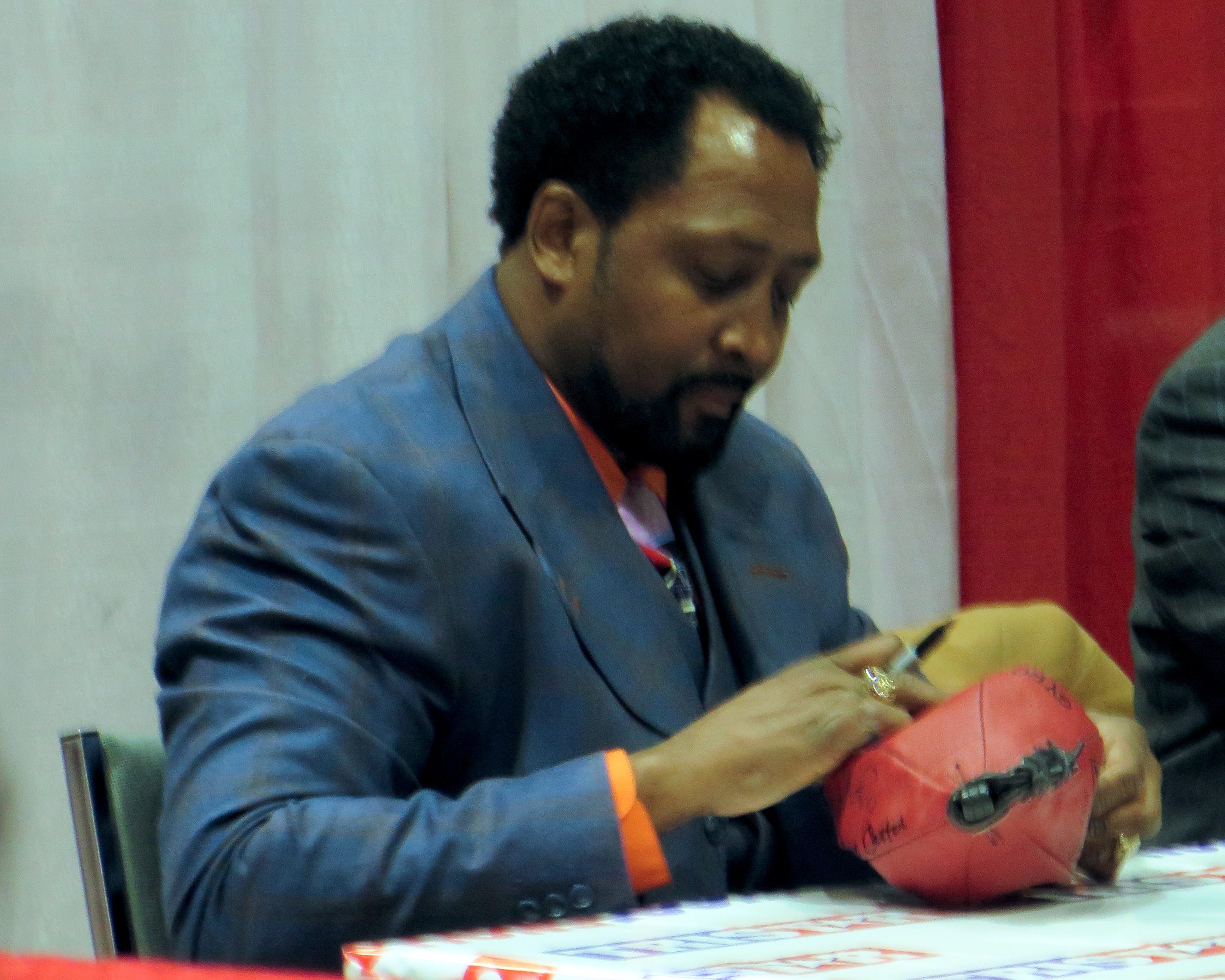
Hearns signs autographs in Houston in January 2014

Hearns's family is a fixture on the Detroit sports scene. His mother, Lois Hearns, is a fight promoter. Their company, Hearns Entertainment, has promoted many cards, including the Mike Tyson–Andrew Golota bout in 2000. His son Ronald Hearns is also a boxer, and he fought on the undercard of his father's last couple of fights. Hearns lives in Southfield, Michigan (a suburb of Detroit). Hearns serves as a Reserve Police Officer with the Detroit Police Department. He is also remembered for visiting U.S. servicemen during the Gulf War.

Due to personal financial issues, Hearns was forced to auction off his possessions at The Auction Block of Detroit, Michigan, on April 3, 2010. Items included were a 1957 Chevy, 47' Fountain boat, and a slew of collectible memorabilia. His debt to the IRS was $250,000. He took responsibility for repaying the entire debt, which he said was accrued from being overly generous toward his large extended family.

In 2012, Hearns was ticketed for parking in the middle of the road. He subsequently paid the ticket. His ticketing was featured in Parking Wars.

In 2024, Hearns appeared on stage at a Trump rally in Detroit.

== Professional boxing record ==
| 67 fights | 61 wins | 5 losses |
|---|---|---|
| By knockout | 48 | 4 |
| By decision | 13 | 1 |
| Draws | 1 | |

| No. | Result | Record | Opponent | Type | Round, time | Date | Location | Notes |
|---|---|---|---|---|---|---|---|---|
| 67 | Win | 61–5–1 | Shannon Landberg | TKO | 10 (10), 1:35 | Feb 4, 2006 | The Palace of Auburn Hills, Auburn Hills, Michigan, U.S. | |
| 66 | Win | 60–5–1 | John Long | TKO | 9 (10) | Jul 30, 2005 | Cobo Arena, Detroit, Michigan, U.S. | |
| 65 | Loss | 59–5–1 | Uriah Grant | RTD | 3 (12), 3:00 | Apr 8, 2000 | Joe Louis Arena, Detroit, Michigan, U.S. | Lost IBO cruiserweight title |
| 64 | Win | 59–4–1 | Nate Miller | UD | 12 | Apr 10, 1999 | MEN Arena, Manchester, England | Won vacant IBO cruiserweight title |
| 63 | Win | 58–4–1 | Jay Snyder | KO | 1 (10), 1:28 | Nov 6, 1998 | Joe Louis Arena, Detroit, Michigan, U.S. | |
| 62 | Win | 57–4–1 | Ed Dalton | KO | 5 (10), 2:47 | Jan 31, 1997 | Great Western Forum, Inglewood, California, U.S. | |
| 61 | Win | 56–4–1 | Karl Willis | KO | 5 (10), 2:45 | Nov 29, 1996 | Civic Center, Roanoke, Virginia, U.S. | |
| 60 | Win | 55–4–1 | Earl Butler | UD | 10 | Sep 26, 1995 | The Palace, Auburn Hills, Michigan, U.S. | |
| 59 | Win | 54–4–1 | Lenny LaPaglia | TKO | 1 (12), 2:55 | Mar 31, 1995 | Detroit, Michigan, U.S. | Won vacant WBU cruiserweight title |
| 58 | Win | 53–4–1 | Freddie Delgado | UD | 12 | Feb 19, 1994 | Coliseum, Charlotte, North Carolina, U.S. | Retained NABF cruiserweight title |
| 57 | Win | 52–4–1 | Dan Ward | TKO | 1 (12), 2:09 | Jan 29, 1994 | MGM Grand Garden Arena, Paradise, Nevada, U.S. | Won vacant NABF cruiserweight title |
| 56 | Win | 51–4–1 | Andrew Maynard | TKO | 1 (10), 2:34 | Nov 6, 1993 | Caesars Palace, Paradise, Nevada, U.S. | |
| 55 | Loss | 50–4–1 | Iran Barkley | SD | 12 | Mar 20, 1992 | Caesars Palace, Paradise, Nevada, U.S. | Lost WBA light heavyweight title |
| 54 | Win | 50–3–1 | Virgil Hill | UD | 12 | Jun 3, 1991 | Caesars Palace, Paradise, Nevada, U.S. | Won WBA light heavyweight title |
| 53 | Win | 49–3–1 | Ken Atkins | TKO | 3 (10), 2:08 | Apr 6, 1991 | Aloha Stadium, Honolulu, Hawaii, U.S. | |
| 52 | Win | 48–3–1 | Kemper Morton | KO | 2 (10), 2:02 | Feb 11, 1991 | Great Western Forum, Inglewood, California, U.S. | |
| 51 | Win | 47–3–1 | Michael Olajide | UD | 12 | Apr 28, 1990 | Etess Arena, Atlantic City, New Jersey, U.S. | Retained WBO super middleweight title |
| 50 | Draw | 46–3–1 | Sugar Ray Leonard | SD | 12 | Jun 12, 1989 | Caesars Palace, Paradise, Nevada, U.S. | Retained WBO super middleweight title; For WBC super middleweight title |
| 49 | Win | 46–3 | James Kinchen | MD | 12 | Nov 4, 1988 | Las Vegas Hilton, Winchester, Nevada, U.S. | Won NABF and inaugural WBO super middleweight titles |
| 48 | Loss | 45–3 | Iran Barkley | TKO | 3 (12), 2:39 | Jun 6, 1988 | Las Vegas Hilton, Winchester, Nevada, U.S. | Lost WBC middleweight title |
| 47 | Win | 45–2 | Juan Roldán | KO | 4 (12), 2:01 | Oct 29, 1987 | Las Vegas Hilton, Winchester, Nevada, U.S. | Won vacant WBC middleweight title |
| 46 | Win | 44–2 | Dennis Andries | TKO | 10 (12), 1:26 | Mar 7, 1987 | Cobo Hall, Detroit, Michigan, U.S. | Won WBC light heavyweight title |
| 45 | Win | 43–2 | Doug DeWitt | UD | 12 | Oct 17, 1986 | Cobo Arena, Detroit, Michigan, U.S. | Retained NABF middleweight title |
| 44 | Win | 42–2 | Mark Medal | TKO | 8 (12), 2:20 | Jun 23, 1986 | Caesars Palace, Paradise, Nevada, U.S. | Retained WBC and The Ring light middleweight titles |
| 43 | Win | 41–2 | James Shuler | KO | 1 (12), 1:13 | Mar 10, 1986 | Caesars Palace, Paradise, Nevada, U.S. | Won NABF middleweight title |
| 42 | Loss | 40–2 | Marvin Hagler | TKO | 3 (12), 1:52 | Apr 15, 1985 | Caesars Palace, Paradise, Nevada, U.S. | For WBA, WBC, IBF, and The Ring middleweight titles |
| 41 | Win | 40–1 | Fred Hutchings | TKO | 3 (12), 2:56 | Sep 15, 1984 | Civic Center, Saginaw, Michigan, U.S. | Retained WBC and The Ring light middleweight titles |
| 40 | Win | 39–1 | Roberto Durán | TKO | 2 (12), 1:05 | Jun 15, 1984 | Caesars Palace, Paradise, Nevada, U.S. | Retained WBC and The Ring light middleweight titles |
| 39 | Win | 38–1 | Luigi Minchillo | UD | 12 | Feb 11, 1984 | Joe Louis Arena, Detroit, Michigan, U.S. | Retained WBC and The Ring light middleweight titles |
| 38 | Win | 37–1 | Murray Sutherland | UD | 10 | Jul 10, 1983 | Caesars Boardwalk Regency, Atlantic City, New Jersey, U.S. | |
| 37 | Win | 36–1 | Wilfred Benítez | MD | 15 | Dec 3, 1982 | Superdome, New Orleans, Louisiana, U.S. | Won WBC and vacant The Ring light middleweight titles |
| 36 | Win | 35–1 | Jeff McCracken | TKO | 8 (10), 1:29 | Jul 25, 1982 | Cobo Hall, Detroit, Michigan, U.S. | |
| 35 | Win | 34–1 | Marcos Geraldo | KO | 1 (10), 1:48 | Feb 27, 1982 | The Aladdin, Paradise, Nevada, U.S. | |
| 34 | Win | 33–1 | Ernie Singletary | UD | 10 | Dec 11, 1981 | Queen Elizabeth's Sports Centre, Nassau, Bahamas | |
| 33 | Loss | 32–1 | Sugar Ray Leonard | TKO | 14 (15), 1:45 | Sep 16, 1981 | Caesars Palace, Paradise, Nevada, U.S. | Lost WBA welterweight title; For WBC and The Ring welterweight titles |
| 32 | Win | 32–0 | Pablo Baez | TKO | 4 (15), 2:10 | Jun 25, 1981 | Astrodome, Houston, Texas, U.S. | Retained WBA welterweight title |
| 31 | Win | 31–0 | Randy Shields | TKO | 12 (15), 3:00 | Apr 25, 1981 | Veterans Memorial Coliseum, Phoenix, Arizona, U.S. | Retained WBA welterweight title |
| 30 | Win | 30–0 | Luis Primera | KO | 6 (15), 2:00 | Dec 6, 1980 | Joe Louis Arena, Detroit, Michigan, U.S. | Retained WBA welterweight title |
| 29 | Win | 29–0 | José Cuevas | TKO | 2 (15), 2:39 | Aug 2, 1980 | Joe Louis Arena, Detroit, Michigan, U.S. | Won WBA welterweight title |
| 28 | Win | 28–0 | Eddie Gazo | KO | 1 (10), 2:41 | May 3, 1980 | Cobo Hall, Detroit, Michigan, U.S. | |
| 27 | Win | 27–0 | Santiago Valdez | TKO | 1 (10), 2:56 | Mar 31, 1980 | Caesars Palace, Paradise, Nevada, U.S. | |
| 26 | Win | 26–0 | Ángel Espada | TKO | 4 (12), 0:47 | Mar 2, 1980 | Joe Louis Arena, Detroit, Michigan, U.S. | Won vacant USBA welterweight title |
| 25 | Win | 25–0 | Jim Richards | KO | 3 (10), 2:27 | Feb 3, 1980 | Caesars Palace, Paradise, Nevada, U.S. | |
| 24 | Win | 24–0 | Mike Colbert | UD | 10 | Nov 30, 1979 | Superdome, New Orleans, Louisiana, U.S. | |
| 23 | Win | 23–0 | Saensak Muangsurin | TKO | 3 (10), 2:31 | Oct 18, 1979 | Olympia, Detroit, Michigan, U.S. | |
| 22 | Win | 22–0 | José Figueroa | KO | 3 (10), 1:17 | Sep 22, 1979 | Sports Arena, Los Angeles, California, U.S. | |
| 21 | Win | 21–0 | Inocencio De la Rosa | RTD | 2 (10) | Aug 23, 1979 | Cobo Arena, Detroit, Michigan, U.S. | |
| 20 | Win | 20–0 | Bruce Curry | KO | 3 (10), 2:59 | Jun 28, 1979 | Olympia, Detroit, Michigan, U.S. | |
| 19 | Win | 19–0 | Harold Weston | RTD | 6 (12) | May 20, 1979 | Dunes, Paradise, Nevada, U.S. | |
| 18 | Win | 18–0 | Alfonso Hayman | UD | 10 | Apr 3, 1979 | Spectrum, Philadelphia, Pennsylvania, U.S. | |
| 17 | Win | 17–0 | Segundo Murillo | TKO | 8 (10), 2:25 | Mar 3, 1979 | Olympia, Detroit, Michigan, U.S. | |
| 16 | Win | 16–0 | Sammy Ruckard | TKO | 8 (10) | Jan 31, 1979 | Saginaw, Michigan, U.S. | |
| 15 | Win | 15–0 | Clyde Gray | TKO | 10 (10), 2:03 | Jan 11, 1979 | Olympia, Detroit, Michigan, U.S. | |
| 14 | Win | 14–0 | Rudy Barro | KO | 4 (10) | Dec 9, 1978 | Cobo Arena, Detroit, Michigan, U.S. | |
| 13 | Win | 13–0 | Pedro Rojas | TKO | 1 (10), 1:09 | Oct 26, 1978 | Olympia, Detroit, Michigan, U.S. | |
| 12 | Win | 12–0 | Bruce Finch | KO | 3 (10), 2:01 | Sep 7, 1978 | Olympia, Detroit, Michigan, U.S. | |
| 11 | Win | 11–0 | Eddie Marcelle | KO | 2 (10), 2:59 | Aug 3, 1978 | Olympia, Detroit, Michigan, U.S. | |
| 10 | Win | 10–0 | Raul Aguirre | KO | 2 (10), 2:08 | Jul 20, 1978 | Olympia, Detroit, Michigan, U.S. | |
| 9 | Win | 9–0 | Jimmy Rothwell | KO | 1 (10), 1:49 | Jun 8, 1978 | Olympia, Detroit, Michigan, U.S. | |
| 8 | Win | 8–0 | Tyrone Phelps | TKO | 3 (10), 2:08 | Mar 31, 1978 | Saginaw, Michigan, U.S. | |
| 7 | Win | 7–0 | Ray Fields | TKO | 2, 2:15 | Mar 17, 1978 | Cobo Arena, Detroit, Michigan, U.S. | |
| 6 | Win | 6–0 | Billy Goodwin | TKO | 2, 1:18 | Feb 17, 1978 | Civic Center, Saginaw, Michigan, U.S. | |
| 5 | Win | 5–0 | Robert Adams | TKO | 3 (6), 2:45 | Feb 10, 1978 | Olympia, Detroit, Michigan, U.S. | |
| 4 | Win | 4–0 | Anthony House | KO | 2, 2:00 | Jan 29, 1978 | Hyatt Regency, Knoxville, Tennessee, U.S. | |
| 3 | Win | 3–0 | Willie Wren | TKO | 3 (6), 2:41 | Dec 16, 1977 | Olympia, Detroit, Michigan, U.S. | |
| 2 | Win | 2–0 | Jerry Strickland | KO | 3 (6), 1:27 | Dec 7, 1977 | Hillcrest Country Club, Mount Clemens, Michigan, U.S. | |
| 1 | Win | 1–0 | Jerome Hill | KO | 2 (4), 1:59 | Nov 25, 1977 | Olympia, Detroit, Michigan, U.S. | |

== Titles in boxing ==
=== Major world titles ===
- WBA welterweight champion (147 lbs)
- WBC light middleweight champion (154 lbs)
- WBC middleweight champion (160 lbs)
- WBO super middleweight champion (Note: Won the inaugural title on November 4, 1988.) (168 lbs)
- WBA light heavyweight champion (175 lbs)
- WBC light heavyweight champion (175 lbs)

=== The Ring magazine titles ===
- The Ring light middleweight champion (154 lbs)

=== Minor world titles ===
- IBO cruiserweight champion (200 lbs)
- WBU cruiserweight champion (200 lbs)

=== Regional/International titles ===
- USBA welterweight champion (147 lbs)
- NABF middleweight champion (160 lbs)
- NABF super middleweight champion (168 lbs)
- NABF cruiserweight champion (200 lbs)

== See also ==
- List of boxing quintuple champions

== Notes and references ==
=== References ===
Sporting positions
Amateur boxing titles
| Previous: Ronnie Shields | U.S. Golden Gloves light welterweight champion 1977 | Next: Ronnie Shields |
Regional boxing titles
| New title | USBA welterweight champion March 2, 1980 – August 1980; Vacated | Vacant Title next held by Kevin Morgan |
| Preceded by James Shuler | NABF middleweight champion March 10, 1986 – October 1987; Vacated | Vacant Title next held by Michael Nunn |
| Preceded by James Kinchen | NABF super middleweight champion November 4, 1988 – April 1989; Vacated | Vacant Title next held by Don Lee |
| Vacant Title last held by Orlin Norris | NABF cruiserweight champion January 29, 1994 – February 23, 1994; Vacated | Vacant Title next held by Adolpho Washington |
Minor world boxing titles
| New title | WBU cruiserweight champion March 31, 1995 – September 1995; Vacated | Vacant Title next held by James Toney |
| Vacant Title last held by Robert Daniels | IBO cruiserweight champion April 10, 1999 – April 8, 2000 | Succeeded by Uriah Grant |
Major world boxing titles
| Preceded by José Cuevas | WBA welterweight champion August 2, 1980 – September 16, 1981 | Succeeded by Sugar Ray Leonard |
| Preceded by Wilfred Benítez | WBC light middleweight champion December 3, 1982 – October 24, 1986; Vacated | Vacant Title next held by Duane Thomas |
| Vacant Title last held by Sugar Ray Leonard | The Ring light middleweight champion December 3, 1982 – October 24, 1986; Vacated | Vacant Title next held by Oscar De La Hoya |
| Vacant Title last held by Sugar Ray Leonard | Lineal light middleweight champion June 15, 1984 – October 24, 1986; Vacated | Succeeded by Terry Norris |
| Preceded by Dennis Andries | WBC light heavyweight champion March 7, 1987 – November 27, 1987; Vacated | Vacant Title next held by Donny Lalonde |
| Vacant Title last held by Sugar Ray Leonard | WBC middleweight champion October 29, 1987 – June 6, 1988 | Succeeded by Iran Barkley |
| New title | WBO super middleweight champion November 4, 1988 – May 8, 1991; Vacated | Vacant Title next held by Chris Eubank |
| Preceded by Virgil Hill | WBA light heavyweight champion June 3, 1991 – March 20, 1992 | Succeeded by Iran Barkley |
Awards
| Previous: Sugar Ray Leonard | The Ring Fighter of the Year; 1980 | Next: Sugar Ray Leonard and Salvador Sánchez |
| Previous: Sugar Ray Leonard | BWAA Fighter of the Year; 1980 | Next: Sugar Ray Leonard |
| Previous: Matthew Saad Muhammad vs. Yaqui López II | The Ring Fight of the Year vs. Sugar Ray Leonard; 1981 | Next: Bobby Chacon vs. Rafael Limón IV |
| Previous: Marvin Hagler | The Ring Fighter of the Year; 1984 | Next: Marvin Hagler and Donald Curry |
| Previous: Marvin Hagler | BWAA Fighter of the Year; 1984 | Next: Marvin Hagler |
| Previous: José Luis Ramírez vs. Edwin Rosario II | The Ring Fight of the Year vs. Marvin Hagler; 1985 | Next: Steve Cruz vs. Barry McGuigan |
| Previous: Juan Meza vs. Jaime Garza; Round 1 | The Ring Round of the Year vs. Marvin Hagler; Round 1; 1985 | Next: Steve Cruz vs. Barry McGuigan; Round 15 |
