= Terry Dunstan =

English boxer

Personal information
- Nationality: British
- Born: 28 October 1968 (age 57) Vauxhall, London, England
- Height: 6 ft 3 in (1.91 m)
- Weight: Cruiserweight

Boxing career
- Stance: Orthodox

Boxing record
- Total fights: 28
- Wins: 24
- Win by KO: 14
- Losses: 4
- Draws: 0

Terry Dunstan (born 28 October 1968) is a British former boxer who was British and European cruiserweight champion and fought for the IBF world title.

== Career ==
Born in Vauxhall, London in 1968, Dunstan initially excelled at basketball and represented England at under-19 level. An undistinguished 17-fight amateur boxing career followed, Dunstan stating in 1997 "There was nothing to fight for. Just a trophy at the end."

He made his professional debut in November 1992. After winning his first eight fights he challenged former world champion Dennis Andries for the British cruiserweight title in May 1995; Dunstan Beat Andries on points to become British champion. In February 1996 he successfully defended the title against Andries and three months later made a second defence against John Keeton, stopping him in just 44 seconds - the second fastest stoppage in the history of British title fights. At the time, Dunstan was hotly tipped, with former sparring partner Frank Bruno rating him the best in Britain, and Charlie Magri and Barry McGuigan also rating him very highly.

After wins against Sergio Daniel Merani, Art Jimmerson, and Nigel Rafferty, Dunstan relinquished his British title and challenged Alexander Gurov for the European cruiserweight title in February 1998, knocking the Ukrainian out with his first punch connected in the first round to become European champion. This was followed a challenge for Imamu Mayfield's IBF world title in March; Mayfield stopped Dunstan in the eleventh round—Dunstan's first professional defeat.

Dunstan returned in November with a points win over Peter Oboh, and in December 1999 faced Carl Thompson for the vacant British cruiserweight title. Thompson stopped Dunstan 2 minutes and 40 seconds into the twelfth round to take the title.

Dunstan's boxing career was interrupted when he was arrested and in December 2000 sentenced to eight and a half years after admitting charges of false imprisonment, blackmail and aggravated burglary at two Slug and Lettuce pubs in central London. He served five years and 20 days before being released.

He returned to the ring in October 2008 with an easy win over journeyman Paul Bonson, and in May 2009 competed in the Prizefighter competition, losing in the final to Ovill McKenzie. After winning his next three fights he was matched with David Dolan for the vacant English cruiserweight title in December 2010. Dunstan had Dolan down in the first round and with Dolan retiring at the end of the sixth round, Dunstan became English champion.

In July 2011 Dunstan challenged for Ola Afolabi's WBO Inter-continental cruiserweight title; Afolabi stopped Dunstan in the first round. This was Dunstan's final professional fight, although he did compete in a charity tournament in February 2014, most of his time now spent training other boxers.
