= Art Jimmerson =

American martial artist (1962–2024)

- Born: Arthur Jimmerson; August 4, 1962; St. Louis, Missouri, U.S.
- Died: May 8, 2024 (aged 61)
- Other names: Zorro; One Glove
- Height: 5 ft 11 in (180 cm)
- Weight: 190 lb (86 kg; 13 st 8 lb)
- Division: Cruiserweight; Light heavyweight Super middleweight
- Style: Boxing
- Stance: Orthodox
- Fighting out of: St. Louis, Missouri

Professional boxing record
- Total: 51
- Wins: 33
- By knockout: 17
- Losses: 18
- Draws: 0
- No contests: 0

Other information
- Boxing record from BoxRec
- Mixed martial arts record from Sherdog

Arthur Jimmerson (August 4, 1962 – May 8, 2024) was an American boxer and mixed martial artist who competed at super middleweight, light heavyweight, and cruiserweight. As an amateur, Jimmerson was the 1983 National Golden Gloves Middleweight champion. He finished his boxing career in 2002, with a record of 33–18.

As a professional boxer, he fought many world champions, including Dennis Andries, Jeff Harding, Vassiliy Jirov and Orlin Norris.

== Biography ==
=== Ultimate Fighting Championship ===
In November 1993, Jimmerson competed at the very first Ultimate Fighting Championship competition, UFC 1. He came to his first match wearing only one boxing glove in order to protect his jab hand and leave free the other, which earned him the nickname of Art "One Glove" Jimmerson in the process. His opponent would be Brazilian jiu-jitsu master and eventual tournament winner Royce Gracie.

Gracie opened the fight keeping distance with Jimmerson via front kicks. He then shot a double leg takedown and achieved mount over the boxer, grapevining his legs and tying up his arms. After Gracie landed the first headbutt, Jimmerson, who had been unsuccessfully trying to get out of the hold, tapped out. It was Jimmerson's first and last MMA match, as he returned to boxing shortly after.

=== Later career ===
Jimmerson was the head boxing coach at the UFC GYM in Torrance, CA.

Jimmerson expressed an interest in fighting former YouTube sensation and UFC fighter Kimbo Slice in a boxing match.

=== Death ===
Jimmerson died on May 8, 2024, at the age of 60.

== Professional boxing record ==
33 Wins (17 knockouts, 16 decisions), 18 Losses (12 knockouts, 6 decisions)
Result	Record	Opponent	Type	Round	Date	Location	Notes
Loss	33-18	(United States) Rydell Booker	TKO	2	23/11/2002	Danville, Virginia, U.S.	
Loss	33-17	(United States) Mike Rodgers	TKO	3	12/10/2002	Nashville, Tennessee, U.S.	WBF Cruiserweight/Super Cruiserweight Titles.
Loss	33-16	(United States) Rich LaMontagne	TKO	1	28/06/2002	Boston, Massachusetts, U.S.	EBA Cruiserweight Title.
Loss	33-15	(United States) Mike Rodgers	DQ	3	11/08/2001	Little Rock, Arkansas, U.S.	
Loss	33-14	(United States) Arthur Williams	KO	1	09/01/1999	Pensacola, Florida, U.S.	Jimmerson knocked out at 0:54 of the first round.
Loss	33-13	(United States) Adolpho Washington	TKO	3	27/11/1998	Gary, Indiana, U.S.	Referee stopped the bout at 1:33 of the third round.
Loss	33-12	(Canada) Dale Brown	KO	3	03/04/1998	Montreal, Quebec, Canada	NABF Cruiserweight Title. Jimmerson knocked out at 1:10 of the third round.
Loss	33-11	(Kazakhstan) Vassiliy Jirov	TKO	2	Dec 6, 1997	Atlantic City, New Jersey, U.S.	Referee stopped the bout at 2:55 of the second round.
Loss	33-10	(United Kingdom) Terry Dunstan	TKO	1	12/04/1997	(United Kingdom) Sheffield, England, U.K.	
Win	33-9	(United States) Earl Abernathy	UD	6	23/09/1996	St. Louis, Missouri, U.S.	
Loss	32-9	(Germany) Torsten May	KO	5	09/09/1995	Bielefeld, Germany	
Loss	32-8	(United States) Brian LaSpada	DQ	11	17/06/1995	Las Vegas, Nevada, U.S.	NABF Cruiserweight Title. Jimmerson disqualified at 2:31 of the 11th round for low blows.
Win	32-7	(United States) Jerry Halstead	SD	8	01/05/1995	St. Louis, Missouri, U.S.	
Loss	31-7	(United States) Holsey Ellingburg	PTS	8	29/10/1994	St. Louis, Missouri, U.S.	
Win	31-6	(United States) Anthony Peat	KO	3	10/10/1994	St. Louis, Missouri, U.S.	
Win	30-6	(United States) Lopez McGee	PTS	6	01/04/1994	St. Louis, Missouri, U.S.	
Loss	29-6	(United States) Orlin Norris	TKO	4	09/01/1994	Del Mar, California, U.S.	
Win	29-5	(United States) Rick Myers	TKO	4	27/09/1993	St. Louis, Missouri, U.S.	
Win	28-5	(United States) Tim Fitzgerald	TKO	1	06/05/1993	St. Louis, Missouri, U.S.	
Win	27-5	(United States) Mike Smith	KO	2	15/03/1993	Jefferson City, Missouri, U.S.	
Win	26-5	(United States) Lopez McGee	TKO	3	08/03/1993	St. Louis, Missouri, U.S.	
Win	25-5	(United States) Larry Prather	UD	10	11/01/1993	St. Louis, Missouri, U.S.	
Win	24-5	(United States) Tim Johnson	PTS	10	30/11/1992	St. Louis, Missouri, U.S.	
Win	23-5	(United States) John Collier	PTS	6	29/08/1992	St. Louis, Missouri, U.S.	
Win	22-5	(United States) Lopez McGee	UD	8	17/08/1992	St. Louis, Missouri, U.S.	
Win	21-5	(United States) Sylvester White	PTS	8	22/06/1992	Bridgeton, Missouri, U.S.	
Win	20-5	(United States) Tim Knight	TKO	6	13/04/1992	St. Louis, Missouri, U.S.	
Win	19-5	(United States) Phil Brown	KO	3	27/03/1992	St. Louis, Missouri, U.S.	
Win	18-5	(United States) Jordan Keepers	TKO	1	20/03/1992	St. Louis, Missouri, U.S.	
Win	17-5	(United States) Tim Knight	DQ	7	17/02/1992	St. Louis, Missouri, U.S.	
Win	16-5	(United States) William Dorsett	TKO	1	06/01/1992	St. Louis, Missouri, U.S.	
Win	15-5	(United States) Paul McPeek	TKO	9	03/05/1991	St. Louis, Missouri, U.S.	IBC Americas Light Heavyweight Title.
Loss	14-5	(United States) Andrew Maynard	RTD	3	29/04/1990	Atlantic City, New Jersey, U.S.	NABF Light Heavyweight Title.
Win	14-4	(United States) Randy Smith	UD	10	09/03/1990	St. Louis, Missouri, U.S.	
Win	13-4	(United States) William Knorr	TKO	1	16/02/1990	St. Louis, Missouri, U.S.	
Loss	12-4	(United Kingdom) Dennis Andries	UD	10	26/10/1989	Atlantic City, New Jersey, U.S.	
Loss	12-3	(Australia) Jeff Harding	UD	10	01/03/1989	Newcastle, Australia	
Win	12-2	(United States) Bill Lee	UD	10	29/10/1988	St. Louis, Missouri, U.S.	
Win	11-2	(Nigeria) Jerry Okorodudu	UD	10	27/09/1988	St. Louis, Missouri, U.S.	
Win	10-2	(United States) Lenny LaPaglia	TKO	6	14/07/1988	(New York (state)) New York City, New York, U.S.	
Win	9-2	(United States) Lopez McGee	PTS	10	09/06/1988	St. Louis, Missouri, U.S.	
Win	8-2	(United States) Danny Thomas	PTS	6	19/05/1988	Saginaw, Michigan, U.S.	
Win	7-2	(United States) Assim Rezzaq	KO	3	05/03/1988	St. Louis, Missouri, U.S.	
Win	6-2	(United States) John Moore	SD	6	23/01/1988	St. Louis, Missouri, U.S.	
Loss	5-2	(Colombia) Manuel Murillo	TKO	7	19/06/1986	San Diego, California, U.S.	Referee stopped the bout at 1:13 of the seventh round.
Loss	5-1	(United States) David Johnson	MD	6	10/02/1986	Inglewood, California, U.S.	
Win	5-0	(United States) Danny Blake	PTS	8	02/11/1985	San Francisco, California, U.S.	
Win	4-0	(United States) John Murphy	TKO	2	27/09/1985	Phoenix, Arizona, U.S.	
Win	3-0	(United States) Robert Williams	TKO	2	18/07/1985	San Diego, California, U.S.	Referee stopped the bout at 1:17 of the second round.
Win	2-0	(Mexico) Manuel Leyva	KO	1	27/06/1985	San Diego, California, U.S.	Leyva knocked out at 2:24 of the first round.
Win	1-0	(United States) Sal Trujillo	KO	1	25/04/1985	San Diego, California, U.S.	Trujillo knocked out at 1:08 of the first round.

== Mixed martial arts record ==
Professional record breakdown
1 match	0 wins	1 loss
By knockout	0	0
By submission	0	1
By decision	0	0

Res.	Record	Opponent	Method	Event	Date	Round	Time	Location	Notes
Loss	0–1	Royce Gracie	Submission (smother choke)	UFC 1	November 12, 1993	1	2:18	Denver, Colorado, United States	UFC 1 Tournament Quarterfinal.

== See also ==
- List of mixed martial artists with professional boxing records
