= Lenny LaPaglia =

Personal information
- Other names: The Rage
- Born: Leonard Michael LaPaglia; April 8, 1960
- Died: July 6, 2013 (aged 53) Melrose Park, Illinois, U.S
- Height: 6 ft 0 in (183 cm)

Boxing career
- Weight class: Middleweight; Light heavyweight Cruiserweight
- Reach: 73 1/2 in (187 cm)
- Stance: Orthodox

Boxing record
- Total fights: 45
- Wins: 36
- Win by KO: 33
- Losses: 9

Lenny LaPaglia (April 8, 1960 - July 6, 2013), nicknamed The Rage, was an American boxer who boxed from 1980 to 1995. He was the inaugural holder of the International Boxing Organization (IBO) light heavyweight world title.

A native of Melrose Park, Illinois, outside of Chicago, LaPaglia won the 1978 Chicago Golden Gloves in the novice middleweight division. He turned pro in 1980 and won his first 19 fights by knockout before facing fellow Chicago middleweight prospect John Collins at the UIC Pavilion on March 20, 1983. The fight with Collins, which LaPaglia lost by unanimous decision, was nationally televised and is considered one of the best fights ever hosted in Chicago. Following the loss to Collins, LaPaglia suffered a career setback with back-to-back losses to lowly regarded journeyman Danny Blake, though he eventually got his career back on track.

LaPaglia would suffer losses to Doug DeWitt and Art Jimmerson later in his career. He became the inaugural world light heavyweight champion of the minor International Boxing Organization on August 20, 1993, after defeating Daryl Fromm by 5th-round technical knockout (TKO). He later fought for the vacant World Boxing Union (WBU) world cruiserweight title on March 31, 1995, losing to five-division champion Thomas Hearns by first-round TKO, retiring after the fight.
