= Dennis Andries =

Guyanese boxer

Personal information
- Nickname: The Hackney Rock
- Nationality: British
- Born: Dennis Andries; 5 November 1953 (age 72) Georgetown, Guyana
- Height: 5 ft 10 1/2 in (179 cm)
- Weight: Light heavyweight; Cruiserweight

Boxing career
- Reach: 72 1/2 in (184 cm)
- Stance: Orthodox

Boxing record
- Total fights: 65
- Wins: 49
- Win by KO: 30
- Losses: 14
- Draws: 2

Dennis Andries MBE (born 5 November 1953) is a British former professional boxer who fought at light heavyweight.

== Professional career ==
Andries turned pro in 1978 and won the WBC Light Heavyweight Title in 1986 in a decision over American JB Williamson. He defended the title once against fellow Briton Tony Sibson before losing the belt in 1987 to Thomas Hearns. In 1989 he re-captured the Vacant WBC Light Heavyweight Title with a win over American Tony Willis, but lost the title in his first defence to Jeff Harding. In 1990 he won a rematch with Harding via 7th-round KO, recapturing the title. He made two further defences before in 1991 losing the title again to Harding, via majority decision, capping their trilogy. Dennis Andries, lost a WBA Cruiserweight final eliminator via 7th-round KO to David Pearce in 1982, although the BBBoC did not sanction the Cruiserweight division in the UK. Dennis Andries retired in 1996.

== Professional boxing record ==
65 fights	49 wins	14 losses
By knockout	30	4
By decision	19	10
Draws	2	

No.	Result	Record	Opponent	Type	Round, time	Date	Location	Notes
65	Loss	49–14–2	(United Kingdom) Johnny Nelson	TKO	7	14 December 1996	(United Kingdom) Ponds Forge, Sheffield, England	BBBofC British Cruiserweight Title
64	Loss	49–13–2	(United Kingdom) Terry Dunstan	PTS	12	13 February 1996	(United Kingdom) York Hall, Bethnal Green, England	BBBofC British Cruiserweight Title
63	Win	49–12–2	(United States) Artis Pendergrass	PTS	8	28 October 1995	(United Kingdom) Whitchurch Sports Centre, Bristol, England	
62	Loss	48–12–2	(United Kingdom) Terry Dunstan	PTS	12	13 May 1995	(United Kingdom) Kelvin Hall, Glasgow, Scotland	BBBofC British Cruiserweight Title
61	Win	48–11–2	(United States) Mike Peak	PTS	10	4 March 1995	(United Kingdom) Forum, Livingston, Scotland	
60	Win	47–11–2	(United Kingdom) Denzil Browne	TKO	11	21 January 1995	(United Kingdom) Scottish Exhibition Centre, Glasgow, Scotland	BBBofC British Cruiserweight Title
59	Win	46–11–2	(United States) Sylvester White	TKO	5	1 October 1994	Arena de Cosets, Carpentras, France	
58	Loss	45–11–2	(Poland) Przemysław Saleta	UD	12	23 March 1994	(United Kingdom) Star Leisure Centre, Cardiff, Wales	WBC International Cruiserweight Title
57	Win	45–10–2	(United States) Mike Peak	PTS	10	26 February 1994	(United Kingdom) Earls Court Exhibition Centre, Kensington, England	
56	Win	44–10–2	(United Kingdom) Crawford Ashley	TKO	4	29 January 1994	(United Kingdom) National Ice Rink, Cardiff, Wales	
55	Win	43–10–2	(United States) Willie Jake	TKO	6	31 March 1993	(United Kingdom) Broadway Theatre, Barking, England	
54	Win	42–10–2	(United States) David Sewell	PTS	10	27 February 1993	(United Kingdom) Goresbrook Leisure Centre, Dagenham, England	
53	Loss	41–10–2	(France) Akim Tafer	MD	12	27 February 1992	Salle de la Bulle, Beausoleil, France	EBU Cruiserweight Title
52	Win	41–9–2	(United States) Paul Madison	TKO	9	11 December 1991	(United States) Duluth, Minnesota, U.S.	
51	Win	40–9–2	(Barbados) Edward Neblett	KO	4	15 November 1991	(United States) Sun Dome, Tampa, Florida, U.S.	
50	Loss	39–9–2	(Australia) Jeff Harding	MD	12	11 September 1991	(United Kingdom) Hammersmith Apollo, Hammersmith, England	Lost WBC light heavyweight title
49	Win	39–8–2	(Australia) Guy Waters	UD	12	19 January 1991	Memorial Drive Tennis Centre, Adelaide, Australia	Retained WBC light heavyweight title
48	Win	38–8–2	(Argentina) Sergio Daniel Merani	TKO	4	10 October 1990	(United Kingdom) Royal Albert Hall, Kensington, England	Retained WBC light heavyweight title
47	Win	37–8–2	(Australia) Jeff Harding	KO	7	28 July 1990	Rod Laver Arena, Melbourne, Australia	Won WBC light heavyweight title
46	Win	36–8–2	(Brazil) Clarismundo Aparecido Silva	TKO	7	20 January 1990	(United States) The Palace, Auburn Hills, Michigan, U.S.	
45	Win	35–8–2	(United States) Art Jimmerson	UD	10	26 October 1989	(United States) Resorts Casino Hotel, Atlantic City, New Jersey, U.S.	
44	Loss	34–8–2	(Australia) Jeff Harding	TKO	12	24 June 1989	(United States) Trump Plaza Hotel and Casino, Atlantic City, New Jersey, U.S.	Lost WBC light heavyweight title
43	Win	34–7–2	(United States) Tony Willis	TKO	5	21 February 1989	(United States) Convention Center, Tucson, Arizona, U.S.	Won vacant WBC light heavyweight title
42	Win	33–7–2	(United States) Paul Madison	TKO	4	17 October 1988	(United States) Convention Center, Tucson, Arizona, U.S.	
41	Win	32–7–2	(United States) Tony Harrison	TKO	8	10 September 1988	(United States) The Palace, Auburn Hills, Michigan, U.S.	
40	Win	31–7–2	(United States) Bobby Czyz	MD	10	22 May 1988	(United States) Ballys Park Place Hotel Casino, Atlantic City, New Jersey, U.S.	
39	Win	30–7–2	(United States) Jamie Howe	PTS	10	20 February 1988	(United States) Cobo Arena, Detroit, Michigan, U.S.	
38	Win	29–7–2	(United States) Robert Folley	PTS	10	6 October 1987	(United States) Studio West, Phoenix, Arizona, U.S.	
37	Loss	28–7–2	(United States) Thomas Hearns	TKO	10	7 March 1987	(United States) Cobo Arena, Detroit, Michigan, U.S.	Lost WBC light heavyweight title
36	Win	28–6–2	(United Kingdom) Tony Sibson	TKO	9	10 September 1986	(United Kingdom) Alexandra Pavilion, Muswell Hill, England	Retained WBC light heavyweight title
35	Win	27–6–2	(United States) J. B. Williamson	SD	12	30 April 1986	(United Kingdom) Picketts Lock Stadium, Edmonton, England	Won WBC light heavyweight title
34	Win	26–6–2	(United Kingdom) Keith Bristol	TKO	6	13 February 1986	(United Kingdom) Crest Hotel, Longford, England	
33	Draw	25–6–2	(Netherlands) Alex Blanchard	PTS	12	11 December 1985	(United Kingdom) West Hotel, Fulham, England	
32	Win	25–6–1	(United States) Marcus Dorsey	KO	3	6 June 1985	(United States) Municipal Auditorium, Lafayette, Louisiana, U.S.	
31	Win	24–6–1	(United States) Tim Broady	TKO	5	25 May 1985	(United States) Atlantis Hotel & Casino, Atlantic City, New Jersey, U.S.	
30	Win	23–6–1	(United States) Jeff Meachem	TKO	4	7 May 1985	(United States) Landmark Hotel, Metairie, Louisiana, U.S.	
29	Win	22–6–1	(Belgium) Jose Seys	TKO	3	23 March 1985	(United Kingdom) Lyceum Ballroom, The Strand, England	
28	Win	21–6–1	(Jamaica) Devon Bailey	KO	12	10 October 1984	(United Kingdom) Britannia Leisure Centre, Shoreditch, England	BBBofC British Light Heavyweight Title
27	Win	20–6–1	(Curaçao) Tom Collins	PTS	12	6 April 1984	(United Kingdom) Town Hall, Watford, England	BBBofC British Light Heavyweight Title
26	Win	19–6–1	(Curaçao) Tom Collins	PTS	12	26 January 1984	(United Kingdom) Lyceum Ballroom, The Strand, England	BBBofC British Light Heavyweight Title
25	Win	18–6–1	(United Kingdom) Keith Bristol	KO	4	22 September 1983	(United Kingdom) Lyceum Ballroom, The Strand, England	BBBofC Southern Area Light Heavyweight Title.
24	Win	17–6–1	(United Kingdom) Chris Lawson	KO	4	19 May 1983	(United Kingdom) Porchester Hall, Queensway, England	
23	Win	16–6–1	(United Kingdom) Karl Canwell	KO	4	28 February 1983	(United Kingdom) Lyceum Ballroom, The Strand, England	BBBofC Southern Area Light Heavyweight Title.
22	Win	15–6–1	(United Kingdom) Keith Bristol	PTS	10	13 August 1982	(United Kingdom) Lyceum Ballroom, The Strand, England	BBBofC Southern Area Light Heavyweight Title.
21	Loss	14–6–1	(Curaçao) Tom Collins	PTS	15	15 March 1982	(United Kingdom) Centre Hotel, Bloomsbury, England	BBBofC British Light Heavyweight Title
20	Win	14–5–1	(United Kingdom) Alex Penarski	PTS	10	23 November 1981	(United Kingdom) Aquarius Night Club, Chesterfield, England	
19	Loss	13–5–1	(United Kingdom) David Pearce	TKO	7	12 October 1981	(United Kingdom) Centre Hotel, Bloomsbury, England	
18	Win	13–4–1	(United Kingdom) Liam Coleman	TKO	6	16 September 1981	(United Kingdom) Adulte Ballroom, Burslem, England	
17	Win	12–4–1	(United Kingdom) Shaun Chalcraft	PTS	10	23 March 1981	(United Kingdom) World Sporting Club, Mayfair, England	BBBofC Southern Area Light Heavyweight Title
16	Win	11–4–1	(United Kingdom) Chris Lawson	TKO	8	18 June 1980	(United Kingdom) Adulte Ballroom, Burslem, England	
15	Loss	10–4–1	(Uganda) Mustafa Wasajja	PTS	8	17 April 1980	Brøndbyhallen, Brondby, Denmark	
14	Loss	10–3–1	(Jamaica) Bunny Johnson	PTS	15	27 February 1980	(United Kingdom) Adulte Ballroom, Burslem, England	BBBofC British Light Heavyweight Title
13	Win	10–2–1	(United Kingdom) Johnny Waldron	TKO	10	17 September 1979	(United Kingdom) World Sporting Club, Mayfair, England	BBBofC Southern Area Light Heavyweight Title
12	Win	9–2–1	(Jamaica) Bonny McKenzie	PTS	8	6 June 1979	(United Kingdom) Executive Sporting Club, Burslem, England	
11	Win	8–2–1	(United Kingdom) Francis Hands	TKO	8	5 April 1979	(United Kingdom) The Stadium, Liverpool, England	
10	Win	7–2–1	(Curaçao) Tom Collins	KO	6	30 January 1979	(United Kingdom) 20th Century Sporting Club, Southend, England	
9	Loss	6–2–1	(Jamaica) Bunny Johnson	PTS	10	22 January 1979	(United Kingdom) Civic Hall, Wolverhampton, England	
8	Win	6–1–1	(Curaçao) Tom Collins	PTS	8	4 December 1978	(United Kingdom) 20th Century SC, Cliffs Pavilion, Southend, England	
7	Win	5–1–1	(United Kingdom) Glen McEwan	TKO	7	22 November 1978	(United Kingdom) Top of the World Ballroom, Stoke-on-Trent, England	
6	Draw	4–1–1	(United Kingdom) Les McAteer	PTS	8	14 November 1978	(United Kingdom) Hamilton Club, Birkenhead, England	
5	Win	4–1	(United Kingdom) Neville Esteban	PTS	6	31 October 1978	(United Kingdom) Civic Hall, Barnsley, England	
4	Win	3–1	(United Kingdom) Ken Jones	PTS	6	18 September 1978	(United Kingdom) Hilton Hotel, Mayfair, England	
3	Loss	2–1	(Jamaica) Bonny McKenzie	PTS	8	20 June 1978	(United Kingdom) 20th Century SC, Cliffs Pavilion, Southend, England	
2	Win	2–0	(United Kingdom) Mark Cumber	TKO	1	1 June 1978	(United Kingdom) Centre Airport Hotel, Heathrow, England	
1	Win	1–0	(United Kingdom) Ray Pearce	KO	2	16 May 1978	(United Kingdom) Stowaway Club, Newport, Wales	

== Honours ==
Andries was appointed the MBE in the 1991 Birthday Honours.

== See also ==
- List of world light-heavyweight boxing champions
- List of British world boxing champions
- List of outright winners of the Lonsdale belt

Sporting positions
Regional boxing titles
Preceded by Tom Collins	British light heavyweight champion 26 January 1984 – 1986; Vacated	Vacant Title next held by Tom Collins
Vacant Title last held by Carl Thompson	British cruiserweight champion 21 January 1995 – 13 May 1995	Succeeded by Terry Dunstan
World boxing titles
Preceded by J. B. Williamson	WBC light heavyweight champion 30 April 1986 – 7 March 1987	Succeeded by Thomas Hearns
Vacant Title last held by Sugar Ray Leonard	WBC light heavyweight champion 21 February 1989 – 24 June 1989	Succeeded by Jeff Harding
Preceded by Jeff Harding	WBC light heavyweight champion 28 July 1990 – 11 September 1991	Succeeded by Jeff Harding
