= Bobby Czyz =

American boxer (born 1962)

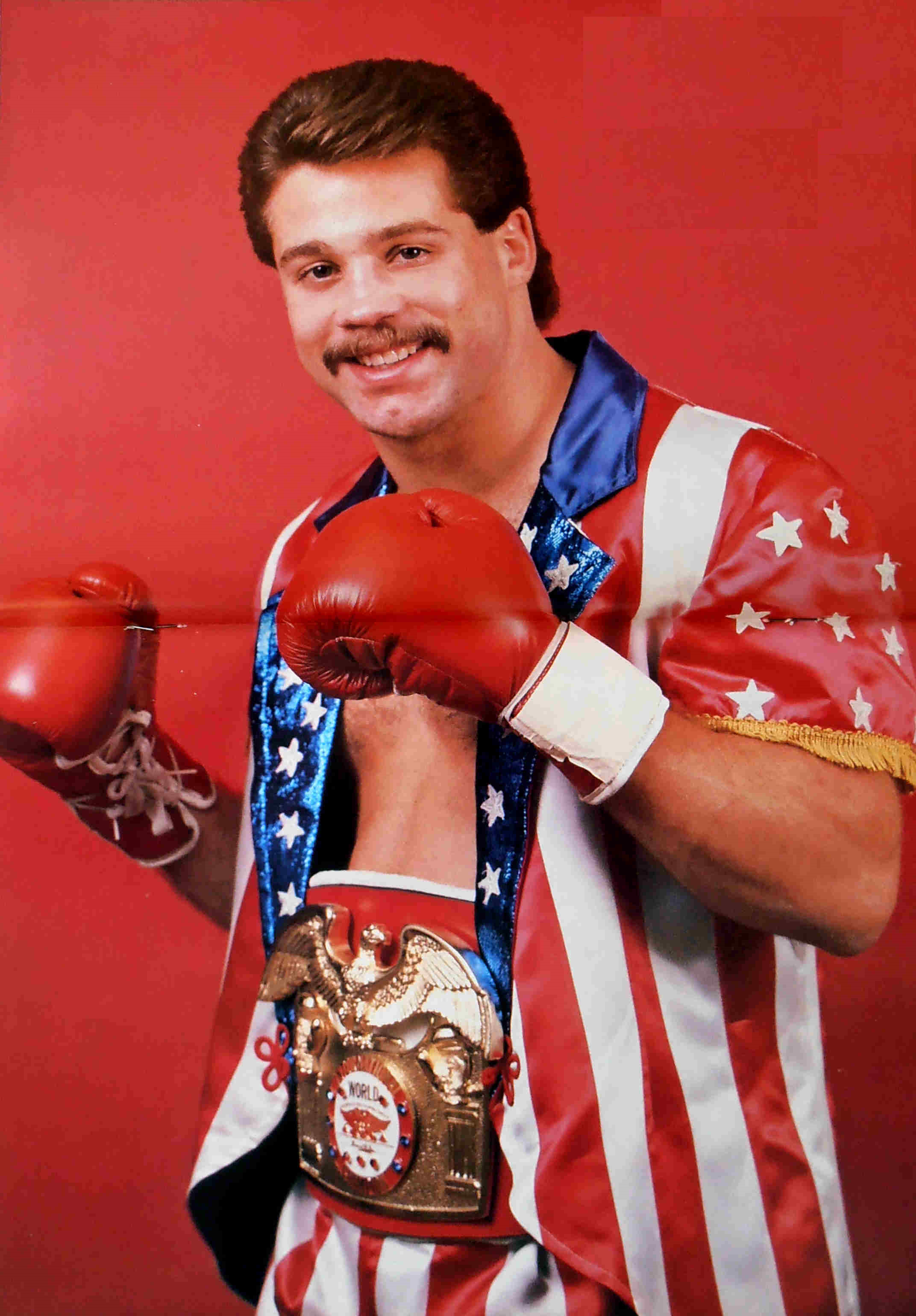
- Czyz c. 1987

Personal information
- Nicknames: Matinee Idol; Chappie
- Born: Robert Edward Czyz; February 10, 1962 (age 64) Orange, New Jersey, U.S.
- Height: 5 ft 10 in (178 cm)
- Weight: Middleweight; Light heavyweight; Cruiserweight; Heavyweight

Boxing career
- Reach: 69 1/2 in (177 cm)
- Stance: Orthodox

Boxing record
- Total fights: 52
- Wins: 44
- Win by KO: 28
- Losses: 8

Robert Edward Czyz (/ˈtʃɛz/ CHEZ; born February 10, 1962) is an American commentator and former professional boxer who competed from 1980 to 1998. He is a world champion in two weight classes, having held the International Boxing Federation (IBF) light heavyweight title from 1986 to 1987 and the World Boxing Association (WBA) cruiserweight title from 1991 to 1993.

Czyz was born in Orange, New Jersey. He grew up in Wanaque, New Jersey and attended Lakeland Regional High School. He is three quarters Italian and one quarter Polish. His younger brother is avant-garde fiction writer Vincent Czyz.

Nicknamed "the Matinee Idol", Czyz was a member of the United States amateur boxing team whose other members died aboard LOT Polish Airlines Flight 007 when it crashed in 1980. Czyz did not make the trip, as he was recovering from injuries sustained in a car accident.

== Amateur career ==
As an amateur, Czyz was doing his best to secure his spot at the U.S. Olympic team for the eventually missed 1980 Moscow Olympics. He was one of a few boxers (along with Sal Cenicola, Marvis Frazier and Tony Tucker) who survived the LOT Flight 7 crash by staying at home in the United States. He finished his amateur career having 26 fights under his belt, with a record of 24 wins, 2 losses.

== Professional career ==
Czyz had a quick start to his professional boxing career in the early 1980s, and he was soon in line for a shot against world middleweight champion Marvin Hagler. He had to start from scratch, however, after suffering a one-sided, 10-round loss at the hands of veteran Mustafa Hamsho on November 20, 1982 in a bout that was nationally televised.

Czyz went up in weight, put another string of wins together, and in September 1986, he finally found himself in a ring with an undefeated world champion, IBF light heavyweight champion Slobodan Kačar (Olympic Gold medallist of 1980). Czyz beat him in five rounds.

Czyz made three defenses: a one-round defeat of David Sears, a see-saw second-round KO of Willie Edwards, and a fifth-round TKO of Jim McDonald - before taking on 'Prince' Charles Williams in October 1987. Czyz scored an early knockdown of Williams, yet the challenger not only stayed in the fight, but also hammered shut Czyz' left eye en route to scoring a TKO victory and thus seizing the title after nine rounds of boxing.

Czyz then lost a decision to Dennis Andries in May 1988, followed by a couple of victories, in turn followed by two cracks at the world title in 1989. Czyz, despite truly good efforts on his part in both challenges, lost both of them - a 12-round decision to Virgil Hill in North Dakota for the WBA version in March, and a 10th-round TKO loss to Williams in an IBF title rematch in June.

Czyz went on to stop then-undefeated Andrew Maynard in seven rounds (the second undefeated Gold medallist he KO'd) in June 1990, then jumped up to cruiserweight. He challenged Robert Daniels for Daniels' WBA world cruiserweight championship in March 1991, and won a unanimous decision. Two defenses, against Bash Ali and Donny Lalonde, were made (both by unanimous decision) before Czyz vacated the title.

In 1994, Czyz became a television boxing analyst working alongside Steve Albert and Ferdie Pacheco whilst continuing his boxing career. The trio covered fights in many locations worldwide. In December 1994, he covered the first world title fight ever held in Ecuador as a member of Showtime's crew.

In 1996, he stepped up to the heavyweight division, but lost by knockout in five rounds to Evander Holyfield and quickly retired. Czyz fought one last time in 1998, losing by second-round TKO to South African Corrie Sanders. Czyz continued doing color commentary for Showtime, but was let go after pleading guilty to his fourth drunken-driving offense in six years after being caught speeding in Readington Township, New Jersey. Czyz's case received a lot of attention as he was a multiple repeat DUI case, and was a driver behind the NJ Assembly revisiting its legislation. Czyz, who was a Raritan Township, New Jersey resident at the time, was given a six-month license suspension for each of his three drunken driving convictions in 1998, 1999 and 2000. It was discovered that he was sentenced improperly as a first-time offender after his fourth arrest, which occurred in February 2003 in Readington Township, where he was caught driving with a blood-alcohol level of 0.14 percent. The state limit at that time was 0.10 percent.

== Professional boxing record ==
52 fights	44 wins	8 losses
By knockout	28	5
By decision	15	3
By disqualification	1	0

No.	Result	Record	Opponent	Type	Round, time	Date	Location	Notes
52	Loss	44–8	Corrie Sanders	TKO	2 (12), 1:43	12 Jun 1998	Mohegan Sun Arena, Uncasville, Connecticut	For WBU heavyweight title
51	Loss	44–7	Evander Holyfield	RTD	5 (10), 3:00	10 May 1996	Madison Square Garden, New York City, New York	
50	Win	44–6	Richard Jackson	TKO	6 (12), 1:24	5 Dec 1995	Grand Casino, Biloxi, Mississippi	Won WBU super cruiserweight title
49	Win	43–6	Jeff Williams	UD	10	22 Sep 1995	South Mountain Arena, West Orange, New Jersey	
48	Win	42–6	Tim Tomashek	TKO	5 (10), 1:24	24 Mar 1995	South Mountain Arena, West Orange, New Jersey	
47	Loss	41–6	David Izeqwire	RTD	4 (12), 3:00	4 Aug 1994	Foxwoods Resort, Mashantucket, Connecticut	For IBO cruiserweight title
46	Win	41–5	George O'Mara	UD	10	19 Feb 1994	Coliseum, Charlotte, North Carolina	
45	Win	40–5	Donny Lalonde	UD	12	8 May 1992	Riviera Hotel & Casino, Las Vegas, Nevada	Retained WBA cruiserweight title
44	Win	39–5	Bash Ali	UD	12	9 Aug 1991	Convention Hall, Atlantic City, New Jersey	Retained WBA cruiserweight title
43	Win	38–5	Robert Daniels	SD	12	8 Mar 1991	Trump Taj Mahal, Atlantic City, New Jersey	Won WBA cruiserweight title
42	Win	37–5	Horacio Rene Brandan	TKO	6 (10), 2:05	21 Sep 1990	Taj Mahal's Mark G Etess Arena, Atlantic City, New Jersey	
41	Win	36–5	Andrew Maynard	KO	7 (10), 0:42	24 Jun 1990	Convention Center, Atlantic City, New Jersey	
40	Win	35–5	Uriah Grant	UD	10	23 Mar 1990	Showboat Hotel & Casino, Atlantic City, New Jersey	
39	Loss	34–5	Charles Williams	RTD	10 (12), 3:00	25 Jun 1989	Convention Center, Atlantic City, New Jersey	For IBF light heavyweight title
38	Loss	34–4	Virgil Hill	UD	12	4 Mar 1989	Civic Center, Bismarck, North Dakota	For WBA light heavyweight title
37	Win	34–3	Mike DeVito	TKO	7 (12), 1:18	27 Dec 1988	Lee County Civic Center, Fort Myers, Florida	
36	Win	33–3	Leslie Stewart	SD	10	25 Oct 1988	Resorts International, Atlantic City, New Jersey	
35	Loss	32–3	Dennis Andries	MD	10	22 May 1988	Ballys Park Place Hotel Casino, Atlantic City, New Jersey	
34	Loss	32–2	Charles Williams	RTD	9 (12), 3:00	29 Oct 1987	Las Vegas Hilton, Outdoor Arena, Las Vegas, Nevada	Lost IBF light heavyweight title
33	Win	32–1	Jim MacDonald	TKO	6 (12), 0:37	3 May 1987	Convention Center, Atlantic City, New Jersey	Retained IBF light heavyweight title
32	Win	31–1	Willie Edwards	KO	2 (12), 2:16	21 Feb 1987	Trump Plaza Hotel, Atlantic City, New Jersey	Retained IBF light heavyweight title
31	Win	30–1	David Sears	TKO	1 (12), 1:01	26 Dec 1986	South Mountain Arena, West Orange, New Jersey	Retained IBF light heavyweight title
30	Win	29–1	Slobodan Kačar	TKO	5 (12), 1:10	6 Sep 1986	Las Vegas Hilton, Hilton Center, Las Vegas, Nevada	Won IBF light heavyweight title
29	Win	28–1	Murray Sutherland	UD	10	26 Jul 1985	Atlantis Hotel & Casino, Atlantic City, New Jersey	
28	Win	27–1	Mike Fischer	UD	10	9 May 1985	South Mountain Arena, West Orange, New Jersey	
27	Win	26–1	Tim Broady	TKO	4 (10), 1:41	18 Jan 1985	Summit, Houston, Texas	
26	Win	25–1	Marvin Mack	UD	10	23 Oct 1984	Ice World, Totowa, New Jersey	
25	Win	24–1	Mark Frazie	UD	10	30 May 1984	Atlantic City, New Jersey	
24	Win	23–1	Jimmy Baker	TKO	1 (10), 0:30	15 Feb 1984	Ice World, Totowa, New Jersey	
23	Win	22–1	Bill Medei	TKO	4 (10), 2:04	25 Oct 1983	Playboy Hotel & Casino, Atlantic City, New Jersey	
22	Win	21–1	Bert Lee	RTD	2 (10), 3:00	9 Sep 1983	Caesars Palace, Outdoor Arena, Las Vegas, Nevada	
21	Loss	20–1	Mustafa Hamsho	UD	10	20 Nov 1982	Convention Hall, Atlantic City, New Jersey	
20	Win	20–0	Chris Linson	TKO	2 (10)	25 Sep 1982	Americana Great Gorge Resort, McAfee, New Jersey	
19	Win	19–0	Manuel Melon	TKO	2 (10), 1:24	3 Jul 1982	Ice World, Totowa, New Jersey	
18	Win	18–0	Bobby Coolidge	TKO	4 (10), 3:00	23 Mar 1982	Tropicana Hotel & Casino, Atlantic City, New Jersey	
17	Win	17–0	Robbie Sims	UD	10	17 Jan 1982	Tropicana Hotel & Casino, Atlantic City, New Jersey	
16	Win	16–0	Elisha Obed	DQ	6 (10)	12 Nov 1981	Meadowlands Arena, East Rutherford, New Jersey	Obed disqualified for holding
15	Win	15–0	Dan Snyder	TKO	2 (10), 2:22	8 Nov 1981	Ice World, Totowa, New Jersey	
14	Win	14–0	Rick Noggle	TKO	7 (10), 1:59	26 Jun 1981	Sun Dome, Tampa, Florida	
13	Win	13–0	Reggie Jones	RTD	6 (10), 3:00	18 Jun 1981	Ice World, Totowa, New Jersey	Won New Jersey middleweight title
12	Win	12–0	Oscar Albarado	TKO	3 (10), 2:30	21 May 1981	Ice World, Totowa, New Jersey	
11	Win	11–0	Teddy Mann	UD	8	23 Feb 1981	Caesars Hotel & Casino, Atlantic City, New Jersey	
10	Win	10–0	Danny Long	TKO	5 (10), 2:05	8 Feb 1981	Playboy Club, McAfee, New Jersey	
9	Win	9–0	Skipper Jones	TKO	7 (10)	18 Dec 1980	Ice World, Totowa, New Jersey	
8	Win	8–0	Tommy Merola	TKO	2 (10), 2:49	16 Oct 1980	Ice World, Totowa, New Jersey	
7	Win	7–0	Johnny Davis	TKO	1 (8), 1:40	18 Sep 1980	Ice World, Totowa, New Jersey	
6	Win	6–0	Leo Ferro	UD	8	21 Aug 1980	Ice World, Totowa, New Jersey	
5	Win	5–0	Bruce Strauss	KO	4 (8)	17 Jul 1980	Ice World, Totowa, New Jersey	
4	Win	4–0	Ronald Cousins	TKO	1	19 Jun 1980	Ice World, Totowa, New Jersey	
3	Win	3–0	Dalton Swift	KO	2	22 May 1980	Ice World, Totowa, New Jersey	
2	Win	2–0	Jamal Arbubakar	PTS	4	8 May 1980	Resorts International, Atlantic City, New Jersey	
1	Win	1–0	Hank Whitmore	KO	1 (4)	24 Apr 1980	Ice World, Totowa, New Jersey	

== Titles in boxing ==
=== Major world titles ===
- IBF light heavyweight champion (175 lbs)
- WBA cruiserweight champion (200 lbs)

== Outside the ring ==
Czyz married actress and photographer Kimberly Ross (October 8, 1959 – December 19, 2006) on October 27, 1992. Their daughter, Mercedes Czyz, was born September 27, 1993. They were divorced by the time Kimberly died, after a long battle with breast cancer, aged 47.

He has since been inducted into the Polish-American Sports Hall of Fame.

Czyz is a member of Mensa, the organization for people who have scored in the highest 2% of takers in an IQ test. He even wore a shirt with "MENSA" on it while walking to the ring to fight Evander Holyfield.

Czyz was diagnosed with head and neck cancer in 2024. He has sought aggressive treatment and the cancer is in remission.

== See also ==
- List of world light-heavyweight boxing champions
- List of world cruiserweight boxing champions

Sporting positions
World boxing titles
Preceded by Slobodan Kačar	IBF Light heavyweight champion September 6, 1986 – October 29, 1987	Succeeded by Charles Williams
Preceded by Robert Daniels	WBA Cruiserweight champion March 8, 1991 – 1993; Vacated	Vacant Title next held by Orlin Norris
