= Jeff Harding (boxer) =

Australian boxer (born 1965)

Personal information
- Nickname: Hit Man
- Nationality: Australian
- Born: 5 February 1965 (age 61) Sydney, Australia
- Height: 5 ft 11 1/2 in (182 cm)
- Weight: Light heavyweight

Boxing career
- Reach: 73 in (185 cm)
- Stance: Orthodox

Boxing record
- Total fights: 25
- Wins: 23
- Win by KO: 17
- Losses: 2
Medal record
Men's Boxing
Representing Australia
Commonwealth Games
Silver medal – second place	1986 Edinburgh	Middleweight

Jeff Harding (born 5 February 1965 in Sydney) is a retired world champion boxer from Australia, known as "Hit Man".

== Early life and career ==
Harding lived in South Grafton N.S.W. Australia and was a student at South Grafton High School. He trained with Steve Cansdell in Grafton before relocating to Sydney where he was first trained by John Lewis at the Newtown Police Boys' Club from where he won his first amateur title (NSW State).

== Professional career ==
Harding a rugged come forward type fighter turned professional in 1986 and in 1989 won the WBC Light Heavyweight Title with a 12th-round TKO over Dennis Andries in only his 15th professional fight with Johnny Lewis in his corner. He had taken the fight with only three weeks notice. He defended the title twice before losing the belt via KO in 1990 in a rematch with Andries. In 1991 he recaptured the WBC Light Heavyweight Title by taking a majority decision over Andries in their third match. He defended the belt twice before losing the title in 1994 to Mike McCallum by unanimous decision. Harding retired after the bout. Harding was the 2004 Inductee for the Australian National Boxing Hall of Fame Moderns category.

== Professional boxing record ==
25 fights	23 wins	2 losses
By knockout	17	1
By decision	6	1

No.	Result	Record	Opponent	Type	Round, time	Date	Location	Notes
25	Loss	23–2	Mike McCallum	UD	12	23 Jul 1994	Bismarck Civic Center, Bismarck, North Dakota, U.S.	Lost WBC light heavyweight title
24	Win	23–1	David Vedder	UD	12	3 Dec 1992	Salle Franklin, Saint-Jean-de-Luz, France	Retained WBC light heavyweight title
23	Win	22–1	Christophe Tiozzo	TKO	8 (12)	5 Jun 1992	Palais des Sports de Marseille, Marseille, France	Retained WBC light heavyweight title
22	Win	21–1	Dennis Andries	MD	12	11 Sep 1991	Odeon Cinema, Hammersmith, U.K.	Won WBC light heavyweight title
21	Win	20–1	Bobby Jennings	TKO	7 (10), 0:57	2 Jun 1991	Conrad Jupiters Casino, Broadbeach, Queensland, Australia	
20	Win	19–1	David Vedder	UD	10	14 Dec 1990	Hordern Pavilion, Sydney, Australia	
19	Win	18–1	Stacy McSwain	KO	3 (10)	13 Oct 1990	Sydney Entertainment Centre, Sydney, Australia	
18	Loss	17–1	Dennis Andries	KO	7 (12), 2:15	28 Jul 1990	Rod Laver Arena, Melbourne, Australia	Lost WBC light heavyweight title
17	Win	17–0	Nestor Hipolito Giovannini	TKO	11 (12), 0:56	18 Mar 1990	Resorts Casino Hotel, Atlantic City, New Jersey, U.S.	Retained WBC light heavyweight title
16	Win	16–0	Tom Collins	RTD	2 (12), 3:00	24 Oct 1989	Brisbane Entertainment Centre, Boondall, Queensland, Australia	Retained WBC light heavyweight title
15	Win	15–0	Dennis Andries	TKO	12 (12), 1:23	24 Jun 1989	Atlantic City Convention Center, Atlantic City, New Jersey, U.S.	Won WBC light heavyweight title
14	Win	14–0	Nestor Hipolito Giovannini	UD	10	10 May 1989	Newcastle Basketball Stadium, Newcastle, New South Wales, Australia	
13	Win	13–0	Art Jimmerson	UD	10	1 Mar 1989	Cardiff Workers Club, Newcastle, New South Wales, Australia	
12	Win	12–0	Carlos Antunes Fonseca	KO	9 (10)	7 Dec 1988	Seagulls Rugby League Club, Tweed Heads, New South Wales, Australia	
11	Win	11–0	Charlie Dean Moore	TKO	8 (10)	5 Sep 1988	Hordern Pavilion, Sydney, Australia	
10	Win	10–0	Don Vincent Lee	RTD	8 (10), 3:00	18 Jul 1988	Hordern Pavilion, Sydney, Australia	
9	Win	9–0	Jorge Juan Salgado	TKO	5 (8)	6 Jun 1988	Hordern Pavilion, Sydney, Australia	
8	Win	8–0	Doug Sam	TKO	5 (12)	28 Apr 1988	Rosehill Gardens Racecourse, Sydney, Australia	Won OPBF light heavyweight title
7	Win	7–0	Apollo Sweet	UD	10	16 Mar 1988	Mount Pritchard Community Club, Sydney, Australia	Won vacant New South Wales cruiserweight title
6	Win	6–0	Mosese Vilia	TKO	2 (?), 1:21	11 Dec 1987	Sydney Entertainment Centre, Sydney, Australia	
5	Win	5–0	Luka Joel	KO	2 (10)	25 Sep 1987	Cronulla Workingmen's Club, Sydney, Australia	Won Australasian light heavyweight title
4	Win	4–0	Johnny Taupau Sr.	TKO	2 (10)	24 Jul 1987	Sydney Entertainment Centre, Sydney, Australia	
3	Win	3–0	Materati Valu	KO	2 (10)	19 Jun 1987	Blacktown RSL Club, Sydney, Australia	
2	Win	2–0	Emmanuel Otti	TKO	5 (10)	5 Feb 1987	Hordern Pavilion, Sydney, Australia	
1	Win	1–0	Tommy Roberts	KO	4 (10)	7 Nov 1986	Marrickville RSL Club, Sydney, Australia	

== See also ==
- Rugby league team he follows is the Canterbury Bankstown bulldogs
- List of Commonwealth Games medallists in boxing
- List of world light-heavyweight boxing champions
- Australian National Boxing Hall of Fame

Sporting positions
Regional boxing titles
Preceded by Doug Sam	OPBF light heavyweight champion 28 April 1988 – 24 June 1989; Won world title	Vacant Title next held by Byung Yung Min
World boxing titles
Preceded by Dennis Andries	WBC light heavyweight champion 24 June 1989 – 28 July 1990	Succeeded by Dennis Andries
Preceded by Dennis Andries	WBC light heavyweight champion 11 September 1991 – 23 July 1994	Succeeded by Mike McCallum
