= Jorge Amparo =

Dominican Republic boxer (born 1954)

Personal information
- Nationality: Dominican
- Born: 4 March 1954 (age 72) Guaymate, Dominican Republic

Sport
- Sport: Boxing
Medal record
Men's amateur boxing
Representing Dominican Republic
Pan American Games
Bronze medal – third place	1979 San Juan	Light middleweight

Jorge Amparo (born 4 March 1954) is a Dominican Republic boxer. He competed in the men's light middleweight event at the 1976 Summer Olympics.
