= Jeff Stoudemire =

American boxer (born 1957)

Jeff Stoudemire (born September 24, 1957 in Cleveland, Ohio) is an American former professional boxer.

== Amateur career ==
Stoudemire was a standout as an amateur, becoming the 1978 National Golden Gloves Welterweight champion and 1979 National AAU Light middleweight champion.

== Professional career ==
Nicknamed SHOWTIME, Stoudemire was well on his way to becoming a championship contender, before suddenly retiring. He turned pro in 1980 and lost his first bout to Mike Sacchetti.Saccehtti went on to fight four world champions. After going three years undefeated, he lost his second bout in 1983, the year his first and only son JaJa Stoudemire was born. SHOWTIME lost his last bout in 1984 and then decided to retire from the sport. When asked why, SHOWTIME stated that he wanted to spend more time with his family and church.
