= Trump World's Fair =

Former hotel and casino in Atlantic City, New Jersey

Coordinates: 39.3537°N 74.4404°W

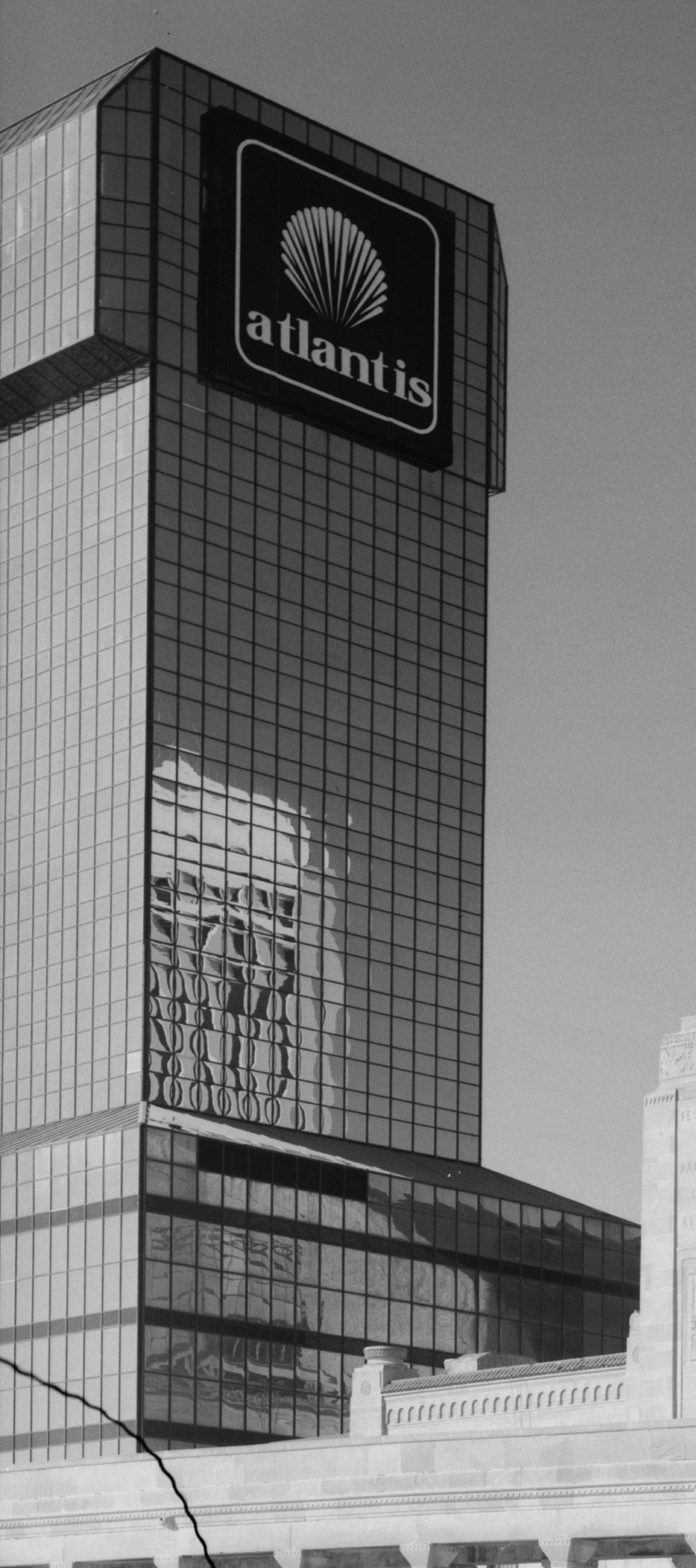
- As the Atlantis Hotel and Casino, c. 1987
- Interactive map of Trump World's Fair
- Location: Florida Avenue & Boardwalk Atlantic City, New Jersey 08401
- Opened: April 14, 1981
- Closed: October 3, 1999; 27 years ago
- Theme: New York City and World's fair
- No. of rooms: 500
- Casino type: Land-based
- Owner: Trump Hotels and Casino Resorts
- Previous names: Playboy Hotel and Casino (1981–1984); Atlantis Hotel and Casino (1984–1989); Trump Regency (1989–1996)
- Renovated in: 1996

Trump World's Fair at Trump Plaza was a hotel and casino in Atlantic City, New Jersey, that occupied 280 feet (85.3 m) of the Atlantic City boardwalk and was 21 floors in height. It had 500 guest rooms. It opened on April 14, 1981, as the Playboy Hotel and Casino, then changed its name in 1984 to Atlantis Hotel and Casino.

== History ==
=== Playboy: 1981–84 ===
The hotel/casino project was initiated by Playboy Enterprises, which later took on Elsinore Corporation (owner of the Four Queens Hotel and Casino in Las Vegas) as a partner in order to obtain financing. The hotel/casino originally opened with a provisional gaming license, but the licensing process was slow due to questions about the suitability of both partners. The New Jersey Casino Control Commission finally granted a permanent gaming license to Elsinore Corporation, but not to Playboy Enterprises (due to concerns about the company's London casino operations, as well as payments made by the company to New York officials in the early 1960s in order to get a liquor license for its New York Playboy Club). Playboy agreed to sell its share of the hotel/casino to Elsinore and the property's name was changed. Boxing matches were held at the casino.

=== Atlantis: 1984–89 ===
The complex was split into two sections divided by Florida Avenue. The main building housed the multi-level casino, 500-room hotel tower and restaurants. The other building, accessible by a skybridge from the second floor, housed the 800-seat Cabaret and shops. The Cabaret featured acts such as Bobby Vinton, David Copperfield, Vic Damone, Lola Falana and The Captain & Tennille. The 5th Dimension was the last act to perform in the Cabaret, finishing out its engagement after gaming operations had ceased on the casino floor.

In 1985, the casino filed for bankruptcy and then continued to struggle financially. In April 1989, the state rejected renewal of its gaming license, and then placed the Atlantis into conservatorship. The casino closed on May 22, 1989, though the hotel continued to operate. Donald Trump purchased the Atlantis in June 1989 for $63 million, and renamed it as the Trump Regency.

=== Trump Regency: 1989–96 ===
In July 1992, ownership was transferred to the property's mortgage holder, Chemical Bank. Trump bought back the Regency for $60 million in June 1995.

=== Trump's World Fair: 1996–99 ===
On May 15, 1996, Trump reopened the casino after investing $48 million in a renovation, and the property changed its name again to the Trump World's Fair at Trump Plaza Hotel and Casino. However, after only three years, the hotel and casino were closed permanently on October 3, 1999, and the building was demolished in 2000. The land was sold at auction to Bruce Toll of Toll Brothers.
