= Chuck Hull (ring announcer) =

American boxing ring announcer, sportscaster and actor

Charles "Chuck" Hull (March 1, 1924-some sources say 1923-February 15, 2000) was an American ring announcer and sportscaster who worked for more than thirty years in Las Vegas, Nevada, introducing professional boxers to live and television crowds at many non-title and major world championship boxing fights, both amateur and professional ones, many of which were held at the city's Caesar's Palace hotel. Hull was a member of the defunct World Boxing Hall of Fame (not to be confused with the more respected, International Boxing Hall of Fame or with the Women's International Boxing Hall of Fame). Hull was also a broadcaster, participating in shows shown at Las Vegas' KLAS_TV television channel.

Hull was born in Jacksonville, Illinois.

In December 2021, Hull was elected to the International Boxing Hall of Fame as a member of its class of 2022. He was inducted to the IBHOF in June 2022.

== Career ==
Hull introduced boxers in about 130 pro fight shows, according to his own account, including many Mike Tyson bouts on HBO Boxing, WBC world featherweight champion Salvador Sanchez's rematch with former champion Danny Lopez, the battle of the little giants between Sanchez and WBC world Super-Bantamweight champion Wilfredo Gomez, Marvin Hagler vs. Thomas Hearns Sugar Ray Leonard's challenge of Hagler Leonard-Hearns IJulio Cesar Chavez vs. Meldrick Taylor Aaron Pryor vs. Alexis Argüello II, Hearns versus Roberto Duran Duran's challenge for the undisputed world Middleweight title of champion Hagler, Duran's challenge of WBC world Junior Middleweight champion Wilfred Benítez, Larry Holmes vs. Gerry Cooney and many more.

== Retirement ==
Hull retired in 1995.

== Acting career ==
Hull appeared in a number of television shows and films, mostly playing himself. His credits included Tyson, a television movie about Mike Tyson, and an appearance on The Tonight Show with Jay Leno in 1996, as well as in the films Play It to the Bone, Final Impact and The Entertainers.

== See also ==
- Jimmy Lennon
- Jimmy Lennon Jr.
- Michael Buffer
