= Bob Sheridan =

American boxing and MMA commentator (1944–2023)

- Born: April 2, 1944; Boston, Massachusetts, U.S.
- Died: September 27, 2023 (aged 79)
- Other names: "Colonel" Bob Sheridan, The Voice of Boxing
- Awards: World Boxing Hall of Fame (2004), Boxing Writers' Association of America Sam Taub Award, Nevada Boxing Hall of Fame (2012)
- Sports commentary career
- Sports: Boxing, MMA
- Website: colonelbobsheridan.com

Colonel Bob Sheridan (April 2, 1944 – September 27, 2023) was an American boxing and MMA commentator. He broadcast over 10,000 fights on radio and television.

Sheridan attended the University of Miami on a baseball scholarship and briefly played for the Class-A Miami Marlins after graduating in 1966. While working as a gym teacher in Miami, Sheridan paid for air time on WDER-FM on Sunday mornings. Before the end of the year, he started calling boxing matches on WGBS. He went on to announce several of Muhammad Ali's title fights, including the Rumble in the Jungle against George Foreman and the Thrilla in Manila which saw Ali take on Joe Frazier. He anchored telecasts for Mike Tyson and Evander Holyfield's bouts. He was inducted into the World Boxing Hall of Fame in 2004. In 2007 he succeeded Lon McEachern as the main play-by-play commentator for the bodogFIGHT mixed martial arts promotion, calling fights alongside Paul Lazenby, Jeff Osborne and Royce Gracie.

== Biography ==
=== Early life ===
Sheridan was born on April 2, 1944, in Boston, Massachusetts, after his parents moved to the United States from Ireland as toddlers. His mother came from County Mayo and his father came from County Longford; both were born in 1905. Sheridan didn't come from a highly educated background. His grandfather worked as a sheet-metal worker and passed that trade onto Sheridan's father. Bob's knowledge of Irish culture was provided to him by Andrew Dougherty, his maternal grandfather. Sheridan praised his family for being "wise" and "family-orientated".

=== College and early adulthood ===
Sheridan graduated from Lexington High School and continued on to college (University of Miami) on a baseball scholarship. After graduating from college in 1966, Sheridan found a spot on a Minor League team called the Miami Marlins. By his own account, Sheridan wasn't very good at baseball and had only been brought on the team to fill a spot until a younger player arrived.

Soon after college, Bob began his amateur career as an announcer. He hosted games for the University of Miami football team and the Miami Dolphins as well. Sheridan also spent time during early adulthood traveling between Ireland and Boston while managing a cattle farm in Ireland. At the same time, Sheridan managed his broadcasting career and a part-time job as a rodeo bull rider. In 1982 Sheridan left the cattle business, along with the rodeo bull-riding business, and moved back to the States to focus on his career as an announcer.

=== Broadcasting ===
After graduating from college, Sheridan worked as a P.E. teacher in Dade County. He also paid for airtime on a local broadcasting station (WDER-FM) and, thus, began his career as a broadcaster. At the time boxing was just gaining traction in his area and Sheridan made a name for himself early. He was able to earn himself the rights to broadcast games for two notable Florida football teams; University of Miami and the Miami Dolphins. He gained recognition from promoter Chris Dundee and eventually went on to broadcast boxing bouts for Dundee's weekly cards. While working with Dundee, Sheridan got a chance to announce his first title fight which was between WBA heavyweight fighters Jerry Quarry and Jimmy Ellis in 1968.

Not long after he started calling fights for Dundee, Sheridan got a shot at sparking his career. In 1972, when he was only about 29 years old, Sheridan was offered an opportunity to work with Video Techniques broadcasting a world title fight between Frankie Otero and Ken Buchanan for the Lightweight Championship. His talent hosting that fight earned him a position with famed fight promoter Don King. A couple years later, Bob was hosting one of the most well-known fights in boxing history: The Rumble in the Jungle, the heavyweight title bout between former champion/contender Muhammad Ali and Heavyweight Champion George Foreman. The fight, in Zaire, Africa, was telecast to an audience of over 1 billion people.

Sheridan was an announcer at several notable fights throughout boxing's history, some of which include the Thrilla in Manila between Joe Frazier and Ali (which was the first heavyweight bout hosted in the Philippines), the heavyweight championship fight hosted in Japan between Mike Tyson and Buster Douglas, as well as the rematch between Mike Tyson and Evander Holyfield where Holyfield's ear was bitten off.

=== Notable fights ===
Among the many notable fighters and fights at which Sheridan was able to sit ringside as an announcer were:

- Ken Norton vs. Larry Holmes
- Sugar Ray Leonard
- Marvelous Marvin Hagler
- Thomas Hearns
- Roberto Durán
- Lennox Lewis
- Muhammad Ali
- Julio César Chávez
- Félix Trinidad
- Naseem Hamed
- Floyd Mayweather Jr.
- Bernard Hopkins
- Roy Jones
- Héctor Camacho vs. Edwin Rosario
- Wilfredo Gomez vs. Carlos Zarate
- Wilfredo Gomez vs. Guadalupe Pintor and Wilfred Benítez vs. Thomas Hearns
- Salvador Sanchez vs. Wilfredo Gomez

=== Health issues ===
From 1973, Sheridan hosted every title fight for promoter Don King. On the day of the 1997 rematch between Evander Holyfield and Mike Tyson, Sheridan experienced a heart attack. Staying dedicated to his duties, Sheridan signed himself out against the recommendation of hospital staff, and returned to the arena in order to announce the historic fight. Sheridan revisited the hospital after announcing the fight and was told that he would need quadruple bypass surgery. However, the next morning the medical team opted for two angioplasties instead.

In addition to his heart trouble in the late-1990s, by 2010 Sheridan had already had four heart attacks and twelve angioplasties. In 2010, the bank foreclosed on his house, after which Sheridan ended up in an induced coma for 30 days. Even after waking from the coma Sheridan had to deal with life as a paraplegic for some time.

=== Personal life and death ===
Sheridan was married to Anne Kelly from Carrick-on-Suir until her death.

Sheridan was the father of a son called Simon Edwards, who was born in Newham, London, England in 1980 and put up for adoption through the Catholic Children's Society. His mother was Irish hotel manager Rosemary Ruane, who died in 1985. Sheridan had a short relationship with her in Galway, Ireland. The Colonel says the relationship has been confirmed by DNA, making him the "only heir to my fortune. In laler years he was a regular visitor to Bunratty village near Shannon Airport in Ireland where he lived for a short while and made many friends locally. "

Sheridan died on September 27, 2023, at the age of 79.

== Awards and accomplishments ==
Later in his career, Sheridan took his turn as a banker after receiving an offer to work at Olympic Bank. Sheridan was thought to be a valuable associate due to his charisma and his connections with athletes and their agents. As this was Olympic Bank's primary target, Sheridan could bring in valuable customers.

- World Boxing Hall of Fame (2004)
- Boxing Writers' Association of America Sam Taub Award
- Nevada Boxing Hall of Fame (December 19, 2012)
- Voted Irish America Magazine's 50 Most Influential Irish-Americans
- Over 10,000 career broadcast TV and radio fights
- 1,000 career broadcast world title fights

== See also ==
- List of boxing announcers
