= The Battle of Champions (boxing) =

Boxing match

- Date: December 3, 1982
- Venue: Louisiana Superdome, New Orleans, Louisiana, U.S.

The Battle of Champions was a professional boxing card contested at the Louisiana Superdome on December 3, 1982.

Promoted and organized by Don King and broadcast on HBO, the card was co-headlined by two world title fights; Wilfredo Gómez vs. Lupe Pintor for Gómez's WBC super bantamweight title, and Wilfred Benítez vs. Thomas Hearns for Benítez's WBC light middleweight title.

== Gómez vs. Pintor ==
The Battle of Champions: Gómez vs. Pintor
- Title(s) on the line: WBC and The Ring Super Bantamweight titles

Tale of the tape
Boxer	Wilfredo Gómez	Lupe Pintor
Nickname	Bazooka	El Grillo de Cuajimalpa ("The Cuajimalpa Cricket")
Hometown	San Juan, Puerto Rico	Mexico City, Mexico
Purse	$625,000	$625,000
Pre-fight record	37–1–1 (37 KO)	49–5–1 (38 KO)
Age	26 years, 1 month	27 years, 7 months
Height	5 ft 5 1/2 in (166 cm)	5 ft 4 1/2 in (164 cm)
Weight	121 1/2 lb (55 kg)	121 1/2 lb (55 kg)
Style	Orthodox	Orthodox
Recognition	WBC and The Ring; Super Bantamweight Champion	WBC; Bantamweight Champion

Result
- Gómez wins via 14th-round technical knockout

=== Background ===
A fight between Gómez and Pintor had been in the making for over year. Originally, Pintor, the WBC's bantamweight champion, had expressed moving up to the super bantamweight division in the summer of 1981 after Gómez had expressed interest in moving up the featherweight division following his featherweight title fight against Salvador Sánchez. However, losing to Sánchez, but winning his next two fights as a featherweight, Gómez returned to the super bantamweight division and successfully defended his title for the first time in over a year on March 27, 1982, against Juan Meza. Pintor, meanwhile, would make the final defense of his bantamweight title against Lee Seung-hoon on June 3, 1982, after which he announced his intention to officially move up to super bantamweight in order to challenge Gómez later in the year. Gómez, prior to making another successful title defense against Juan Antonio López in June 1982, would indicate that he would likely face Pintor within his next two fights. To get ready for Gómez, Pintor would make his super bantamweight debut in a tune-up bout against Jorge Luján, earning a 10-round unanimous decision victory. Two weeks later, King would announce The Battle of Champions card featuring the anticipated Gómez–Pintor fight.

=== Fight details ===
In what would prove to be a brutal, back-and-forth affair, Gómez would earn a 14th-round technical knockout victory.

The third round would prove to be the most memorable. Gómez aggressively attacked Pintor as soon as the bell rang, backing him up into the ropes right-left combination. For a full minute Gómez would have Pintor pinned to the ropes where he landed punches almost at will while Pintor desperately tried to counter-punch and escape Gómez's attack. However, an errant low blow followed by a warning from referee Arthur Mercante Sr. got Pintor off the ropes and on the attack himself. For the remainder of the round, Pintor was the aggressor, backing Gómez into the ropes on occasion and landing heavy blows to Gómez's head, though Gómez would still effectively counter-punch and the round ended with both fighters trading blows in the center of the ring. The action-packed round would be named The Ring magazine's Round of the Year for 1982.

The fight would remain close, with Gómez holding a narrow lead on two of the judge's scorecards, with Pintor winning the third going into the later rounds, however both of Gómez's eyes were badly bruised and swollen, which would lead the ringside physician to examine his injuries twice, though he was cleared both times. Gómez, though cleared, had trouble seeing out of his injured eyes and would also seem to tire during the later rounds, leading to Pintor gaining momentum. However, fighting on pure instinct, Gómez would send Pintor down with a left hook to the body. Pintor answered Mercante's 10-count, but was badly hurt as Gómez rushed in and quickly backed Pintor into the ropes and dropped him again with a left hook to the head. Mercante would immediately stop the fight, giving Gómez the technical knockout victory at 2:44 of the round.

== Benítez vs. Hearns ==
The Battle of Champions: Benítez vs. Hearns
- Title(s) on the line: WBC and The Ring Super Welterweight title

Tale of the tape
Boxer	Wilfred Benítez	Thomas Hearns
Nickname	El Radar ("The Radar")	The Hitman
Hometown	San Juan, Puerto Rico	Detroit, Michigan, U.S.
Purse	$1,250,000	$1,250,000
Pre-fight record	44–1–1 (26 KO)	35–1 (32 KO)
Age	24 years, 2 months	24 years, 1 month
Height	5 ft 10 in (178 cm)	6 ft 1 in (185 cm)
Weight	152 lb (69 kg)	154 lb (70 kg)
Style	Orthodox	Orthodox
Recognition	WBC; Super Welterweight Champion; The Ring; No. 1 Ranked Light Middleweight; 3-division world champion	WBC; No. 1 Ranked Super Welterweight; The Ring; No. 2 Ranked Light Middleweight

Result
- Hearns wins via majority decision (146–137, 144–139, 142–142)

=== Background ===
A fight between Wilfred Benítez and Thomas Hearns had been in the works for over two years. In November 1980 it was announced that the two fighters had been booked for a February 1981 bout in Madison Square Garden that was going to be on a blockbuster fight card billed as "This Is It" that also featured a heavyweight fight between Ken Norton and Gerry Cooney and a light heavyweight title unification bout between WBA title holder Eddie Mustafa Muhammad and WBC champion Matthew Saad Muhammad. However the fight card was cancelled two weeks before its scheduled date when promoter Harold Smith was brought up on fraud and embezzlement charges against Wells Fargo.

Following the cancellation of the "This Is It" card, Madison Square Garden officials were still interested in including the Benítez–Hearns fight on the undercard of the rescheduled Ken Norton–Gerry Cooney fight set for May 11, 1981. Despite an offer of around $700,000, Benítez and manager Jimmy Jacobs rejected the offer in favor of a less–lucrative fight that would see Benítez moving up in weight and challenging WBC light middleweight champion Maurice Hope for his third world title. Benítez would defeat Hope to become the youngest three–division world champion in boxing history at the time. He would then make two successful title defenses against Carlos Santos and Roberto Durán before an agreement was reached in October 1982 to face Hearns on December 3 of that year. The Benítez–Hearns fight was promoted by Don King with a co–main event featuring a super bantamweight championship fight between Wilfredo Gomez and Lupe Pintor in a fight card dubbed "The Battle of Champions." The massive Louisiana Superdome was chosen as the site for event and it was expected to draw a crowd of 40,000. However, ticket sales fell well short of expectations and King convinced Benítez and Hearns to take a $250,000 pay cut from their original $1.5 million purses, while Gomez and Pintor's purses of $750,000 were reduced by $125,000 in order to save the event.

=== Fight details ===
The usually aggressive Hearns, who up to that point had been widely renowned for his power with 32 of his wins coming by knockout, managed to outbox Benítez, highly regarded for his defensive abilities, to score a majority decision victory. Hearns scored one knockdown in the fight, landing a right hand in the fifth that staggered Benítez, who placed both gloves on the canvas to avoid going down, which constituted a knockdown. Benítez was officially credited with a knockdown in the ninth round, though replays showed that Hearns had eluded Benítez's punch and fell to canvas after Benítez had stepped on his foot. A right hand injury suffered in the eighth round forced Hearns to fight using only his left hand for much of the remainder of the fight, though he was still able to win by nine points on one of the judge's scorecards (146–137) and five points on another (144–139) to earn the victory.

=== Aftermath ===
Pat Putnam of Sports Illustrated would report: "It has been the lot of Thomas Hearns to be regarded solely as a cannon, something to be rolled into a ring to reduce an opponent to rubble. Last Friday night, against Wilfred Benitez in New Orleans' Superdome, Hearns finally showed that he brings more to boxing than a big bang. Fighting with only his left hand from the eighth round on after hurting the right on Benitez' head, Hearns outboxed the master boxer..."

== Fight card ==
Confirmed bouts:

Weight Class	Weight		vs.		Method	Round	Notes
Light Middleweight	154 lbs.	Thomas Hearns	def.	Wilfred Benítez (c)	MD	15/15	^{Note 1}
Super Bantamweight	122 lbs.	Wilfredo Gómez (c)	def.	Lupe Pintor	TKO	14/15	^{Note 2}
Light Heavyweight	175 lbs.	Pete McIntyre	def.	Willie Edwards (c)	TKO	5/12	^{Note 3}
Light Welterweight	140 lbs.	Jimmy Paul	def.	Pat Duran	TKO	6/10
Middleweight	160 lbs.	Doug DeWitt	def.	Larry Rayford	KO	6/10

^Note 1 For WBC Light Middleweight title
^Note 2 For WBC and The Ring Super Bantamweight titles
^Note 3 For NABF light heavyweight title

== Broadcasting ==
Country	Broadcaster
Mexico	Televisa
Philippines	MBS 4
Thailand	Channel 7 (now Channel 7HD)
United Kingdom	ITV
United States	HBO

Preceded by vs. Roberto Durán	Wilfred Benítez's bouts 3 December 1982	Succeeded by vs. Tony Cerda
Preceded by vs. Jeff McCracken	Thomas Hearns's bouts 3 December 1982	Succeeded by vs. Murray Sutherland
