= Rigoberto Riasco =

Panamanian boxer (1953–2022)

Personal information
- Nickname: El Pequeño Veneno ("The Little Poison")
- Born: Rigoberto Rodrigo Riasco Esquivel; 11 January 1953 Panama City, Panama
- Died: 29 August 2022 (aged 69) Panama City, Panama
- Height: 5 ft 7 in (170 cm)
- Weight: Super bantamweight; Featherweight

Boxing career
- Reach: 69 in (175 cm)
- Stance: Orthodox

Boxing record
- Total fights: 40
- Wins: 26
- Win by KO: 13
- Losses: 9
- Draws: 4
- No contests: 1

Rigoberto Riasco (11 January 1953 – 29 August 2022) also known as "Little Poison", was a Panamanian professional boxer who competed from 1968 to 1982. He was the Lineal and WBC Super bantamweight champion in 1976. Riasco defeated such men as Dong Kyun Yum, Leonel Hernández, Rafael Ortega, Waruinge Nakayama, Luis Ávila, Santos Luis Rivera, Seiji "Flipper" Uehara, and Sanjo Takemori.

== Professional boxing career ==
Riasco made his professional debut on 25 August 1968 with a four-round draw with Carlos Mendoza and after winning the featherweight national championship, he fought Alexis Argüello, who defeated him with a second round technical knockout.

After his defeat, he defeated previously unbeaten Luis Ávila and Puerto Rican Santos Luis Rivera, who had knocked him out in the first round in Puerto Rico. Those victories earned him the chance to fight for the newly created WBC championship belt.

On 3 April 1976, Riasco defeated Kenyan Waruinge Nakayama for the WBC and Lineal Super bantamweight titles. He made two successful defenses against Livio Nolasco and Dong Kyun Yum before losing his belt in his third defense against Japanese Royal Kobayashi in Tokyo on October 9, 1976.

He announced his retirement in 1981, but returned later. After three consecutive defeats, Riasco officially announced his retirement in 1982. He left with a record of 29 wins with 13 KOs, 9 losses, and 4 draws.

== Professional boxing record ==
40 fights	26 wins	9 losses
By knockout	13	4
By decision	13	4
By disqualification	0	1
Draws	4	
No contests	1	

No.	Result	Record	Opponent	Type	Round, time	Date	Location	Notes
40	Loss	26–9–4 (1)	Mário Miranda	KO	4 (12)	Mar 19, 1982	Plaza de Toros de Cartagena de Indias, Cartagena, Colombia	For WBC Continental Americas featherweight title
39	Loss	26–8–4 (1)	Carlos Núñez	DQ	9 (10)	Jan 16, 1982	Gimnasio Nuevo Panama, Panama City, Panama	
38	Loss	26–7–4 (1)	Il Yang	PTS	10	Dec 19, 1981	Seoul, South Korea	
37	Win	26–6–4 (1)	Jose Santana	PTS	10	Aug 15, 1981	Gimnasio Nuevo Panama, Panama City, Panama	
36	Win	25–6–4 (1)	Pascual Patterson	MD	10	Jul 25, 1981	Gimnasio Neco de la Guardia, Panama City, Panama	
35	Loss	24–6–4 (1)	Kazuo Kobayashi	KO	8 (15)	Oct 9, 1976	Kuramae Kokugikan, Tokyo, Japan	Lost WBC super-bantamweight title
34	Win	24–5–4 (1)	Yum Dong-kyun	SD	15	Aug 1, 1976	Busan Stadium, Busan, South Korea	Retained WBC super-bantamweight title Referee Rosadilla was reportedly assaulted after the bout, and forced to reverse his decision to favor Yum
33	Win	23–5–4 (1)	Livio Nolasco	TKO	10 (15)	Jun 12, 1976	Gimnasio Nuevo Panama, Panama City, Panama	Retained WBC super-bantamweight title
32	Win	22–5–4 (1)	Waruinge Nakayama	RTD	8 (15)	Apr 3, 1976	Gimnasio Nuevo Panama, Panama City, Panama	Won inaugural WBC super-bantamweight title
31	Win	21–5–4 (1)	Santos Luis Rivera	TKO	7 (10)	Nov 15, 1975	Gimnasio Nuevo Panama, Panama City, Panama	
30	Win	20–5–4 (1)	Luis Ávila	UD	12	Aug 23, 1975	Gimnasio Nuevo Panama, Panama City, Panama	Retained Panamanian featherweight title
29	Loss	19–5–4 (1)	Alexis Argüello	TKO	2 (15)	May 31, 1975	Estadio Flor de Cana, Granada, Nicaragua	For WBA & vacant The Ring featherweight titles
28	Win	19–4–4 (1)	Raul Silva	TKO	10 (10)	Mar 9, 1975	Gimnasio Orlando Winter, Panama City, Panama	
27	Win	18–4–4 (1)	Nestor Herrera	TKO	1 (?)	Feb 19, 1975	Caracas, Venezuela	
26	Win	17–4–4 (1)	Renan Marota	UD	10	Jan 25, 1975	Gimnasio Nuevo Panama, Panama City, Panama	
25	Win	16–4–4 (1)	Flipper Uehara	PTS	10	Oct 21, 1974	Korakuen Hall, Tokyo, Japan	
24	Draw	15–4–4 (1)	Sanjo Takemori	PTS	10	Jun 24, 1974	Japan	
23	Win	15–4–3 (1)	Jesus Estrada	TKO	4 (10)	May 11, 1974	Monterrey, Mexico	
22	Win	14–4–3 (1)	Kid Clay	PTS	10	Mar 2, 1974	Gimnasio Nuevo Panama, Panama City, Panama	
21	Win	13–4–3 (1)	Rafael Ortega	UD	12	Dec 15, 1973	Gimnasio Nuevo Panama, Panama City, Panama	Retained Panamanian featherweight title
20	Win	12–4–3 (1)	Vicente Blanco	TKO	6 (10)	Sep 14, 1973	Gimnasio Neco de la Guardia, Panama City, Panama	
19	Loss	11–4–3 (1)	Santos Luis Rivera	KO	1 (10)	Aug 4, 1973	Roberto Clemente Coliseum, San Juan, Puerto Rico	
18	Win	11–3–3 (1)	Leonel Hernandez	UD	10	Jun 2, 1973	Gimnasio Nuevo Panama, Panama City, Panama	
17	Win	10–3–3 (1)	Jose Angel Herrera	SD	10	May 3, 1973	Olympic Auditorium, Los Angeles, California, U.S.	
16	Win	9–3–3 (1)	Miguel Espinosa	PTS	10	Nov 18, 1972	Gimnasio Nuevo Panama, Panama City, Panama	
15	Win	8–3–3 (1)	Enrique Alonso	KO	4 (12)	Oct 28, 1972	Gimnasio Nuevo Panama, Panama City, Panama	Won vacant Panamanian featherweight title
14	Win	7–3–3 (1)	Alberto Herrera	TKO	5 (10)	Aug 18, 1972	Guayaquil, Ecuador	
13	Loss	6–3–3 (1)	Enrique Alonso	UD	10	Apr 29, 1972	Arena de Colon, Colón, Panama	
12	Loss	6–2–3 (1)	Jose Luis Meza	UD	10	Jan 30, 1971	Arena México, Mexico City, Mexico	
11	Win	6–1–3 (1)	Francisco Amaro	TKO	6 (10)	Nov 24, 1970	Jai Alai Frontón Palacio, Tijuana, Mexico	
10	Loss	5–1–3 (1)	Jorge Reyes	PTS	10	Oct 10, 1970	Mexico City, Mexico	
9	Win	5–0–3 (1)	Humberto Arboleda	TKO	3 (6)	May 24, 1970	Gimnasio Nuevo Panama, Panama City, Panama	
8	Win	4–0–3 (1)	Carlos Mendoza	KO	6 (6)	Dec 13, 1969	Arena de Colon, Colón, Panama	
7	Draw	3–0–3 (1)	Enrique Warren	PTS	6	Oct 5, 1969	Gimnasio Neco de la Guardia, Panama City, Panama	
6	NC	3–0–2 (1)	Catalino Alvarado	NC	4 (6)	Aug 10, 1969	Gimnasio Neco de la Guardia, Panama City, Panama	
5	Win	3–0–2	Manuel Jimenez	UD	4	Mar 2, 1969	Estadio Juan Demóstenes Arosemena, Panama City, Panama	
4	Draw	2–0–2	Manuel Jimenez	PTS	4	Feb 9, 1969	Gimnasio Neco de la Guardia, Panama City, Panama	
3	Win	2–0–1	Manuel Jimenez	KO	1 (4)	Dec 15, 1968	Gimnasio Neco de la Guardia, Panama City, Panama	
2	Win	1–0–1	Santos Pena	UD	4	Nov 30, 1968	Gimnasio Neco de la Guardia, Panama City, Panama	
1	Draw	0–0–1	Carlos Mendoza	PTS	4	Aug 25, 1968	Gimnasio Neco de la Guardia, Panama City, Panama	

== Death ==
Riasco died on August 22, 2022, at the age of 69.

== See also ==
- Lineal championship
- List of world super-bantamweight boxing champions

Sporting positions
Regional boxing titles
Vacant Title last held by Ernesto Marcel	Panamanian featherweight champion 28 October 1972 – 3 April 1976; Won world title	Vacant Title next held by Jose Santana
World boxing titles
Inaugural champion	WBC super-bantamweight champion 3 April 1976 – 9 October 1976	Succeeded by Royal Kobayashi
