= Larry Holmes vs. Gerry Cooney =

Boxing competition

- Date: June 11, 1982
- Venue: Caesars Palace, Paradise, Nevada, U.S.
- Title(s) on the line: WBC and The Ring Heavyweight Championship

Tale of the tape
Boxer	Larry Holmes	Gerry Cooney
Nickname	The Easton Assassin	Gentleman
Hometown	Easton, Pennsylvania, U.S.	Huntington, New York, U.S.
Purse	$10,000,000	$10,000,000
Pre-fight record	39–0 (29 KO)	25–0 (21 KO)
Age	32 years, 7 months	25 years, 9 months
Height	6 ft 3 in (191 cm)	6 ft 6 in (198 cm)
Weight	212 1/2 lb (96 kg)	225 1/2 lb (102 kg)
Style	Orthodox	Orthodox
Recognition	WBC and The Ring; Heavyweight Champion	WBC; No. 1 Ranked Heavyweight; The Ring; No. 3 Ranked Heavyweight

Result
- Holmes wins via 13th-round technical knockout

Larry Holmes vs. Gerry Cooney was a heavyweight boxing match that took place on June 11, 1982, in Las Vegas, Nevada, United States. It was one of the most highly anticipated fights of the early 1980s.

== Setup ==
Larry Holmes had been the WBC heavyweight champion since 1978, when he defeated Ken Norton by a split decision over fifteen rounds at the Caesars Palace in Las Vegas. During his career, he compiled a 48–0 record before losing a decision to Michael Spinks in his 49th bout, one short of Rocky Marciano's 49–0 mark. His opponents included Tim Witherspoon, Earnie Shavers, Mike Weaver, Trevor Berbick, Leon Spinks and Muhammad Ali.

Gerry Cooney, on the other hand, had been a professional fighter since 1977, and he was able to beat boxers such as Jimmy Young and others. The turning point of his career came when he beat Ken Norton, in May 1981, by knockout in round one at the Madison Square Garden in New York.

Anticipation over a Holmes-Cooney confrontation began to take shape in early 1981, but the fight took over a year to happen, partly because 1981 in particular was a very busy year for boxing with many other big fights, partly because Holmes was obliged to defend against Berbick, Spinks and Renaldo Snipes in that order. Cooney only had one fight in 1981, against Norton. Holmes-Cooney was originally scheduled for March 1982, but was postponed until June when Cooney injured his back in training.

By 1982, promoter Don King and manager Dennis Rappaport began one of the most massive and racially toned campaigns in boxing history to raise public interest for a fight between Holmes and Cooney. After they were both signed to fight, an intense promotional tour followed. Holmes and Cooney attended press conferences at several United States cities, Cooney was shown on the cover of Time magazine, Hollywood stars took an interest in the fight (Sylvester Stallone in particular hung out with Gerry Cooney, others, such as Woody Allen, attended the fight live) and Cooney was cast as "The Great White Hope". There had not been a White world Heavyweight champion in 22 years and Cooney would try to change that. White supremacist groups had announced they would have "agents" ready to shoot at Holmes the moment he entered the ring, and Black groups retaliated by answering that they would also have armed people on hand in case Holmes was attacked. Because of this, there were police snipers on the roofs of every major hotel surrounding the venue, once again, the Caesars Palace hotel and casino. Snipers were used because the fight was held in the hotel's parking lot; any attacker could have been easily shot by police snipers.

The fight was televised live on closed-circuit and pay-per-view television all over the world. A week after the bout, it was re-broadcast on HBO, and later still, on ABC-TV.

== The fight ==
Wilfredo Gómez knocked out Juan Antonio Lopez in ten rounds to retain his WBC super bantamweight title in the semi-final fight, and Holmes and Cooney then took center stage without any incidents. Holmes versus Cooney was refereed by Mills Lane. The announcer that night named Holmes first. Some thought that this was unprecedented; it is tradition in boxing that the challenger be named first and the champion last. The announcement was considered shameful and intensely disrespectful toward the champion Holmes by the boxing community. In fact, when Holmes had challenged Norton for the title, Norton had been introduced first. Moreover, Chuck Hull had introduced Wilfredo Gomez, the defending WBC world Super-Bantamweight champion, before introducing challenger Juan Antonio Lopez, in the bout just prior to the Holmes-Cooney main event that same evening. Nevertheless, when the boxers touched gloves before the first round began, Holmes told Cooney, "Let's have a good fight."

Holmes dropped Cooney in round two, but Cooney got up and landed a damage-causing shot to the body by the end of round four. Holmes and Cooney fought closely from rounds five to eight, trading punches in mid-ring. This was the point where Cooney's inactivity started affecting him, however, and Holmes again dropped the championship hopeful in round thirteen, which proved to be the final round. By round ten, Cooney's punches began landing low, and this caused him to fall further behind on the judges' scorecards, with referee Lane deducting three points from him for the infractions.

By round thirteen, Cooney seemed to believe that he would lose the fight and was just trying to last the fifteen round distance. He had suffered a cut on his left eye and was taking heavy punishment. Midway through the round, a Holmes cross landed flush on Cooney's left cheek, and Cooney's legs buckled. He landed against the ropes, near his corner, and Holmes moved in, intent on finishing his job. Cooney's trainer, Victor Valle, prevented him from doing so, however, by throwing a towel from Cooney's corner, signifying that they were quitting.

The fight holds the attendance record for a boxing match in Nevada with 29,214 attendees paying a total of $6,239,050.

The fight was close on the judges' scorecards at the time of the stoppage: Holmes was ahead by a score of 115–109 on judge Jerry Roth's card, but only by two points, 113–111, on each Duane Ford and Dave Morettis' cards, meaning that, technically, after round twelve was over, Cooney still had a chance of winning the fight on points by a split decision.

== Aftermath ==
Cooney had a series of problems after this fight, and he fought sporadically until 1990, when he retired for good after being knocked out in two rounds by George Foreman. Holmes, on the other hand, was Heavyweight champion until he lost his belt to Michael Spinks in 1985. He retired from boxing in 1986, but he returned for a fight against Mike Tyson in 1988. A brief retirement after the loss followed until he returned to fight at the age of 41 in 1991, where he fought 21 more matches until his final retirement in 2002.

HBO presented a documentary on the fight as part of its Legendary Nights series on memorable boxing bouts.

Holmes and Cooney have been friends and Holmes has helped Cooney with his organization, Fighters' Initiative for Support and Training (FIST), which helps former boxers to obtain other jobs and medical insurance after they retire.

Early in 2020, Holmes and Cooney discussed the idea of meeting in an exhibition fight with the sports writer Brian Niemietz of the New York Daily News, but the idea was dropped following that year's COVID-19 pandemic.

== Undercard ==
Confirmed bouts:

- Wilfredo Gomez knocked out Juan Antonio Lopez in the 10th round to retain his WBC Super Bantamweight title.
- Trevor Berbick Outpointed Greg Page in a 10-round decision.
- Larry Holmes' brother Mark Holmes stopped Billy Cage in the third round.
- James Tillis outpointed Earnie Shavers in a 10-round decision.

== Broadcasting ==
Country	Broadcaster
Mexico	Televisa
Philippines	MBS 4
United Kingdom	BBC
United States	HBO
Ireland	RTÉ

Preceded by vs. Renaldo Snipes	Larry Holmes's bouts June 11, 1982	Succeeded by vs. Randall "Tex" Cobb
Preceded by vs. Ken Norton	Gerry Cooney's bouts June 11, 1982	Succeeded by vs. Philipp Brown
