= Royal Kobayashi =

Japanese boxer (1949–2020)

Royal Kobayashi 小林 和男
Personal information
- Nickname: KO maker
- Nationality: Japanese
- Born: Kazuo Kobayashi; October 10, 1949 Shimomashiki District, Kumamoto, Japan
- Died: November 17, 2020 (aged 71) Kumamoto, Kumamoto Prefecture, Japan
- Height: 5 ft 5 1/2 in (166 cm)
- Weight: Super bantamweight; Featherweight

Boxing career
- Stance: Orthodox

Boxing record
- Total fights: 43
- Wins: 35
- Win by KO: 27
- Losses: 8

Kazuo Kobayashi (小林 和男, Kobayashi Kazuo; born October 10, 1949 – November 17, 2020), better known as Royal Kobayashi, was a Japanese boxer who competed at the 1972 Munich Olympic Games in the featherweight division, and won the WBC junior featherweight titles in 1976. He is an alumnus of the Takushoku University.

== Amateur career ==
Kobayashi who had practiced kendo until high school graduation, began boxing after admission to the Physical Training School of the Self Defense Forces. He won the All-Japan Amateur Boxing Championships in the featherweight division in 1971 and 1972.

Kobayashi represented Japan at the 1972 Summer Olympics in Munich. In the second round match against Pat Ryan, Kobayashi knocked him down thrice, badly damaged his face, and won by a 4–1 decision. Beaver County Times called the one vote against Kobayashi "the most ridiculous decision (vote) of the night". Kobayashi then knocked out Italy's Pasqualino Morbidelli in one round, before losing 1–4 to András Botos in the quarterfinals. He compiled an amateur record of 34–3 (28 KOs) before turning professional.

== Professional career ==
Since Kobayashi was an amateur boxer, he was said to be suitable for professional for his hard punches. In 1973, Kobayashi ran into Yoshinori Takahashi, who was the president of Kokusai Boxing Sports Gym (established in Tokyo in 1971) at a sports massage clinic, and was encouraged to turn professional.

Kobayashi made his professional debut under the ring name Royal Kobayashi in an eight-round bout in February 1973. His first world title shot against WBA featherweight champion Alexis Argüello ended in a fifth round knockout loss, in front of 16,000 spectators at the Kuramae Kokugikan in Tokyo in October 1975. After the fight, Kobayashi stated that he felt as if he had been beaten with a chunk of ice. In February 1976, he made an expedition to Panama, and lost on points there.

On October 9, 1976, Kobayashi moved down a weight class and dethroned Rigoberto Riasco as the WBC and lineal junior featherweight champion while being watched by 9,000 spectators at the Kuramae Kokugikan. He floored Riasco once with his left hook in the seventh round, and twice with his right hooks in the eighth round. However, he lost the title in his first defense against Dong-Kyun Yum via a majority decision at the Jangchung Gymnasium in Seoul, South Korea, on November 24 of that year. In January 1978, Kobayashi challenged Wilfredo Gómez to regain the WBC junior featherweight title in front of 10,000 spectators at the Kitakyūshū Municipal Gymnasium in Fukuoka, but was knocked out in the third round.

Kobayashi went back to the featherweight division, and captured the OPBF title in April 1978. After defending that title once, he fought against Eusebio Pedroza for the WBA featherweight title at the Korakuen Hall in January 1979. However he quit after thirteen rounds with his face swollen by a barrage of blows in the eighth round. Kobayashi defended the OPBF title seven times in total, for about two and a half years. In his eighth defense in October 1981, he suffered a first round knockout loss and retired as a boxer. His manager Takahashi later told that he realized the importance of short punches when Kobayashi lost to Pedroza and when he brought up Leopard Tamakuma to be a world champion he taught it to him thoroughly.

== Professional boxing record ==
| 43 fights | 35 wins | 8 losses |
|---|---|---|
| By knockout | 27 | 4 |
| By decision | 8 | 4 |

| No. | Result | Record | Opponent | Type | Round, time | Date | Location | Notes |
|---|---|---|---|---|---|---|---|---|
| 43 | Loss | 35–8 | Jung Han Hwang | KO | 1 (12) | 1981-10-18 | Munhwa Gymnasium, Seoul, South Korea | Lost OPBF featherweight title |
| 42 | Loss | 35–7 | Young Se Oh | UD | 12 (12) | 1981-09-06 | Munhwa Gymnasium, Seoul, South Korea | |
| 41 | Win | 35–6 | Dae Hwan Lee | PTS | 12 (12) | 1981-05-19 | Korakuen Hall, Tokyo, Japan | Retained OPBF featherweight title |
| 40 | Win | 34–6 | Koichi Matsushima | KO | 8 (12) | 1981-01-25 | Korakuen Hall, Tokyo, Japan | Retained OPBF featherweight title |
| 39 | Win | 33–6 | Dae Hwan Lee | SD | 12 (12) | 1980-08-19 | Japan | Retained OPBF featherweight title |
| 38 | Win | 32–6 | Takao Maruki | KO | 6 (12) | 1980-06-09 | Nagoya, Japan | Retained OPBF featherweight title |
| 37 | Win | 31–6 | Masa Ito | KO | 7 (10) | 1980-02-24 | City Gymnasium, Hofu, Japan | |
| 36 | Win | 30–6 | Kashi Keno | KO | 6 (10) | 1979-12-20 | Japan | |
| 35 | Win | 29–6 | Suk Tae Yun | UD | 12 (12) | 1979-10-28 | Aomori City, Japan | Retained OPBF featherweight title |
| 34 | Win | 28–6 | Chong Yun Lee | KO | 5 (10) | 1979-09-08 | Seoul, South Korea | |
| 33 | Loss | 27–6 | Hikaru Tomonari | MD | 10 (10) | 1979-07-26 | Korakuen Hall, Tokyo, Japan | |
| 32 | Win | 27–5 | Bok Soo Hwang | PTS | 12 (12) | 1979-04-27 | Kumamoto, Japan | Retained OPBF featherweight title |
| 31 | Loss | 26–5 | Eusebio Pedroza | RTD | 13 (15) | 1979-01-09 | Korakuen Hall, Tokyo, Japan | For WBA featherweight title |
| 30 | Win | 26–4 | Spider Nemoto | SD | 12 (12) | 1978-08-06 | Japan | Retained OPBF featherweight title |
| 29 | Win | 25–4 | Bok Soo Hwang | TKO | 10 (12) | 1978-04-27 | Japan | Won OPBF featherweight title |
| 28 | Loss | 24–4 | Wilfredo Gómez | KO | 3 (15) | 1978-01-19 | Municipal Gymnasium, Kitakyushu, Japan | For WBC super bantamweight title |
| 27 | Win | 24–3 | Satoshi Nakai | TKO | 1 (10) | 1977-11-03 | Japan | |
| 26 | Win | 23–3 | Shigeru Sasaki | KO | 1 (10) | 1977-05-23 | Japan | |
| 25 | Win | 22–3 | Blazer Okubo | KO | 7 (10) | 1977-02-08 | Ōtsu, Japan | |
| 24 | Loss | 21–3 | Yum Dong-kyun | MD | 15 (15) | 1976-11-24 | Jangchung Gymnasium, Seoul, South Korea | Lost WBC super bantamweight title |
| 23 | Win | 21–2 | Rigoberto Riasco | KO | 8 (15) | 1976-10-09 | Kuramae Kokugikan, Tokyo, Japan | Won WBC super bantamweight title |
| 22 | Win | 20–2 | Jaguar Sekino | TKO | 5 (10) | 1976-07-10 | Japan | |
| 21 | Loss | 19–2 | Emilio Salcedo | UD | 10 (10) | 1976-02-15 | Feria de David, David, Panama | |
| 20 | Win | 19–1 | Ushiwakamaru Harada | PTS | 10 (10) | 1975-12-21 | Japan | |
| 19 | Loss | 18–1 | Alexis Argüello | KO | 5 (15) | 1975-10-12 | Kuramae Kokugikan, Tokyo, Japan | For WBA & The Ring featherweight titles |
| 18 | Win | 18–0 | Hwa Ryong Yuh | KO | 4 (10) | 1975-06-16 | Japan | |
| 17 | Win | 17–0 | Zensuke Utagawa | KO | 2 (12) | 1975-05-09 | Korakuen Hall, Tokyo, Japan | |
| 16 | Win | 16–0 | Jun Gallego | KO | 9 (10) | 1975-04-04 | Sendai, Japan | |
| 15 | Win | 15–0 | Masanao Toyoshima | KO | 6 (10) | 1975-02-17 | Japan | |
| 14 | Win | 14–0 | Sanjo Takemori | KO | 2 (10) | 1974-12-30 | Japan | |
| 13 | Win | 13–0 | Bert Nabalatan | UD | 10 (10) | 1974-09-16 | Korakuen Hall, Tokyo, Japan | |
| 12 | Win | 12–0 | Ryu Fukita | KO | 4 (10) | 1974-09-05 | Osaka, Japan | |
| 11 | Win | 11–0 | Freddie Mensah | KO | 7 (10) | 1974-08-04 | Japan | |
| 10 | Win | 10–0 | José Medel | RTD | 6 (10) | 1974-06-09 | Korakuen Hall, Tokyo, Japan | |
| 9 | Win | 9–0 | Sung Jong Hong | KO | 3 (10) | 1974-03-17 | Japan | |
| 8 | Win | 8–0 | Hiroshi Nunose | KO | 4 (10) | 1974-02-01 | Japan | |
| 7 | Win | 7–0 | Jaguar Sekino | KO | 2 (10) | 1973-11-23 | Japan | |
| 6 | Win | 6–0 | Nam Chul Chung | KO | 5 (10) | 1973-10-19 | Japan | |
| 5 | Win | 5–0 | Katsutoshi Inuzuka | KO | 5 (10) | 1973-09-07 | Japan | |
| 4 | Win | 4–0 | Victor Dounue | KO | 7 (10) | 1973-07-21 | Kumamoto, Japan | |
| 3 | Win | 3–0 | Hiroshi Miura | KO | 2 (10) | 1973-06-15 | Japan | |
| 2 | Win | 2–0 | Gypsy Sato | KO | 2 (8) | 1973-04-27 | Japan | |
| 1 | Win | 1–0 | Baron Kumazawa | PTS | 8 (8) | 1973-02-25 | Korakuen Hall, Tokyo, Japan | |

== Later life & death ==
After retiring in 1981 with a record of 35-8 (27 KOs), Kobayashi worked as a trainer at the Yokohama Hikari Gym. He returned to his hometown of Kumamoto & worked as a security guard until his passing in 2020.

== See also ==
- Boxing in Japan
- List of Japanese boxing world champions
- List of world super-bantamweight boxing champions

== Bibliography ==
- Boxing Magazine editorial department, ed. (May 31, 2002). 日本プロボクシング史 世界タイトルマッチで見る50年 (Japan Pro Boxing History – 50 Years of World Title Bouts) (in Japanese). Tokyo, Japan: Baseball Magazine Sha Co., Ltd. pp. 172–173, 196, 198, 295. ISBN 978-4-583-03695-3.
- Takahashi, Takashi; Ashizawa, Seiichi (June 1993). ボクシング写真画報. World Boxing (in Japanese) (special issue). Tokyo, Japan: Nippon Sports Publishing Co., Ltd.: 25, 80–81.

Sporting positions
Regional boxing titles
| Preceded by Bok Soo Hwang | OPBF featherweight champion April 27, 1978 – October 18, 1981 | Succeeded by Jung Han Hwang |
World boxing titles
| Preceded by Rigoberto Riasco | WBC super bantamweight champion October 9, 1976 – November 24, 1976 | Succeeded by Yum Dong-kyun |
