= Iván Samuco =

Curaçaoan professional boxer (born 1957)

Ivan Samuco (born Ivan Conradus, February 25, 1957 and also known as Ivan Zamuco) is a former professional boxer from Curaçao, Netherlands Antilles. A practitioner also of volleyball and futsal, he is often considered one of the best athletes to be born in those islands and is inducted into the Curaçao sports museum.

During his career, Samuco won the WBC's Continental Americas Super-Featherweight title, beating the largely unheralded Aurelio Mena, 1–3 coming into their bout, by a twelve-round majority decision on December 21, 1979, in Willemstad, Curaçao.

== Bout with Wilfredo Gómez ==
Samuco had the biggest fight of his career when he confronted the 38-1-1, 38 knockout wins former WBC world Super Bantamweight champion, future International Boxing Hall of Fame member Wilfredo Gómez. Few gave Samuco, coming in with a 17-3-1, 10 knockout wins record, a chance of beating Gomez during their April 23, 1983 bout. He had been a Continental Americas Champion at some point in his career. He was, however, announced as a "former WBC champion from Curaçao" on local posters and flyers promoting the fight, implying, but not actually saying, that he had indeed been a world champion himself at some point in his career.

The fight, held at Ponce, Puerto Rico, was won by Gomez by third-round technical-knockout when the referee Ismael Quinones Falu stopped the bout after a knockdown of Ivan Samuco.

== After the Gomez loss ==
Samuco boxed four more times, including a bout after which his opponent Miguel Falero had his boxing license suspended for "fraud after a disgraceful performance"-Samuco won by fourth-round knockout-before retiring from boxing with 19 wins, 6 losses and 1 draw (tie) in 26 professional boxing matches. Later, he became a noted boxing promoter and trainer in his home country.
