= Wilfred Benítez vs. Roberto Durán =

Professional boxing match

The New Beginning
- Date: January 30, 1982
- Venue: Caesars Palace, Paradise, Nevada, U.S.
- Title(s) on the line: WBC super welterweight title

Tale of the tape
| Boxer | Wilfred Benítez | Roberto Durán |
| Nickname | El Radar | Manos de Piedra ("Hands of Stone") |
| Hometown | San Juan, Puerto Rico | Panama City, Panama Province, Panama |
| Purse | $1,400,000 | $500,000 |
| Pre-fight record | 43–1–1 (26 KO) | 76–2 (56 KO) |
| Age | 23 years, 4 months | 30 years, 7 months |
| Height | 5 ft 10 in (178 cm) | 5 ft 7 1/2 in (171 cm) |
| Weight | 152 1/4 lb (69 kg) | 152 1/2 lb (69 kg) |
| Style | Orthodox | Orthodox |
| Recognition | WBC; Super Welterweight Champion; The Ring; No. 1 Ranked Light Middleweight; 3-division world champion | WBC; No. 1 Ranked Super Welterweight; The Ring; No. 7 Ranked Light Middleweight; The Ring; No. 4 Ranked Welterweight; 2-division world champion |

Result
- Benítez wins via UD (144–141, 145–141, 143–142)

Wilfred Benítez vs. Roberto Durán, billed as The New Beginning, was a professional boxing match contested on January 30, 1982, for the WBC super welterweight title.

== Background ==
In December 1981, it was announced that the reigning WBC super welterweight champion Wilfred Benítez would defend his title the following month against former lightweight and welterweight champion Roberto Durán, who was moving up in weight in pursuit of becoming a three-division champion.

Just over a year prior to this fight, Durán had shockingly quit in his second fight against Sugar Ray Leonard, giving him only his second loss in 74 fights. The loss had damaged Durán's reputation, but he returned in August 1981 and picked up two wins against Puerto Rico's Nino Gonzalez and Italy's Luigi Minchillo before landing the title fight against Benítez with hopes that a victory would not only restore his status as one of the boxing's top fighters but lead to a third fight with Leonard. On the day the fight was announced Durán would state "I'm looking for Leonard, that's my goal" and hinted at retirement should he be unable to defeat Benítez declaring "If I lose, that's it. What more am I going to do in boxing?" The 23-year old Benítez, meanwhile, had become the youngest 3-division world champion of all time less than a year prior and was also looking for a potential fight with Leonard, who had given Benítez his only defeat in 45 fights, claiming "I'm going to beat him (Duran) and then get my chance at the only man who has a victory over me in my career."

Durán entered the fight as a sizeable underdog, with Las Vegas oddsmakers initially listing the odds 11–5 in Benítez's favor. Come the day of the fight, the odds were lowered to 8–5.

== The fight ==
Benítez controlled much of the fight and ultimately won a fairly close unanimous decision with scores of 144–141, 145–141 and 143–142. Durán got off to a good start and won the first two rounds on two of the judge's scorecards, but Benítez took control in the third, utilizing his superior defensive skills, a jab to the head and hooks to the body to earn the victory. Durán admitted that he tired as the fight went on and revealed the he had not trained hard for the fight stating "I couldn't do what I wanted. I wanted to confuse him a little more and wanted to be faster, but my body wouldn't let me." and "I was not in the gym as often as I should have been." Benítez echoed Durán's assessment of himself declaring "I thought Duran fought as well as he could but I don't think I lost more than one or two rounds. Duran has been one of the greatest fighters in history but if he hopes to continue fighting he has to take better care of himself and train harder."

== Aftermath ==
Initial plans for Benítez called for him to move up to the middleweight division to challenge Marvin Hagler for Hagler's undisputed middleweight championship in an effort to win his fourth world title in his fourth different weight class. Benítez's promoter Don King offered Hagler $3 million to accept but also offered $2 million to Thomas Hearns to instead challenge Benítez for his super welterweight title. The Hearns–Benítez fight was eventually agreed upon later in the year with Hearns defeating Benítez.

There were calls for Durán's retirement with his manager Carlos Eleta going as far to say "I think I will retire him. The time has come." and even his longtime trainer Ray Arcel doubted his body could withstand any more punishment. Durán, however, decided to continue boxing and the following year became a 3-division champion after defeating Davey Moore for the WBA super welterweight title.

== Fight card ==
Confirmed bouts:

| Weight Class | Weight | | vs. | | Method | Round | Notes |
|---|---|---|---|---|---|---|---|
| Super Welterweight | 154 lbs. | Wilfred Benítez (c) | def. | Roberto Durán | UD | 15/15 | ^{Note 1} |
| Heavyweight | 200+ lbs. | Michael Dokes | def. | Lynn Ball (c) | TKO | 1/10 | ^{Note 2} |
| Super Featherweight | 130 lbs. | Edwin Rosario | def. | Ezzard Charles Adams | KO | 3/10 |
| Featherweight | 126 lbs. | Juan Meza | def. | Antonio Guido | TKO | 9/10 |

^Note 1 For WBC Super Welterweight title
^Note 2 For NABF Heavyweight title

== Broadcasting ==
| Country | Broadcaster |
|---|---|
| Mexico | Televisa |
| Philippines | MBS 4 |
| Puerto Rico | Wapa-TV |
| United Kingdom | BBC |
| United States | HBO |

| Preceded by vs. Carlos Santos | Wilfred Benítez's bouts 30 January 1982 | Succeeded by vs. Thomas Hearns |
| Preceded by vs. Luigi Minchillo | Roberto Durán's bouts 30 January 1982 | Succeeded by vs. Kirkland Laing |
