= Pat Ryan (boxer) =

New Zealand boxer (1952–2013)

Patrick Thomas "Pat" Ryan (28 February 1952 – 15 October 2013) was a boxer from New Zealand who competed at the 1972 Summer Olympics in Munich. There he was defeated in the second round of the featherweight (-57 kg) division by Japan's Royal Kobayashi who would become a professional world champion in two weight classifications. Ryan was born in New Plymouth, New Zealand.

== 1972 Olympic results ==
Below are the results of Pat Ryan, a featherweight boxer who competed at the 1972 Munich Olympics:

- Round of 64: bye
- Round of 32: lost to Royal Kobayashi (Japan) by decision, 1-4
