= Don Elbaum =

American boxer and boxing promoter (1931–2025)

- Elbaum in 2011
- Born: Donald Elbaum; June 16, 1931; Cincinnati, Ohio, U.S.
- Died: July 27, 2025 (aged 94); Erie, Pennsylvania, U.S.
- Occupation: Boxing promoter
- Spouse: Hazel Skinner (divorced)
- Boxing career
- Nationality: United States
- Weight: Middleweight

Boxing record
- Total fights: 4
- Wins: 0
- Win by KO: 0
- Losses: 3
- Draws: 1
- No contests: 0

Donald Elbaum (June 16, 1931 – July 27, 2025) was an American boxer and boxing promoter.

== Early life and career ==
Elbaum was born in Cincinnati, Ohio, the son of Max Elbaum, a businessman, and Sally Greenstein, a concert pianist. His parents were Jewish. At the age of twelve, he began boxing at the YMCA. He served in the United States Army during the Korean War, which after his discharge, he boxed professionally from 1964 to 1969.

As a boxing promoter, Elbaum promoted prominent names in boxing including Muhammad Ali, Sugar Ray Robinson, Willie Pep, Sonny Liston, Aaron Pryor Floyd Patterson, Roberto Durán, George Foreman, Greg Sorrentino and Simon Brown.

In 2019, Elbaum was inducted into the International Boxing Hall of Fame.

== Personal life and death ==
Elbaum was married to Hazel Skinner. Their marriage ended in divorce.

Elbaum died in Erie, Pennsylvania on July 27, 2025, at the age of 94.
