= Yum Dong-kyun =

South Korean boxer (born 1950)

Dong-Kyun Yum
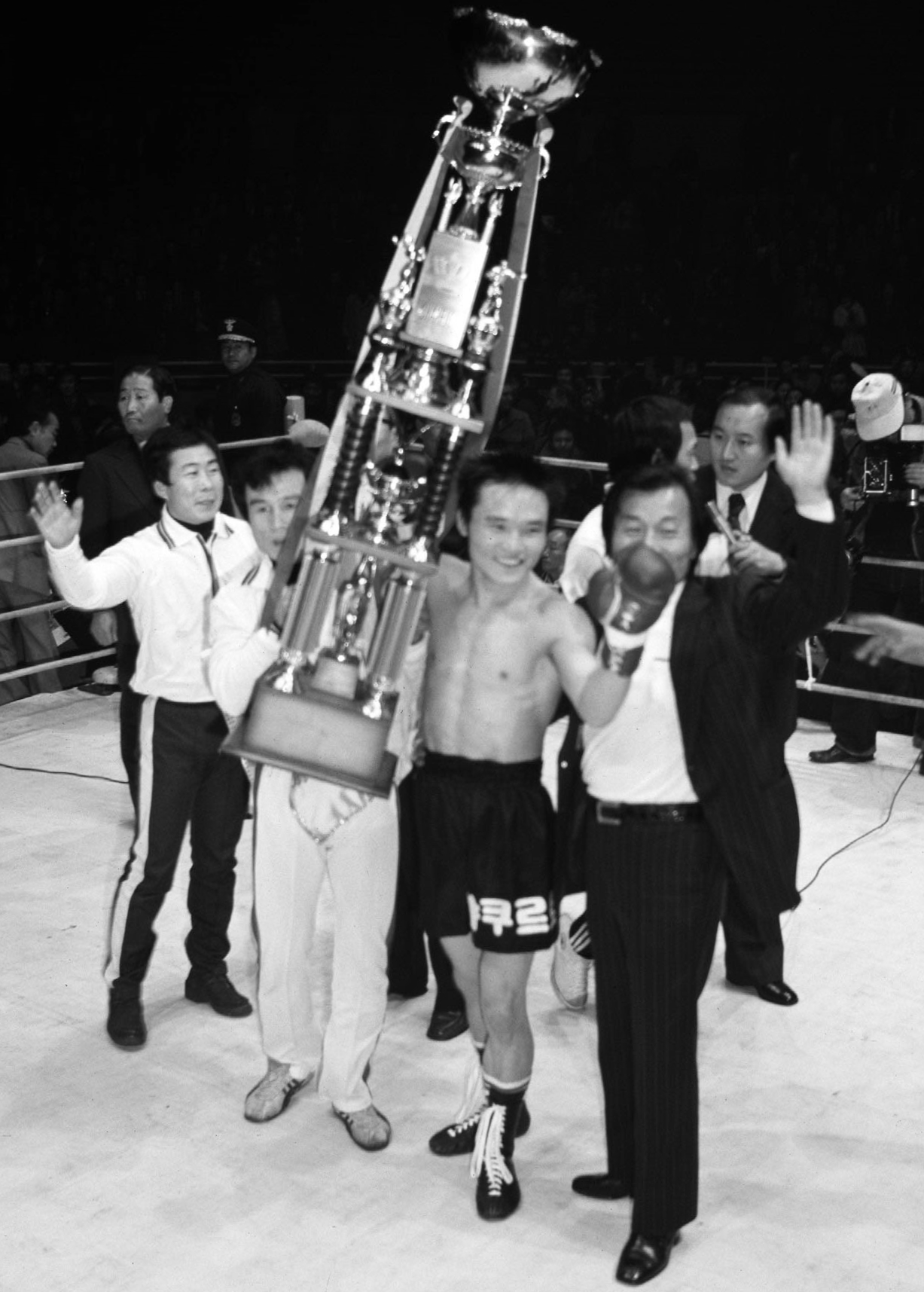
- Dong-Kyun Yum on November 24, 1976

Personal information
- Nationality: (South Korea) South Korean
- Born: Yum Dong-kyun; November 10, 1950 (age 75) Okcheon, North Chungcheong Province, South Korea
- Height: 5 ft 4.5 in (1.64 m)
- Weight: Super bantamweight

Boxing career
- Stance: Orthodox

Boxing record
- Total fights: 66
- Wins: 53
- Win by KO: 21
- Losses: 5
- Draws: 8
- No contests: 0

Dong-Kyun Yum (Korean: 염동균; Hanja: 廉東均; born November 10, 1950, in Okcheon, North Chungcheong Province) is a former professional boxer from South Korea. He is a former Lineal and WBC junior featherweight champion.

== Boxing career ==
Yum turned professional on March 7, 1970. He became the WBC and Lineal Super Bantamweight champion when he defeated Royal Kobayashi by majority decision over 15 rounds. In the following year, he successfully defended his titles against Jose Cervantes but lost to Wilfredo Gómez in his third title defense.

He retired in 1980 with an impressive record of 53 wins with 21 knockouts, 5 defeats and 8 draws.

== See also ==
- List of super bantamweight boxing champions
- List of WBA world champions

Achievements
Preceded by Royal Kobayashi	Lineal Super Bantamweight Champion; 24 November 1976 – 21 May 1977	Succeeded by Wilfredo Gómez
Preceded by Royal Kobayashi	WBC Super Bantamweight Champion; 24 November 1976 – 21 May 1977	Succeeded by Wilfredo Gómez
