= Salvador Sánchez vs. Wilfredo Gómez =

1981 professional boxing match in Nevada

The Battle of the Little Giants
- Date: August 21, 1981
- Venue: Caesars Palace, Paradise, Nevada
- Title(s) on the line: WBC Featherweight Championship

Tale of the tape
Boxer	(Mexico) Salvador Sánchez	(Puerto Rico) Wilfredo Gómez
Nickname	"Chava"	"Bazooka"
Hometown	Santiago Tianguistenco, Edomex, Mexico	Las Monjas, San Juan, Puerto Rico
Purse	$750,000	$500,000
Pre-fight record	40–1–1 (30 KO)	32–0–1 (32 KO)
Age	22 years, 6 months	24 years, 9 months
Height	5 ft 6 in (168 cm)	5 ft 5 1/2 in (166 cm)
Weight	126 lb (57 kg)	126 lb (57 kg)
Style	Orthodox	Orthodox
Recognition	WBC; Featherweight Champion	WBC; Junior Featherweight Champion

Result
- Sánchez defeated Gómez by 8th round TKO

Salvador Sánchez vs. Wilfredo Gómez, billed as The Battle of the Little Giants, was a professional boxing match contested on August 21, 1981, for the WBC featherweight championship.

== Background ==
Contested at the Caesars Palace hotel on the Las Vegas Strip, it pitted Wilfredo Gómez, a Puerto Rican who had a record of 32 wins, 0 losses, 1 draw, and all his wins by knockout, and who was the world's Jr. Featherweight champion, against the lesser known Salvador Sánchez, who hailed from Mexico with a record of 40 wins, 1 loss, 1 draw, and 30 wins by knockout. Salvador Sanchez was defending his WBC world Featherweight crown.

Gómez was the strong favorite at the betting windows due to his knockout win streak of 32 fights in a row and Sánchez's relative obscurity. During the build-up to the fight, Gomez talked often of his intention to score an early knockout over Sanchez and the betting public seemed to be in agreement.

== The fight ==
Sánchez began by surprising most fans and dropping Gómez 40 seconds into round one. Gómez got up but was battered around the ring by Sanchez for the remainder of the round, nearly going down again from an overhand right in Wilfredo's own corner. Gomez began to recover in round three and had his moments over the next three rounds, continually going forward and throwing combinations in an effort to turn the fight. However, Gómez's right eye started to swell by the third round and was nearly closed by the seventh. Sánchez started zeroing into that area and landed a number of hard punches that repeatedly rocked Gomez. In the seventh round, Gomez finally landed the combination he wanted, a right-left to the chin that partially lifted Sanchez off his feet; however, he was able to shake off the effects and move away from the corner without further trouble.

Round eight proved to be the final round. With Gómez almost blinded by his swollen eyes and the Mexican partisans shouting "Ole!" with every volley of punches, Sánchez landed a straight right hand that had Gomez teetering and badly hurt on the ropes, followed by a series of punches that almost sent Gómez off the ring. Although Gómez was able to beat the count, referee Carlos Padilla stepped in and stopped the fight, giving Sánchez an eighth-round technical knockout (TKO) win.

== Aftermath ==
Mexico hailed Sánchez as a legend. He had, in their eyes, avenged the loss that Gómez had inflicted to Carlos Zarate some years before. He became recognized by many Mexicans and international fans as the nation's greatest, but that moment of glory was short lived. Almost a year after his fight with Gómez, on August 12, 1982, Sánchez was killed in a car accident. Soon, Julio César Chávez would replace him as Mexico's favorite fighter.

In Puerto Rico, it was a moment to mourn for most boxing fans. Many businesses and stores were closed the day after, as Gómez was a national hero to most Puerto Ricans, and he was seen by many as invincible. It took, in the eyes of Puerto Rican boxing fans, 18 years to really avenge Gómez's defeat against Sánchez, and that was when Félix Trinidad beat Oscar De La Hoya in 1999. Gómez went into a depression, but he roared back the next year and posted world title wins against many other boxers from there on until he retired in 1989. Among the fighters he would beat later were Lupe Pintor (who also is Mexican) at the Carnival of Champions, and Juan Laporte. Gómez joined the exclusive group of fighters to win titles in three different boxing divisions.

It could be said that Sánchez, in between the moment he beat Gómez and the moment he died almost a year later, warmed himself to the hearts of many Puerto Ricans. He granted interviews to many Puerto Rican television news shows, and was known for speaking well about Puerto Rico and its people. When Sánchez died, news of his death were heard across Latin America, and many people both in Mexico and Puerto Rico were saddened by his passing. His funeral was shown live in Mexico, and in Puerto Rico, a tribute show to him was aired by WAPA-TV five days after his death, featuring his past interviews with that network's sportscasters, his story, and clips of his fights.

Gómez himself also became a dear person to the people of Mexico after this fight. Although they knew him as the Mexican beater because of the many other fights he won against Mexican boxers, Gómez showed no ill feelings towards the people of Mexico by offering Sánchez flowers after Sánchez died, and becoming a frequent visitor to the Sánchez family thereafter. On Sánchez's small town, there is always a festival to commemorate Sánchez's memory every year, around the week of August 12. Gómez has been named Grand Marischal of that festival three times already, and has been a guest of honor many of the times it has been celebrated after Sánchez's passing.

There had always been talks of a rematch between the two before Sánchez died. What would have happened in a rematch will never be known, but the fact is that both Gómez and Sánchez are now together in a place far different from a boxing ring: They are both in the International Boxing Hall Of Fame.

== Undercard ==
Confirmed bouts:

== Broadcasting ==
The fight was broadcast on closed-circuit television to all of the United States and through many Latin American countries. In Thailand, it was broadcast on Channel 7 (present-day Channel 7HD).

Preceded by vs. Nicky Perez	Salvador Sánchez's bouts 21 August 1981	Succeeded by vs. Pat Cowdell
Preceded by vs. Raúl Silva	Wilfredo Gómez's bouts 21 August 1981	Succeeded by vs. José González
