= Wilfredo Gómez =

Puerto Rican boxer (1956–2026)

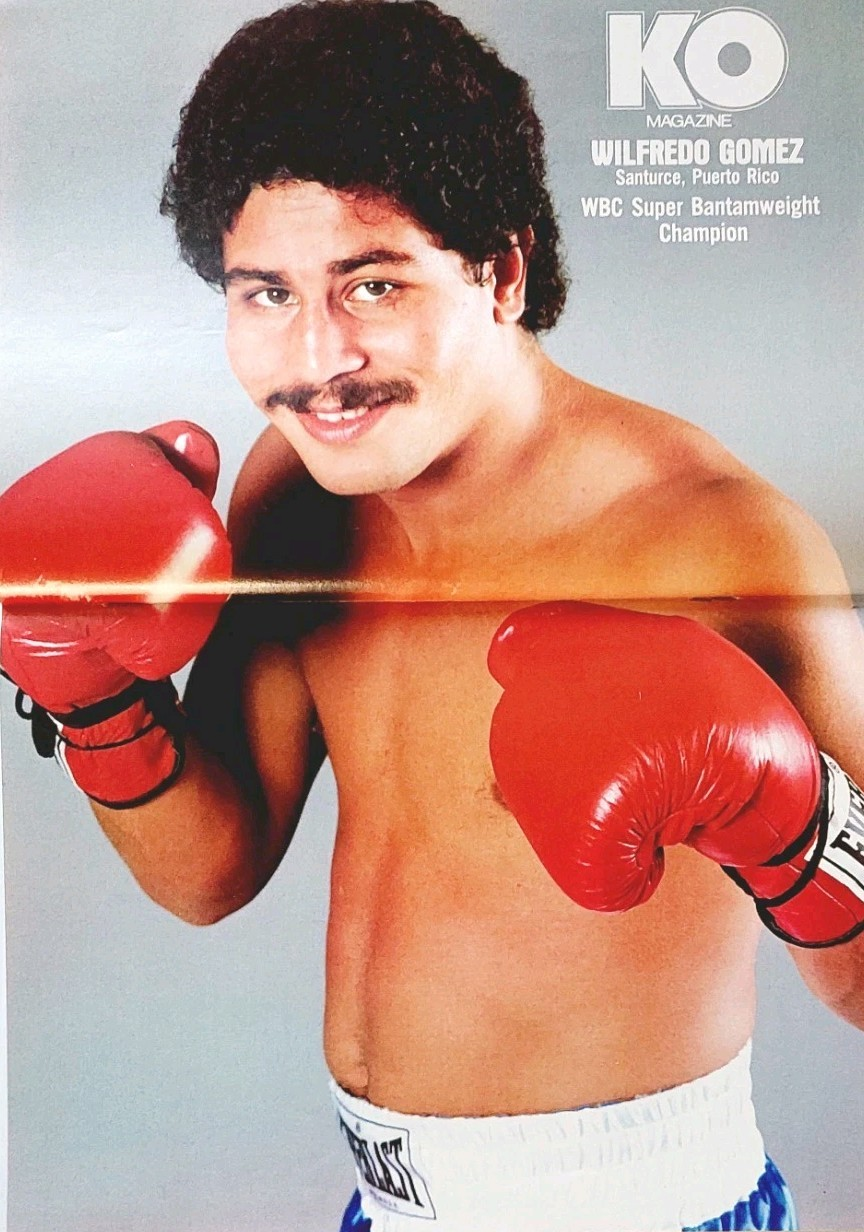
- Gómez c. 1982

Personal information
- Nickname: Bazooka
- Nationality: Puerto Rican
- Born: Wilfredo Gómez Rivera; October 29, 1956 San Juan, Puerto Rico
- Died: October 10, 2026 (aged 69)
- Height: 5 ft 5 1/2 in (166 cm)
- Weight: Super bantamweight; Featherweight; Super featherweight

Boxing career
- Reach: 66 1/2 in (169 cm)
- Stance: Orthodox

Boxing record
- Total fights: 48
- Wins: 44
- Win by KO: 42
- Losses: 3
- Draws: 1
Medal record
Men's boxing
Representing Puerto Rico
World Amateur Championships
Gold medal – first place	1974 Havana	Bantamweight
Central American and Caribbean Games
Gold medal – first place	1974 Santo Domingo	-54 kg

Wilfredo Gómez Rivera (Note: In this name that follows Hispanic American naming customs, the first or paternal surname is Gómez and the second or maternal family name is Rivera.) (Spanish pronunciation: [wilˈfɾeðo ˈɣomes]; October 29, 1956 – October 10, 2026), sometimes referred to as Bazooka Gómez, was a Puerto Rican professional boxer and three weight world champion. He is frequently mentioned among the best Puerto Rican boxers of all time by sports journalists and analysts, along with Félix Trinidad, Miguel Cotto, Wilfred Benítez, Esteban De Jesús, Edwin Rosario, and Carlos Ortíz.

His seventeen consecutive knockouts in championship defenses as a junior featherweight is a record for all boxing divisions. He was ranked number 13 on The Ring magazine's list of the "100 greatest punchers of all time". In 1995, Gómez was inducted into the International Boxing Hall of Fame.

== Early life ==
Gómez was born in a poor area of Las Monjas of Hato Rey in San Juan, Puerto Rico, the son of Jacobo Gómez and Paula Rivera. Gómez reportedly used a bicycle as means of transportation when he was young, and he sold candy to earn pocket money before becoming an amateur boxer.

== Amateur career and professional debut ==
Gómez won the gold medal at the 1974 Central American and Caribbean Games held in Santo Domingo, Dominican Republic, and 1974 World Championships in Havana, Cuba before turning professional. He also competed in the 1972 Olympic Games in Munich, Germany, getting eliminated by an Egyptian rival in the Olympic's first round of bouts. He compiled an overall record of 96 wins and 3 defeats as an amateur boxer. Because of his family's economic situation, he decided not to wait for the 1976 Olympic Games in Montreal, Quebec, Canada, opting to begin making money right after the 1974 World Amateur Boxing championship instead. Coming from Puerto Rico, he settled for less money and exposure from the U.S. media, and moved to Panama, where he began to tour all of Central America in hopes of finding matches. His professional debut came in Panama City, Panama, where he fought to a draw with Jacinto Fuentes.

== Professional career ==
After this inauspicious debut, he reeled off a streak of 32 consecutive knockouts including wins over Fuentes, who was dispatched in 2 rounds in a rematch, and future world champion Alberto Davila, who lasted 9 rounds before being defeated. His 32 consecutive knockouts place him in a third place tie with Deontay Wilder and behind LaMar Clark (44) and Billy Fox (43) for the all-time knockout streak.

Gómez's knockout streak caught the eye of the WBC and Lineal Super Bantamweight champion Dong Kyun Yum of South Korea, who travelled to San Juan, Puerto Rico, to defend his crown against Gómez. Yum had a promising start, dropping Gómez 30 seconds into the bout, but Gómez picked himself up and eventually won the crown, his first world title, with a 12th-round knockout. His second defense took him to Tokyo, where he beat former world champion Royal Kobayashi in three rounds. Kobayashi had lasted 5 rounds vs Alexis Argüello. Next was Sagat Petchyindee in a small city in Thailand. He lasted two rounds. Petchyindee later became a world champion Thai and kick-boxer and famous actor in Thailand. The bout with Petchyindee was preceded by a large tragedy when a column collapsed inside the stadium before the evening's main event; ten people lost their lives and an estimated 300 were injured, but the contest's organizers nevertheless decided to continue with the day's boxing card.

Gómez's streak reached 32 knockouts in a row, including what is generally considered to be his biggest victory ever, a five-round defeat of bantamweight champion Carlos Zárate, who was 55–0 with 54 knockout wins coming into their San Juan bout. Also included in that streak was future world champion Leo Cruz, beaten in 13 rounds at San Juan and Derrik Holmes, knocked out in five rounds in a fight attended, among others, by Sylvester Stallone, Carl Weathers and Alexis Arguello. After recording his 32nd. knockout win in a row, he moved up in weight to face the world featherweight champion Salvador Sánchez of Mexico. He lost to Salvador Sanchez vis an 8th-round TKO.

External audio
- You may watch Wilfredo Gómez fight various boxers, among them Lupe Pintor, here

Hoping to get a rematch with Sanchez, Gómez went back to the super bantamweight division, where he got a dispensation from the WBC to make two preparation bouts before defending his title again. He did so and won two non-title bouts, both by knockout, one in the 2nd round over Jose Luis Soto, who was a stablemate of Julio César Chávez back in Culiacán, Mexico. Wins over future world champ Juan 'Kid' Meza, knocked out in six rounds in Atlantic City, and Juan Antonio Lopez, knocked out in ten as part of the Larry Holmes vs. Gerry Cooney undercard followed. But all chances of a rematch with Sanchez were dashed when Sanchez died in a car crash outside Mexico City the morning of August 12, 1982. Boxing fans across Latin America mourned the tragedy. Gómez, who was training to defend against Mexican Roberto Rubaldino only five days later, took a quick trip to Mexico to offer Sanchez flowers and then returned to Puerto Rico the same afternoon. He beat Rubaldino by knockout in 8 rounds and made one more title defense, against the Mexican bantamweight world champ Lupe Pintor in New Orleans, winning by knockout in 14 rounds. The Pintor contest was the only time a Gómez fight was showcased on HBO, which at the time exclusively showcased the largest boxing fights, much like the Pay Per View system does currently.

By the time he was done with the Junior Featherweights, Gómez had established a division record of 17 defenses, and a world record of most defenses in a row won by knockout, all his defenses finishing before the established distance limit.

== Featherweight division ==
Gómez then re-tried winning the Featherweight title and this time, he achieved his dream, winning his second world title by dethroning Juan Laporte, a fellow Puerto Rican who had won the title left vacant after Sanchez died. He beat Laporte by a 12-round unanimous decision. This time, however, he didn't enjoy a lengthy title reign. Ahead on all scorecards, Gómez was the victim of a rally by Azumah Nelson of Ghana who knocked him out in 11 rounds in San Juan, December 8, 1984.

He wanted either a rematch with Nelson or a shot at WBA and Lineal Junior Lightweight world champion Rocky Lockridge of New Jersey, whichever came first. Lockridge was first to offer Gómez a try, and the 2 battled a closely scored 15 round bout in San Juan, with Gómez being given a majority 15-round decision, which many experts have said Lockridge deserved, but also which in the opinion of most who saw it live, was a justified decision.

Around this time, he began a short lived career as a boxing broadcaster. He specifically covered the Victor Callejas-Loris Stecca rematch from Italy for Puerto Rico's WAPA-TV, won by Callejas by sixth-round technical knockout, and some local matches involving Alberto Mercado and Juan Carazo in Puerto Rico for Tele-Once.

This reign also came to an end quick, Gómez being handed his 3rd loss at the hands of young Alfredo Layne by knockout in 9 rounds. Layne lost the title in his own first defense to South Africa's Brian Mitchell, and it became obvious Gómez's best years had gone by, so he retired after this fight.

== Last fights and retirement ==
Gómez tried a comeback in 1988 and 1989, but after winning 2 more bouts by knockout, he realized boxing wasn't in his heart anymore and retired for good. He later moved to Venezuela, where he ran into drug problems, causing him trouble with the law and spending some months in jail. He attended a rehabilitation center in Colombia. Gómez rebounded and was later back in Puerto Rico, where he has managed to stay off drugs. He helped Hector Camacho with the training of Camacho's son Héctor Camacho Jr., who was a boxer in the Jr Welterweight division. In 1998, Gómez became a born-again Christian.

On May 18, 2003, Gómez returned to Panama, where he was received by friends Roberto Duran and Eusebio Pedroza, among others. In a message geared towards Panamanians, he expressed thanks to that country, calling it his second country and saying, among other things "I'm very motivated now that I will return to Puerto Rico, and no one should be surprised if I buy an apartment in Panama and move my family here". However, he bought a house in Orlando, Florida in 2006.

He had a record of 44 wins, 3 losses and 1 draw, with 42 knockout wins and all three losses also by knockout. In 1978, he was named Boxing Illustrated's Fighter of the Year. He is a member of the International Boxing Hall of Fame. Gómez was voted as the Greatest Super Bantamweight Ever in 2014 by the Houston Boxing Hall Of Fame. The HBHOF is a voting body composed totally of current and former fighters. In 2003 a biographical film titled Bazooka: The Battles of Wilfredo Gómez was produced by Cinemar Films, the documentary was directed by Mario Diaz and was filmed in New York City.

== Professional boxing record ==
48 fights	44 wins	3 losses
By knockout	42	3
By decision	2	0
Draws	1	

No.	Result	Record	Opponent	Type	Round, time	Date	Location	Notes
48	Win	44–3–1	Mario Salazar	KO	2 (10), 1:45	Jul 19, 1989	Diplomat Hotel, Hallandale Beach, Florida, U.S.	
47	Win	43–3–1	Mario González	TKO	6 (8), 1:58	Jul 30, 1988	Convention Center, Miami Beach, Florida, U.S.	
46	Loss	42–3–1	Alfredo Layne	TKO	9 (15), 0:32	May 24, 1986	Roberto Clemente Coliseum, San Juan, Puerto Rico	Lost WBA and The Ring super featherweight title
45	Win	42–2–1	Rocky Lockridge	MD	15	May 19, 1985	Roberto Clemente Coliseum, San Juan, Puerto Rico	Won WBA and The Ring super featherweight titles
44	Loss	41–2–1	Azumah Nelson	KO	11 (12), 2:58	Dec 8, 1984	Hiram Bithorn Stadium, San Juan, Puerto Rico	Lost WBC featherweight title
43	Win	41–1–1	Juan Laporte	UD	12	Mar 31, 1984	Roberto Clemente Coliseum, San Juan, Puerto Rico	Won WBC featherweight title
42	Win	40–1–1	Eladio Santana	KO	2 (?), 0:46	Dec 14, 1983	Roberto Clemente Coliseum, San Juan, Puerto Rico	
41	Win	39–1–1	Iván Samuco	TKO	3 (10), 1:45	Apr 23, 1983	Auditorio Juan Pachín Vicéns, Ponce, Puerto Rico	
40	Win	38–1–1	Lupe Pintor	TKO	14 (15), 2:44	Dec 3, 1982	Superdome, New Orleans, Louisiana, U.S.	Retained WBC and The Ring super bantamweight titles
39	Win	37–1–1	Roberto Rubaldino	RTD	7 (15), 3:00	Aug 18, 1982	Hiram Bithorn Stadium, San Juan, Puerto Rico	Retained WBC and The Ring super bantamweight titles
38	Win	36–1–1	Juan Antonio López	TKO	10 (15), 1:02	Jun 11, 1982	Caesars Palace, Paradise, Nevada, U.S.	Retained WBC and The Ring super bantamweight titles
37	Win	35–1–1	Juan Meza	TKO	6 (15), 2:28	Mar 27, 1982	Playboy Hotel & Casino, Atlantic City, New Jersey, U.S.	Retained WBC and The Ring super bantamweight titles
36	Win	34–1–1	José Luis Soto	KO	2 (?), 2:33	Feb 20, 1982	Roberto Clemente Coliseum, San Juan, Puerto Rico	
35	Win	33–1–1	José González	TKO	7 (?)	Jan 9, 1982	Roberto Clemente Coliseum, San Juan, Puerto Rico	
34	Loss	32–1–1	Salvador Sánchez	TKO	8 (15), 2:09	Aug 21, 1981	Caesars Palace, Paradise, Nevada, U.S.	For WBC featherweight title
33	Win	32–0–1	Raúl Silva	KO	3 (10), 0:51	Jun 20, 1981	Roberto Clemente Coliseum, San Juan, Puerto Rico	
32	Win	31–0–1	José Cervantes	KO	3 (15), 1:50	Dec 13, 1980	Miami Jai-Alai Fronton, Miami, Florida, U.S.	Retained WBC and The Ring super bantamweight titles
31	Win	30–0–1	Derrik Holmes	TKO	5 (15), 2:29	Aug 22, 1980	Caesars Palace, Paradise, Nevada, U.S.	Retained WBC and The Ring super bantamweight titles
30	Win	29–0–1	Eddie Ndukwu	TKO	4 (12), 1:58	Apr 27, 1980	Hiram Bithorn Stadium, San Juan, Puerto Rico	
29	Win	28–0–1	Rubén Valdéz	RTD	6 (15), 3:00	Feb 3, 1980	Caesars Palace, Paradise, Nevada, U.S.	Retained WBC and The Ring super bantamweight titles
28	Win	27–0–1	Nicky Pérez	TKO	5 (15), 3:00	Oct 26, 1979	Madison Square Garden, New York City, New York, U.S.	Retained WBC and The Ring super bantamweight titles
27	Win	26–0–1	Carlos Mendoza	TKO	10 (15), 2:29	Sep 28, 1979	Caesars Palace, Paradise, Nevada, U.S.	Retained WBC and The Ring super bantamweight titles
26	Win	25–0–1	Julio Hernández	TKO	5 (15), 2:15	Jun 16, 1979	Roberto Clemente Coliseum, San Juan, Puerto Rico	Retained WBC and The Ring super bantamweight titles
25	Win	24–0–1	Nelson Cruz Tamariz	KO	2 (10), 1:10	May 21, 1979	Madison Square Garden, New York City, New York, U.S.	
24	Win	23–0–1	Néstor Carlos Jiménez	KO	2 (10), 2:51	Mar 9, 1979	Madison Square Garden, New York City, New York, U.S.	Retained WBC super bantamweight title; Won inaugural The Ring super bantamweight title
23	Win	22–0–1	Carlos Zárate	TKO	5 (15), 0:44	Oct 28, 1978	Roberto Clemente Coliseum, San Juan, Puerto Rico	Retained WBC super bantamweight title
22	Win	21–0–1	Leo Cruz	TKO	13 (15), 0:21	Sep 9, 1978	Hiram Bithorn Stadium, San Juan, Puerto Rico	Retained WBC super bantamweight title
21	Win	20–0–1	Sagat Petchyindee	TKO	3 (15), 2:32	Jun 2, 1978	Provincial Stadium, Nakhon Ratchasima, Thailand	Retained WBC super bantamweight title
20	Win	19–0–1	Juan Antonio López	TKO	7 (15), 2:41	Apr 8, 1978	Juan Ramón Loubriel Stadium, Bayamón, Puerto Rico	Retained WBC super bantamweight title
19	Win	18–0–1	Royal Kobayashi	KO	3 (15), 1:26	Jan 19, 1978	Municipal Gymnasium, Kitakyushu, Japan	Retained WBC super bantamweight title
18	Win	17–0–1	Raúl Tirado	TKO	5 (15), 2:59	Jul 11, 1977	Roberto Clemente Coliseum, San Juan, Puerto Rico	Retained WBC super bantamweight title
17	Win	16–0–1	Yum Dong-kyun	KO	12 (15), 2:40	May 21, 1977	Roberto Clemente Coliseum, San Juan, Puerto Rico	Won WBC super bantamweight title
16	Win	15–0–1	John Meza	TKO	2 (10), 2:59	Feb 12, 1977	Juan Ramón Loubriel Stadium, Bayamón, Puerto Rico	
15	Win	14–0–1	José Murillo Medel	KO	4 (12), 2:45	Oct 11, 1976	Roberto Clemente Coliseum, San Juan, Puerto Rico	
14	Win	13–0–1	Tony Rocha	KO	2 (?)	Aug 16, 1976	Roberto Clemente Coliseum, San Juan, Puerto Rico	
13	Win	12–0–1	Alberto Dávila	TKO	9 (10)	Jul 19, 1976	Roberto Clemente Coliseum, San Juan, Puerto Rico	
12	Win	11–0–1	Sak Lempthong	TKO	3 (10)	May 8, 1976	Juan Ramón Loubriel Stadium, Bayamón, Puerto Rico	
11	Win	10–0–1	Ric Quijano	KO	1 (10)	Apr 5, 1976	Roberto Clemente Coliseum, San Juan, Puerto Rico	
10	Win	9–0–1	Cornell Hall	TKO	3 (10)	Feb 20, 1976	Roberto Clemente Coliseum, San Juan, Puerto Rico	
9	Win	8–0–1	Andres Hernández	TKO	8 (10)	Dec 20, 1975	Roberto Clemente Coliseum, San Juan, Puerto Rico	
8	Win	7–0–1	Joe Guevara	TKO	6 (?)	Sep 19, 1975	Roberto Clemente Coliseum, San Juan, Puerto Rico	
7	Win	6–0–1	Cleo García	KO	3 (6)	Aug 2, 1975	Managua, Nicaragua	
6	Win	5–0–1	Jacinto Fuentes	KO	2 (8), 1:58	Jun 21, 1975	Gimnasio Nuevo Panama, Panama City, Panama	
5	Win	4–0–1	Jose Jiménez	KO	1 (6)	May 3, 1975	Gimnasio Nuevo Panama, Panama City, Panama	
4	Win	3–0–1	Antonio Da Silva	KO	2 (8), 2:40	Mar 2, 1975	Gimnasio Nuevo Panama, Panama City, Panama	
3	Win	2–0–1	Jorge Bernal	TKO	1 (8), 2:28	Feb 15, 1975	Gimnasio Nuevo Panama, Panama City, Panama	
2	Win	1–0–1	Mario Hernández	TKO	1 (6), 2:58	Dec 21, 1974	Plaza de Toros, Zapote, Costa Rica	
1	Draw	0–0–1	Jacinto Fuentes	MD	6	Nov 16, 1974	Gimnasio Nuevo Panama, Panama City, Panama	

== Titles in boxing ==
=== Major world titles ===
- WBC super bantamweight champion (122 lbs)
- WBC featherweight champion (126 lbs)
- WBA super featherweight champion (130 lbs)

=== The Ring magazine titles ===
- The Ring super bantamweight champion (122 lbs)
- The Ring super featherweight champion (130 lbs)

== Personal life and death ==
Gómez was married to Carolina Gamboa. He had three daughters and one son.

He declared that Fighting Harada was his idol as a child.

On April 17, 2015, Gómez was arrested by Puerto Rican police after allegedly hitting his 59-year-old companion, a lady with whom he had been living for ten months. He was released after she refused to raise charges against him.

British boxer Michael Gomez adapted his last name from Armstrong to Gomez as a homage to Wilfredo, who was his childhood idol.

A biographical book about Gómez, written by author Christian Giudice and named "A Fire Burns Within", was released May 9, 2016.

Gómez was hospitalized on May 21, 2018, in Cupey, Puerto Rico, suffering from a pulmonary edema and pneumonia.

In March 2022, Gomez was rescued by his wife Carolina Gamboa, son Wilfredo Jr., and by friend, fellow former world boxing champion Victor Callejas, from his ex lover, identified as Diana Sevilla Villalobos, who apparently was holding him hostage at his Venus Gardens, Cupey (San Juan) house. Gomez was taken to a psychiatric hospital. Gomez subsequently recovered and returned to his wife by choice.

Wilfredo Gómez died on October 10, 2026, at the age of 69. He was buried in Guaynabo, Puerto Rico.

== Honors ==
Both the Wilfredo Gómez boxing gym and the Complejo Deportivo Wilfredo Gómez (Wilfredo Gómez Sporting Complex) in Guaynabo are named after him.

== See also ==
- Boxing in Puerto Rico
- List of Puerto Rican boxing world champions
- List of world super-bantamweight boxing champions
- List of world featherweight boxing champions
- List of world super-featherweight boxing champions
- List of boxing triple champions
- List of Puerto Ricans

== Notes ==
Sporting positions
World boxing titles
Preceded by Yum Dong-kyun	WBC super-bantamweight champion May 21, 1977 – May 1983; Vacated	Vacant Title next held by Jaime Garza
Inaugural champion	The Ring super-bantamweight champion March 9, 1979 – May 1983; Vacated	Vacant Title next held by Paulie Ayala
Preceded by Juan Laporte	WBC featherweight champion March 31, 1984 – December 8, 1984	Succeeded by Azumah Nelson
Preceded by Rocky Lockridge	WBA super-featherweight champion May 19, 1985 – May 24, 1986	Succeeded by Alfredo Layne
Preceded by Rocky Lockridge	The Ring super-featherweight champion May 19, 1985 – May 24, 1986	Succeeded by Alfredo Layne
Awards
Previous: William Lee vs. John LoCicero; Round 5	The Ring Round of the Year vs. Lupe Pintor; Round 3; 1982	Next: Larry Holmes vs. Tim Witherspoon; Round 9
