= Wilfred Benítez =

Puerto Rican boxer (born 1958)

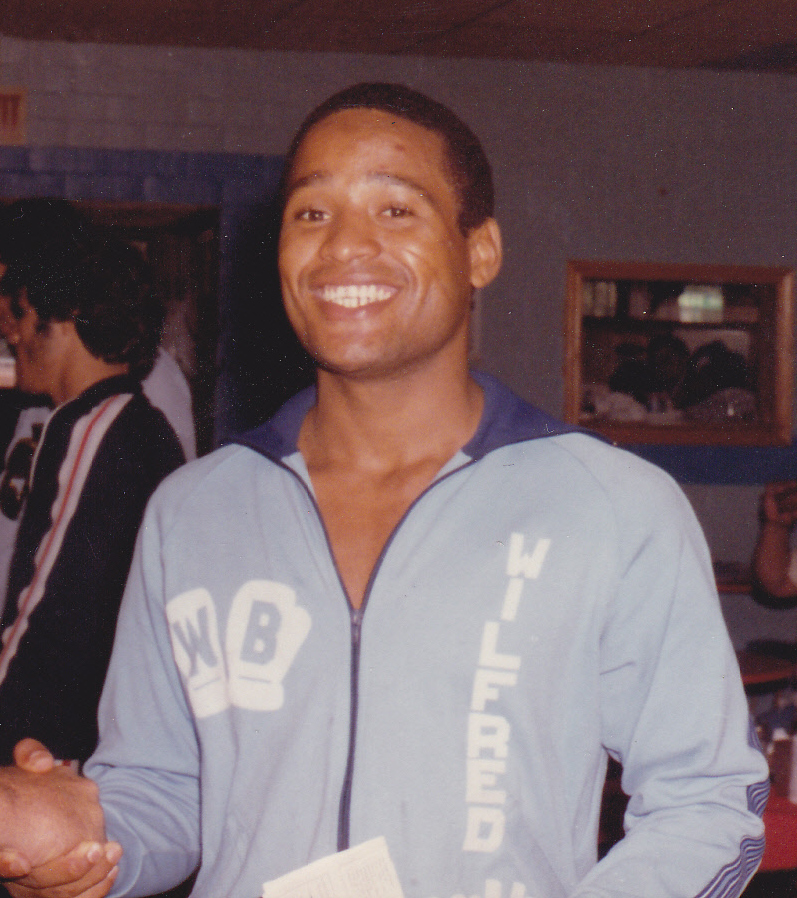
- Benítez in 1980

Personal information
- Nicknames: El Radar ("The Radar"); Bible of Boxing
- Born: September 12, 1958 (age 68) New York City, U.S.
- Height: 5 ft 10 in (178 cm)
- Weight: Light welterweight; Welterweight; Light middleweight

Boxing career
- Reach: 70 in (178 cm)
- Stance: Orthodox

Boxing record
- Total fights: 62
- Wins: 53
- Win by KO: 31
- Losses: 8
- Draws: 1

Wilfred "Wilfredo" Benítez Rosa (born September 12, 1958), better known as Wilfred Benitez, is a Puerto Rican former professional boxer and the youngest world champion in the sport's history. Earning his first of three career world titles in separate weight divisions at the age of seventeen, he is best remembered as a skilled and aggressive fighter. He is widely considered one of the greatest defensive boxers of all time. He is also remembered for his fights with Roberto Durán, Thomas Hearns, and Sugar Ray Leonard.

Inducted into the International Boxing Hall of Fame in 1996, he is considered among the best Puerto Rican boxers of all time, sharing the honor with Félix Trinidad, Wilfredo Gómez, Carlos Ortiz, Héctor Camacho, Edwin Rosario and Miguel Cotto.

== Early history ==
Benítez turned pro at 15, a young prodigy who was managed by his father Gregorio Benítez, was a member of one of Puerto Rico's boxing families. His brothers Frankie and Gregory Benítez were all top contenders in the 1970s. The Benítez troop was largely directed by their mother, Clara Benítez (nee. Rosa). Young Wilfred was nicknamed "The Radar" for his uncanny ability to foresee and dodge his opponent's blows. He grew up going to a neighborhood boxing gym in New York, where he learned from watching his brothers and other local renowned fighters practice their skills.

During the early stages of his professional career, Benítez often traveled to Sint Maarten and New York City for fights. He divided his fights between those locations and Puerto Rico. The proximity of those two locations to Puerto Rico helped him start to become a household name in the island while building an international following at the same time. His speed, combined with punching power and surprising ring maturity for a 16-year-old, were enough to make him a world-ranked boxer by both the WBA and WBC, then boxing's only world-title recognizing organizations.

== Professional boxing career ==
On March 6, 1976, at age 17, with his high school classmates in attendance, he faced Lineal and WBA Light Welterweight champion Antonio Cervantes. Known as Kid Pambele, the champion was 30 years old, had a record of 74-9-3 with 35 KO's, and had made 10 title defenses. The result was a fifteen-round split decision in Benítez's favor. Benítez retained the championship three times, and then moved up to the welterweight division.

=== Moving up ===
Benítez challenged Lineal and WBC World Champion Carlos Palomino in San Juan. On January 14, 1979, Benítez won a fifteen-round split decision to become a world champion in a second weight division. Referee Zach Clayton scored the fight 145-142 in Palomino's favor, but judges Jay Edson and Harry Gibbs disagreed. Edson scored the bout 146-142 for Benítez. Gibbs also scored for Benítez, 146-142. After outpointing Harold Weston Jr. in his first defense (avenging an earlier draw), Benítez fought Sugar Ray Leonard in Las Vegas, Nevada on November 30, 1979.

=== Fighting Sugar Ray Leonard ===
It was a scientific fight by both fighters, who demonstrated their defensive skills throughout the bout. Benítez suffered a third-round knockdown and a cut on his forehead, which was opened by an accidental head butt in round six. Leonard put Benítez down again in the fifteenth round and the referee stopped the fight with six seconds left in round fifteen. Leonard was ahead on all cards at the time of the stoppage. The scores were 137–133, 137–130 and 136–134, all for Leonard.

=== Moving up again ===
After that loss, Benítez again moved up in weight, and on May 23, 1981, at age 22, he became the youngest three-time world champion in boxing history by knocking out WBC World Super Welterweight Champion Maurice Hope in twelve rounds in Las Vegas. The knockout was named one of the knockouts of the year.

His next fight became a historic bout. On November 14, 1981, he fought future world champ Carlos Santos of Ceiba, Puerto Rico. It was the first world championship fight between two Puerto Ricans in boxing history. It was fought 3,000 miles away from Puerto Rico, at Caesars Palace in Las Vegas. Benítez won a fifteen-round unanimous decision. His next defense was against Roberto Durán, whom Benítez defeated at Caesars Palace on January 30, 1982 by a fifteen-round unanimous decision. On December 3, 1982, at the Carnival of Champions in New Orleans, Benítez lost the belt to another boxing legend, Thomas Hearns, by a fifteen-round majority decision.

=== Career decline ===
Benítez's career went downwards after the fight with Hearns, as did his lifestyle. In 1983, he lost a unanimous decision to Mustafa Hamsho. In 1984, he tried a comeback under the hand of Yamil Chade, but this proved unsuccessful as he was knocked out in the second round by Davey Moore. On November 28, 1986, with his health declining, Benítez went to Salta, Argentina to fight against middleweight Carlos Herrera. Benítez was stopped in seven rounds. But to make matters worse, his money for the fight was stolen by the promoter, along with his documents and passport, and he was stranded in Argentina for over a year. After eventually being tracked down, and after much government huddling and talks, he was finally able to fly back home to Puerto Rico in 1988.

In 1990, with his health in increasingly worse shape, Benítez moved to Tucson, Arizona, where he tried another comeback under the tutelage of Emanuel Steward, the Kronk trainer. This also proved unsuccessful, as he went 2-2 in his last four fights. His last bout took place in Winnipeg, Canada on September 18, 1990, six days after his 32nd birthday. He lost a ten-round decision against Scott Papasadora.

== Professional boxing record ==
62 fights	53 wins	8 losses
By knockout	31	4
By decision	22	4
Draws	1	

No.	Result	Record	Opponent	Type	Round, time	Date	Location	Notes
62	Loss	53–8–1	Scott Papasodora	UD	10	Sep 18, 1990	Winnipeg Convention Centre, Winnipeg, Manitoba, Canada	
61	Win	53–7–1	Sam Wilson	UD	10	Aug 24, 1990	Regency Hotel, Denver, Colorado, U.S.	
60	Loss	52–7–1	Pat Lawlor	SD	10	May 23, 1990	Amigos Indoor Soccer Stadium, Tucson, Arizona, U.S.	
59	Win	52–6–1	Ariel Conde	KO	7 (10), 1:47	Mar 8, 1990	Americana Motel, Phoenix, Arizona, U.S.	
58	Loss	51–6–1	Carlos Herrera	TKO	7 (10)	Nov 28, 1986	Salta, Argentina	
57	Win	51–5–1	Harry Daniels	UD	10	Sep 17, 1986	Fifth Regiment Armory, Baltimore, Maryland, U.S.	
56	Win	50–5–1	Paul Whittaker	UD	10	Jul 1, 1986	Louisiana Superdome, New Orleans, Louisiana, U.S.	
55	Loss	49–5–1	Matthew Hilton	KO	9 (10), 2:59	Feb 15, 1986	Paul Sauvé Arena, Montreal, Quebec, Canada	
54	Win	49–4–1	Kevin Moley	UD	10	Aug 21, 1985	Madison Square Garden, New York City, New York, U.S.	
53	Win	48–4–1	Danny Chapman	RTD	7 (10), 3:00	Jul 6, 1985	Washington Convention Center, Washington D.C., U.S.	
52	Win	47–4–1	Mauricio Bravo	TKO	2 (10)	Mar 30, 1985	Oranjestad, Aruba	
51	Loss	46–4–1	Davey Moore	TKO	2 (10), 1:18	Jul 14, 1984	Stade Louis II, Monte Carlo, Monaco	
50	Win	46–3–1	Stacy McSwain	UD	10	Feb 11, 1984	Joe Louis Arena, Detroit, Michigan, U.S.	
49	Loss	45–3–1	Mustafa Hamsho	UD	12	Jul 16, 1983	Dunes Hotel, Las Vegas, Nevada, U.S.	
48	Win	45–2–1	Tony Cerda	UD	10	May 18, 1983	Dunes Hotel, Las Vegas, Nevada, U.S.	
47	Loss	44–2–1	Thomas Hearns	MD	15	Dec 3, 1982	Louisiana Superdome, New Orleans, Louisiana, U.S.	Lost WBC light middleweight title; For vacant The Ring light middleweight title
46	Win	44–1–1	Roberto Durán	UD	15	Jan 30, 1982	Caesars Palace, Las Vegas, Nevada, U.S.	Retained WBC light middleweight title
45	Win	43–1–1	Carlos Santos	UD	15	Nov 14, 1981	Showboat Hotel and Casino, Las Vegas, Nevada, U.S.	Retained WBC light middleweight title
44	Win	42–1–1	Maurice Hope	KO	12 (15), 1:56	May 23, 1981	Caesars Palace, Las Vegas, Nevada, U.S.	Won WBC light middleweight title
43	Win	41–1–1	Pete Ranzany	UD	10	Dec 12, 1980	Sacramento, California, U.S.	
42	Win	40–1–1	Tony Chiaverini	TKO	8 (10)	Aug 1, 1980	Caesars Palace, Las Vegas, Nevada, U.S.	
41	Win	39–1–1	Johnny Turner	TKO	9 (10), 2:57	Mar 16, 1980	Jai-Alai Fronton, Miami, Florida, U.S.	
40	Loss	38–1–1	Sugar Ray Leonard	TKO	15 (15), 2:54	Nov 30, 1979	Caesars Palace, Las Vegas, Nevada, U.S.	Lost WBC and The Ring welterweight titles
39	Win	38–0–1	Harold Weston	UD	15	Mar 25, 1979	Hiram Bithorn Stadium, San Juan, Puerto Rico	Retained WBC and The Ring welterweight titles
38	Win	37–0–1	Carlos Palomino	SD	15	Jan 14, 1979	Hiram Bithorn Stadium, San Juan, Puerto Rico	Won WBC and The Ring welterweight titles
37	Win	36–0–1	Vernon Lewis	UD	10	Dec 8, 1978	Madison Square Garden, New York City, New York, U.S.	
36	Win	35–0–1	Randy Shields	RTD	6 (10), 3:00	Aug 25, 1978	Madison Square Garden, New York City, New York, U.S.	
35	Win	34–0–1	Bruce Curry	MD	10	Feb 4, 1978	Madison Square Garden, New York City, New York, U.S.	
34	Win	33–0–1	Bruce Curry	SD	10	Nov 18, 1977	Madison Square Garden, New York City, New York, U.S.	
33	Win	32–0–1	Ray Chavez Guerrero	TKO	15 (15), 1:41	Aug 3, 1977	Madison Square Garden, New York City, New York, U.S.	Won vacant NYSAC light welterweight title
32	Win	31–0–1	Easy Boy Lake	TKO	1 (10), 2:48	Jul 1, 1977	Lionel Roberts Park, Saint Thomas, U.S. Virgin Islands	
31	Win	30–0–1	Roberto Gonzalez	KO	1	Jun 2, 1977	Saint Thomas, U.S. Virgin Islands	
30	Win	29–0–1	Melvin Dennis	UD	8	Mar 6, 1977	Correctional Facility Prison, Marion, Ohio, U.S.	
29	Draw	28–0–1	Harold Weston	PTS	10	Feb 2, 1977	New York City, New York, U.S.	
28	Win	28–0	Tony Petronelli	TKO	3 (15), 0:53	Oct 16, 1976	Hiram Bithorn Stadium, San Juan, Puerto Rico	Retained WBA and The Ring light welterweight titles
27	Win	27–0	Emiliano Villa	UD	15	May 31, 1976	San Juan, Puerto Rico	Retained WBA and The Ring light welterweight titles
26	Win	26–0	Antonio Cervantes	SD	15	Mar 6, 1976	Hiram Bithorn Stadium, San Juan, Puerto Rico	Won WBA and The Ring light welterweight titles
25	Win	25–0	Chris Fernandez	PTS	10	Dec 13, 1975	San Juan, Puerto Rico	
24	Win	24–0	Omar Ruben Realecio	TKO	6 (10)	Oct 20, 1975	Felt Forum, New York City, New York, U.S.	
23	Win	23–0	Marcelino Alicia	TKO	2 (10)	Sep 1, 1975	San Juan, Puerto Rico	
22	Win	22–0	Young Woodall	KO	4	Aug 19, 1975	Philipsburg, Sint Maarten, Netherlands Antilles	
21	Win	21–0	Eyue Jeudy	KO	4	Aug 1, 1975	Philipsburg, Sint Maarten, Netherlands Antilles	
20	Win	20–0	Jim Henry	TKO	8	Jun 28, 1975	Roberto Clemente Coliseum, San Juan, Puerto Rico	
19	Win	19–0	Angel Robinson Garcia	PTS	10	Jun 9, 1975	Juan Ramón Loubriel Stadium, San Juan, Puerto Rico	
18	Win	18–0	Santos Solis	SD	10	May 5, 1975	San Juan, Puerto Rico	
17	Win	17–0	Wilbur Seales	TKO	4	Mar 31, 1975	San Juan, Puerto Rico	
16	Win	16–0	Santiago Rosa	KO	4	Feb 8, 1975	San Juan, Puerto Rico	
15	Win	15–0	Francisco Rodriguez	TKO	7	Jan 4, 1975	San Juan, Puerto Rico	
14	Win	14–0	Lawrence Hafey	UD	8	Dec 2, 1974	Felt Forum, New York City, New York, U.S.	
13	Win	13–0	Terry Summerhays	TKO	6 (8), 1:51	Oct 25, 1974	Madison Square Garden, New York City, New York, U.S.	
12	Win	12–0	Al Hughes	TKO	5 (8), 2:06	Sep 16, 1974	Felt Forum, New York City, New York, U.S.	
11	Win	11–0	Easy Boy Lake	TKO	5	Aug 31, 1974	Philipsburg, Sint Maarten, Netherlands Antilles	
10	Win	10–0	Carlos Crispin	TKO	3	Jun 26, 1974	Roberto Clemente Coliseum, San Juan, Puerto Rico	
9	Win	9–0	Ives St Jean	KO	1	Jun 21, 1974	Philipsburg, Sint Maarten, Netherlands Antilles	
8	Win	8–0	Easy Boy Lake	KO	5	May 11, 1974	Philipsburg, Sint Maarten, Netherlands Antilles	
7	Win	7–0	Juan Disla	TKO	3 (10)	Apr 30, 1974	Roberto Clemente Coliseum, San Juan, Puerto Rico	
6	Win	6–0	Victor Mangual	PTS	8	Apr 1, 1974	San Juan, Puerto Rico	
5	Win	5–0	Roberto Flanders	KO	4	Feb 18, 1974	San Juan, Puerto Rico	
4	Win	4–0	Joe York	KO	2	Jan 26, 1974	Philipsburg, Sint Maarten, Netherlands Antilles	
3	Win	3–0	Hector Amadis	KO	4	Jan 7, 1974	San Juan, Puerto Rico	
2	Win	2–0	Jesse Torres	KO	2	Nov 30, 1973	Philipsburg, Sint Maarten, Netherlands Antilles	
1	Win	1–0	Hiram Santiago	KO	1	Nov 22, 1973	San Juan, Puerto Rico	

== Titles in boxing ==
=== Major world titles ===
- NYSAC light welterweight champion (140 lbs)
- WBA light welterweight champion (140 lbs)
- WBC welterweight champion (147 lbs)
- WBC light middleweight champion (154 lbs)

=== The Ring magazine titles ===
- The Ring light welterweight champion (140 lbs)
- The Ring welterweight champion (147 lbs)

== Retirement and illness ==
After retiring from boxing in late 1990, Benítez returned to Puerto Rico, where he lived with his mother Clara on a $200 a month pension provided by the World Boxing Council. Since 1989, Benítez has suffered from an incurable, degenerative brain condition caused by the blows that he took in the ring.

In 1997, Benítez was moved to a public nursing home for medical reasons by his mother Clara, a licensed nurse.

In 2002, Sugar Ray Leonard visited Benítez, who by this time had forgotten his identity. During the visit, their fight was shown on television. Consequently, Benítez remembered the event and said to Leonard, "Ray, I did not train for that fight."

In 2004, Benítez was diagnosed with diabetes, adding further complications to his worsening health. When his mother died in the summer of 2008, his sister Yvonne Benítez, took over his care.

In 2018, after Hurricane Maria destroyed his home and made it difficult for Benítez to receive therapy, an old friend and boxing mate, Luis Mateo, helped Benítez and his sister move to Chicago. It was their hope that in Chicago, Benítez would receive better health care.

== Support, recovery and public appearance ==
Ring 10, a non-profit organization that helps impoverished former fighters, provides a monthly stipend to Benítez and established "The Wilfred Benítez Fund" to raise more money to aid the fallen champion.

During 2012, Benítez was honored with a statue in Puerto Rico.

On November 27, 2012, a smiling and healthy looking Benítez attended the funeral of Hector Camacho in Puerto Rico, arriving in a wheelchair. Benítez arrived accompanied by boxers Félix Trinidad, Wilfredo Gómez, and Alfredo Escalera. Surprising the mourners, Benítez rose to his feet for a boxing pose in front of Camacho's coffin.

With the emotional and financial assistance of former Benitez sparring partner Luis Mateo and Chicago's Puerto Rican community, on June 1, 2018, in the aftermath of Hurricane Maria, Wilfred Benitez, age 59, and his sister Yvonne Benitez, arrived in Chicago, Illinois, where he spent the first week in the hospital, then was moved to an apartment on Chicago's West Side. Donations from the Chicago Puerto Rican community helped pay for the plane tickets, and continue ongoing to provide expense money for the apartment, food, and other necessities, according to Mateo and Yvonne Benitez. Wilfred appears in overall better health, good spirits, has gained weight, tries to talk, and is more alert since his arrival in the mainland United States.

== Awards and recognitions ==
- Benítez was inducted to the International Boxing Hall of Fame in 1996.
- Key to the City Carolina, Puerto Rico (1984)

== See also ==
- List of world light-welterweight boxing champions
- List of world welterweight boxing champions
- List of world light-middleweight boxing champions
- List of boxing triple champions
- List of Puerto Rican boxing world champions
- Sports in Puerto Rico
- Afro–Puerto Ricans

Sporting positions
World boxing titles
Preceded by Antonio Cervantes	WBA light welterweight champion March 6 - November 28, 1976; Stripped	Vacant Title next held by Antonio Cervantes
Preceded by Antonio Cervantes	The Ring light welterweight champion March 6, 1976 - 1979; Vacated	Vacant Title next held by Antonio Cervantes
Preceded by Carlos Palomino	WBC welterweight champion January 14 - November 30, 1979	Succeeded by Sugar Ray Leonard
Preceded by Carlos Palomino	The Ring welterweight champion January 14 - November 30, 1979	Succeeded by Sugar Ray Leonard
Preceded by Maurice Hope	WBC light middleweight champion May 23, 1981 – December 3, 1982	Succeeded by Thomas Hearns
Records
Preceded by Tony Canzoneri	Youngest World Champion; March 6, 1976 – present 17 years 5 months 24 days old	Incumbent
