= Juan Antonio López =

Mexican boxer

Juan Antonio López (June 15, 1952, in Culiacán, Sinaloa – June 29, 2004, in Culiacán) was a Mexican professional boxer who competed from 1971 to 1992.

López was best known for fighting Wilfredo Gómez twice for the WBC Super Bantamweight title, losing by a knockout in seven rounds the first time, and by a knockout in ten rounds the second time. Most importantly, he is credited with introducing Julio César Chávez to the sport. He retired in 1992 with a 66-19 record (46 KO’s), and trained other fighters from his native Culiacán.

In January 2003, it was learned that López had leukemia. He died on June 29, 2004.

Julio César Chávez told The New York Times in 1992 that he considered López to be his hero as a child and tried to emulate him.
