= Boxing at the 1976 Summer Olympics – Welterweight =

Olympic boxing tournament

Welterweight boxing at the Games of the XXI Olympiad
- Venue: Maurice Richard Arena, Montreal
- Dates: 18–31 July 1976
- Competitors: 31 from 31 nations

Medalists
1st place, gold medalist(s)		Jochen Bachfeld	East Germany
2nd place, silver medalist(s)		Pedro Gamarro	Venezuela
3rd place, bronze medalist(s)		Reinhard Skricek	West Germany
3rd place, bronze medalist(s)		Victor Zilberman	Romania

The men's welterweight event was part of the boxing programme at the 1976 Summer Olympics. The weight class allowed boxers of up to 67 kilograms to compete. The competition was held from 18 to 31 July 1976. 31 boxers from 31 nations competed.

== Medalists ==
Gold	Jochen Bachfeld; East Germany
Silver	Pedro Gamarro; Venezuela
Bronze	Reinhard Skricek; West Germany
Bronze	Victor Zilberman; Romania

== Results ==
The following boxers took part in the event:

Rank	Name	Country
1	Jochen Bachfeld	East Germany
2	Pedro Gamarro	Venezuela
3T	Reinhard Skricek	West Germany
3T	Victor Zilberman	Romania
5T	Mike McCallum	Jamaica
5T	Carlos Santos	Puerto Rico
5T	Clint Jackson	United States
5T	Carmen Rinke	Canada
9T	Robert Dauer	Australia
9T	Wesly Felix	Haiti
9T	Ib Bøtcher	Denmark
9T	Yoshifumi Seki	Japan
9T	Luigi Minchillo	Italy
9T	Emilio Correa	Cuba
9T	Colin Jones	Great Britain
9T	Valery Rachkov	Soviet Union
17T	Frans van Bronckhorst	Indonesia
17T	José Vallejo	Dominican Republic
17T	Zbigniew Kicka	Poland
17T	Marijan Beneš	Yugoslavia
17T	Athanasios Iliadis	Greece
17T	Damdinjavyn Bandi	Mongolia
17T	Plamen Yankov	Bulgaria
17T	Carlos Mejia	Colombia
17T	Christy McLoughlin	Ireland
17T	Kim Ju-seok	South Korea
17T	David Jackson	New Zealand
28T	Marcelino Garcia	Virgin Islands
28T	Ali Bahri Khomani	Iran
28T	Kalevi Marjamaa	Finland
28T	Fredj Chtioui	Tunisia

=== First round ===
- Ju Seok-Kim (KOR) def. Marcelino García (ISV), walk-over
- Yoshioki Seki (JPN) def. Mathias Sabo (NGA), walk-over
- Jochen Bachfeld (GDR) def. Ali Bahri Khomani (IRN), RSC-1
- Athanasios Iliadis (GRE) def. Omar Shima (LIB), walk-over
- Valeri Rachkov (URS) def. Martti Marjamaa (FIN), RSC-3
- David Jackson (NZL) def. Fredj Chtiqui (TUN), RSC-2

=== Second round ===
- Robert Dauer (AUS) def. Frans van Bronckhorst (INA), 5:0
- Mike McCallum (JAM) def. Damdinjavyn Bandi (MGL), 5:0
- Reinhard Skricek (FRG) def. José Vallejo (DOM), 5:0
- Luigi Minchillo (ITA) def. Vitalis Bbegge (UGA), walk-over
- Clinton Jackson (USA) def. Zbigniew Kicka (POL), 5:0
- Wesly Felix (HAI) def. Vincent Dabire (BUR), walk-over
- Pedro Gamarro (VEN) def. Marijan Beneš (YUG), 5:0
- Emilio Correa (CUB) def. Plamen Yankov (BUL), RSC-2
- Ib Boetcher (DEN) def. Charles Mutti (ZAM), walk-over
- Carlos Santos (PUR) def. Carlos Mejia (COL), 5:0
- Victor Zilberman (ROM) def. Amon Kotey (GHA), walk-over
- Colin Jones (GBR) def. Christy McLoughlin (IRL), 5:0
- Carmen Rinke (CAN) def. Kenneth Bristol (GUY), walk-over
- Yoshioki Seki (JPN) def. Ju Seok-Kim (KOR), DSQ-1
- Jochen Bachfeld (GDR) def. Athanasios Iliadis (GRE), 5:0
- Valeri Rachkov (URS) def. David Jackson (NZL), 5:0

=== Third round ===
- Mike McCallum (JAM) def. Robert Dauer (AUS), 5:0
- Reinhard Skricek (FRG) def. Luigi Minchillo (ITA), 5:0
- Clinton Jackson (USA) def. Wesly Felix (HAI), KO-1
- Pedro Gamarro (VEN) def. Emilio Correa (CUB), RSC-3
- Carlos Santos (PUR) def. Ib Boetcher (DEN), 5:0
- Victor Zilberman (ROM) def. Colin Jones (GBR), 5:0
- Carmen Rinke (CAN) def. Yoshioki Seki (JPN), 4:1
- Jochen Bachfeld (GDR) def. Valeri Rachkov (URS), 4:1

=== Quarterfinals ===
- Reinhard Skricek (FRG) def. Mike McCallum (JAM), 3:2
- Pedro Gamarro (VEN) def. Clinton Jackson (USA), 3:2
- Victor Zilberman (ROM) def. Carlos Santos (PUR), 3:2
- Jochen Bachfeld (GDR) def. Carmen Rinke (CAN), 5:0

=== Semifinals ===
- Pedro Gamarro (VEN) def. Reinhard Skricek (FRG), RSC-3
- Jochen Bachfeld (GDR) def. Victor Zilberman (ROM), 3:2

=== Final ===
- Jochen Bachfeld (GDR) def. Pedro Gamarro (VEN), 3:2
