= Marvin Hagler vs. John Mugabi =

Boxing match

The Fights: Hagler vs. Mugabi
- Date: March 10, 1986
- Venue: Caesars Palace, Paradise, Nevada, U.S.
- Title(s) on the line: WBA, WBC, IBF and The Ring middleweight titles

Tale of the tape
Boxer	Marvin Hagler	John Mugabi
Nickname	Marvelous	The Beast
Hometown	Brockton, Massachusetts, U.S.	Kampala, Uganda
Purse	$2,500,000	$800,000
Pre-fight record	61–2–2 (51 KO)	25–0 (25 KO)
Age	31 years, 9 months	26 years
Height	5 ft 8 in (173 cm)	5 ft 8 1/2 in (174 cm)
Weight	159 1/2 lb (72 kg)	154 lb (70 kg)
Style	Southpaw	Orthodox
Recognition	WBA, WBC, IBF and The Ring undisputed Middleweight Champion	WBA/WBC/IBF/The Ring; No. 1 Ranked Middleweight

Result
- Hagler wins via 11th-round knockout

Marvin Hagler vs. John Mugabi was a professional boxing match contested on March 10, 1986, for the WBA, WBC and IBF middleweight titles. Along with Thomas Hearns vs. James Shuler, the bout co-main evented a boxing event billed as The Fights!

== Background ==
Coming off arguably the biggest victory of his career over Thomas Hearns on April 15, 1985, it was officially announced in July that both Hagler and Hearns would both compete in separate fights on a boxing card dubbed The Fights! Hagler would defend his undisputed middleweight title against undefeated knockout artist John Mugabi, while Hearns, who still held the WBC super welterweight title, would temporarily remain in the middleweight division to challenge James Shuler for the NABF middleweight title. At the time, Mugabi (ranked the number-one super welterweight by the WBC) and Shuler (the number-one ranked middleweight by the WBA) had been Hagler and Hearns' respective mandatory challengers for the respective titles they both held, but Mugabi decided to move up one weight class to challenge Hagler, while Shuler opted to bypass his title fight with Hagler and instead took $250,000 to face Hearns.

However, with Schuler stepping aside, the WBA than promoted the number-two middleweight contender James Kinchen and warned Hagler before his bout with Mugabi was official that they would refuse to sanction his fight with Mugabi and would strip him of their title if he didn't make his next title defense against their top-ranked middleweight challenger (originally Schuler, later Kinchen). With Hagler not wanting to give up his WBA title, Hagler's promoter Bob Arum met with then-WBA president Gilberto Mendoza in Venezuela and successfully convinced him to both keep Hagler as their champion and install Mugabi as their new number-one ranked middleweight.

In response to the WBA's ruling, Kinchen filed a lawsuit against Hagler, Arum and the WBA, claiming Hagler was violating WBA rules that required him to defend his title against the WBA's best available contender by July 15. Regarding his decision to take the matter to court, Kinchen explained "It's not that we want to get Marvin Hagler stripped, but we worked hard for a chance and we want the opportunity to fight for the title. I would rather fight Hagler in the ring than in court." After Kinchen named them in the lawsuit, the WBA did an about face and denied Hagler's request to designate Mugabi the number-one middleweight contender and announced that Kinchen would remain their top middleweight contender and once again reiterated that they would strip Hagler if he continued forward with his fight against Mugabi. Eventually, a compromise was reached where Kinchen agreed to drop the lawsuit and step aside in favor of joining Arum's promotional firm Top Rank, who in turn would set up two fights for Kinchen against top contenders. Kinchen, however, would lose both fights (first to Iran Barkley and then to Juan Roldán) and never fought for the middleweight title.

The event was originally scheduled to take place on November 14, 1985, but Hagler, who was also dealing with an injured back, suffered a broken nose after being headbutted by his sparring partner Zach Hewitt and the fight was indefinitely postponed as a result. Though there was discussions for the event to continue with the Shuler–Hearns fight taking the main event slot, but that fight was also postponed and it was officially announced in early November that both fights would be moved to March 10, 1986.

Hagler was a 3 to 1 favourite to win.

== Card Details ==
=== Shuler vs. Hearns ===
The co-featured bout saw WBC No. 1 ranked Middleweight James Shuler defend his NABF belt against WBC and The Ring Light middleweight champion Thomas Hearns, who was making his return to the ring following his war with Hagler.

==== The fight ====
Hearns would knock out Shuler out cold with a right cross to the chin in the first round.

==== Aftermath ====
Shuler died in a motorcycle accident in Philadelphia on 17 March, just one week after the bout. Hearns attended Shuler's funeral and attempted to present Shuler's parents with the NABF middleweight title he had won from Shuler, though the family declined the offer, stating that their son would not have wanted them to accept it.

Preceded by vs. Jerry Holly	James Shuler's bouts 10 March 1986	Died
Preceded by vs. Marvin Hagler	Thomas Hearns's bouts 10 March 1986	Succeeded by vs. Mark Medal

=== Hagler vs. Mugabi ===
Though Mugabi came into the fight as a fairly sizable underdog, he proved a game opponent for Hagler, giving the champion a tough fight and nearly closing his right eye towards the end of the fight. Hagler started off the fight using an orthodox stance rather than his traditional southpaw, but struggled mightily using the stance in the first round, losing the round on all three scorecards, and switched back to southpaw for the second round. Hagler controlled the fight with his jab, landing 184 during the course of the fight. Hagler had an especially effective sixth round, throwing 95 punches and connecting with 59. During the round, Hagler caught Mugabi flush to the head numerous times but was unable to score a knockdown. Also during the round, referee Mills Lane controversially stopped Hagler, who was in the midst of a multiple-punch combination, to admonish him for a low blow, eventually penalizing him one point for a low blow landed in the following round. The two fighters continued to trade heavy blows during the later rounds, with Mugabi recovering enough to take the ninth and tenth rounds on all but one scorecards. However, Mugabi seemed to tire during the 11th round and Hagler stunned him with a left hook just after the first minute into the round and then sent the dazed Mugabi to the canvas with consecutive right hands. Mugabi was able to sit up but was too exhausted to attempt to get back up as Lane counted him out, giving Hagler the knockout victory at 1:29 of the round.

== Fight card ==
Confirmed bouts:

Weight Class	Weight		vs.		Method	Round	Notes
Middleweight	160 lbs.	Marvin Hagler (c)	def.	John Mugabi	KO	11/12	^{note 1}
Middleweight	160 lbs.	Thomas Hearns	def.	James Shuler (c)	KO	1/12	^{note 2}
Bantamweight	118 lbs.	Gaby Canizales	def.	Richie Sandoval (c)	TKO	7/15	^{note 3}
Light Heavyweight	175 lbs.	Willie Edwards (c)	def.	David Sears	UD	12/12	^{note 4}
Middleweight	160 lbs.	Steve Darnell	def.	Israel Cole	UD	6/6

^Note 1 For WBA, WBC, IBF and The Ring Middleweight Titles
^Note 2 For NABF Middleweight Title
^Note 3 For WBA and The Ring Bantamweight Titles
^Note 4 For NABF Light Heavyweight Title

== Broadcasting ==
Country	Broadcaster
United States	Showtime

Preceded by vs. Thomas Hearns	Marvin Hagler's bouts 10 March 1986	Succeeded by vs. Ray Leonard
Preceded by vs. Bill Bradley	John Mugabi's bouts 10 March 1986	Succeeded by vs. Duane Thomas
Awards
Preceded by Marvin Hagler vs. Thomas Hearns	KO Magazine Fight of the Year; 1986	Next: Buster Drayton vs. Matthew Hilton
Preceded by Marvin Hagler vs. Thomas Hearns; Round 1	KO Magazine Round of the Year; Round 6; 1986	Next: Bobby Czyz vs. Charles Williams; Round 3
