= Reinhard Skricek =

German boxer

Olympic medal record

Men's Boxing
| Bronze medal – third place | 1976 Montreal | Welterweight |

Reinhard Skricek (born January 4, 1948) is a retired boxer from Germany, who represented West Germany (FRG) at the 1976 Summer Olympics in Montreal, Quebec, Canada. There he won the bronze medal in the welterweight division (– 67 kg) after being defeated in the semifinals by eventual silver medalist Pedro Gamarro of Venezuela.

== 1976 Olympic results ==
Below are the results of Reinhard Skricek, a welterweight boxer from West Germany who competed at the 1976 Montreal Olympics:

- Round of 64: bye
- Round of 32: Defeated José Vallejo (Dominican Republic) by decision, 5-0
- Round of 16: Defeated Luigi Minchillo (Italy) by decision 5-0
- Quarterfinal: Defeated Mike McCallum (Jamaica) by decision, 3-2
- Semifinal: Lost to Pedro Gamarro (Venezuela) referee stopped contest in the third round (was awarded bronze medal)
