= Jochen Bachfeld =

East German boxer (1952–2026)

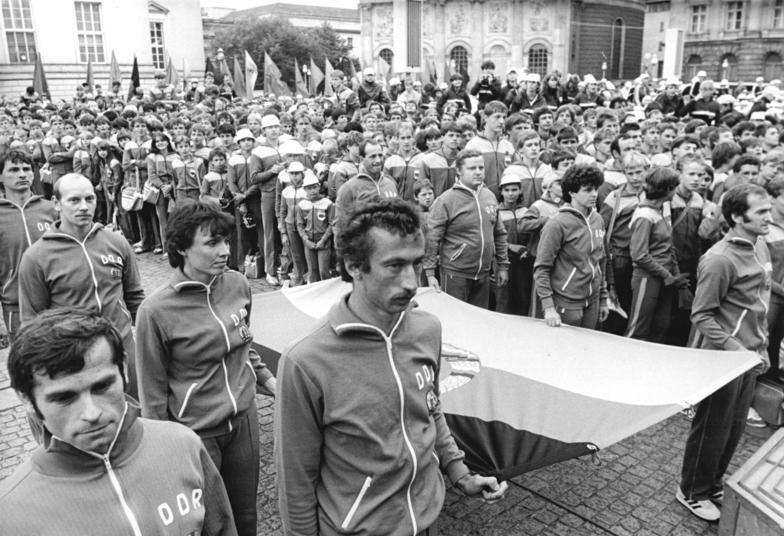
- Jochen Bachfeld (in the middle of the foreground) holding the East German flag during the 1985 East German Children and Youth Spartakiad

Personal information
- Nationality: East Germany
- Born: 17 December 1952 Sülte, East Germany
- Died: 12 March 2026 (aged 73)
- Height: 1.72 m (5 ft 8 in)
- Weight: 54 kg (119 lb)

Sport
- Sport: Boxing
- Weight class: Welterweight
- Club: Sportclub Traktor Schwerin
Medal record
Olympic Games
| Gold medal – first place | 1976 Montreal | Welterweight |

Jochen Bachfeld (17 December 1952 – 12 March 2026) was an East German Olympic champion boxer, who represented his native country at the 1976 Summer Olympics in Montreal, Canada. There, he won the gold medal in the welterweight division (– 67 kg) after defeating Pedro Gamarro of Venezuela in the final. Bachfeld died on 12 March 2026, at the age of 73.

== 1976 Olympic results ==
Below is the record of Jochen Bachfeld, an East German welterweight boxer who competed at the 1976 Montreal Olympics:

- Round of 64: Defeated Ali Bahri Khomani (Iran) referee stopped contest in first round
- Round of 32: Defeated Athanasios Iliadis (Greece) by decision, 5–0
- Round of 16: Defeated Valeri Rachkov (Soviet Union) by decision, 4–1
- Quarterfinal: Defeated Carmen Rinke (Canada) by decision, 5–0
- Semifinal: Defeated Victor Zilberman (Romania) by decision, 3–2
- Final: Defeated Pedro Gamarro (Venezuela) by decision, 3-2 (won gold medal)
