= Indonesia at the 1976 Summer Olympics =

- IOC code: INA
- NOC: Indonesian Olympic Committee

in Montreal, Quebec, Canada
- Competitors: 7 in 5 sports
- Flag bearer: Syamsul Anwar Harahap
- Medals: Gold 0 Silver 0 Bronze 0 Total 0

Summer Olympics appearances (overview)
- 1952; 1956; 1960; 1964; 1968; 1972; 1976; 1980; 1984; 1988; 1992; 1996; 2000; 2004; 2008; 2012; 2016; 2020; 2024

Indonesia competed at the 1976 Summer Olympics in Montreal, Quebec, Canada.

== Competitors ==
The following is the list of number of competitors participating in the Games:

Sport	Men	Women	Total
Archery	1	1	2
Athletics	0	1	1
Boxing	2	0	2
Swimming	1	0	1
Weightlifting	1	0	1
Total	5	2	7

== Archery ==
In Indonesia's second Olympic archery competition, one man and one woman competed. Only one point separated the scores of the two athletes, though the 2352 points that Leane Suniar received placed her far higher in the women's ranking than the 2353 points that counterpart Donald Pandiangan received placed him.

Women's Individual Competition

- Leane Suniar – 2352 points (→ 9th place)

Men's Individual Competition

- Donald Pandiangan – 2353 points (→ 19th place)

== Athletics ==
Key

- Note–Ranks given for track events are within the athlete's heat only
- Q = Qualified for the next round
- q = Qualified for the next round as a fastest loser or, in field events, by position without achieving the qualifying target
- NR = National record
- N/A = Round not applicable for the event
- Bye = Athlete not required to compete in round

Men's Track
Athlete	Event	Heat		Quarterfinal		Semifinal		Final	
Athlete	Event	Result	Rank	Result	Rank	Result	Rank	Result	Rank
Carolina Rieuwpassa	Women's 100 metres	11.98	7	Did not advance					
Carolina Rieuwpassa	Women's 200 metres	24.86	7	Did not advance					

== Boxing ==
Athlete	Event	Round of 64	Round of 32	Round of 16	Quarterfinals	Semifinals	Final	
Athlete	Event	Opposition Result	Opposition Result	Opposition Result	Opposition Result	Opposition Result	Opposition Result	Rank
Syamsul Anwar Harahap	Light welterweight	—N/a	Tahiru (GHA); W w/o	Cuțov (ROM); L 0–5	Did not advance			
Frans van Bronckhorst	Welterweight	—N/a	Dauer (AUS); L 0–5	Did not advance				

== Swimming ==
Athlete	Event	Heat		
Athlete	Event	Time	Rank	Note
Kris Sumono	Men's 100 metre freestyle	55.50	7 (Heat 2)	Did not advance
Kris Sumono	Men's 200 metre freestyle	02:01.12	7 (Heat 1)	Did not advance
Kris Sumono	Men's 400 metre freestyle	04:17.48	7 (Heat 2)	Did not advance
Kris Sumono	Men's 1500 metre freestyle	17:09.17	6 (Heat 2)	Did not advance

== Weightlifting ==
Athlete	Event	Snatch		Clean & jerk		Total	Rank
Athlete	Event	Result	Rank	Result	Rank	Total	Rank
Warino Lestanto	Lightweight	110	20	145	15	255	17

== See also ==
- 1976 Olympic Games
- 1976 Paralympic Games
- Indonesia at the Olympics
- Indonesia at the Paralympics
- Indonesia at the 1976 Summer Paralympics
