= Victor Zilberman =

Romanian boxer (born 1947)

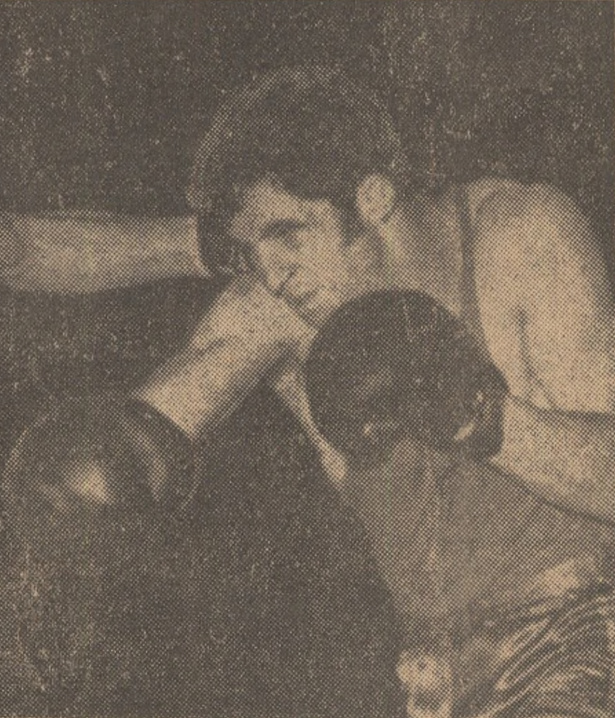

Personal information
- Nationality: Romanian
- Born: 20 September 1947 (age 78) Bucharest, Romania

Sport
- Sport: Boxing
Medal record
Representing Romania
Romania National Amateur Boxing Championships
Gold medal – first place	1968 Bucharest	Welterweight
Gold medal – first place	1969 Bucharest	Welterweight
Gold medal – first place	1970 Bucharest	Welterweight
Gold medal – first place	1971 Bucharest	Welterweight
Gold medal – first place	1972 Bucharest	Welterweight
Gold medal – first place	1973 Cluj	Welterweight
Gold medal – first place	1974 Bucharest	Welterweight
Gold medal – first place	1975 Bucharest	Light middleweight
Olympic Games
Bronze medal – third place	1976 Montreal	Welterweight
European Amateur Championships
Silver medal – second place	1969 Bucharest	Welterweight
Silver medal – second place	1975 Katowice	Welterweight

Victor Zilberman (born 20 September 1947) is a retired boxer from Romania. He competed in three consecutive Summer Olympics, starting in 1968 (Mexico City). He also won 8 national senior titles and two silver medals at the European Amateur Boxing Championships.

Born in Bucharest, Zilberman had his best result at the 1976 Summer Olympics in Montreal. There he won a bronze medal in the welterweight division (– 67 kg) after being defeated in the semifinals by eventual winner Jochen Bachfeld of East Germany. After the competition, he defected to Canada.

Zilberman is Jewish. He is father of David Zilberman.

== Olympic results ==
1968: Mexico City (as a welterweight)

- Lost to Joseph Bessala (Cameroon) TKO 3 (quarterfinal match)

1972: Munich (as a welterweight)

- Round of 64: Lost to David Jackson (Uganda) by decision, 2–3

Montreal: 1976 (as a welterweight)

- Round of 64: bye
- Round of 32: Defeated Amon Kotey (Ghana) by walkover
- Round of 16: Defeated Colin Jones (Great Britain) by decision, 5–0
- Quarterfinal: Defeated Carlos Santos (Puerto Rico) by decision, 3–2
- Semifinal: Lost to Jochen Bachfeld (East Germany) by decision, 2-3 (won bronze medal)
