= Thomas Hearns vs. James Kinchen =

Boxing match

Superfights: Kinchen vs. Hearns
- Date: November 4, 1988
- Venue: Las Vegas Hilton, Winchester, Nevada, U.S.
- Title(s) on the line: NABF and inaugural WBO super middleweight titles

Tale of the tape
Boxer	James Kinchen	Thomas Hearns
Nickname	The Heat	The Hitman
Hometown	San Diego, California, U.S.	Detroit, Michigan, U.S.
Pre-fight record	43–4–2 (30 KO)	45–3 (38 KO)
Age	30 years, 8 months	30 years
Height	5 ft 9 1/2 in (177 cm)	6 ft 1 in (185 cm)
Weight	166 lb (75 kg)	165 1/2 lb (75 kg)
Style	Orthodox	Orthodox
Recognition	WBC/IBF; No. 2 Ranked Super Middleweight; WBA; No. 5 Ranked Super Middleweight; NABF super middleweight champion	WBA; No. 2 Ranked Super Middleweight; WBC; No. 3 Ranked Super Middleweight; IBF/The Ring; No. 3 Ranked Middleweight; 4–division world champion

Result
- Hearns wins via majority decision (116–112, 115–112, 114–114)

Thomas Hearns vs. James Kinchen was a professional boxing match contested on November 4, 1988, for the NABF and the inaugural WBO super middleweight titles.

== Background ==
Following his upset loss against Iran Barkley in June 1988, 4–division world champion looked to quickly rebound by challenging WBA super middleweight champion Fulgencio Obelmejias in an effort to win his fifth world title in a fifth different weight class. However, Obelmejias withdrew only weeks before the fight citing a rib injury and was replaced by James Kinchen.

The switch from Obelmejias to Kinchen briefly put Hearns quest for a fifth world title in doubt as Kinchen only held the lower-regarded NABF super middleweight title rather than a world title from the major sanctioning bodies. This was rectified when promoter Bob Arum announced two days before the fight that the newly formed World Boxing Organization would sanction the fight for their inaugural super middleweight title, although the WBO belt was not considered to be a major title for more than a decade.

Hearns was a 7 to 2 favorite.

== The fights ==
=== Hilton vs. Hines ===
The first of the world title bouts on the card saw IBF light middleweight champion Matthew Hilton face number 1 contender Robert Hines.

In round two, while stuck on the ropes and absorbing heavy punches from Hilton, Hines was hurt by a series of Hilton power shots, but was held up by the ropes, before being given a count by the referee. Late in the third, Hines was knocked down for the second time, by a flush overhand right which sent him down onto the canvas.

However, as Hilton wore out Hines was able to land his southpaw right jab with great greater frequency.

Hilton would be deducted a point in round eight for repeated low blows.

At the end of 12 rounds Hines would awarded a unanimous decision victory with scores of 116–110, 114–111 and 112–111.

=== Nunn vs. Roldán ===
The second title bout saw, IBF middleweight champion Michael Nunn making the first defence his title against number six ranked Juan Roldán, who had twice fought the world title.

Roldán was knocked down in the first round, and was knocked out by Nunn in the eighth round.

Preceded by vs. Frank Tate	Michael Nunn's bouts 4 November 1988	Succeeded by vs. Sumbu Kalambay
Preceded by vs. Hugo Corro	Juan Roldán's bouts 4 November 1988	Retired

=== Main Event ===
Though Hearns entered the fight as a sizable favorite over the virtually unknown Kinchen, Kinchen would prove to be a formidable opponent; having Hearns in trouble several times throughout the fight. Kinchen would score the fight's lone knockdown, doing so midway through the fourth round after landing consecutive overhand rights. After Hearns got back up and continued the fight, Kinchen would continue his assault forcing Hearns to clinch. Hearns would disregard referee Mills Lane's orders and had to be forcefully separated by Lane resulting in Lane taking a deducting a point from Hearns after the round. By the end of the fight's full 12 rounds, Hearns' right eye was nearly closed shut though two judges felt he had done enough to win, scoring the fight in his favor at 116–112 and 115–112 while the third had it even 114–114 giving Hearns the majority decision victory.

The Associated Press scored the bout 114–112 for Kinchen, UPI had it 114–113 for Kinchen, KO Magazine 114–113 for Hearns and Ring Magazine had it for 115–112 Hearns.

== Aftermath ==
In January 1989, promoter Bob Arum announced the long-awaited rematch between Hearns and reigning WBC super middleweight champion Ray Leonard.

== Fight card ==
Confirmed bouts:

Weight Class	Weight		vs.		Method	Round	Notes
Super Middleweight	168 lbs.	Thomas Hearns	def.	James Kinchen (c)	MD	12/12	^{Note 1}
Middleweight	160 lbs.	Michael Nunn (c)	def.	Juan Roldán	KO	8/12	^{Note 2}
Light Middleweight	154 lbs.	Robert Hines	def.	Matthew Hilton (c)	UD	12/12	^{Note 3}
Light Heavyweight	175 lbs.	Michael Moorer	def.	Glenn Kennedy	KO	1/10

^Note 1 For NABF and WBO Super Middlweight titles
^Note 2 For IBF Middleweight title
^Note 3 For IBF Light Middleweight title

== Broadcasting ==
Country	Broadcaster
United States	Showtime

Preceded by vs. Iran Barkley	Thomas Hearns's bouts 4 November 1988	Succeeded by vs. Sugar Ray Leonard II
Preceded by vs. Marvin Mack	James Kinchen's bouts 4 November 1988	Succeeded by vs. Christophe Tiozzo
