= Marvin Hagler vs. Thomas Hearns =

Boxing match

The War
- Date: April 15, 1985
- Venue: Caesars Palace, Paradise, Nevada, U.S.
- Title(s) on the line: WBA, WBC, IBF and The Ring undisputed middleweight titles

Tale of the tape
Boxer	Marvin Hagler	Thomas Hearns
Nickname	Marvelous	The Hitman
Hometown	Brockton, Massachusetts, U.S.	Detroit, Michigan, U.S.
Purse	$5,600,000	$5,400,000
Pre-fight record	60–2–2 (50 KO)	40–1 (34 KO)
Age	30 years, 10 months	26 years, 5 months
Height	5 ft 9 in (175 cm)	6 ft 1 in (185 cm)
Weight	159 1/4 lb (72 kg)	159 3/4 lb (72 kg)
Style	Orthodox	Orthodox
Recognition	WBA, WBC, IBF and The Ring undisputed Middleweight Champion	WBC and The Ring; Light Middleweight champion 2-division world champion

Result
- Hagler wins via 3rd-round TKO

Marvin Hagler vs. Thomas Hearns, billed as The Fight, (referred to afterwards as The War), was a professional boxing match contested on April 15, 1985, for the undisputed middleweight championship. The fight is considered to be the three greatest rounds in boxing history.

== Background ==
By 1985, "Marvelous" Marvin Hagler had been the undisputed champion of the middleweight division since September 27, 1980, after having been widely regarded as the No. 1 challenger for much of the late 1970s. His first two shots at the world middleweight title resulted in controversy: the first was an unpopular draw against then-champion Vito Antuofermo in 1979 (allowing Antuofermo to retain the title), and the second was a three-round technical knockout (TKO) of Alan Minter, in London, which led to a riot by Minter's fans. The hard road to the middleweight championship, however, may have helped motivate Hagler to remain dominant during his reign. Hagler was renowned for his conditioning and durability, suffering only one official knockdown in his career, against Juan Domingo Roldan, an incident Hagler always insisted should have been ruled a slip. By the time he fought Thomas Hearns, he had defended the title ten times, winning all but one by knockout; the sole Hagler defense that went the distance was a 15-round decision victory over Roberto Durán. Hagler was then approaching the middleweight record of 14 title defenses, held by Carlos Monzón.

When Hagler vs. Hearns took place, Hearns had recently moved up from the welterweight to the junior middleweight to the middleweight division. Hearns was regarded as one of the hardest punchers of all time, winning 30 of his first 32 bouts by knockout. In Hearns's first title shot in 1980, he scored a spectacular second-round knockout over WBA champion Pipino Cuevas. Hearns defended that title three times before meeting Sugar Ray Leonard in a thrilling fight dubbed "The Showdown." Hearns lost by technical knockout in the 14th round despite leading on all three scorecards. He then successfully campaigned at junior middleweight, winning the WBC title from Wilfred Benítez, and defeating Roberto Durán. Hearns defeated several middleweights during this period, including Marcos Geraldo by first-round knockout. Geraldo had gone the distance against both Leonard and Hagler.

Given the pair's renowned punching power and the way both men had won their respective fights coming into the bout, the matchup garnered significant media attention and fan interest around the world. It was held at the Caesars Palace hotel in Las Vegas, Nevada on April 15, 1985. In the United States and Puerto Rico, it was broadcast by HBO (in Puerto Rico, also by Wapa canal 4) with Barry Tompkins, Sugar Ray Leonard and Larry Merchant, while Curt Gowdy served as host. Al Michaels and Al Bernstein acted as commentators for the closed circuit television for Top Rank. In the UK the fight was shown on ITV with Reg Gutteridge and Donald Curry commentating.

Hearns received a massage before the fight, much to the chagrin of his trainer Emanuel Steward. In HBO's Legendary Nights: The Tale of Hagler-Hearns, Steward stated that he felt the massage weakened Hearns' legs during the fight and led him to adopt a more aggressive approach than he normally would have.

== The Fight ==
=== Round 1 ===
Hagler, normally a slow starter, stormed Hearns from the opening bell, landing with several brutal right hands, eventually pinning him to the ropes. Hearns threw his devastating right hand to Hagler's chin, stunning Hagler for a moment before Hagler was able to tie him up in a clinch. Seconds later, however, the two were trading power punches, with Hagler trying to get inside and to pin Hearns to the ropes again. In the process, he succeeded in stunning Hearns with a hard left hand. Hearns tied up Hagler again and tried to slow the pace by boxing rather than trading power punches with Hagler, who was still the aggressor. This lasted for only a moment, however. Before long the two once again started to trade power punches. (During these exchanges Hearns broke his right hand.) The slugfest continued for the better part of the next two and a half minutes as both fighters traded heavy blows with little regard for defense or pacing. Hagler developed a cut on his forehead but didn't slow as he pinned Hearns to the ropes and meted out more punishment, eventually hurting Hearns at the end of the round. Sportscaster Barry Tompkins, doing the blow-by-blow commentary for HBO's broadcast of the fight, yelled out, "This is still only the first round!" as the fighters traded heavy shots at round's end. Al Bernstein remarked, "Perhaps one of the best opening rounds in middleweight history!" It is considered by The Ring magazine to be the greatest round in boxing history, and it won round of the year honors for 1985. In a subsequent HBO broadcast featuring both Hagler and Hearns in studio commenting on the fight, Hearns revealed, "that first round took everything I had, man." When asked in the ring after the bout if he was hurt by Hearns' first right hand, a blow that caused him to step back and then fall into a clinch, Hagler commented, "He definitely tried to put the bomb on me... . He can punch... ." The scorecards were split with Reno judge Herb Santos scoring the round 10–9 for Hagler, along with U.K judge Harry Gibbs while Dick Young of California had Hearns ahead 10–9. It was described as a war zone for both fighters.

=== Round 2 ===
By the beginning of the second round, it looked as though Hearns had no legs under him, as he slowed the pace by boxing Hagler. Hearns stumbled several times as he attempted to move around the ring and change direction, prompting HBO commentator Sugar Ray Leonard to note, "I don't like the way Tommy's moving...a little rubbery-legged." In the studio broadcast of the fight, Hearns commented, "My legs were gone, man. Even before I came out to fight, my legs felt weak." Hagler experimented by switching to orthodox style for a moment, but switched back to southpaw, as he found more success countering Hearns' jab. By the end of the round, Hagler pinned Hearns to the ropes, successfully landing a volley of punches. The action in round two had slowed from the blistering pace of round one. Judges Herb Santos and Harry Gibbs again scored the round 10-9 for Hagler while judge Dick Young scored the round 10-9 for Hearns.

=== Third and final round ===
In round three, Hearns again tried to set the pace. About a minute into the round, the cut on Hagler's forehead inflicted in the first round opened up, resulting in a tremendous flow of blood down the middleweight champion's face. Referee Richard Steele halted the action to have the ringside physician examine Hagler. He informed Steele, "No the cut's not bothering his sight, let him go.” Facing the new threat of losing the fight via stoppage on cuts, Hagler attacked Hearns with the aggression of the first round. A tremendous overhand left to the head drove Hearns back to the ropes and dizzied him. Hearns backed away, smiling so as to suggest the punch had not hurt him. Hagler landed a hard right hook high on Hearns' head. The blow staggered Hearns, who awkwardly stumbled backwards into the ropes, Hagler running after him in hot pursuit. The champion smashed a vicious right hand to Hearns' chin. Hearns went limp and fell forward, as Hagler landed two uppercuts. As Hearns fell face first to the canvas, Sugar Ray Leonard yelled into his microphone "He's gone...he's gone!"

Hearns staggered to his feet at the count of nine, but he was unable to continue. Referee Steele stopped the bout as he held Hearns upright. The image of a blood-soaked Hagler being carried around the ring in victory by his handlers and Hearns being carried back to his corner in semi-consciousness remains to this day a graphic testimony of the intensity of "The War." It was widely regarded as the pinnacle of Marvin Hagler's career and cemented his legacy as one of the greatest middleweights of all time. At the time of the stoppage, judges Herb Santos and Harry Gibbs had Hagler ahead 20–18 while judge Dick Young had Hearns ahead 20–18.

== Aftermath ==
In the immediate aftermath of the fight, Donald Curry (who was working for British television) was highly critical of the loser. He said "Tommy fought the wrong fight. He should have started cautiously, lose the first couple of rounds. Don't get into a dogfight, but that's what he did. He got into a dogfight with Marvin and he lost."

British fight publication Boxing News called it "eight minutes of mayhem", while The Ring called the fight "the most electrifying eight minutes ever," and it won fight of the year for 1985, despite lasting only three rounds.

Referee: Richard Steele of Las Vegas, Nevada Judges: Herb Santos of Reno, Nevada, Harry Gibbs of Britain, Dick Young of California.

== Legacy ==
The fight is considered by some to be the greatest three rounds in boxing history, due to its constant action, drama, and violent back-and-forth exchanges. The first round in particular is considered by many as the greatest round in boxing history.

== Undercard ==
Confirmed bouts:

== Broadcasting ==
Country	Broadcaster
Mexico	Televisa
Philippines	MBS 4
United Kingdom	ITV
United States	HBO

Preceded by vs. Mustafa Hamsho	Marvin Hagler's bouts 15 April 1985	Succeeded by vs. John Mugabi
Preceded by vs. Fred Hutchings	Thomas Hearns's bouts 15 April 1985	Succeeded by vs. James Shuler
Awards
Preceded by Bobby Chacon vs. Cornelius Boza-Edwards II	The Ring Fight of the Year; 1985	Succeeded by Barry McGuigan vs. Steve Cruz
Preceded by Mark Medal vs. Carlos Santos	KO Magazine Fight of the Year; 1985	Next: Marvin Hagler vs. John Mugabi
Preceded by Juan Meza vs. Jaime Garza; Round 1	The Ring Round of the Year; Round 1; 1985	Succeeded by Barry McGuigan vs. Steve Cruz; Round 15
Preceded by Juan Meza vs. Jaime Garza; Round 1	KO Magazine Round of the Year; Round 1; 1985	Next: Marvin Hagler vs. John Mugabi; Round 6
