= Carlos Mejía =

Carlos Mejía may refer to:

- Carlos Mejia (equestrian) (1894–?), Mexican equestrian
- Carlos Mejía Godoy (born 1943), Nicaraguan musician
- Carlos Mejia (boxer) (born 1957), Colombian boxer
- Carlos Mejía (footballer, born 1991), Guatemalan football defender
- Carlos Will Mejía (born 1983), Honduran football attacking midfielder
- Carlos Mejía (footballer, born 2000), Honduran football midfielder
