= Rachkov =

Rachkov (Russian: Рачков) is a Russian male surname, its feminine counterpart is Rachkova. It may refer to

- Dimitar Rachkov (born 1972), Bulgarian actor and television host
- Konstantin Rachkov (born 1978), Russian rugby union player
- Valery Rachkov (born 1956), Soviet Olympic boxer
- Tatiana Rachkova (born 1973), Russian figure skater
