= Lucien Haime =

Surinamese boxer

Lucien Haime is a former boxer from Suriname, who competed in the welterweight (67 kg) division at the 1975 Pan American Games in Mexico City. Haime lost his opening bout to Kenny Bristol of Guyana by knockout in the second round.
