= Christy McLoughlin =

Irish boxer

Personal information
- Nationality: Irish
- Born: 2 November 1954 (age 70)

Sport
- Sport: Boxing

Christy McLoughlin (born 2 November 1954) is an Irish boxer. He competed in the men's welterweight event at the 1976 Summer Olympics.
