= Bob Arum =

American attorney and boxing promoter (born 1931)

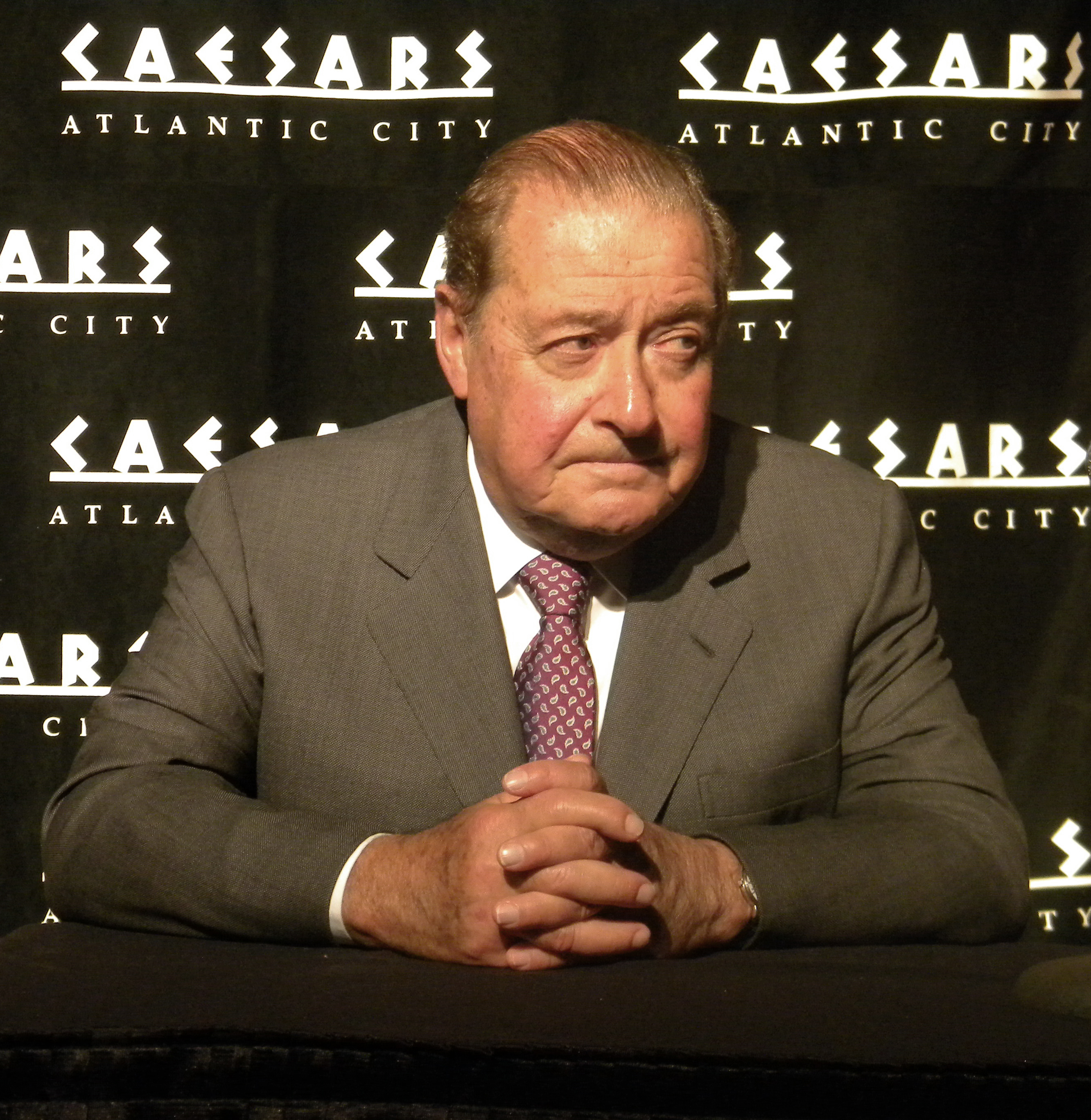
- Arum at Boardwalk Hall in Atlantic City, April 18, 2010
- Born: December 8, 1931 (age 94); New York City, US
- Education: New York University (BA); Harvard Law School (JD)
- Occupations: Lawyer; Boxing trainer Boxing promoter Boxing manager Businessman
- Years active: 1980 – present

Robert Arum (born December 8, 1931) is an American lawyer and boxing promoter. He is the founder and CEO of Top Rank, a professional boxing promotion company based in Las Vegas. Prior to becoming a boxing promoter, Arum was employed as an attorney in the tax division of the United States District Court for the Southern District of New York.

== Background and early life ==
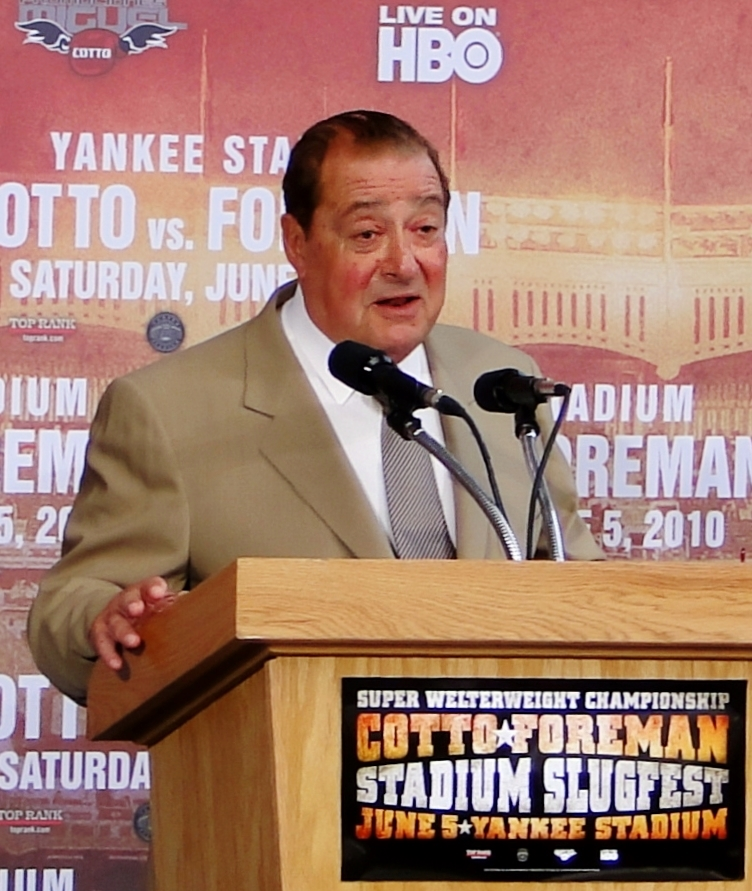
Bob Arum in 2010

Arum was born in the New York City borough of Brooklyn. He grew up in the Crown Heights section of New York, with an Orthodox Jewish background.

== Education and legal career ==
He attended Erasmus Hall High School, New York University, then Harvard Law School with fellow students recalled as "snooty guys from the prep schools and the eating clubs," where he was graduated cum laude. He worked as an attorney in the United States Department of Justice during the Kennedy administration, and had little interest in boxing until 1965.

Following the 1963 assassination of John F. Kennedy and his Justice Department service under Robert F. Kennedy; Arum joined Wall Street law firm Phillips, Nizer, Benjamin, Krim & Ballon, where he researched Kennedy's assassination for senior partner Louis Nizer, author of the foreword to the Warren Commission Report.

In 1963, as a prosecutor for the Department of Justice, Arum's work led to the indictment of the president of the Washington Heights Savings and Loan Association, Floyd Cramer, for leading a mortgage tax-evasion scheme. Cramer committed suicide hours after being indicted, at which time Arum recalled, "What kind of person causes another man to take his own life? I was ashamed. I knew then that I wasn't cut out to be a prosecutor". Arum continued to practice civil law until dissolving his office in 1979.

== Boxing promoter ==
In 1962, Arum was assigned by the Department of Justice to confiscate proceeds from the September 25, 1962 Floyd Patterson vs. Sonny Liston world heavyweight boxing title fight; during which he met closed-circuit television (CCTV) pioneer and former Leo Burnett & Co. vice-president Lester M. Malitz (1907 – July 24, 1965) of Lester M. Malitz Inc. Malitz was the promoter of the 1965 Terrell–Chuvalo bout, during which he retained Arum to represent him. In 1966, subsequent to a suggestion by Jim Brown, whom Arum had secured for Malitz as the fight's announcer, Arum became a boxing promoter. In 2016, Brown recalled that Arum had seen a televised fight in 1965, as "The first fight Arum ever saw was Terrell–Chuvalo, and he watched that from the television truck." Arum credits Brown with introducing him to Muhammad Ali, and Ali with teaching him how to be a boxing promoter.

Arum became a vice-president and secretary of Ali's promotion company, Main Bout. Mike Malitz, son of Lester, like Arum, owned 20 percent of the company and became its vice-president. Jim Brown owned 10 percent of the company and served as its vice-president in charge of publicity. Referencing his first live fight viewing, Arum was reported as saying that he "had never seen a boxing match before the first fight I did with Ali", referring to the 1966 Muhammad Ali vs. George Chuvalo bout.

During the 1980s, Arum became a driving force behind the sport, rivaling Don King. Arum organized superfights including Marvin Hagler vs. Roberto Durán and Marvin Hagler vs. Thomas Hearns. Arum mounted the Marvin Hagler vs. John Mugabi, Hearns–James Shuler doubleheader in Las Vegas in April 1986. After the Hearns–Shuler fight, Shuler, who had lost by knockout in the first round, showed up at Arum's hotel room to thank him for the opportunity to fight Hearns. ten days after that bout, Shuler died in a motorcycle accident. In 1994, he tried to add basketball to his interests, joining forces with Fred Hofheinz and Louisiana politicians to purchase and relocate the Minnesota Timberwolves to New Orleans, but the deal was rejected.

Arum kept producing big-scale undercards and superfights, including the Hagler–Sugar Ray Leonard bout, the Sugar Ray Leonard vs. Thomas Hearns 1989 rematch, Evander Holyfield vs. George Foreman, and many others. Some of Arum's superstars from the 1990s include former world flyweight champion Michael Carbajal, six-division world champion Oscar De La Hoya, eight-division world champion Manny Pacquiao, and three-division world champion Erik Morales. Arum also promoted the legendary champion Julio César Chávez in his later years of boxing.

Arum has concentrated largely on promoting Hispanic fighters in recent years, citing surveys which show boxing is among the most popular sports within the Hispanic community. This strategy began after his success signing Roberto Durán and promoting Durán's comeback fight against Davey Moore, which demonstrated that he was not washed up after the 1980 "No más" fight. Next, he signed Julio César Chávez Jr. and Oscar De La Hoya. He has had great success with Puerto Rican Miguel Cotto, who won world titles at the 140, 147, 154, 160-pound weight divisions; Mexican-American Antonio Margarito, who held a 147-pound WBO belt from 2002 to 2007; Mexican-American José Ramírez, the former WBC and WBO light welterweight world champion; Honduran-American Teófimo López, the former lightweight world champion; and Mexican Óscar Valdez, the former WBC super featherweight world champion.

Arum has concentrated many of his shows in the Southwestern portion of the U.S., in cities with large Spanish-speaking populations. He is also the promoter of many of the cards on Telefutura, a Spanish language network. He later shifted over to Azteca América. In 2016, he put together an all-Hispanic undercard for Manny Pacquiao vs. Timothy Bradley III in protest of then-presidential candidate Donald Trump's statements on Mexican immigration.

Arum was inducted into the International Boxing Hall Of Fame in 1999. In 2003 he was inducted into the Southern California Jewish Sports Hall of Fame.

== Controversies ==
As a boxing promoter, Arum had been involved in many spats and controversies, including a 40-year feud with Don King, with whom he has co-promoted several fights. UFC president Dana White has also been a vocal critic and the two have engaged in a protracted and acerbic public feud; in 2018, White briefly became a rival boxing promoter.

In 1994, he was involved with John Daly for the High Noon in Hong Kong boxing event. The fights were called off at the last minute when Barry Hearn scuttled the bout by withdrawing his fighters, when no purses were forthcoming from Top Rank.

In 2000, citing extortion, Arum voluntarily testified to having paid IBF president Robert W. "Bobby" Lee Sr. $100,000 in two installments in 1995, as the first half of a $200,000 bribe, through "middleman, Stanley Hoffman", adding that Lee had first demanded $500,000 to approve the Schulz–Foreman fight but had settled for the lesser amount of $200,000 (half of which was never paid). Lee was indicted for racketeering in 1999, but convicted of money laundering and tax evasion in 2000. Following his testimony, Arum was sanctioned and fined $125,000 by the Nevada Athletic Commission. Boxing promoters Cedric Kushner and Dino Duva also admitted to making similar payments to Lee.

Oscar De La Hoya successfully sued Arum and was legally released from his contract with Top Rank in January 2001. Following years of acrimony, he and De La Hoya publicly salvaged their relationship in 2014.

In 2003, Arum complained about judging in the September 13 bout between Oscar De La Hoya and Sugar Shane Mosley and suggested there was a vendetta against him from a member of the Nevada Athletic Commission that led to De La Hoya's loss. Arum later made an apology for the remark which commission chairman Luther Mack accepted.

In the first week of January 2004, FBI agents raided Arum's Top Rank office in Las Vegas. Arum was on vacation when his office was raided and the FBI originally declined to comment on the raid. The news media reported that the FBI was investigating allegations that Top Rank was involved in fixing the rematch between De La Hoya and Shane Mosley, even though De La Hoya lost and Arum was De La Hoya's promoter. The federal agency also announced it was investigating some of Eric Esch's fights, as well as the Jorge Páez–Verdell Smith fight. The investigation closed in the summer of 2006 with no charges being filed.

In 2007, Yahoo Sports reported that, "Floyd Mayweather Jr. essentially accused Arum, who promoted him from the beginning of his career in 1996 until 2006, of underpaying him, exploiting his talents and manipulating officials." Mayweather, who also became a boxing promoter, stated to Yahoo Sports in 2015, "I don't have anything bad to say about Bob Arum."

Arum filed a lawsuit against HBO for overstepping its boundaries in the sport by becoming a de facto promoter while trying to intentionally eliminate him as a promoter. Arum complained that HBO dropped Mayweather from his exclusive deal after he insisted his fighter have a tougher bout than the network wanted. The suit was settled out of court but Arum continued to criticize HBO by saying "Instead of working with promoters, like they have done in the past, they have become promoters themselves. They make the fights just like promoters and pay fighters", Arum said. "It's their money and they can do what they want but Don King doesn't have to go along with it and neither do I. King and I can get along without HBO or Showtime ... The problem HBO Sports got into is they became defenders of the status quo. They held you back because they had control."

In 2009, Arum defended Antonio Margarito when he lost his boxing license in the US state of California on charges of illegal hand wraps, implying that it was racially motivated and stating that Top Rank would not come back to the state of California until the issue was rectified.

In 2020, Arum stated that one of his top boxers, Terence Crawford should also start promoting himself better. He compared his situation with several other greats in the sport. Arum stated he could have built a house in Beverly Hills with the money he lost on Crawford's last three fights. Crawford did not take this lightly, responding through numerous media outlets showing his disappointment towards Arum's comments. In January 2022, Crawford sued Arum for racial bias and for the money he lost by not being promoted well enough.

== Personal life ==
Arum has been married twice. He had three children with his first wife: Richard, Lizabeth, and John. His son, environmental lawyer John Arum (1961–2010), fell to his death in 2010 while climbing the north face of Storm King, a mountain in North Cascades National Park; he is most remembered for his meticulous representation of Native American tribal rights.

In 1991, he married Lovee duBoef with whom he has two stepchildren; Todd duBoef, President of Top Rank and Dena duBoef, vice president of Top Rank. Arum was a close friend and business partner of the late billionaire casino tycoon, and CEO of Las Vegas Sands Corp, Sheldon Adelson.

Arum endorsed Democratic candidate Hillary Clinton in the run-up to the 2016 U.S. presidential election.

== Cannabis advocate ==
Arum, who appeared as corrupt DEA agent "Stokes" in the 1975 film The Marijuana Affair at the behest of his friend, Jamaican-born boxing promoter, filmmaker, bookie, and horse-racing aficionado Lucien Chen (June 6, 1928 – December 16, 2015), has advocated for the decriminalization of cannabis; and, in a 2017 interview, stated that he had started smoking it in 1966, declaring, "Cannabis is good for you! It's these damn people during the Nixon administration that really put cannabis into the position where it was a drug like heroin and cocaine and that was wrong" and adding that "in a lot of ways, marijuana is better for the athlete as pain medication than the drugs." In a 2017 VICE interview (which erroneously reports film producer Chen as Shen); Arum was also quoted as saying, "I think the NFL is gonna revise its policy on marijuana and I think everybody should. It was the Nixon administration that demonized marijuana, to the real harm of a lot of people, particularly people who have terminal cancer. Marijuana can be a very therapeutic thing."

== Film and television ==
Arum has appeared on several television documentaries, boxing specials, movies and shows, usually being interviewed about a boxer or fight but occasionally as an actor himself, including in Play It to the Bone (where he played a boxing fan) and Arliss.

== See also ==
- Boxing
- Floyd Mayweather Jr.
