= John Arum =

American environmental attorney (1961–2010)

John Arum (June 23, 1961 - August 28, 2010) was an American attorney active in the state of Washington. His primary areas of practice were environmental law and Native American law.

== Early life and education ==
Arum was born on June 23, 1961, in New York City. His father, Bob Arum, was a lawyer for the United States Department of Justice who later became a boxing promoter. Arum attended Reed College and studied law at the University of Washington, graduating with a J.D. in environmental law in 1990. While studying at Reed, Arum was involved in anti-nuclear activism against the Wah Chang Corporation.

== Career ==
After graduating, Arum joined a firm in Seattle specializing in Native American law. He quickly became involved in environmental lawsuits, representing the North Cascades Audubon Society in a lawsuit against the Port of Bellingham and the Federal Aviation Administration for disrupting eagle habitats. In 1992, Arum sued the United States Army Corps of Engineers, the United States Army, and the United States Environmental Protection Agency after they allowed an industrial park to begin construction in Burlington, Washington without an environmental mitigation plan. The suit claimed that the government had violated the Clean Water Act and that the construction was destructive to local wetlands, potentially harming the coho salmon population. The lawsuit, filed on behalf of a consortium of environmental groups, resulted in the construction permit being suspended pending an environmental review.

For several years in the late 1990s, Arum represented the Makah tribe in their fight to conduct legal whale hunts. The Makah had a right to hunt whales under an 1855 treaty, but animal rights groups sued to block the hunts. In 1995, Arum came under scrutiny after admitting to the National Oceanic and Atmospheric Administration that the Makah tribe had planned to sell whale meet and engage in commercial hunts. Arum was successful in securing the group a hunt in 1998 when Frank Burgess ruled that the hunt would not have an environmental impact. After one successful hunt, however, the Ninth Circuit Court of Appeals blocked future hunts pending environmental review. Arum continued to represent the tribe in their attempts to secure hunts but was not successful, securing a temporary win in 2002 before the ruling was again overturned later that year. He was an assistant attorney on the 1999 Supreme Court case Minnesota v. Mille Lacs Band of Chippewa Indians, which resulted in the Ojibwe people being granted treaty rights to fishing and hunting.

== Personal life and death ==
Arum was married to Susan Hormann. He was an active outdoorsman. In 1999 he was named an "Environmental Hero" by the Washington Environmental Council. Arum died on August 28, 2010, after falling from a slope in the North Cascades. His body was found five days later by a search team from the National Park Service. Before his death, Arum had asked Muhammad Ali to intervene on behalf of Josh Fattal and Shane Bauer, two hikers who were arrested in Iran and held on espionage charges. The two were eventually released in 2011.
