= Robert Hines (boxer) =

American boxer

Personal information
- Nickname: Bam Bam
- Born: March 28, 1961 (age 65) Philadelphia, Pennsylvania, U.S.
- Height: 5 ft 11 in (180 cm)
- Weight: Light middleweight

Boxing career
- Reach: 73 1/2 in (187 cm)
- Stance: Southpaw

Boxing record
- Total fights: 30
- Wins: 25
- Win by KO: 17
- Losses: 3
- Draws: 1
- No contests: 1

Robert Hines (born March 28, 1961, in Philadelphia, Pennsylvania), was a professional boxer in the light-middleweight division.

== Boxing career ==
Known as "Bam Bam", Hines turned pro in 1981 & compiled a record of 16-0 before losing to fellow Pennsylvanian Ricardo Bryant, via seventh round stoppage. He would rebound from this setback & go on to win the IBF light-middleweight title with a decision win over Matthew Hilton in 1988. He lost the belt in his first defense to Darrin Van Horn. He currently works as a trainer at the James Shuler Boxing Gym in Philadelphia. Rob also works as a trainer at 9Rounds off of City Line Ave.

== Professional boxing record ==
30 fights	25 wins	3 losses
By knockout	17	2
By decision	8	1
Draws	1	
No contests	1	

No.	Result	Record	Opponent	Type	Round, time	Date	Location	Notes
30	Loss	25–3–1 (1)	Brett Lally	TKO	4 (12)	25/06/1990	Harrah's Marina Resort, Atlantic City, New Jersey, U.S.	For vacant NABF light-middleweight title
29	Win	25–2–1 (1)	Salim Muhammad	TKO	2 (10)	20/11/1989	Pennsylvania Hall, Philadelphia, Pennsylvania, U.S.	
28	Loss	24–2–1 (1)	Darrin Van Horn	UD	12 (12)	05/02/1989	Trump Castle, Atlantic City, New Jersey, U.S.	Lost IBF light-middleweight title
27	Win	24–1–1 (1)	Matthew Hilton	UD	12 (12)	04/11/1988	Las Vegas Hilton, Winchester, Nevada, U.S.	Won IBF light-middleweight title
26	Win	23–1–1 (1)	Jose Laercio Bezerra de Lima	TKO	3 (8)	16/08/1988	Philadelphia Armory, Philadelphia, Pennsylvania, U.S.	
25	Win	22–1–1 (1)	Steve Little	UD	12 (12)	21/04/1988	Resorts Casino Hotel, Atlantic City, New Jersey, U.S.	Retained USBA light-middleweight title
24	Win	21–1–1 (1)	Tony Montgomery	TKO	10 (12)	23/10/1987	Resorts Casino Hotel, Atlantic City, New Jersey, U.S.	Won vacant USBA light-middleweight title
23	NC	20–1–1 (1)	Donald Bowers	NC	2 (10)	18/08/1987	The Blue Horizon, Philadelphia, Pennsylvania, U.S.	
22	Win	20–1–1	Anthony Wiley	TKO	5 (10)	01/06/1987	Pennsylvania Hall, Philadelphia, Pennsylvania, U.S.	
21	Win	19–1–1	Ismael Negron	KO	7 (10)	31/03/1987	The Blue Horizon, Philadelphia, Pennsylvania, U.S.	
20	Draw	18–1–1	James Green	SD	10 (10)	01/07/1985	Sands Casino Hotel, Atlantic City, New Jersey, U.S.	
19	Win	18–1	Kevin Howard	UD	10 (10)	08/04/1985	Sands Casino Hotel, Atlantic City, New Jersey, U.S.	
18	Loss	17–1	Ricardo Bryant	TKO	7 (10)	27/06/1984	Sands Casino Hotel, Atlantic City, New Jersey, U.S.	
17	Win	17–0	Dennis Fain	TKO	2 (10)	30/05/1984	Harrah's Marina Resort, Atlantic City, New Jersey, U.S.	
16	Win	16–0	Ramon Abeldano	TKO	7 (10)	22/01/1984	Sands Casino Hotel, Atlantic City, New Jersey, U.S.	
15	Win	15–0	Lanny Edmonds	TKO	7 (10)	17/09/1983	Sands Casino Hotel, Atlantic City, New Jersey, U.S.	
14	Win	14–0	Jake Torrance	UD	8 (8)	14/07/1983	Ice World, Totowa, New Jersey, U.S.	
13	Win	13–0	Eddie Campbell	TKO	3 (8)	26/05/1983	Sands Casino Hotel, Atlantic City, New Jersey, U.S.	
12	Win	12–0	JJ Cottrell	UD	8 (8)	19/02/1983	Showboat Hotel and Casino, Las Vegas, Nevada, U.S.	
11	Win	11–0	Richard House	KO	2 (8)	13/11/1982	Sands Casino Hotel, Atlantic City, New Jersey, U.S.	
10	Win	10–0	Luis Mateo	TKO	4 (8)	17/10/1982	Sands Casino Hotel, Atlantic City, New Jersey, U.S.	
9	Win	9–0	Tommy May	KO	4 (?)	25/09/1982	Great Gorge Resort, McAfee, New Jersey, U.S.	
8	Win	8–0	Sammy Rookard	TKO	1 (6)	19/07/1982	Bally's Park Place, Atlantic City, New Jersey, U.S.	
7	Win	7–0	Billy Hodge	TKO	1 (6)	24/06/1982	Resorts Casino Hotel, Atlantic City, New Jersey, U.S.	
6	Win	6–0	Larry Fleming	UD	6 (6)	02/03/1982	Tropicana Hotel & Casino, Atlantic City, New Jersey, U.S.	
5	Win	5–0	Teddy White	UD	6 (6)	22/12/1981	Sands Casino Hotel, Atlantic City, New Jersey, U.S.	
4	Win	4–0	Rocky Balboa	KO	1 (4)	07/11/1981	Hacienda, Paradise, Nevada, U.S.	
3	Win	3–0	Jose Green	KO	2 (?)	17/09/1981	Sands Casino Hotel, Atlantic City, New Jersey, U.S.	
2	Win	2–0	Ira Robinson	TKO	2 (4)	30/07/1981	Martin Luther King Arena, Philadelphia, Pennsylvania, U.S.	
1	Win	1–0	Ira Robinson	PTS	4 (4)	08/03/1981	Resorts Casino Hotel, Atlantic City, New Jersey, U.S.	

== See also ==
- List of southpaw stance boxers
- List of world light-middleweight boxing champions

Sporting positions
Regional boxing titles
Vacant Title last held by Donald Curry	USBA light-middleweight champion October 23, 1987 – November 4, 1988; Won world title	Vacant Title next held by Art Serwano
World boxing titles
Preceded by Matthew Hilton	IBF light-middleweight champion November 4, 1988 – February 5, 1989	Succeeded by Darrin Van Horn
