= Yoshifumi Seki =

Japanese boxer (born 1953)

Personal information
- Nationality: Japanese
- Born: 23 April 1953 (age 72)

Sport
- Sport: Boxing

Yoshifumi Seki (関 義文, Seki Yoshifumi; born 23 April 1953) is a Japanese boxer. He competed in the men's welterweight event at the 1976 Summer Olympics. At the 1976 Summer Olympics, he defeated Ju Seok-Kim of South Korea, before losing to Carmen Rinke of Canada.
