= Pedro Gamarro =

Venezuelan boxer (1955–2019)

Personal information
- Full name: Pedro José Gamarro
- Nationality: Venezuela
- Born: January 8, 1955 Machiques, Zulia
- Died: May 7, 2019 (aged 64) Maracaibo, Zulia
- Height: 1.78 m (5 ft 10 in)
- Weight: 67 kg (148 lb)

Sport
- Sport: Boxing
- Weight class: Welterweight
Medal record
Olympic Games
Silver medal – second place	1976 Montreal	Welterweight
Pan American Games
Bronze medal – third place	1975 Mexico City	Welterweight
Bronze medal – third place	1983 Caracas	Middleweight

Pedro Gamarro (January 8, 1955 – May 7, 2019) was a Venezuelan amateur boxer.

Gamarro represented his native country at the 1976 Summer Olympics in Montreal, Quebec, Canada. There, he won the silver medal in the welterweight division (– 67 kg) after having lost to Jochen Bachfeld of East Germany in the final. Gamarro's medal was the only one won by the South American nation in Montreal.

A year earlier, Gamarro had won a bronze medal at the 1975 Pan American Games. In between, he also won a bronze medal at the 1983 Pan American Games held in his home country.

Gamarro died in 2019 at the age of 64.

== 1976 Olympic results ==
Below are the results of Gamarro at the 1976 Montreal Olympics:

- Round of 64: Bye
- Round of 32: Defeated Marijan Beneš (Yugoslavia) by decision, 5–0
- Round of 16: Defeated Emilio Correa (Cuba), when referee stopped the contest in the third round
- Quarterfinal: Defeated Clint Jackson (United States) by decision, 3–2
- Semifinal: Defeated Reinhard Skricek (West Germany) by decision, 3–2
- Final: Lost to Jochen Bachfeld (East Germany) by decision, 2-3 (was awarded silver medal)
