= Carmen Rinke =

Canadian boxer

Carmen Rinke (born December 7, 1953, in Blairmore, Alberta) is a retired boxer from Canada, who represented his native country at the 1976 Summer Olympics. There he was defeated in the quarterfinals of the men's welterweight division (– 67 kilograms) by East Germany's eventual gold medalist Jochen Bachfeld. In the previous round, Rinke defeated Yoshifumi Seki of Japan.

== 1976 Olympic record ==
Below is the record of Carmen Rinke, a Canadian welterweight boxer who competed at the 1976 Montreal Olympics:

- Round of 64: bye
- Round of 32: defeated Kenny Bristol (Guyana) by walkover
- Round of 16: defeated Yoshifumi Seki (Japan) by decision, 4-1
- Quarterfinal: lost to Jochen Bachfeld (East Germany) by decision, 0-5
