= Kenny Bristol =

Guyanese boxer

Personal information
- Nationality: Guyanese
- Born: Kenny Bristol; 9 March 1952 (age 74) Guyana
- Weight: light middle/middleweight

Boxing career

Boxing record
- Total fights: 20
- Wins: 15 (KO 1)
- Losses: 5 (KO 1)

Kenny Bristol
Medal record
Men's Boxing
Representing Guyana
Pan American Games
Silver medal – second place	1975 Mexico City	Welterweight

Kenny Bristol (born March 9, 1952) is a Guyanese professional light middle/middleweight boxer of the 1970s and '80s who won the Commonwealth light middleweight title, his professional fighting weight varied from 153 1/4 lb (69.5 kg; 10 st 13.3 lb), i.e. light middleweight to 157 1/2 lb (71.4 kg; 11 st 3.5 lb), i.e. middleweight. Kenny Bristol won the 1976 New York Golden Gloves 160 lb Open Championship. Bristol defeated Guy Kennedy of the Madison Square Boys & Girls Club in the finals to win the Championship. Bristol trained at the Police Athletic League of New York City's Wynn Center in Brooklyn, New York where his trainer was former pro boxer Richie Hill.

Bristol won a silver medal at the 1975 Pan American Games in the welterweight division, defeating Lucien Haime of Suriname, Carlos Burga of Peru and Pedro Gamarro of Venezuela before losing to Clinton Jackson of the United States in the final.

Bristol lost an opportunity to compete in the 1976 Summer Olympics when Guyana boycotted the event.
