= David Jackson (New Zealand boxer) =

New Zealand boxer (1955–2004)

David Charles Jackson (4 March 1955, Wellington – 29 September 2004) was a boxer from New Zealand, who competed at the 1976 Summer Olympics in Montreal, where he was eliminated in the second round of the Welterweight (– 69 kg) division at the hands of Valery Rachkov from the Soviet Union. He also competed at two Commonwealth Games: in 1974 (Christchurch) and 1978 (Edmonton).

== 1976 Olympic results ==
Below are the results of David Jackson, a welterweight boxer from New Zealand who competed at the 1976 Montreal Olympics:

- Round of 64: defeated Fredj Chtioui (Tunisia) referee stopped contest in the second round
- Round of 32: lost to Valeri Rachkov (Soviet Union) on points, 0–5
