= Marijan Beneš =

Croatian-Yugoslav boxer

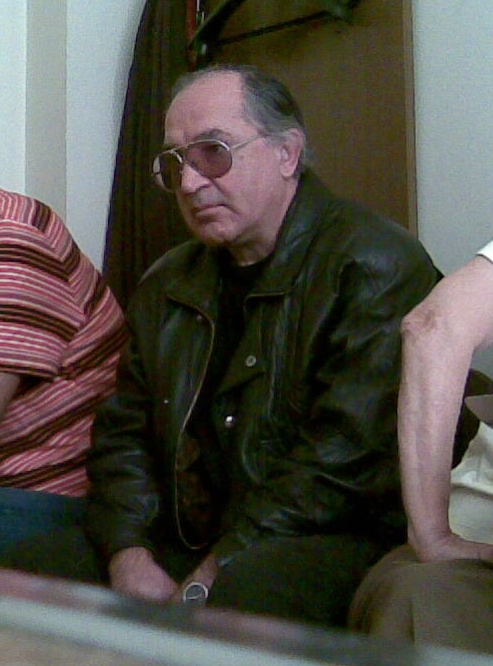
- Marijan Beneš in 2009

Personal information
- Nationality: Yugoslav → Bosnian
- Born: Marijan Beneš; 11 June 1951 Belgrade, PR Serbia, FPR Yugoslavia
- Died: 4 September 2018 (aged 67) Banja Luka, Bosnia and Herzegovina
- Weight: Light middleweight

Boxing career
- Stance: Orthodox

Boxing record
- Total fights: 39
- Wins: 32
- Losses: 6
- Draws: 1
Medal record
Men's Boxing
Representing Yugoslavia
European Amateur Boxing Championships
Gold medal – first place	1973 Belgrade	Light welterweight

Marijan Beneš (11 June 1951 – 4 September 2018) was a Yugoslavian boxer from Banja Luka, Bosnia and Herzegovina. He is considered one of the best boxers in Yugoslav history. After a brilliant amateur career, culminating in the gold medal in European Amateur Boxing Championships in Belgrade, he turned professional in 1977, and won the European Boxing Union title in the light welterweights in 1979. Next year he fought for the WBA World super welterweight title but lost to title holder Ayub Kalule on points. Beneš withdrew from the ring in 1983, after a severe eye injury. In 2020 he was named as the best Bosnian boxer in 20th century.

== Biography ==
Beneš was born in Belgrade to Croat father Josip and Serb mother Marija (née Vukić). Under the influence of his father, a music teacher, Beneš played piano and violin in his childhood. He had three brothers and one sister. He spent his childhood in Tuzla. Marijan was one of the famous four Beneš brothers (Antun, Ivica, Josip, Marijan) that competed for Sloboda Tuzla. His life took a radical turn when he (allegedly) entered the ring in Tuzla at the age of 10 and won against an 18-year-old opponent. His first coaches were Bego Huseljić and Miloš Todorović. When he was 16, he left Bokserski klub Sloboda Tuzla and joined Bokserski klub Slavija in Banja Luka, where he would stay during his entire amateur career.

Beneš described himself as being staunchly opposed to "Greater Serbs" and "Greater Croats", maintaining a Yugoslav identity.

=== Career ===
During his amateur career, Beneš won nine titles in Bosnia, four titles of Yugoslav champion, and a number of other competitions. In 1973, he won the European title in light welterweight in Belgrade and he received the "Golden Badge", an award for the Best Athlete of the year in Yugoslavia. Soon after he caught hepatitis, which could have meant the end of the career. "Radically stubborn" (as he said himself), and devoted to boxing, he decided to continue. He also participated in the 1976 Montreal Olympics, but lost in the second round.

=== Highlights ===
(gold) 1973 European championships, Belgrade, Yugoslavia,Light welterweight
- 1/8: Defeated Neville Cole (England) TKO 2
- 1/4: Defeated Paul Dobrescu (Romania) TKO 2
- 1/2: Defeated Ulrich Beyer (East Germany) TKOI 2
- Finals: Defeated Anatoli Kamnev (Soviet Union) TKOI 2

(gold) 1973 Balkan Championships, Athens, Greece Light welterweight

- 1/2: Defeated Calistrat Cutov (Romania) 3:2
- Finals: Defeated Athanasios Iliadis (Greece) 5:0

(gold) 1976 Balkan Championships, Zagreb, Yugoslavia Welterweight

- 1/4: Defeated Sabahattin Burcu (Turkey) 5:0
- 1/2: Defeated Viktor Tushev (Bulgaria) 5:0
- Finals: Defeated Vasile Cicu (Romania) 5:0

He turned professional in 1977, rising quickly to the European top. On 17 March 1979, in his hometown Banja Luka, he won the EBU title knocking down the defender, French boxer Gilbert Cohen, in the fourth round. He defended the title successfully four times, and lost on points in 1980 to then WBA world junior middleweight champion Ayub Kalule, for the WBA's world championship in a match regarded as one of toughest in Denmark ever. He eventually lost the EBU crown to Louis Acaries in 1981.

A severe injury of his left eye effectively sealed his career. It is not exactly known which match caused it; by one account, it was a match with Luigi Minchillo in 1983, and by another, it originated from the 1979 match with Sandy Torres in Zenica, and the condition worsened since. During the career, he had a number of other injuries: 26 bone fractures and damaged vocal cords, that caused him to speak quietly and slowly. He withdrew from the ring in 1983, fighting only two more exhibition matches in 1990s. The ring injury eventually left Beneš blind in his left eye.

=== After boxing and death ===
Beneš's brother was killed in 1992, during the Bosnian War. Beneš also participated in the war. At the end of the war in 1995, he was forced to leave Banja Luka after a number of threats. He sold his possessions cheaply, and during the war he stayed in Medulin and Zagreb, in Croatia, in poverty. He divorced his wife Stana, who moved to Niš, Serbia, with their daughters Žanet and Marijana. As he put it, "everything turned around; people started hating each other overnight...there are great people, but the war helped me realize who is the real people and who is scum." He returned to Banja Luka in 1996, after the end of the war, continuing to live modestly. "I lived in Croatia, people respected me, but I'm used to the old friends".

In 2004, a documentary film of Beneš's life, titled Bio jednom jedan šampion (Once Upon a Time There Was a Champion) was recorded in the production of Independent Television Banja Luka. Despite modest ambitions, it toured all over the former Yugoslavia, and Beneš was frequent guest on promotions.

Beneš lived the rest of his life in Banja Luka under modest circumstances, mostly financed by his sister Ljiljana. He published a book of poems Druga strana medalje (Another Side of Coin), devoted to sports, and he said that he had written a dozen more, and that he planned to publish them. Despite regular physical activity and a healthy diet, his boxing career and advanced age caused some health complications. In 2017, Beneš had Alzheimer's disease and was a wheelchair user. He died on 4 September 2018 at the age of 67.

== Boxing record as a professional ==
32 Wins (21 knockouts, 11 decisions), 6 Losses (3 knockouts, 3 decisions), 1 Draw
Result	Record	Opponent	Type	Round	Date	Location	Notes
Win	--	Cliff McCourry	KO	2	02/02/1997	Požega, Croatia	
Win	9-2	(Italy) Salvatore Di Salvatore	TKO	5	03/05/1991	(Socialist Federal Republic of Yugoslavia) Banja Luka, Yugoslavia	
Win	25-14-2	(Belgium) Maurice Bufi	KO	6	02/12/1983	Hanns-Martin-Schleyer-Halle, Stuttgart, West Germany	
Loss	20-32-1	(United States) Johnny Heard	KO	1	16/04/1983	Salzburg, Austria	
Win	7-4	(France) Mbayo Wa Mbayo	RTD	6	31/03/1983	(Socialist Federal Republic of Yugoslavia) Split, Yugoslavia	
Win	11-3-1	(Wales) Darwin Brewster	PTS	10	27/01/1983	(Socialist Federal Republic of Yugoslavia) Rijeka, Yugoslavia	
Loss	39-2	(Italy) Luigi Minchillo	MD	12	28/10/1982	San Severo, Italy	For European light-middleweight title.
Win	7-4-2	(Canada) Gordie Lawson	KO	4	10/06/1982	(Socialist Federal Republic of Yugoslavia) Titograd, Yugoslavia	
Win	--	Tony Desroche	KO	2	09/03/1982	(Socialist Federal Republic of Yugoslavia) Sarajevo, Yugoslavia	
Win	14-11-3	(United States) Randy Milton	KO	1	19/12/1981	(Socialist Federal Republic of Yugoslavia) Split, Yugoslavia	
Win	15-5-2	(Austria) Franz Dorfer	TKO	4	06/11/1981	Vienna, Austria	
Win	8-2-4	(France) Andre Mongelema	PTS	10	18/09/1981	Vienna, Austria	
Loss	29-3	(France) Louis Acaries	PTS	12	19/03/1981	Paris, France	Lost European light-middleweight title.
Win	12-4-1	(Chile) Antonio Alejandro Garrido	TKO	9	09/02/1981	Vienna, Austria	
Win	32-14-4	(Puerto Rico) Sandy Torres	PTS	10	20/12/1980	(Socialist Federal Republic of Yugoslavia) Split, Yugoslavia	
Win	37-8-5	(France) Georges Warusfel	TKO	5	06/10/1980	Paris, France	Retained European light-middleweight title.
Loss	33-0	(Uganda) Ayub Kalule	UD	15	12/06/1980	Randers Hallen, Randers, Denmark	For WBA light-middleweight title.
Win	10-8-2	(United States) Freddie Boynton	KO	3	28/03/1980	Berlin, West Germany	
Draw	29-4-1	(Italy) Damiano Lassandro	PTS	12	13/02/1980	Pesaro, Italy	Retained European light-middleweight title.
Win	19-0-2	(Netherlands) Adrie Huussen	TKO	3	05/11/1979	Rotterdam Ahoy Sportpaleis, Rotterdam, Netherlands	Retained European light-middleweight title.
Loss	29-12-4	(Puerto Rico) Sandy Torres	TKO	6	25/08/1979	(Socialist Federal Republic of Yugoslavia) Zenica, Yugoslavia	
Win	26-0	(Spain) Andoni Amana	TKO	8	06/06/1979	Bilbao, Spain	Retained European light-middleweight title.
Win	23-13-1	(United States) Zip Castillo	KO	1	28/04/1979	(Socialist Federal Republic of Yugoslavia) Belgrade, Yugoslavia	
Win	20-2-1	(France) Gilbert Cohen	KO	4	17/03/1979	(Socialist Federal Republic of Yugoslavia) Banja Luka, Yugoslavia	Won European light-middleweight title.
Win	72-17-27	(Argentina) Everaldo Costa Azevedo	PTS	10	18/11/1978	Berlin, West Germany	
Win	68-5-4	(The Bahamas) Elisha Obed	PTS	10	02/09/1978	Berlin, West Germany	
Win	3-11	(United Kingdom) Tiger Quaye	PTS	8	29/05/1978	Rotterdam Ahoy Sportpaleis, Rotterdam, Netherlands	
Win	8-4-2	(United Kingdom) Peter "Cricket" Neal	KO	5	06/05/1978	Frankfurt, West Germany	
Win	3-10	(United Kingdom) Tiger Quaye	KO	1	07/04/1978	Berlin, West Germany	
Loss	2-10	(United Kingdom) Tiger Quaye	TKO	3	15/02/1978	Rotterdam Ahoy Sportpaleis, Rotterdam, Netherlands	
Win	28-7-3	(Saint Christopher-Nevis-Anguilla) Pat Thomas	PTS	8	16/01/1978	Rotterdam, Netherlands	
Win	12-8	(Zaire) Wa Bukasa	KO	3	16/12/1977	Vienna, Austria	
Win	21-7-1	(United Kingdom) Steve Angell	TKO	4	10/12/1977	Berlin, West Germany	
Win	19-5-1	(France) Alain Ruocco	PTS	8	18/11/1977	Vienna, Austria	
Win	10-8-2	(United Kingdom) Mick Minter	TKO	2	31/10/1977	Rotterdam Ahoy Sportpaleis, Rotterdam, Netherlands	
Win	23-32-4	(Scotland) Scottish John Smith	PTS	8	10/10/1977	Rotterdam Ahoy Sportpaleis, Rotterdam, Netherlands	
Win	--	(Tunisia) Rhida Hakima	KO	2	01/10/1977	Vienna, Austria	
Win	15-12-5	(France) Pascal Zito	PTS	6	24/09/1977	Vienna, Austria	
Win	31-11-4	(Luxembourg) Clement Tshinza	PTS	4	06/08/1977	Deutschlandhalle, Charlottenburg, West Germany	

== See also ==
- Mate Parlov

Awards
Preceded by Mate Parlov	(Socialist Federal Republic of Yugoslavia) The Best Athlete of Yugoslavia; 1973	Succeeded by Mate Parlov
