= Gilbert Cohen =

French boxer (1948–1999)

- Cohen celebrates winning the European super welterweight championship, 1978

Personal information
- Nickname: Gilbert the other Cohen
- Born: October 12, 1948 Tunis, Tunisia
- Died: June 13, 1999 (aged 50)
- Height: 1.66 m (5 ft 5 in)
- Weight: Super welterweight

Boxing career
- Stance: Orthdodox

Boxing record
- Total fights: 25
- Wins: 20
- Win by KO: 8
- Losses: 4
- Draws: 1

Gilbert Cohen (October 12, 1948 – June 13, 1999) was a Tunisian-born French boxer. He was European junior middleweight champion 1978–1979.

== Early life and amateur career ==
Gilbert Cohen was born to a Jewish family in Tunis, Tunisia. He came with his family in the early 1950s to France, settling in the Porte de Saint-Ouen district of Paris. He fought as an amateur in France before moving to Israel. He was in Israel for five years, served in the army and worked as a longshoreman and foundry man. Cohen found life in Israel hard, noting discrimination against North African Jews, and he eventually "got fed up" with the country. During his time there, he gained weight, reaching 200 pounds. He moved back to France, worked in a foundry, lost the extra weight and, at his father's urging, restarted boxing. After 100 amateur bouts, with a record of 92–8, he turned professional in 1976, under trainer Jean Bretonnel. Early in his professional boxing career he also worked buying and selling used furniture.

== Professional career ==
On November 21, 1978, he knocked out favorite Jimmy Batten to win the EBU European super welterweight title. Cohen was able to have a chance at the title only because Claude Martin (boxeur), who had previously beaten him in the French championship, had withdrawn from the match. He had an opportunity to defend his title against a lesser opponent but was offered 250,000 francs to defend against a much tougher opponent, Yugoslav Marjan Benes. He was knocked out by Benes in the fourth round in their bout in Zagreb, Yugoslavia. He had one further fight, losing a ten rounder in Madison Square Garden. He had 25 professional fights, winning 20, losing four, with one draw.

Cohen was one of the many talented North African Jewish fighters who came onto the boxing scene after World War II, including Robert Cohen, Max Cohen and Alphonse Halimi.

== Personal ==
Cohen grew up in Paris in a family of 11 children who lived in a three-bedroom apartment. His father served in the French Army during World War II, was captured by the Germans, escaped twice, and lost a leg during the war.

Cohen's goal in fighting was to make "real money;" he retired shortly after losing to Benes, having done so in his last three fights. In retirement he bought a restaurant on rue Marcadet in Paris.

== Titles in boxing ==
=== Regional/International titles ===
- European super welterweight champion (154 lbs)
