= Kim Ju-seok =

South Korean boxer (born 1954)

Personal information
- Nationality: South Korean
- Born: 22 January 1954 (age 72)

Sport
- Sport: Boxing

Kim Ju-seok (born 22 January 1954) is a South Korean boxer. He competed in the men's welterweight event at the 1976 Summer Olympics. At the 1976 Summer Olympics, he defeated Marcelino Garcia of the United States Virgin Islands, and then lost to Yoshioki Seki of Japan.
