= Carlos Mejia (boxer) =

Colombian boxer

Personal information
- Nationality: Colombian
- Born: 8 November 1957
- Died: 16 March 2020 (aged 62)

Sport
- Sport: Boxing

Carlos Mejia (8 November 1957 – 16 March 2020) was a Colombian boxer. He competed in the men's welterweight event at the 1976 Summer Olympics.
