= Kalevi Marjamaa =

Finnish boxer

Martti Kalevi Marjamaa (born January 29, 1953) is a retired male boxer from Finland, who represented his native country twice at the Summer Olympics: in 1976 and 1980.

Marjamaa was born in Nivala. He was nicknamed "Kalle" during his career. He is the brother-in-law of Finnish sprint athlete Helinä Laihorinne-Marjamaa.

== 1976 Olympic results ==
Below is the record of Kalevi Marjamaa, a Finnish welterweight boxer who competed at the 1976 Montreal Olympics:

- Round of 64: lost to Valeri Rachkov (Soviet Union) referee stopped contest in third round
