= Buster Drayton =

American boxer (1952–2022)

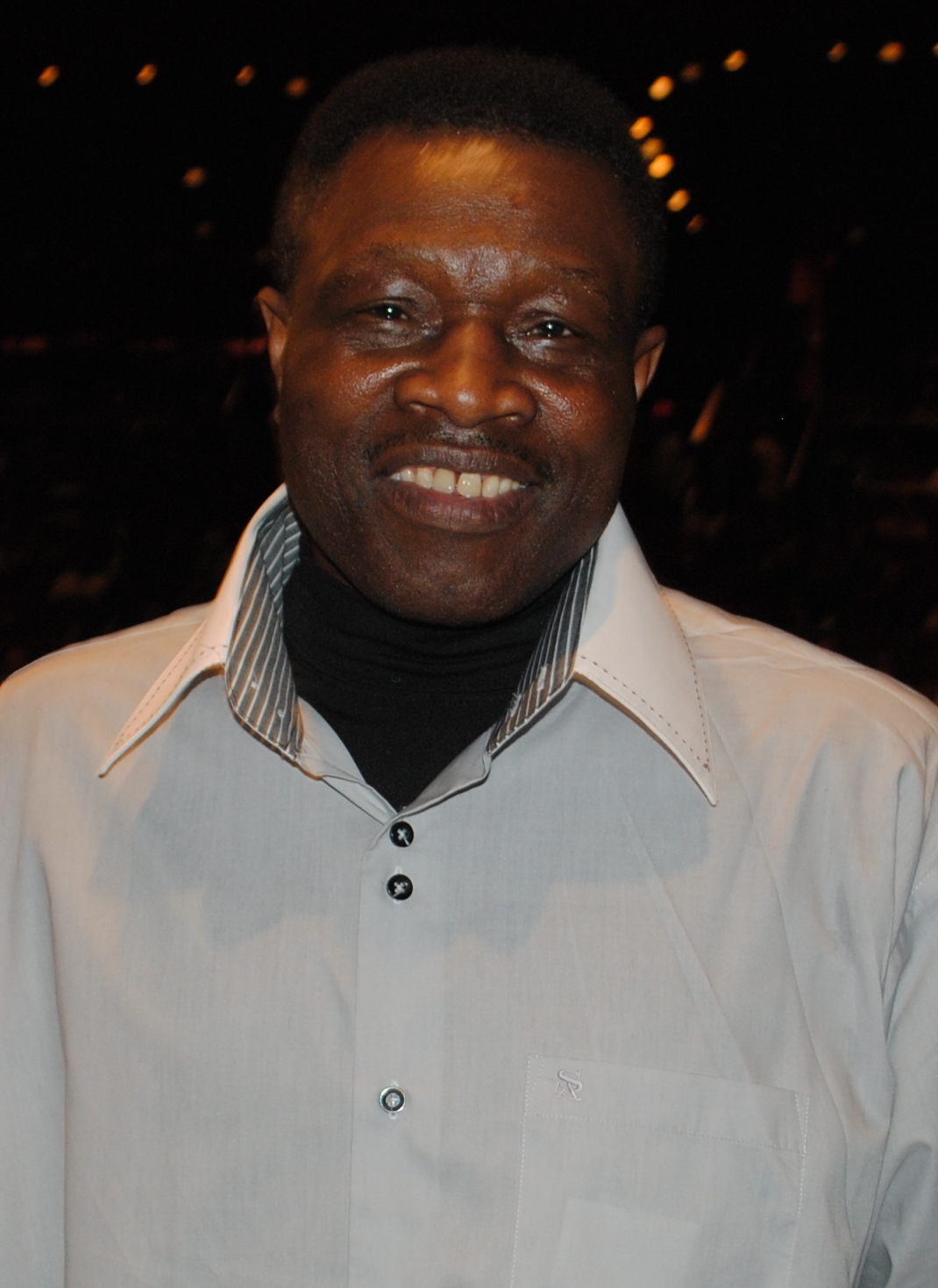
- Drayton at a fight card in 2012

Personal information
- Born: Moses Buster Drayton; March 2, 1952 Philadelphia, Pennsylvania, U.S.
- Died: November 20, 2022 (aged 70)
- Height: 5 ft 11 in (180 cm)
- Weight: Light middleweight; Middleweight

Boxing career
- Reach: 74 in (188 cm)
- Stance: Orthodox

Boxing record
- Total fights: 57
- Wins: 40
- Win by KO: 28
- Losses: 15
- Draws: 1
- No contests: 1

Moses Buster Drayton (March 2, 1952 – November 20, 2022) was an American boxer who won the IBF world title at light middleweight (154lb). Drayton turned pro in 1978 and won the vacant IBF light middleweight title with a decision win over Carlos Santos in 1986. He defended the belt twice before losing it to Matthew Hilton the following year. In 1988 he took on WBA light middleweight titleholder Julian Jackson, but was defeated via TKO in the third round. He retired in 1995 at the age of 43.

== Military service ==
Drayton joined the United States Marines during 1972, later rising to the rank of Sergeant. During 2016, he was honored for his service by the National Federation of Black Veterans.

== Return to the ring ==
Drayton returned to the ring in an exhibition in 2012. Drayton, aged 57, returned on January 28, 2012, in an exhibition in Philadelphia against former Philadelphia police officer Floyd 'Sugar Boy' Richards on the undercard of Dhafir Smith versus Quinton Rankin. Drayton and Richards both worked as Police Officers for the Department of Veterans Affairs at the Phila VA Medical Center.

== Personal life and death ==
Drayton died on November 20, 2022, at the age of 70.

== Professional boxing record ==
57 fights	40 wins	15 losses
By knockout	28	3
By decision	12	12
Draws	1	
No contests	1	

No.	Result	Record	Opponent	Type	Round, time	Date	Location	Notes
57	Loss	40–15–1 (1)	(United States) Derrick Rolon	UD	12	10 Jun 1995	(United States) Worcester, Massachusetts, U.S.	For IBF USBA North Atlantic Middleweight Title
56	Win	40–14–1 (1)	(United States) Jose Vera	PTS	6	3 Nov 1994	(United States) Salem, New Hampshire, U.S.	
55	Win	39–14–1 (1)	(United States) Robert Harris	TKO	4	14 Aug 1993	(United States) Old Orchard Beach, Maine, U.S.	
54	Win	38–14–1 (1)	(United States) Gary Smith	TKO	3	18 Nov 1992	(United States) Sanford, North Carolina, U.S.	
53	Win	37–14–1 (1)	(United States) Eric Mustafa Cole	TKO	8	26 Jun 1992	(United States) Lombardo's, Randolph, Massachusetts, U.S.	
52	Win	36–14–1 (1)	(United States) Jose Vera	PTS	8	22 May 1992	(United States) Oaks Banquet Hall, Agawam, Massachusetts, U.S.	
51	Loss	35–14–1 (1)	(United States) Eric Holland	UD	10	28 Aug 1991	(United States) Original Sports Bar, Philadelphia, Pennsylvania, U.S.	
50	Win	35–13–1 (1)	(United States) Gary Jones	UD	8	11 May 1991	Regina Agridome, Regina, Saskatchewan, Canada	
49	Loss	34–13–1 (1)	(Colombia) Brinatty Maquilon	TKO	8	5 Oct 1989	(United States) The Blue Horizon, Philadelphia, Pennsylvania, U.S.	
48	Win	34–12–1 (1)	(United States) Darryl Fromm	UD	10	28 Sep 1989	(United States) Finky's Country Showplace, Daytona Beach, Florida, U.S.	
47	Loss	33–12–1 (1)	(United States) Terry Norris	UD	12	28 Mar 1989	(United States) Showboat Hotel and Casino, Las Vegas, Nevada, U.S.	For NABF light-middleweight title
46	Loss	33–11–1 (1)	(United States Virgin Islands) Julian Jackson	TKO	3	30 Jul 1988	(United States) Harrah's Atlantic City, Atlantic City, New Jersey, U.S.	For WBA light-middleweight title
45	Win	33–10–1 (1)	(United States) Leroy Jones	TKO	4	5 Dec 1987	(United States) The Col Ballroom, Davenport, Iowa, U.S.	
44	Loss	32–10–1 (1)	(Canada) Matthew Hilton	UD	15	27 Jun 1987	Montreal Forum, Montreal, Quebec, Canada	Lost IBF light-middleweight title
43	Win	32–9–1 (1)	(France) Said Skouma	TKO	10	27 Mar 1987	Palais des Festivals et des Congrès, Cannes, France	Retained IBF light-middleweight title
42	Win	31–9–1 (1)	(Mexico) Juan Alonso Villa	KO	2	28 Feb 1987	Vincennes, France	
41	Win	30–9–1 (1)	(United States) Davey Moore	TKO	10	24 Aug 1986	La Pinede, Juan-les-Pins, France	Retained IBF light-middleweight title
40	Win	29–9–1 (1)	(United States) Benito Fernandez	TKO	6	20 Jun 1986	Paris, France	
39	Win	28–9–1 (1)	(Puerto Rico) Carlos Santos	MD	15	4 Jun 1986	(United States) Meadowlands Arena, East Rutherford, New Jersey, U.S.	Won IBF light-middleweight title
38	Win	27–9–1 (1)	(United States) Sam Leonard	TKO	5	4 Apr 1986	(United States) Caesars Atlantic City, Atlantic City, New Jersey, U.S.	
37	Win	26–9–1 (1)	(United States) Bruce Jackson	TKO	5	22 Jan 1986	(United States) Harrah's Atlantic City, Atlantic City, New Jersey, U.S.	
36	Win	25–9–1 (1)	(United States) John Jarvis	TKO	6	14 Sep 1985	(United States) Sands Atlantic City, Atlantic City, New Jersey, U.S.	
35	Win	24–9–1 (1)	(United States) Dennis Johnson	TKO	10	10 Jun 1985	(United States) Landmark Hotel, Metairie, Louisiana, U.S.	
34	Loss	23–9–1 (1)	(United States) James Kinchen	PTS	10	14 Apr 1985	(United Kingdom) York Hall, Bethnal Green, England, U.K.	
33	Win	23–8–1 (1)	(United States) Thomas Smith	UD	10	14 Feb 1985	(United States) Harrah's Atlantic City, Atlantic City, New Jersey, U.S.	
32	Win	22–8–1 (1)	(United States) Tony Harrison	TKO	10	28 Nov 1984	(United States) Harrah's Atlantic City, Atlantic City, New Jersey, U.S.	
31	Win	21–8–1 (1)	(United States) Terry Holmes	TKO	1	26 Sep 1984	(United States) Harrah's Atlantic City, Atlantic City, New Jersey, U.S.	
30	Win	20–8–1 (1)	(United States) Gary Coates	TKO	4	25 Jun 1984	(United States) Atlantic City, New Jersey, U.S.	
29	Win	19–8–1 (1)	(United Kingdom) Mark Kaylor	TKO	7	13 May 1984	(United Kingdom) Empire Pool, Wembley, England, U.K.	
28	Win	18–8–1 (1)	(United Kingdom) Jimmy Cable	KO	1	11 Apr 1984	(United Kingdom) Royal Albert Hall, Kensington, England, U.K.	
27	Win	17–8–1 (1)	(South Africa) Gregory Clark	TKO	2	28 Jan 1984	Ellis Park Tennis Stadium, Johannesburg, South Africa	
26	Loss	16–8–1 (1)	(United States) Fred Hutchings	PTS	10	2 Oct 1983	(United States) Alex G. Spanos Center, Stockton, California, U.S.	
52	Loss	16–7–1 (1)	(United States) Mario Maldonado	SD	10	1 Sep 1983	(United States) Resorts Casino Hotel, Atlantic City, New Jersey, U.S.	
24	Win	16–6–1 (1)	(Argentina) Patricio Diaz	PTS	10	9 Jun 1983	(United States) Resorts Casino Hotel, Atlantic City, New Jersey, U.S.	
23	Win	15–6–1 (1)	(United States) Clinton Jackson	TKO	2	12 May 1983	(United States) Viking Hall, Bristol, Tennessee, U.S.	
22	Win	14–6–1 (1)	(United States) David Plowden	UD	8	12 Apr 1983	(United States) Sheraton Hotel, Charleston, South Carolina, U.S.	
21	Loss	13–6–1 (1)	(South Africa) Bushy Bester	PTS	10	5 Feb 1983	Ellis Park Tennis Stadium, Johannesburg, South Africa	
20	Loss	13–5–1 (1)	(Italy) Sumbu Kalambay	PTS	8	30 Oct 1982	Teatro Ariston, Sanremo, Italy	
19	Win	13–4–1 (1)	(United States) Bruce Johnson	TKO	9	31 Jul 1982	(United States) Bally's Atlantic City, Atlantic City, New Jersey, U.S.	
18	Win	12–4–1 (1)	(United States) Duane Thomas	TKO	7	29 Apr 1982	(United States) Sands Atlantic City, Atlantic City, New Jersey, U.S.	
17	Loss	11–4–1 (1)	(United States) Lindell Holmes	PTS	10	7 Mar 1982	(United States) Bally's Atlantic City, Atlantic City, New Jersey, U.S.	
16	Win	11–3–1 (1)	(United States) Dan Snyder	PTS	8	17 Jan 1982	(United States) Tropicana Casino & Resort, Atlantic City, New Jersey, U.S.	
15	Win	10–3–1 (1)	(United States) DC Walker	KO	2	23 Dec 1981	(United States) Civic Center, Providence, Rhode Island, U.S.	
14	Win	9–3–1 (1)	(United States) Tyrone Demby	PTS	6	25 Jul 1981	(United States) Resorts Casino Hotel, Atlantic City, New Jersey, U.S.	
13	Loss	8–3–1 (1)	(United States) Mario Maldonado	PTS	8	14 Jun 1981	(United States) Sands Atlantic City, Atlantic City, New Jersey, U.S.	
12	Loss	8–2–1 (1)	(United States) Mark Holmes	UD	6	7 Feb 1981	(United States) Resorts Casino Hotel, Atlantic City, New Jersey, U.S.	
11	Win	8–1–1 (1)	(United States) Dan Snyder	TKO	4	24 Jan 1981	(United States) Martin Luther King Arena, Philadelphia, Pennsylvania, U.S.	
10	Loss	7–1–1 (1)	(United States) Kevin Perry	TKO	3	6 Nov 1980	(United States) Resorts Casino Hotel, Atlantic City, New Jersey, U.S.	
9	NC	7–0–1 (1)	(United States) Curtis Taylor	NC	8	1 Oct 1980	(United States) Resorts Casino Hotel, Atlantic City, New Jersey, U.S.	
8	Win	7–0–1	(United States) Bill Harrington	TKO	2	9 Aug 1980	(United States) Resorts Casino Hotel, Atlantic City, New Jersey, U.S.	
7	Win	6–0–1	(United States) Clifford Smith	TKO	1	18 Oct 1979	(United States) Convention Hall, Philadelphia, Pennsylvania, U.S.	
6	Win	5–0–1	(United States) Julius Spell	PTS	4	20 Sep 1979	(United States) Alan B. Shepard Civic Center, Virginia Beach, Virginia, U.S.	
5	Win	4–0–1	(United States) Jesse Carter	KO	6	30 Aug 1979	(United States) Alan B. Shepard Civic Center, Virginia Beach, Virginia, U.S.	
4	Win	3–0–1	(United States) Bob Saxton	TKO	1	3 Jul 1979	(United States) Steel Pier Arena, Atlantic City, New Jersey, U.S.	
3	Win	2–0–1	(United States) Frank Moore	KO	3	31 May 1979	(United States) Dome, Virginia Beach, Virginia, U.S.	
2	Win	1–0–1	(United States) Jesse Carter	PTS	6	14 Dec 1978	(United States) Dome, Virginia Beach, Virginia, U.S.	
1	Draw	0–0–1	(United States) Charles Carey	PTS	4	9 Nov 1978	(United States) Dome, Virginia Beach, Virginia, U.S.	

== See also ==
- List of world light-middleweight boxing champions

Sporting positions
World boxing titles
Vacant Title last held by Carlos Santos	IBF Light Middleweight champion June 4, 1986 – June 27, 1987	Succeeded by Matthew Hilton
