= Wesly Felix =

Haitian boxer (born 1947)

Wesly Felix (born 4 March 1947) is a former boxer from Haiti, who competed in the welterweight (- 67 kg) division at the 1976 Summer Olympics. Felix lost his opening bout to Clinton Jackson of the United States.
