= José Vallejo =

Dominican Republic boxer (born 1955)

Personal information
- Nationality: Dominican
- Born: 10 December 1955 (age 69)

Sport
- Sport: Boxing

José Vallejo (born 10 December 1955) is a Dominican Republic boxer. He competed in the men's welterweight event at the 1976 Summer Olympics.
