= Matthew Hilton (boxer) =

Canadian boxer

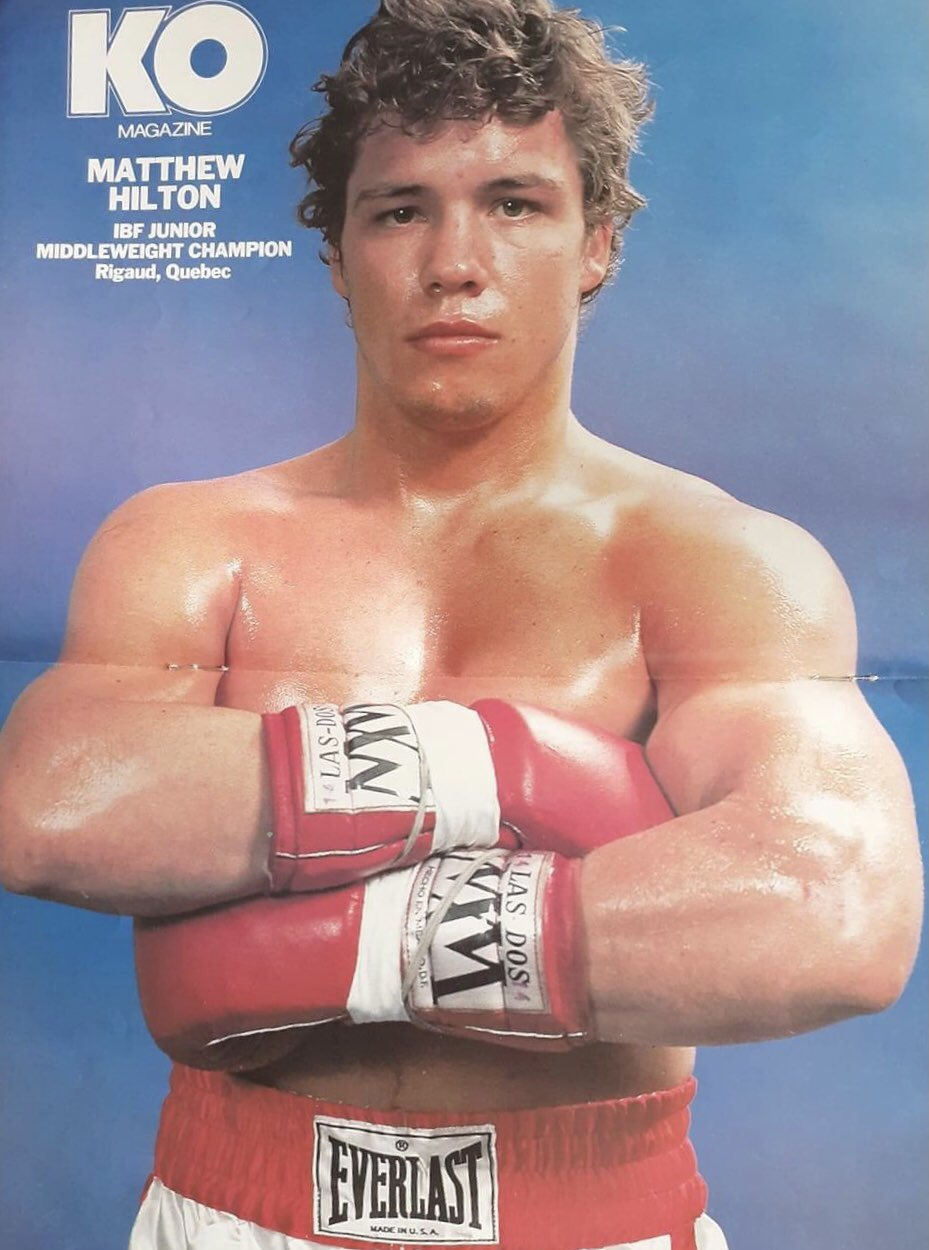
- Hilton in 1987

Personal information
- Born: December 27, 1965 (age 60) Montreal, Quebec, Canada
- Height: 5 ft 7 1/4 in (171 cm)
- Weight: Light middleweight; Middleweight

Boxing career
- Reach: 68 in (173 cm)
- Stance: Orthodox

Boxing record
- Total fights: 37
- Wins: 32
- Win by KO: 24
- Losses: 3
- Draws: 2

Matthew Hilton (born December 27, 1965) is a Canadian former boxer who was the IBF light-middleweight champion of the world. He is the younger brother of former super middleweight world champion, Dave Hilton Jr.

He started boxing professionally in early 1983, and while doing so lived a nomadic lifestyle (along with his father/trainer and other family members), moving from place to place in a 'movable trailer.'

== Fighting style ==
It was tough growing up for Hilton, but he transferred that toughness to the ring, at least as his career started. Though Matthew had decent boxing skills for a brawler, he preferred to press forward, back up his opponents, and detonate his punishing left hooks, and powerful overhand rights. Two of the big names he faced in his rise to stardom were former 3-time world champion Wilfred Benítez and former world middleweight champion Vito Antuofermo, who both fell victim to his devastating KO power. He won the IBF junior middleweight world title, and brought Canada its first world boxing title since the 1940s, with a 15-round unanimous decision over defender Buster Drayton on ABC in Montreal, June 27, 1987, which was also named KO Magazines TV Fight of the Year for 1987. He made one defense on the Tyson-Biggs undercard on HBO in October of that year, busting and bruising up a totally outclassed Jack Callahan before the referee called things off after two rounds. His next fight was an exciting non-title bout on ESPN in the middleweight division against Paul Whitaker of New Orleans, who was knocked down and brutally battered by Hilton before being KO'd in the fourth round. Matthew then apparently had the upper hand in the early going in his next defense - a November 1988 matchup with Robert Hines on Showtime.

After knocking a bloodied Hines down twice, he let Hines back in the fight, and Hines steadily hammered a very tired and not very well prepared Hilton in winning a come-from-behind 12-round unanimous decision, after which Hilton would be champ no more. Hilton admitted after the fight that he had sustained rib injury during training for that fight (Between rounds, Hilton could be heard telling his father that he couldn't throw his left hand). Matthew later rebounded with a lackluster (though controversial) draw against Fermin Chirino, a bout in which many felt that Matthew had won by a 10-round unanimous decision, followed by two more exciting bouts against journeyman Tim T. Williams (on ESPN), who was KO'd in round 10, and Tennessee toughman Knox Brown, who had only previously been down at the hands of John Mugabi, and was again floored by Hilton in a 10-round decision victory on the USA Network. His last crack at a title was on the Foreman–Cooney undercard in January 1990, when his eyes were again swollen shut by the punches of defending WBO middleweight world titlist Doug DeWitt.

== Injuries and retirement ==
This time, though he fought gamely against DeWitt, Hilton was the loser not by decision but rather by 11th-round TKO when his father had seen enough and did not let him fight the last round. Hilton's eyes were both swollen completely closed. His cutman only had ice to decrease the swelling, which was ineffective. Because of that fight, he suffered a retina injury which followed him for his next few fights before forcing him into retirement. Hilton received many unsuccessful surgeries for his eyes. His career began to sputter during the 1990s, and, partly due to the various troubles plaguing the Hilton family, Hilton never was really able to regain his championship-level caliber. He said he never was much motivated for training after he won the IBF's belt against Buster Drayton.

== Professional boxing record ==
37 fights	32 wins	3 losses
By knockout	24	1
By decision	8	2
Draws	2	

No.	Result	Record	Opponent	Type	Round, time	Date	Location	Notes
37	Loss	32–3–2	Darrell Flint	UD	10 (10)	27/05/1993	Halifax Forum, Halifax, Nova Scotia, Canada	
36	Draw	32–2–2	Kevin Daigle	SD	10 (10)	11/02/1992	Verdun, Quebec, Canada	
35	Win	32–2–1	Clarence White	UD	10 (10)	12/11/1991	Verdun Auditorium, Verdun, Quebec, Canada	
34	Win	31–2–1	Knox Brown	UD	10 (10)	31/07/1990	Northlands AgriCom, Edmonton, Alberta, Canada	
33	Loss	30–2–1	Doug DeWitt	RTD	11 (12)	15/01/1990	Boardwalk Hall, Atlantic City, New Jersey, U.S.	For WBO middleweight title
32	Draw	30–1–1	Fermin Chirino	SD	10 (10)	19/12/1989	Caesars, Atlantic City, New Jersey, U.S.	
31	Win	30–1	Tim Williams	TKO	10 (10)	10/10/1989	Bally's Las Vegas, Paradise, Nevada, U.S.	
30	Loss	29–1	Robert Hines	UD	12 (12)	04/11/1988	Las Vegas Hilton, Winchester, Nevada, U.S.	Lost IBF light-middleweight title
29	Win	29–0	Paul Whittaker	TKO	4 (10)	29/07/1988	Caesars Palace, Paradise, Nevada, U.S.	
28	Win	28–0	Jack Callahan	RTD	2 (15)	16/10/1987	Boardwalk Hall, Atlantic City, New Jersey, U.S.	Retained IBF light-middleweight title
27	Win	27–0	Buster Drayton	UD	15 (15)	27/06/1987	Montreal Forum, Montreal, Quebec, Canada	Won IBF light-middleweight title
26	Win	26–0	Muhammad Eltassi	TKO	2 (10)	29/04/1987	Paul Sauvé Arena, Montreal, Quebec, Canada	
25	Win	25–0	William Clayton	KO	2 (10)	12/12/1986	Madison Square Garden, New York City, New York, U.S.	
24	Win	24–0	Franklin Owens	TKO	2 (10)	22/11/1986	Las Vegas Hilton, Winchester, Nevada, U.S.	
23	Win	23–0	Aniseto Ramos	PTS	10 (10)	Jun 13, 1986	Madison Square Garden, New York City, New York, U.S.	
22	Win	22–0	Bobby McCorvey	KO	1 (10)	20/05/1986	Madison Square Garden, New York City, New York, U.S.	
21	Win	21–0	Bruce Jackson	RTD	5 (10)	19/04/1986	Las Vegas Hilton, Winchester, Nevada, U.S.	
20	Win	20–0	Wilfred Benítez	KO	9 (10)	15/02/1986	Paul Sauvé Arena, Montreal, Quebec, Canada	
19	Win	19–0	Vito Antuofermo	RTD	4 (10)	20/10/1985	Montreal Forum, Montreal, Quebec, Canada	
18	Win	18–0	Lopez McGee	TKO	4 (10)	06/09/1985	Tamiami Fairgrounds Auditorium, Miami, Florida, U.S.	
17	Win	17–0	Roberto Hernandez	TKO	9 (10)	29/04/1985	Buffalo Memorial Auditorium, Buffalo, New York, U.S.	
16	Win	16–0	Francisco De Jesus	UD	10 (10)	22/01/1985	Montreal Forum, Montreal, Quebec, Canada	
15	Win	15–0	Bill Bradley	RTD	3 (10)	11/12/1984	Paul Sauvé Arena, Montreal, Quebec, Canada	
14	Win	14–0	Sam Gervins	UD	10 (10)	14/10/1984	Montreal Forum, Montreal, Quebec, Canada	
13	Win	13–0	Ronald Thermidor	TKO	2 (10)	10/07/1984	Montreal Forum, Montreal, Quebec, Canada	
12	Win	12–0	Nino Gonzalez	KO	8 (10)	01/06/1984	Montreal Forum, Montreal, Quebec, Canada	
11	Win	11–0	Reggie Ford	TKO	1 (10)	30/04/1984	Hall de l'Exposition, Quebec City, Quebec, Canada	
10	Win	10–0	Eddie Hollett	TKO	5 (10)	04/12/1983	Montreal Forum, Montreal, Quebec, Canada	
9	Win	9–0	Hardy Jones	RTD	5 (8)	10/11/1983	Paul Sauvé Arena, Montreal, Quebec, Canada	
8	Win	8–0	Frank Mackey	TKO	3 (6)	23/08/1983	Le Carrefour Sports Centre, Laval, Quebec, Canada	
7	Win	7–0	Harold France	KO	3 (6)	29/07/1983	Cornwall, Ontario, Canada	
6	Win	6–0	Clinton Harris	KO	4 (6)	21/06/1983	Paul Sauvé Arena, Montreal, Quebec, Canada	
5	Win	5–0	Mike Essett	UD	6 (6)	24/05/1983	Paul Sauvé Arena, Montreal, Quebec, Canada	
4	Win	4–0	Jacques DeBlois	TKO	3 (4)	26/04/1983	Paul Sauvé Arena, Montreal, Quebec, Canada	
3	Win	3–0	Frank Minnigan	UD	4 (4)	29/03/1983	Paul Sauvé Arena, Montreal, Quebec, Canada	
2	Win	2–0	Adrian Green	TKO	3 (4)	15/02/1983	Paul Sauvé Arena, Montreal, Quebec, Canada	
1	Win	1–0	Denis Brisson	TKO	2 (4)	25/01/1983	Paul Sauvé Arena, Montreal, Quebec, Canada	

== See also ==
- Notable boxing families
- List of world light-middleweight boxing champions

Sporting positions
World boxing titles
Preceded by Buster Drayton	IBF light-middleweight champion June 27, 1987 – November 4, 1988	Succeeded by Robert Hines
Records
Preceded by Davey Moore; 22	Youngest light-middleweight champion 21; June 27, 1987 – February 5, 1989	Succeeded by Darrin Van Horn; 20
