= Clinton Jackson =

American boxer (born 1954)

Personal information
- Nickname: The Sheriff
- Born: May 20, 1954 (age 72) Evergreen, Alabama, U.S.

Boxing career
- Stance: Southpaw

Boxing record
- Total fights: 32
- Wins: 25
- Win by KO: 19
- Losses: 7
- Draws: 0
- No contests: 0
Medal record
Men's amateur boxing
Representing United States
Pan American Games
Gold medal – first place	1975 Mexico City	Welterweight

Clinton Jackson (born May 20, 1954) is an American former professional boxer. As an amateur, he competed in the 1976 Summer Olympics. He also won a silver medal at the 1974 World Championships and a gold at the 1975 Pan American Games.

== Biography ==
Born in Evergreen, Alabama, Jackson was an all-around athlete who played football and basketball in high school. He began boxing in 1970 when he walked into a gym in Pensacola, Florida. He lost to Emilio Correa in the gold medal match at the 1974 World Championships, but then defeated him en route to a gold medal at the 1975 Pan American Games.

He turned professional in 1979 but never achieved the results that he had as an amateur. He failed to win a fight against any significant opposition, and lost decisions to James Shuler, Sumbu Kalambay, and Buster Drayton. Jackson retired after a knockout win in October 1985.

In 1989, Jackson, a former sheriff's deputy, was convicted of kidnapping an Alabama banker in an extortion scheme, in which he demanded US$9,000. In 1992, an Associated Press article reported that Jackson was serving a life sentence in an Alabama prison inmate #00154880. According to Sports Illustrated, he was still serving a life sentence as of January 2015.

== Amateur highlights ==
- 1974 National AAU Welterweight Champion
- 1974 National Golden Gloves Welterweight Champion
- 1975 National AAU Welterweight Champion
- 1975 National Golden Gloves Welterweight Champion
- 1975 Pan American Games Welterweight Champion
- 1976 National AAU Welterweight Champion
- 1976 National Golden Gloves Welterweight Champion
- 1976 United States Olympic representative at Welterweight
- 1977 National AAU Light Middleweight champion
- 1978 National AAU Welterweight runner-up, losing to Roger Leonard.

=== 1976 Olympic results ===
Below are the results of Clinton Jackson, an American welterweight boxer who competed at the 1976 Montreal Olympics:

- Round of 32: Defeated (5–0) Zbigniew Kicka of Poland
- Round of 16: Defeated (KO 1) Wesly Felix of Haiti
- Quarterfinal: Lost (2–3) to Pedro Gamarro of Venezuela

Clinton Jackson had 221 amateur fights, finishing his amateur career with a record of 206 wins 15 losses. He soon turned professional, but also coached the Nashville Sheriff's Dept. celebrated boxing team.

== Professional record ==
25 Wins (19 knockouts, 6 decisions), 7 Losses (2 knockouts, 5 decisions)
Result	Record	Opponent	Type	Round	Date	Location	Notes
Win	2-14-1	(United States) Gary Jones	KO	3	04/10/1985	(United States) Kenosha, Wisconsin, U.S.	
Loss	17-0	(United States) Don Shiver	UD	10	07/03/1985	(United States) Egypt Shrine Temple, Tampa, Florida, U.S.	
Win	25-36-2	(United States) Johnny Heard	TKO	4	16/02/1985	(United States) VFW Hall, Dixon, Illinois, U.S.	
Loss	32-1-1	(Italy) Sumbu Kalambay	PTS	8	10/12/1984	Palais Omnisports de Paris-Bercy, Bercy, France	
Loss	10-23-2	(United States) Sammy Floyd	PTS	8	28/08/1984	(United States) Birmingham, Alabama, U.S.	
Loss	18-0	(United States) James Shuler	PTS	12	17/01/1984	(United States) Pennsylvania Hall, Philadelphia, Pennsylvania, U.S.	NABF Middleweight Title.
Loss	14-6-1	(United States) Buster Drayton	TKO	2	12/05/1983	(United States) Bristol, Tennessee, U.S.	Referee stopped the bout at 1:20 of the second round.
Win	23-15	(United States) Homer Jackson	KO	1	09/12/1982	(United States) Pensacola, Florida, U.S.	
Win	23-14-4	(United States) J.J. Cottrell	KO	10	30/11/1982	(United States) Showboat Hotel & Casino, Las Vegas, Nevada, U.S.	
Win	12-2-2	(United States) Wilbur Henderson	UD	10	04/11/1982	(United States) Sands Atlantic City, Atlantic City, New Jersey, U.S.	
Win	15-1	(United States) Robbie Sims	PTS	10	16/10/1982	(United States) Sands Atlantic City, Atlantic City, New Jersey, U.S.	
Win	1-4	(United States) James Coleman	KO	1	25/07/1982	(United States) Savannah, Georgia, U.S.	
Loss	14-2-1	(United States) Frank Fletcher	UD	12	20/06/1982	(United States) Sands Atlantic City, Atlantic City, New Jersey, U.S.	IBF USBA Middleweight Title.
Win	11-7-1	(United States) Al Clay	KO	1	07/04/1982	(United States) Nashville, Tennessee, U.S.	
Win	5-11	(United States) Willie Ray Taylor	KO	1	26/03/1982	(United States) Knoxville, Tennessee, U.S.	
Win	7-16-1	(United States) Clifford Wills	KO	4	10/03/1982	(United States) Nashville, Tennessee, U.S.	
Win	15-9-1	(United States) Mario Maldonado	KO	8	17/12/1981	(United States) Atlantic City, New Jersey, U.S.	
Win	2-7	(United States) Roosevelt Moss	KO	1	27/11/1981	(United States) Knoxville, Tennessee, U.S.	
Win	4-2	(United States) Bruce Thompson	KO	3	21/11/1981	(United States) Portland, Oregon, U.S.	
Win	13-4	(United States) Jerry Holly	UD	10	27/10/1981	(United States) Curtis Hixon Hall, Tampa, Florida, U.S.	
Win	6-1	(United States) Bruce Thompson	UD	10	08/09/1981	(United States) Curtis Hixon Hall, Tampa, Florida, U.S.	
Loss	7-0-1	(United States) Tony Braxton	TKO	9	07/05/1981	(United States) Playboy Hotel and Casino, Atlantic City, New Jersey, U.S.	
Win	10-4	(United States) Ken Heflin	KO	2	15/02/1981	(United States) Knoxville Civic Coliseum, Knoxville, Tennessee, U.S.	
Win	12-8-1	(United States) Mauricio Aldana	KO	7	26/12/1980	(United States) Caesars Palace, Paradise, Nevada, U.S.	
Win	17-5-1	(United States) Ray Hammond	UD	10	01/08/1980	(United States) Caesars Palace, Paradise, Nevada, U.S.	
Win	23-15-1	(United States) Zip Castillo	KO	3	09/05/1980	(United States) Tennessee State Fairgrounds arena, Nashville, Tennessee, U.S.	
Win	78-19-1	(United States) Jimmy Heair	KO	9	31/03/1980	(United States) Stokley Athletics Center, Knoxville, Tennessee, U.S.	
Win	0-8-1	(United States) James Knox	KO	1	08/03/1980	(United States) Nashville, Tennessee, U.S.	
Win	7-6-1	(United States) Larry Rayford	KO	7	30/11/1979	(United States) Louisiana Superdome, New Orleans, Louisiana, U.S.	
Win	2-0	(United States) Larry Martin	KO	2	30/10/1979	(United States) Memphis, Tennessee, U.S.	
Win	2-1	(United States) Jimmy Wallace	KO	2	28/08/1979	(United States) Memphis, Tennessee, U.S.	
Win	1-0	(United States) Rafael Corona	PTS	4	03/08/1979	(United States) Santa Monica Civic Auditorium, Santa Monica, California, U.S.	
