= Leane Suniar =

Indonesian archer (1948–2021)

Personal information
- Nationality: Indonesian
- Born: 4 February 1948 Jakarta, Dutch East Indies (now Indonesia)
- Died: 21 November 2021 (aged 73) Jakarta, Indonesia
- Height: 163 cm (5 ft 4 in)
- Weight: 63 kg (139 lb)

Sport
- Country: Indonesia
- Sport: Archery

Leane Suniar Manurung (4 February 1948 – 21 November 2021) was an Indonesian Olympic archer.

She represented her country in the women's individual competition at the 1976 Summer Olympics. She came in 9th place after both rounds, finishing with 2352 points.

Suniar died from colon cancer on 21 November 2021, at the age of 73.
