= Robert Dauer =

Australian boxer

Personal information
- Nationality: Australian
- Born: 2 February 1953
- Died: 24 August 2021 (aged 68)

Sport
- Sport: Boxing

Robert Dauer (2 February 1953 – 24 August 2021) was an Australian boxer. He competed in the men's welterweight event at the 1976 Summer Olympics.
