= Zbigniew Kicka =

Polish boxer (1950–2022)

Personal information
- Born: 9 April 1950; Polanica-Zdrój, Poland
- Died: 4 May 2022 (aged 72); Wodzisław Śląski, Poland

Sport
- Sport: Boxing

Zbigniew Kicka (9 April 1950 – 4 May 2022) was a Polish boxer. He competed in the men's welterweight event at the 1976 Summer Olympics.
