= Luigi Minchillo =

Italian boxer (1955–2023)

Personal information
- Nationality: Italian
- Born: 17 March 1955 San Paolo di Civitate, Italy
- Died: 25 September 2023 (aged 68) Pesaro, Italy

Sport
- Sport: Boxing
Medal record
Men's boxing
Representing Italy
Mediterranean Games
Gold medal – first place	1975 Algiers	Welterweight

Luigi Minchillo (17 March 1955 – 25 September 2023) was an Italian professional boxer who competed from 1977 to 1988. He twice challenged for a light middleweight world title in 1984, losing to Thomas Hearns by 12-rounds unanimous decision for Hearns' WBC's version of the title, and to Mike McCallum by a thirteenth-round knockout later in the year, for McCallum's WBA's version of it.. As an amateur, he competed in the men's welterweight event at the 1976 Summer Olympics. Minchillo died from a heart attack on 25 September 2023, at the age of 68.
