= Mark Medal =

Puerto Rican-American boxer

Personal information
- Born: June 10, 1957 (age 69) Manhattan, New York, U.S.
- Height: 5 ft 11 1/2 in (182 cm)
- Weight: Light middleweight

Boxing career
- Reach: 79 in (201 cm)
- Stance: Orthodox

Boxing record
- Total fights: 28
- Wins: 24
- Win by KO: 20
- Losses: 3
- Draws: 1

Mark Medal (born June 10, 1957 in Manhattan, NY), is a former professional boxer in the Light Middleweight (154lb) division. A hard-hitting boxer, he was the International Boxing Federation's inaugural world junior-middleweight champion and won 20 of his 28 contests by knockout.

== Professional career ==
Medal, a Puerto Rican-American, turned pro in 1979 and won the vacant IBF Light Middleweight Title with a fifth round TKO win over the also hard-hitting (23-0, with all 23 wins by knockout) Earl Hargrove in 1984, becoming the inaugural champion. He lost the belt in his first defense to Carlos Santos. In 1986 he took on WBC Light Middleweight title holder Thomas Hearns, but lost via TKO.

== Professional boxing record ==
28 fights	24 wins	3 losses
By knockout	20	2
By decision	4	1
Draws	1	

No.	Result	Record	Opponent	Type	Round, time	Date	Location	Notes
28	Draw	24–3–1	Donald Johnson	SD	10 (10)	1987-11-27	Meadowlands Sheraton, East Rutherford, New Jersey, U.S.	
27	Loss	24–3	Thomas Hearns	TKO	8 (12)	1986-06-23	Caesars Palace, Paradise, Nevada, U.S.	For WBC light middleweight title
26	Win	24–2	Dexter Smith	UD	10 (10)	1985-07-25	Felt Forum, New York City, New York, U.S.	
25	Loss	23–2	Carlos Santos	UD	15 (15)	1984-11-02	Felt Forum, New York City, New York, U.S.	Lost IBF light middleweight title
24	Win	23–1	Earl Hargrove	TKO	5 (15)	1984-03-11	Sands Casino Hotel, Atlantic City, New Jersey, U.S.	Won inaugural IBF light middleweight title
23	Win	22–1	Bruce Johnson	TKO	9 (10)	1984-01-20	Felt Forum, New York City, New York, U.S.	
22	Win	21–1	Kevin Howard	UD	10 (10)	1983-11-10	Madison Square Garden, New York City, New York, U.S.	
21	Win	20–1	Freddie Boynton	TKO	8 (10)	1983-09-09	Madison Square Garden, New York City, New York, U.S.	
20	Win	19–1	Steve Delgado	KO	2 (10)	1983-08-19	Felt Forum, New York City, New York, U.S.	
19	Win	18–1	Reggie Ford	KO	5 (10)	1983-04-29	Felt Forum, New York City, New York, U.S.	
18	Win	17–1	Freddie Creech	TKO	4 (10)	1983-02-05	Sands Casino Hotel, Atlantic City, New Jersey, U.S.	
17	Win	16–1	Chris Linson	TKO	6 (10)	1983-01-14	Felt Forum, New York City, New York, U.S.	
16	Win	15–1	Gerald Banks	TKO	2 (8)	1982-12-09	Felt Forum, New York City, New York, U.S.	
15	Win	14–1	Steve Michalerya	TKO	8 (10)	1982-11-05	Felt Forum, New York City, New York, U.S.	
14	Win	13–1	Darryl Penn	UD	10 (10)	1982-09-24	Felt Forum, New York City, New York, U.S.	
13	Win	12–1	Benji Goldstone	KO	1 (10)	1982-04-16	Felt Forum, New York City, New York, U.S.	
12	Win	11–1	Michael Richardson	TKO	8 (8)	1982-03-05	Tropicana Hotel & Casino, Atlantic City, New Jersey, U.S.	
11	Win	10–1	Frank Minnigan	TKO	3 (8)	1981-12-11	Felt Forum, New York City, New York, U.S.	
10	Win	9–1	Henry Lee Saxby	KO	3 (8)	1981-11-05	Felt Forum, New York City, New York, U.S.	
9	Win	8–1	Danny Harold	KO	6 (8)	1981-05-22	Felt Forum, New York City, New York, U.S.	
8	Win	7–1	Fernando Collazo	TKO	1 (6)	1981-04-16	Ice World, Totowa, New Jersey, U.S.	
7	Win	6–1	Ali Perez	TKO	3 (6)	1981-01-07	Felt Forum, New York City, New York, U.S.	
6	Win	5–1	Ricky Johnson	KO	2 (6)	1980-11-12	Felt Forum, New York City, New York, U.S.	
5	Win	4–1	Herbie Wilens	RTD	4 (6)	1980-09-24	Dunn Sports Center, Elizabeth, New Jersey, U.S.	
4	Loss	3–1	Kevin Perry	TKO	1 (6)	1980-03-04	Armory, Elizabeth, New Jersey, U.S.	
3	Win	3–0	Johnny Davis	TKO	2 (4)	1980-01-25	Felt Forum, New York City, New York, U.S.	
2	Win	2–0	Pat Esposito	KO	1 (4)	1979-11-23	Felt Forum, New York City, New York, U.S.	
1	Win	1–0	Hugo Fuat	PTS	4 (4)	1979-10-04	Felt Forum, New York City, New York, U.S.	

== Post-retirement ==
After his retirement from boxing at the age of 30 he became a member of the Jersey City Police Department. In 2009 Medal was indicted and charged with conspiracy to possess a controlled dangerous substance, which resulted in him losing his position as a police officer.

== See also ==
- Afro–Puerto Ricans
- Boxing in Puerto Rico
- List of Puerto Rican boxing world champions
- List of world light-middleweight boxing champions

Sporting positions
World boxing titles
Inaugural champion	IBF Light Middleweight champion March 11, 1984 – November 2, 1984	Succeeded by Carlos Santos
