= Amon Kotey =

Ghanaian boxer

Amon Kotey was a boxer from Ghana. At the 1974 World Amateur Boxing Championships he won the bronze medal in Light Welterweight.

Kotey beat Patricio Diaz (Argentina) and Obisia Nwakpa (Nigeria), before losing to Vladimir Kolev (Bulgaria) in the semi-final.
