= Athanasios Iliadis =

Greek boxer (1952–2026)

Personal information
- Nationality: Greek
- Born: 23 August 1952 Thessaloniki, Greece
- Died: September 2026 (aged 74)

Sport
- Sport: Boxing

Athanasios Iliadis (Greek: Αθανάσιος Ηλιάδης; 23 August 1952 – September 2026) was a Greek boxer. He competed in the men's welterweight event at the 1976 Summer Olympics.

Iliadis died in September 2026, at the age of 74.
