= Carlos Santos (boxer) =

Puerto Rican boxer (b. 1955)

Personal information
- Born: October 1, 1955 (age 71) Ceiba, Puerto Rico
- Height: 5 ft 9 1/2 in (177 cm)
- Weight: Light middleweight

Boxing career
- Reach: 73 1/2 in (187 cm)
- Stance: Southpaw

Boxing record
- Total fights: 43
- Wins: 40
- Win by KO: 27
- Losses: 3

Carlos Santos (born October 1, 1955 in Ceiba, Puerto Rico) is a former boxer from Puerto Rico, who represented his native country as an amateur at the 1976 Summer Olympics in Montreal, Quebec, Canada. There he was eliminated in the quarterfinals. Santos was involved both in the first and the fourth world title bouts involving two Puerto Rican boxers in history. It has been suggested that Santos was not born in Ceiba but in the San Juan area named "Santurce", but it is widely believed that Santos is a Ceiba native.

== Boxing career ==
Carlos Santos debuted as a professional boxer on November 11, 1976, outpointing José Collantes over four rounds in San Juan. He obtained his first knockout victory in his third fight, when he beat Juan Polanco in the third round on May 21, 1977.

Santos' first fight abroad came on November 4 of that year, when he beat Mario Valoy by a third-round knockout in Panama City, Panama. On April 8, 1978, he knocked Collantes out in the fifth round of their rematch.

After three more wins in Puerto Rico, Santos had a fight in the Dominican Republic, where he beat Mario Ramos by a knockout in the eighth round, on April 2, 1979. On his very next fight, Santos outpointed Felix Pagan Pintor, future trainer of Wilfredo Gómez, over ten rounds.

After beating Kid Flash by a third-round knockout on December 1 of that year in St. Thomas, United States Virgin Islands, Santos moved temporarily to Italy, seeking for attention from boxing executives as well as more celebrity than he had in Puerto Rico. On April 4, 1980, Santos made his European debut by knocking out Charles Petersen in the second round at Milan. Santos won seven fights in Italy, all of them by knockout. One curious fight happened on December 20 of 1980 in Turin: Santos was credited with beating Alfonso Hayman, a fringe contender of the era, in the first round. Hayman was under a medical suspension in Italy at the time, however, having been knocked out only eight days before Santos' fight, so his opponent that night is listed on his record as an "unknown opponent".

Carlos Santos made his United States debut on May 23, 1981, day in which Wilfred Benítez became the first Hispanic to be a three division world champion in history, when he knocked Raul Aguirre out in the fifth round as part of the Benitez-Hope fight's undercard.

Santos was 22-0 with 16 knockouts when he received his first world title shot. On November 14 of '81, he and Benitez made history by staging the first world championship bout between two Puerto Ricans, when they boxed in Las Vegas, Nevada. Benitez defeated Santos by a fifteen-round unanimous decision, retaining the WBC world Jr. Middleweight title in an HBO Boxing-televised bout.

Having lost his condition as an undefeated boxer, Santos returned to Italy, where he won four more bouts, three of them by knockout. After winning four additional fights, Santos had a second chance at becoming world champion. When he faced Mark Medal, a New York native who is also Puerto Rican, Santos became the first Puerto Rican boxer to face two Puerto Ricans in world championship fights. On November 2, 1984, at New York's Madison Square Garden and with Gómez among his fans, Santos dropped Medal in the first round, recuperated himself from a fourteenth round knockdown and became the IBF world Jr. Middleweight champion by beating Medal with a fifteen-round unanimous decision.

Santos retained the title on his first defense, outpointing Louis Acaries over 15 rounds on June 1, 1985 in Paris, France. A proposed second defense against Davey Moore was within days of taking place; Moore got injured and the fight never took place. Santos had to await little more than one year for his next fight.

On June 4, 1986, Santos defended his title for the second time, against Buster Drayton in East Rutherford, New Jersey. Santos lost the title by a fifteen-round majority decision.

On September 6, Santos was scheduled to meet another Jr. Middleweight. For an unknown reason, his rival did not show up,. The boxing undercard was being televised live across Puerto Rico, and a Heavyweight boxer, Melvin Epps, was brought in as a substitute. Santos, giving Epps more than 40 pounds and a considerable difference in height advantage, won the fight by a first-round knockout. On his next fight, Santos faced former world Welterweight champion Donald Curry for the USBA's regional Jr. Middleweight title at the Caesars Palace on the Las Vegas Strip. Santos was disqualified in the fifth round of his last major fight.

Santos won his last six fights, one of them in Casablanca, Morocco. On October 30, 1991, he beat Brinatty Maquilon by a ten-round decision in San Juan, announcing his retirement after that bout.

== Professional boxing record ==
43 fights	40 wins	3 losses
By knockout	27	0
By decision	13	2
By disqualification	0	1

No.	Result	Record	Opponent	Type	Round, time	Date	Location	Notes
43	Win	40–3	Brinatty Maquilon	PTS	10 (10)	1991-10-30	San Juan, Puerto Rico	
42	Win	39–3	Clinton Mack	KO	4 (10)	1990-12-15	Emilio E. Huyke Coliseum, Humacao, Puerto Rico	
41	Win	38–3	Tony Burke	PTS	8 (8)	1989-06-08	Ostia, Italy	
40	Win	37–3	Hugo Raul Marinangeli	PTS	10 (10)	1988-03-03	Casablanca, Morocco	
39	Win	36–3	William Clayton	KO	1 (10)	1987-07-14	Caribe Hilton Hotel, San Juan, Puerto Rico	
38	Win	35–3	Charlie Allen	KO	4 (?)	1987-05-28	San Juan, Puerto Rico	
37	Loss	34–3	Donald Curry	DQ	5 (12)	1987-04-04	Caesars Palace, Paradise, Nevada, U.S.	For USBA light-middleweight title
36	Win	34–2	Melvin Epps	KO	2 (?)	1986-09-06	San Juan, Puerto Rico	
35	Loss	33–2	Buster Drayton	MD	15 (15)	1986-06-04	Meadowlands Arena, East Rutherford, New Jersey, U.S.	Lost IBF light-middleweight title
34	Win	33–1	Arthur Wright	KO	2 (?)	1986-05-03	Guaynabo, Puerto Rico	
33	Win	32–1	Louis Acaries	UD	15 (15)	1985-06-01	Parc des Princes, Paris, France	Retained IBF light-middleweight title
32	Win	31–1	Dwight Walker	MD	10 (10)	1985-03-27	Resorts Casino Hotel, Atlantic City, New Jersey, U.S.	
31	Win	30–1	Mark Medal	UD	15 (15)	1984-11-02	Felt Forum, New York City, New York, U.S.	Won IBF light-middleweight title
30	Win	29–1	Ray Izaquirre	KO	1 (?)	1984-07-21	Coliseo Salvador Dijols, Ponce, Puerto Rico	
29	Win	28–1	Reyes Escalera	TKO	1 (?)	1984-03-31	Roberto Clemente Coliseum, San Juan, Puerto Rico	
28	Win	27–1	Inocencio De la Rosa	KO	5 (?)	1983-12-14	Roberto Clemente Coliseum, San Juan, Puerto Rico	
27	Win	26–1	Mosimo Maeleke	TKO	6 (?)	1983-05-20	Cagliari, Italy	
26	Win	25–1	Lomami Wa Lomami	RTD	5 (?)	1983-04-07	Sassari, Italy	
25	Win	24–1	Mbayo Wa Mbayo	PTS	8 (8)	1982-11-26	Trezzano sul Naviglio, Italy	
24	Win	23–1	Horace McKenzie	TKO	6 (10)	1982-05-07	Bologna, Italy	
23	Loss	22–1	Wilfred Benítez	UD	15 (15)	1981-11-14	Showboat Hotel and Casino, Las Vegas, Nevada, U.S.	For WBC light-middleweight title
22	Win	22–0	Raul Aguirre	TKO	5 (10)	1981-05-23	Caesars Palace, Paradise, Nevada, U.S.	
21	Win	21–0	Peter Neal	PTS	8 (8)	1981-04-06	Rome, Italy	
20	Win	20–0	Alfonso Hayman	KO	1 (?)	1980-12-20	Turin, Italy	
19	Win	19–0	Steve Michalerya	TKO	8 (?)	1980-09-10	Teatro Ariston, Sanremo, Italy	
18	Win	18–0	Robert Taylor	TKO	2 (?)	1980-08-10	Siderno, Italy	
17	Win	17–0	Esperno Postl	TKO	4 (8)	1980-07-05	Ostia, Italy	
16	Win	16–0	Celestine Kanynda	KO	3 (8)	1980-05-30	Rome, Italy	
15	Win	15–0	Charlie Peterson	KO	2 (?)	1980-04-04	Milan, Italy	
14	Win	14–0	Kid Flash	KO	3 (?)	1979-12-01	Saint Thomas, U.S. Virgin Islands	
13	Win	13–0	Gilberto Almonte	KO	3 (?)	1979-08-11	Cayey, Puerto Rico	
12	Win	12–0	Felix Pintor	PTS	10 (10)	1979-06-16	Roberto Clemente Coliseum, San Juan, Puerto Rico	
11	Win	11–0	Mario Ramos	KO	8 (?)	1979-04-02	Santo Domingo, Dominican Republic	
10	Win	10–0	Mustapha Ali	KO	8 (8)	1979-01-27	Roberto Clemente Coliseum, San Juan, Puerto Rico	
9	Win	9–0	Tyrone Phelps	KO	4 (?)	1978-10-28	Roberto Clemente Coliseum, San Juan, Puerto Rico	
8	Win	8–0	Ricky Weigel	PTS	8 (8)	1978-09-09	Hiram Bithorn Stadium, San Juan, Puerto Rico	
7	Win	7–0	Feliciano Cintron	KO	3 (?)	1978-06-03	Roberto Clemente Coliseum, San Juan, Puerto Rico	
6	Win	6–0	Jose Collante	KO	5 (?)	1978-04-08	Juan Ramón Loubriel Stadium, Bayamón, Puerto Rico	
5	Win	5–0	Mario Valoyes	KO	4 (10)	1977-09-03	Arena de Colon, Colón, Panama	
4	Win	4–0	Alex Poratta	PTS	6 (6)	1977-07-11	Roberto Clemente Coliseum, San Juan, Puerto Rico	
3	Win	3–0	Juan Polanco	KO	3 (?)	1977-05-21	Roberto Clemente Coliseum, San Juan, Puerto Rico	
2	Win	2–0	Alex Poratta	PTS	4 (4)	1977-02-12	Juan Ramón Loubriel Stadium, Bayamón, Puerto Rico	
1	Win	1–0	Jose Collante	PTS	4 (4)	1976-10-11	Roberto Clemente Coliseum, San Juan, Puerto Rico	

== Personal life ==
During the 1980s, Santos moved to Italy for some time at the behest of manager Yamil Chade. During a ten-year stay, he also had a parallel career in modeling. Upon his return to Puerto Rico, Santos began working for Pan American Grain. He retired after 25 years in the company, to receive treatment for prostate cancer. Santos was cleared of the condition in August 2019.

== See also ==
- List of southpaw stance boxers
- Afro–Puerto Ricans
- Boxing in Puerto Rico
- List of Puerto Rican boxing world champions
- List of world light-middleweight boxing champions

Sporting positions
World boxing titles
Preceded by Mark Medal	IBF light-middleweight champion November 2, 1984 – 1986; Stripped	Vacant Title next held by Buster Drayton
