= Valery Rachkov =

Kazakhstani boxer (born 1956)

Personal information
- Nationality: Kazakhstani
- Born: 24 April 1956 (age 70) Almaty, Kazakhstan

Sport
- Sport: Boxing
Medal record
Representing the Soviet Union
World Championships
Gold medal – first place	1978 Belgrade	Welterweight

Valery Rachkov (born 24 April 1956) is a Kazakhstani boxer. He competed in the men's welterweight event at the 1976 Summer Olympics as a member of the Soviet Union. At the 1976 Summer Olympics, he defeated Martti Marjamaa and David Jackson, before losing to Jochen Bachfield.
