= Tony Perez (referee) =

American boxing referee (1931–2021)

Anthony Perez (1931 – December 14, 2021) was a Puerto Rican boxing referee and judge. During his career, he refereed many major boxing fights and participated in a number of boxing related documentaries.

Perez was active as a boxing referee during five decades; he oversaw fights between 1968 and 2005 and was both acclaimed and criticized among boxing's connoisseurs; he refereed 431 professional boxing fights, including many world title ones. Several of the matches he refereed involved world boxing champions and Hall of Fame members.

== Early life and career ==
Perez was born in Brooklyn, New York, but lived in Puerto Rico as a youth before returning to New York. He lived in Barnegat Township, New Jersey. He was licensed to referee fights both in New York and in New Jersey, but he refereed fights around the world.

Perez started boxing as an amateur while in the United States Army, according to People Magazine. He was the Army's Caribbean area's Welterweight champion and then went to serve in Germany, where he obtained the Army's European command championship as well.

One night at a fight his mother attended, he got a cut on one of his eyes, leading her to ask him to give up boxing. Perez got married and had a son, he then worked odd jobs until finding work at a Seagram's distillery as a salesman. It was then that he decided to return to boxing in the refereeing and judging capacities, but it took him several years to be assigned his first fight.

== Major fights refereed ==
The first bout that Perez was assigned was the one between Buster Mathis and James J. Woody, which Mathis won by sixth-round technical knockout September 26, 1968, at the Madison Square Garden in New York. On May 26, 1969, Perez was the referee for the Dick Tiger versus Nino Benvenuti ten round non-title affair at the Madison Square Garden. Tiger won the fight by ten round unanimous decision; Perez was both the referee and one of the three judges for this fight and he scored it for Tiger 7–2–1; both Tiger and Benvenuti are now members of the International Boxing Hall of Fame.

=== First world title bout ===
The first world championship bout refereed by Perez was the Joe Frazier versus Jimmy Ellis main attraction on Monday, February 16, 1970. Ellis was the defending World Boxing Association's world heavyweight champion with a record of 27 wins and 5 losses, 12 wins by knockout against Frazier, who was undefeated and untied in 24 bouts, with 20 knockout wins, and recognized (Frazier) as the world heavyweight champion in the American states of Illinois, New York, Pennsylvania, Massachusetts and Maine. This bout also took place at the Madison Square Garden. Frazier won the bout by fifth-round technical knockout after Ellis could not come out of his corner after the fourth round. Two weeks later, Perez was back in the ring to referee the bout between future world middleweight champion Rodrigo Valdez of Colombia and ranked Puerto Rican Pete Toro, which Valdez lost by ten-round decision.

On October 26, 1970, Perez was the referee in the bout between the comebacking Muhammad Ali, who was making his first fight after a three-year exile forced by boxing authorities over his refusal to join the United States Army in 1967, and California's Jerry Quarry, the first of two fights between those two boxers. The bout was held at the City Auditorium in Atlanta, Georgia, and Ali won by third-round technical knockout.

Over the next three years, Perez oversaw 18 more fights, all in New York and most at the Madison Square Garden or the theater on the Garden's property, the Madison Square Garden's Felt Forum. Many of these bouts included world champions and top rated boxers such as Angel Espada, Harold Weston, Enrique Pinder, Davey Vasquez, the Bobby Cassidy-Tom Bethea match, the Jerry Quarry versus Randy Neumann fight, Jorge Ahumada against Ray Anderson and Vito Antuofermo facing Danny McAloon. None of these were generally considered to be very important fights, however.

=== Ali-Frazier II ===
Then, on January 28, 1974, Perez came to the international spotlight when he was chosen to referee the Muhammad Ali-Joe Frazier rematch, pitting the two former world Heavyweight champions as they tried to return to the world title, in a match contested for the North American Boxing Federation's Heavyweight title. Frazier had 30 wins and one second-round knockout loss to George Foreman (when he lost the world Heavyweight title) while Ali was 43–2, with 31 knockout wins, having lost to Frazier in their first bout on March 8, 1971, and to Ken Norton; he had avenged the loss to Norton and was now trying to avenge his loss to Frazier; at stake was a fight against Foreman for the world title. His handling of the bout was marred by an incident in the second round where Ali had hurt Frazier with 20 seconds to go in the second round and Perez stepped between them as he thought he had heard the bell sound. Ali went on to win by twelve round unanimous decision, but Frazier and his trainer Eddie Futch were critical of Perez's unwillingness to penalize Ali for repeatedly holding Frazier during the encounter.

=== Shavers-Stallings ===
On November 4, 1974, Perez was the referee for a bout that is widely considered by fans and experts as one of the biggest upsets of boxing of that era as Bob Stallings, a 21 win, 24 loss, with only 4 knockout wins, trialhorse, beat 46 win, 3 loss, and 45 knockouts Earnie Shavers, by a ten rounds decision, dropping top contender Shavers, renowned as one of the hardest punching boxers in the sport's history, in round nine. Perez, who was also one of the three official judges for the bout, scored it 6–4 in rounds for Stallings. This bout was held at the Felt Forum. Eighteen days later, Perez was back as both referee and judge for the main event between Hall of Fame member Emile Griffith and Vito Antuofermo at the Madison Square Garden, which Antuofermo won by ten rounds unanimous decision. Perez voted 6-3-1 for the winner.

=== Ali-Wepner ===
Perez's next assignment also became a very prominent fight in boxing history when, on March 24, 1975, Ali defended the world Heavyweight title versus Chuck Wepner. Perez was called in to referee this bout; his second fight refereed outside New York (the first had been Ali-Quarry I). Underdog Wepner became an instant celebrity when, in round nine, he scored a knockdown of Ali. This also became a controversial matter-many have felt that Wepner only dropped Ali because Wepner stepped on Ali's foot as he landed a punch to Ali's heart. Wepner disputes this. Nevertheless, the knockdown and fight allegedly inspired Sylvester Stallone to write and film the first Rocky film. Perez's refereeing that night was, ironically, unsatisfying to the winner Ali, who, according to Perez, complained that Perez let Wepner hit Ali with low blows and called him a "dirty dog". Ali commented that Perez was "not Black and (he's) not White-(he's) Puerto Rican but (he's) trying to be White", "He is more Black than White, but he's trying to be White".

Perez hit Ali and ABC Wide World of Sports (which televised the bout in the United States) with a suit asking for 20 million dollars, a federal court resolved the suit in favor of Ali.

Perez was the referee for Carlos Monzon's only fight as a professional in the United States, when he stopped Tony Licata in ten rounds to retain the world Middleweight title at the Madison Square Garden, on June 30, 1975. He next took his first trip abroad as a referee, going to Oslo, Norway to officiate the match between Monzon's personal friend, Argentina's Victor Galindez and Norway's Harald Skog for the former's WBA world Light-Heavyweight crown, a bout won by the Argentine by a third-round knockout on March 28, 1976.

After referring several other major fights, including one of Yoko Gushiken in Japan and bouts including Alexis Arguello, Wilfred Benítez (versus Bruce Curry), Alfonso Zamora, Wilfredo Gómez and George Foreman, Perez was assigned the World Boxing Council's world Junior Lightweight championship fight between 3 division world champion Arguello (defending his second divisional world title) and future two time world Junior Lightweight champion Rafael Limon of Mexico. Arguello and Limon fought on Sunday, July 8, 1979, at the Felt Forum, Arguello retaining the title by stopping Limon (who contested the stoppage bitterly) in round eleven.

== Fight at Rahway ==
Perez visited Rahway State Prison in Woodbridge Township, New Jersey, at a time when professional boxing fights were allowed in American prison systems, to oversee the ten round bout between James Scott and Alvaro Lopez, Saturday, December 1 of 1979, a match in which Perez also served as a voting judge. Scott, who was an inmate at the same jail at that time, won a ten-round unanimous decision, Perez scoring the fight 8 rounds to 2.

=== Cooney versus Norton ===
On May 11, 1981, Perez was given referee duties for the HBO Boxing televised event between Heavyweights Gerry Cooney and the former WBC world champion, Hall of Fame member Ken Norton. Cooney won the fight by technical knockout 54 seconds into the first round. The fight catapulted Cooney into his showdown with Larry Holmes for the WBC world title and culminated Norton's career. Perez was criticized for not stopping the match earlier, as Norton was motionless in a corner seconds before Perez intervened.

Next came the WBA world bantamweight title match between champion Jeff Chandler and fellow Puerto Rican, former world champion Julian Solís of Puerto Rico. This was a rematch and Perez refereed it; on Saturday, July 25, 1981, at the Resorts International in Atlantic City, New Jersey Chandler retained the title stopping Solis in seven rounds. Three weeks later, Perez was in Panama refereeing the WBC world Junior Flyweight title match between world champion Hilario Zapata, a future Hall of Famer also, and future world champion German Torres of Mexico. On August 15, 1981, Zapata outpointed Torres over fifteen rounds.

The next major match refereed by Perez pitted an already legendary boxer and (later) Hall of Famer (Arguello) defending his third divisional world title, the WBC Lightweight one, against a future legend, world champion and Hall of Famer himself, Ray Mancini, at Bally's Park Place Hotel and Casino in Atlantic City, October 3, 1981. Arguello retained the title with a fourteenth-round knockout in a fight ended by a highlight reel knockout.

=== Disqualification of Elisha Obed ===
On November 12, 1981, Perez was involved in two rather large fights, Rocky Lockridge versus Refugio Rojas (won by future world champion Lockridge by ten round majority decision; Perez, also a judge in this fight, scored it for Lockridge 7–2–1) and future world Light Heavyweight champion Bobby Czyz versus former Junior Middleweight world champion Elisha Obed of The Bahamas. The Czyz-Obed bout, a Middleweight contest scheduled for ten rounds, was notable because Perez disqualified Obed in round six for what Perez considered to be excessive holding on the Bahamian's part. Obed tried to attack Perez after the match's end, Perez warning him to stay away from Perez.

=== Refereeing Salvador Sanchez's last bout ===
Perez was the referee, on July 21, 1982, of the last bout fought by legendary Mexican boxer Salvador Sanchez when he defended, successfully, his WBC world Featherweight title against a then almost unknown, but now also legendary, challenger Azumah Nelson from Ghana. Sanchez retained the crown by a fifteenth-round technical knockout, then died tragically 21 days later, killed in a car crash near Mexico City. Both Sanchez and Nelson later became members of the International Boxing Hall of Fame as well.

=== Luis Resto versus Billy Collins, Jr. ===
Almost a year after Sanchez-Nelson, Perez was involved in another very controversial fight, although this time no one could blame him for the controversy that arose after the match; On June 16, 1983, in the program headlined by the Davey Moore versus Roberto Durán WBA world Junior Middleweight championship bout, Perez got to referee and judge a Junior Middleweight encounter between 14 wins, no losses or draws Billy Collins, Jr. and 20 wins, 8 losses and 2 draws Luis Resto. Resto pounded Collins for ten rounds and was initially given a ten rounds unanimous decision win, but Billy Collins, Sr. noticed that padding had been removed from Resto's gloves when Collins, Sr. touched one of them right after the bout. Upon finding evidence of this by the New York State Athletic Commission, the fight's result was overturned and changed to a "no-contest" instead. Collins, Jr. sustained career ending injuries to his eyes and died on March 6, 1984, when he crashed his car in Antioch, Tennessee, while Resto and Resto's trainer Panama Lewis were tried in court during 1986 and sentenced to three and six years in jail, respectively, Resto being released in 1989 and Lewis in 1990.

Then, on September 10, 1983, Perez was the referee for the Larry Holmes versus Scott Frank WBC world Heavyweight title bout held at the Harrah's Marina Hotel and Casino in Atlantic City. Holmes beat Frank by fifth-round technical knockout. Five days later, Perez was back at the Madison Square Garden as referee of the Ray Mancini-Orlando Romero WBA world Lightweight championship match, which Mancini won by ninth-round knockout when Perez counted the Peruvian Romero out as Romero sat on the canvas after a punch.

=== Coetzee vs. Dokes ===
On September 23, 1983, Perez participated in another historic fight, when Michael Dokes defended his WBA world Heavyweight title against Gerrie Coetzee. South African Coetzee beat Dokes by tenth-round knockout at the Richfield Coliseum in Richfield, Ohio, becoming not only the first White world Heavyweight champion since Ingemar Johansson 23 years before, but also the first world Heavyweight champion from Africa in boxing history.

=== Hagler's knockdown ===
Perez refereed the March 30, 1984, world Middleweight title fight between champion Marvelous Marvin Hagler and his Argentine challenger, Juan "The Hammer" Roldan at the Riviera Hotel in Las Vegas, Nevada. In a situation somewhat similar to the Ali-Wepner fight he'd refereed years before, Hagler went down seconds after the first round had begun as he slipped followed by a right hand from Roldan that grazed the champion's head. Perez called it a knockdown, the only official knockdown suffered by Hagler in his professional boxing career. In round three, Roldan became entangled against the ropes after a Hagler combination and fell; Perez also ruled that a knockdown. Hagler eventually retained the title by a tenth-round technical knockout.

== Jamaica's first world championship ==
Perez was the referee on October 19, 1984, for the match fought for the vacant WBA's world Junior Middleweight title which had been vacated by Durán, between Ireland's Sean Mannion and Jamaica's Mike McCallum. This bout marked the first time that two women (Carol Castellano and Carol Polis) acted as judges in a professional boxing match and, after McCallum's 15 round unanimous decision victory, the first time a Jamaican boxer won a professional boxing world's championship.

=== Julio Cesar Chavez ===
Tony Perez was given the responsibility of officiating the WBC world Junior Lightweight title bout between champion Julio César Chávez of Mexico and challenger Refugio Rojas as part of the Héctor Camacho vs. Edwin Rosario fight's undercard, June 13, 1986, at the Madison Square Garden. Chavez, Sr. dropped Rojas to the floor several times before winning by seventh-round technical knockout.

Only six weeks later, Perez again shared a ring with the Mexican legend when Chavez defended his world title against former and future world champion Rocky Lockridge, whom the future Hall of Famer from Mexico beat by a somewhat controversial, twelve round majority decision with Perez as referee on Sunday, August 3, 1986, at the Stade Louis II in Fontvieille, Monaco.

=== Bassa-McAuley ===
On Saturday, March 26, 1988, Perez refereed the Fidel Bassa-Dave McAuley rematch for Colombian Bassa's WBA world Flyweight championship in a battle that had generated much interest both in Ireland and internationally. Bassa retained the title by a twelve-round unanimous decision at the Kings Hall in Belfast, Northern Ireland.

=== Evander Holyfield ===
Perez refereed Evander Holyfield's second bout in the Heavyweight division. Holyfield, already a world champion in the Cruiserweight division, battled former WBC world Heavyweight champion Pinklon Thomas on December 9, 1988, at the Convention Hall in Atlantic City, knocking him out in seven rounds. Holyfield would later become world Heavyweight champion multiple times.

=== Damiani-Du Plooy ===
The World Boxing Organization asked Perez to referee their inaugural WBO world heavyweight championship bout on May 6, 1989, at the Stadio Nicola de Simone in Syracuse, Sicily, Italy between South Africa's Johnny du Plooy and Italy's Francesco Damiani. Damiani won the contest by third-round knockout (despite this, most outside the WBO continued recognizing Mike Tyson as "undisputed" champion in the division). Perez was the Italy fight's referee.

=== Camacho-Paz ===
On Saturday, February 3, 1990, Perez refereed the match between WBO world Junior Welterweight champion Hector Camacho Sr. and his challenger, former and future world champion Vinny Paz (then known as Vinny Pazienza) at the Convention Hall in Atlantic City. Camacho Sr. retained the title by twelve rounds unanimous decision.

=== Jung Koo Chang-Muangchai Kittikasem ===
Perez flew to South Korea during 1991 to referee the May 18 bout between WBC World Flyweight champion Muangchai Kittikasem of Thailand, 14 wins and a loss to Michael Carbajal coming in with ten wins by knockout, and the 38 wins, 3 losses, 17 wins by knockout challenger, former WBC world Junior Flyweight champion and future Hall of Famer Jung Koo Chang of South Korea at the Olympic Gymnastic Gymnasium in Seoul. This match is also considered a classic; Kittikasem had been floored three times (twice in round five and once in round eleven) and was on the verge of being defeated by knockout when he connected with a left hook and right hand that sent Chang down with about one minute left for the fight to finish in round 12, badly hurting Chang. The South Korean fighter rose but was downed again immediately afterwards, with Perez halting the fight with 24 seconds to go, giving the defending world champion a come from behind victory. This was Chang's last boxing fight and his only knockout loss as a professional boxer.

=== Mercer KO5 Morrison ===
Perez was the referee of one of the first major boxing pay per view and WBO fights, when then WBO heavyweight world champion Ray Mercer beat Rocky V star and future WBO heavyweight world champion Tommy Morrison, to retain the championship, with a fifth-round technical knockout that is often considered one of the best finishes in boxing history on October 18, 1991, at the Convention Hall in Atlantic City. Perez received harsh criticism from many for his slowness in stopping the fight as Mercer hit Morrison with 18 unanswered punches.

=== McClellan-Bell ===
Perez's first fight in Puerto Rico took place on Friday, August 6, 1993, at the Ruben Rodriguez Coliseum in Bayamon as part of a program headed by a Félix Trinidad fight. In it, WBC world Middleweight champion Gerald McClellan, 28 wins, 2 losses with 26 knockouts, dispatched challenger Jay Bell in only 20 seconds of the first round, scoring the fastest knockout in a Middleweight world championship fight in professional boxing's history. This match was broadcast on Showtime Championship Boxing.

=== Oliver McCall versus Frank Bruno ===
Oliver McCall, WBC world Heavyweight champion with 26 wins and 5 losses, with 18 knockouts, went to London, England, to defend his title versus British Frank Bruno, 39 wins and 4 losses with 38 knockouts, at Wembley Stadium on September 2, 1995, with Perez as referee. Bruno won the title by beating McCall by twelve rounds unanimous decision in what turned out to be the last win of his career.

=== Camacho Sr.-Durán I ===
Tony Perez was then called on to referee the pay per view match between two aging but legendary former world champions, Hector Camacho Sr. and Roberto Durán, which was held on June 22, 1996, at the Mark Etess Arena in Atlantic City. Camacho Sr. won the contest between the two future Hall of Famers by a 12 rounds unanimous decision a victory which Camacho Sr. would repeat several years later in a rematch.

=== Roy Jones Jr. controversy ===
Perez was again involved in a controversial match when Roy Jones Jr., the WBC's world Light Heavyweight champion and, at 34 wins, no defeats or draws, with 29 wins by knockout widely considered either the best or second best fighter in the world at that era, took on challenger Montell Griffin, undefeated and untied in 26 fights with 18 wins by knockout on March 21, 1997, at the Taj Majal Hotel and Casino in Atlantic City. The champion dropped the challenger in round nine but then threw a punch to his head as Griffin sat on one knee. Perez disqualified Jones Jr., giving Griffin the world championship and Jones Jr. his first loss as a professional. Perez explained that he "was counting because if he could have continued, (Perez would have taken) one or two points away from Jones". This fight was also broadcast on television by HBO Boxing.

== Later years as referee ==
Perez continued to referee for seven more years after the Griffin-Jones Jr. I fight, including many world championship fights taking place in the United States, Mexico, Thailand, Germany and other places. The last match he refereed was one between Panamanian Darmell Castillo, a 10 wins, 8 losses and 2 draws with 6 knockout wins boxer versus Bryant Brannon, a 21 wins, 2 losses with 14 knockout wins contender, at the Sovereign Bank Arena in Trenton, New Jersey, on October 21, 2005. Brannon won by six rounds majority decision in what was also Brannon's final fight as a professional boxer.

== Personal life and death ==
Perez appeared in a number of boxing related documentaries, most notably Assault in the Ring about the Collins-Resto bout. During his retirement, he made occasional public appearances at boxing related events.

He met his wife, future boxing judge Barbara Perez, as they were both working at the Seagram's distillery. His wife lost a brother, who was a firefighter, during the September 11 attacks in 2001. She is a member of the New Jersey state's boxing hall of fame.

Perez died on December 14, 2021, at the age of 90.

== See also ==
- List of Puerto Ricans
