= List of boxing films =

This is a list of films about boxing featuring notable sports films where boxing plays a central role in the development of the plot.

== List ==
Title	Year	Genre	Notes	Ref.
Leonard–Cushing Fight	1894	Documentary	Silent film	
Corbett and Courtney Before the Kinetograph	1894	Documentary	Silent film	
Boxing Match; or, Glove Contest	1896	Documentary	Silent film	
The Corbett–Fitzsimmons Fight	1897	Documentary	A full-length version of a 19th-century title bout.	
The Gordon Sisters Boxing	1901	Documentary	Silent film	
The Joe Gans – Battling Nelson Fight	1906	Archival footage	Silent footage of most of the championship bout that lasted an astounding 48 rounds. The film company ran out of money – and film – in the 38th round and had to stop shooting	
The Johnson–Jeffries Fight	1910	Documentary	Footage from a bout between heavyweights Jack Johnson and James J. Jeffries.	
The Knockout	1914	Short subject, comedy	To show his girl how brave he is, Pug (Roscoe Arbuckle) challenges a champion.	
The Third String	1914	Comedy	A man poses as a boxer to impress a barmaid and is forced to fight the champion.	
The Champion	1915	Short, comedy	Charlie Chaplin puts a "good luck" horseshoe into his boxing glove and wins.	
The White Hope	1915	Drama	An Earl's sister returns to a boxer in time to help him win.	
Twenty-One	1918	Comedy	A young man trades places with a lookalike boxer and learns to fight for what he wants.	
Square Joe	1922	Drama	An innocent boxer is convicted of killing a policeman during a raid on a gambling operation. He is sentenced to death and his friends attempt to locate the real murderer.	
The World's Champion	1922	Drama	To impress a British noblewoman, a man goes to America to put up his dukes.	
The Leather Pushers	1922	Serial	After his father goes broke, a young man (Reginald Denny) fights for money.	
The Champeen	1923	Short subject, comedy	Our Gang members promote and fight a boxing match.	
Hogan's Alley	1925	Comedy	A knockout earns Lefty (Monte Blue) the title, but nearly costs him his girl.	
Battling Butler	1926	Comedy	Silent film directed by and starring Buster Keaton.	
One-Punch O'Day	1926	Comedy	A whole town's money is riding on Jimmy O'Day (Billy Sullivan).	
The Shock Punch	1926	Drama	Randall Savage floors a boxing champ, then a construction boss to win a girl.	
The Ring	1927	Drama	Alfred Hitchcock silent film about a pugilist known as "One-Round Jack."	
Knockout Reilly	1927	Drama	Falsely convicted of a crime, Reilly (Richard Dix) fights the guy who framed him.	
Boxing Gloves	1929	Short subject, comedy	An Our Gang remake of The Champeen (1923)	
Night Parade	1929	Drama	A father tries to persuade his middleweight-champ son not to take a dive.	
The Shakedown	1929	Drama	A boxer who makes a living losing fixed matches decides to turn his life around.	
Hold Everything	1930	Comedy	Georges Carpentier's training is disrupted by an amateur called Gink (Joe E. Brown).	
City Lights	1931	Comedy	A tramp (Charlie Chaplin) accumulates money by boxing to help a flower girl.	
The Champ	1931	Drama	Story of a boy's love for a doomed ex-boxer. Academy Award for Wallace Beery.	
Iron Man	1931	Drama	Lightweight contender Kid Mason is betrayed by his scheming wife (Jean Harlow).	
Sidewalks of New York	1931	Comedy	Buster Keaton stars as a gymnasium owner.	
Winner Take All	1932	Drama	Washed-up Jimmy Kane (James Cagney) fights to help a young widow.	
The Big Timer	1932	Comedy	Cooky Bradford ends up fighting for, and falling for, his manager's daughter.	
They Never Come Back	1932	Drama	A boxer framed for a crime fights to pay the debt of the friend who betrayed him.	
The Life of Jimmy Dolan	1932	Drama	Believed to be dead, a boxer (Douglas Fairbanks, Jr.) tries to begin a new life.	
Madison Square Garden	1932	Drama	After a boxer (Jack Oakie) takes a beating, his fellow fighters come to his rescue.	
The Bermondsey Kid	1933	Drama	A British newsboy ends up in a fight contest against a friend.	
The Prizefighter and the Lady	1933	Romantic Comedy	Real-life boxer Max Baer co-stars in a glove story with Myrna Loy.	
Palooka	1934	Comedy	Joe Palooka leaves rural life to follow a trainer (Jimmy Durante) to the big city.	
The Personality Kid	1934	Drama	Ritzy McCarty (Pat O'Brien) wins fixed fights, cheats on wife.	
Excuse My Glove	1936	Comedy	A meek British man accepts a dare to step into a boxing ring at a fair.	
Conflict	1936	Drama	John Wayne as a con man who loses bare-knuckle bouts on purpose.	
The Milky Way	1936	Comedy	A milkman (Harold Lloyd) who can deliver a punch becomes an overnight sensation.	
Prison Shadows	1936	Drama	Out on parole, a boxer called "Killer" ends up with most of his opponents dead.	
Two-Fisted Gentleman	1936	Drama	A fast-rising prizefighter jilts his girlfriend and takes up with a blonde.	
Keep Fit	1937	Comedy	A department store employee (George Formby) takes up boxing.	
Kid Galahad	1937	Crime, drama	Nick Donati (Edward G. Robinson) turns a young bellhop into boxer Kid Galahad.	
The Duke Comes Back	1937	Drama	Duke Foster weds a rich girl, then fights to aid her embezzler father.	
Hollywood Stadium Mystery	1938	Mystery	A crimefighter and writer both try to solve a murder in a boxing ring.	
The Crowd Roars	1938	Drama	Accidentally killing a friend in-ring, "Killer" McCoy must save woman he loves.	
Kid Nightingale	1939	Drama	A singing waiter punches a customer, becomes a prizefighter.	
Golden Boy	1939	Drama	A promising violinist (William Holden) risks his hands by prizefighting.	
Winner Take All	1939	Drama	Rodeo cowpoke turned pugilist fights for a female sportswriter (Gloria Stuart).	
There Ain't No Justice	1939	Drama	An aspiring boxer (Jimmy Hanley) discovers corruption in the sport.	
The Kid from Kokomo	1939	Comedy	A manager (Pat O'Brien) helps a Hoosier palooka find his mother.	
They Made Me a Criminal	1939	Drama	Accused of murder, a boxing champ (John Garfield) becomes a fugitive.	
City for Conquest	1940	Drama	James Cagney as a fighter who is blinded in the ring.	
Golden Gloves	1940	Drama	A sportswriter sets out to clean up amateur boxing.	
Pride of the Bowery	1940	Comedy	The East Side Kids turn to the boxing ring to help a friend.	
Here Comes Mr. Jordan	1941	Comedy	A fighter taken too soon is reincarnated in a new body. Remade in 1978 as Heaven Can Wait, using American football as backdrop instead of boxing.	
Knockout	1941	Drama	Arrogant boxer Johnny Rocket (Arthur Kennedy) has a manipulative manager.	
Bowery Blitzkrieg	1941	Comedy	The East Side Kids end up in Golden Gloves bouts in this Bowery Boys tale.	
Ringside Maisie	1941	Romance	Ann Sothern falls for the manager of a fighter blinded in the ring.	
The Pittsburgh Kid	1941	Drama	Real-life boxer Billy Conn plays a contender falsely accused of a murder.	
Sunday Punch	1942	Rom-Com	A janitor and a medical student become pals, then rival prizefighters.	
Treat 'Em Rough	1942	Comedy	The Panama Kid (Eddie Albert) learns his father's accused of embezzling.	
Gentleman Jim	1942	Biographical	Light-hearted biopic, with Errol Flynn as heavyweight champ James J. Corbett.	
The Great John L.	1945	Biographical	Boston strong boy John L. Sullivan wins the belt, battles the bottle.	
Joe Palooka, Champ	1946	Comedy	First of 11 Monogram films featuring comic-strip character.	
The Kid from Brooklyn	1946	Comedy	Remake of 1936 milkman tale, this time with Danny Kaye.	
The First Glove	1946	Comedy	Soviet sports comedy film directed by Andrey Frolov about young boxer Nikita Krutikov.	
Body and Soul	1947	Film noir	John Garfield is a boxer involved with corrupt promoters. Three Oscar nominations.	
Killer McCoy	1947	Drama	Mickey Rooney fights to pay off his dad's gambling debts.	
Whiplash	1948	Film noir	A painter adopts the ring name "Mike Angelo" when he fights for a sadistic club owner.	
The Big Punch	1948	Drama	Refusing to take a dive, an honest kid (Gordon MacRae) gets framed for a murder.	
The Set-Up	1949	Film noir	A has-been boxer's manager bets on him to lose, with dire consequences if he doesn't.	
Fighting Fools	1949	Comedy	The Bowery Boys work at a boxing arena	
Champion	1949	Film noir	An arrogant fighter (Kirk Douglas) makes it to the top, alienating all who care about him. Six Oscar nominations.	
Duke of Chicago	1949	Comedy	Chicago's retired Jim Brody makes a comeback against champ Killer Bronski.	
Right Cross	1950	Romance	June Allyson takes over dad's fight promotions, handles boxer Ricardo Montalbán.	
The Golden Gloves Story	1950	Drama	An amateur boxer falls in love with a referee's daughter.	
Iron Man	1951	Drama	A coal miner turned prizefighter loses control inside the ring.	
Day of the Fight	1951	Documentary	Stanley Kubrick's first film, a documentary on middleweight Walter Cartier.	
The Quiet Man	1952	Romance	A visiting American ex-boxer (John Wayne) meets an Irish lass (Maureen O'Hara) and literally has to fight for her. Seven Oscar nominations.	
The Fighter	1952	Drama	A story by Jack London about a fighter during the 1910 Mexican rebellion.	
Flesh and Fury	1952	Drama	A deaf boxer (Tony Curtis) wins the title, undergoes an operation so he can hear.	
The Ring	1952	Drama	A young Mexican (Lalo Ríos) seeks respect of Americans and love of a beauty (Rita Moreno).	
Glory Alley	1952	Drama	Socks Barbarossa (Ralph Meeker) bolts from a New Orleans ring one night, without explanation.	
The Joe Louis Story	1953	Biographical	The life and career of the longtime champ, played by Coley Wallace.	
Off Limits	1953	Comedy	A boxer (Mickey Rooney) is drafted into the Army, so his manager (Bob Hope) enlists.	
It's Always Fair Weather	1953	Musical	Fight manager Gene Kelly discovers his contender is about to take a dive.	
The Flanagan Boy	1953	Drama	British film about a rising ring star who falls for a millionaire's wife.	
The Square Ring	1953	Drama	British film about one night's events inside a boxing arena.	
Champ for a Day	1953	Drama	After his manager is murdered, a heavyweight schemes to get even.	
Tennessee Champ	1954	Drama	A devoutly religious boy mistakenly believes he killed a boxer (Charles Bronson).	
The Long Gray Line	1955	Biographical	A look at the 50-year career of Martin Maher who served as boxing instructor at West Point	
The Harder They Fall	1956	Film noir	A former sportswriter (Humphrey Bogart) works for a mobster who fixes fights.	
Somebody Up There Likes Me	1956	Biographical	Two-time Oscar-winner based on life of Rocky Graziano, played by Paul Newman.	
The Square Jungle	1956	Drama	A grocery clerk (Tony Curtis) fights his way to the middleweight title.	
World in My Corner	1956	Drama	New Jersey boy (Audie Murphy) seeks fame, fortune to impress millionaire's daughter.	
The Leather Saint	1956	Drama	A young Episcopalian minister (John Derek) boxes to raise funds for his church.	
Monkey on My Back	1957	Biographical	Barney Ross's boxing career leaves him with a morphine habit.	
The Crooked Circle	1957	Drama	A sportswriter (Steve Brodie) helps a contender cope with criminals.	
And the Same To You	1960	Comedy	Film adaption of the 1958 ITV Play of the Week episode, "The Chigwell Chicken."	
Requiem for a Heavyweight	1962	Drama	A punchy fighter (Anthony Quinn) is betrayed by his manager (Jackie Gleason).	
Kid Galahad	1962	Musical	A young Catskills car mechanic (Elvis Presley) turns out to pack quite a punch.	
Legendary Champions	1968	Documentary	Harry Chapin's look at boxers of yesteryear.	
Urtain, el rey de la selva... o así	1969	Documentary	Film about future European heavyweight champion José Manuel Ibar. Notably features Spanish singer Marisol.	
The Great White Hope	1970	Romantic drama	Based on Jack Johnson, story of black prizefighter in early 20th century. Oscar-nominated performances by James Earl Jones and Jane Alexander.	
Fat City	1972	Drama	A broke, broken-down fighter (Stacy Keach) tries a comeback as a young one (Jeff Bridges) learns the ropes. Oscar nomination for Susan Tyrrell.	
All American Boy	1973	Drama	The young boxer Vic Bealer (Jon Voight) in search for some direction in his life.	
Muhammad Ali: The Greatest	1974	Documentary	Photographer William Klein's look at Muhammad Ali.	
Hard Times	1975	Drama	Illegal bare-knuckle bouts in Louisiana, starring Charles Bronson.	
Let's Do It Again	1975	Comedy	Bill Cosby and Sidney Poitier as Atlanta men who rig a match for a good cause.	
Rocky	1976	Drama	Academy Award winner for Best Picture about a Philadelphia pug (Sylvester Stallone) who gets a once-in-a-lifetime opportunity.	
The Greatest	1977	Drama	Biographical film with Muhammad Ali as himself.	
Every Which Way but Loose	1978	Comedy	A trucker (Clint Eastwood) with a pet orangutan fights bare-knuckle brawls for money.	
Matilda	1978	Comedy	A promoter (Elliott Gould) pits a man against a boxing kangaroo.	
Movie Movie	1978	Comedy	Spoof of old boxing films, with palooka Harry Hamlin managed by George C. Scott.	
The Champ	1979	Drama	Remake of '30s melodrama about a child who worships a has-been boxer (Jon Voight).	
The Main Event	1979	Comedy	Headstrong woman (Barbra Streisand) owns contract of cocky boxer (Ryan O'Neal).	
Penitentiary	1979	Drama	Blaxploitation story set in a prison, featuring Leon Isaac Kennedy.	
Rocky II	1979	Drama	Rocky Balboa gets a rematch with Apollo Creed (Carl Weathers).	
Marciano	1979	Drama	Made for TV biopic about undefeated heavyweight Rocky Marciano.	
Ashita no Joe	1980	Animated	Japanese film.	
Raging Bull	1980	Biographical	Biopic on Jake LaMotta, with Oscar-winning performance by Robert De Niro.	
Any Which Way You Can	1980	Comedy	In sequel to 1978 film, mobsters coax bare-knuckle brawler Clint Eastwood into one more fight.	
Ashita no Joe 2	1981	Animated	Japanese film.	
Body and Soul	1981	Drama	Based on 1947 version, with Leon Isaac Kennedy and then-wife Jayne Kennedy.	
Penitentiary II	1982	Drama	Blaxploitation, sequel to 1979 film.	
Honeyboy	1982	Drama	Made for TV story with Erik Estrada and Morgan Fairchild.	
Rocky III	1982	Drama	Now champ, Rocky is challenged by vicious Clubber Lang, played by Mr. T.	
Dempsey	1983	Biographical	Treat Williams stars in made-for-TV biopic of Jack Dempsey.	
The Fighter	1983	Drama	A Vietnam vet turns to boxing to raise money.	
Tough Enough	1983	Drama	A "toughman" tournament is entered by a Texas musician (Dennis Quaid).	
The Sting II	1983	Comedy	Con man Jackie Gleason fixes a fight to double-cross a couple of crooks.	
Boxer	1984	Drama	Indian film.	
Rocky IV	1985	Drama	Rocky goes to the Soviet Union to battle Ivan Drago (Dolph Lundgren).	
Streets of Gold	1986	Drama	Two amateur boxers are trained by a Russian (Klaus Maria Brandauer).	
Teen Wolf Too	1987	Comedy	Sequel to werewolf comedy, this time starring Jason Bateman.	
Heart	1987	Drama	A punchy fighter gets set up by a shady promoter (Steve Buscemi).	
Split Decisions	1988	Drama	Gene Hackman as a trainer and father of two totally different sons.	
Triumph of the Spirit	1988	Drama	In Auschwitz concentration camp, a Jewish boxer (Willem Dafoe) fights for his life.	
Homeboy	1988	Drama	Mickey Rourke as a down-and-out boxer who risks death in the ring.	
Kaboria	1990	Drama	A young man dreams of representing his country in boxing at the Olympics but fails to achieve his goal. However, he establishes boxing rings to promote the sport.	
Rocky V	1990	Drama	A bankrupt Balboa trains up-and-coming heavyweight (real-life boxer Tommy Morrison).	
Rocky Plus V	1991	Comedy	A Filipino movie about a title character (Vic Sotto) who decides to compete in boxing matches to support five orphaned children he rescued from the orphanage; a parody to an American movie Rocky V.	
Diggstown	1992	Drama	A con man (James Woods) wagers his fighter can defeat 10 men in 24 hours.	
Gladiator	1992	Drama	Cuba Gooding, Jr. and James Marshall take part in illegal fights.	
Night and the City	1992	Drama	A shyster (Robert De Niro) defies a mobster to become a boxing promoter.	
Tyson	1995	Biographical	HBO biopic of Mike Tyson (played by Michael Jai White), co-starring George C. Scott.	
The Great White Hype	1996	Comedy	An out-of-shape champ steps into the ring against an out-of-his-league chump.	
When We Were Kings	1996	Documentary	Oscar-winner on 1974 fight between Muhammad Ali and George Foreman.	
Somebody Up There Likes Me	1996	Drama	Aaron Kwok as a kickboxer who fights to the death in the ring.	
The Boxer	1997	Drama	Daniel Day-Lewis as an Irish boxer recently released from prison.	
Don King: Only in America	1997	Biographical	An ex-con becomes a famous promoter, with Ving Rhames as King.	
The Kid	1997	Drama	A teen boxes while keeping it a secret from his parents. Stars Rod Steiger.	
Legionnaire	1998	War	Frenchman (Jean-Claude Van Damme) wins fight he was told to lose, joins Foreign Legion.	
Play It to the Bone	1999	Comedy	Best friends (Antonio Banderas, Woody Harrelson) fight each other in Las Vegas.	
Rocky Marciano	1999	Biographical	A television film with Jon Favreau portraying the undefeated champ.	
On the Ropes	1999	Documentary	A coach takes three young boxers under his wing.	
The Hurricane	1999	Biographical	False imprisonment of Rubin "Hurricane" Carter, played by Oscar nominee Denzel Washington.	
Thammudu	1999	Drama	A wayward youth takes up boxing in place of his injured elder brother. A Telugu film.	
A Fighter's Blues	2000	Drama	Hong Kong film shot in Thailand.	
The Opponent	2000	Drama	An abused woman learns to defend herself, then turns pro.	
King of the World	2000	Biographical	A television film with Terrence Howard as young Cassius Clay.	
Girlfight	2000	Drama	A young woman from Brooklyn (Michelle Rodriguez) trains to become a boxer.	
Price of Glory	2000	Drama	A trainer (Jimmy Smits) teaches three of his sons how to fight.	
Ali	2001	Biographical	A dramatization of Muhammad Ali's success and controversy, with Will Smith.	
Bakit 'Di Totohanin	2001	Romantic comedy-drama	A Filipino romantic comedy tells story of a woman (Judy Ann Santos) who is forced to get into a boxing match to win back her family's gym, which her drunkard grandmother lost in a bet. Desperate to win, she meets a boxing trainer and her love interest (Piolo Pascual) who helps her learn all the skills to win the fight.	
Carman: The Champion	2001	Action	A former boxing champion is blackmailed back into the ring.	
Undisputed	2002	Drama	Heavyweight champ fights a fellow prison inmate. Ving Rhames and Wesley Snipes co-star.	
Joe and Max	2002	Biographical	The 1930s rivalry between heavyweights Joe Louis and Max Schmeling.	
Beautiful Boxer	2002	Drama	Biographical film about a transsexual fighter from Thailand.	
Champion (Korean: 챔피언)	2002	Drama	Biographical South Korean film directed by Kwak Kyung-taek, about South Korean boxer Duk Koo Kim, portrayed by Yu Oh-seong.	
Hajime No Ippo: Champion Road	2003	Animated	Japanese film.	
Hajime No Ippo: Mashiba Vs Kimura	2003	Animated	Japanese film.	
Million Dollar Baby	2004	Drama	Oscar-winner for Best Picture and Best Actress about a trainer (Clint Eastwood) who reluctantly teaches a poor waitress (Hilary Swank) how to fight.	
Against the Ropes	2004	Drama	Based on a true story; Meg Ryan as manager of a young fighter (Omar Epps).	
The Calcium Kid	2004	Mockumentary	Orlando Bloom in a satire of boxing films.	
Shadowboxing	2005	Drama	Russian film about boxer Artyom Kolchin.	
Cinderella Man	2005	Biographical	Depression-era comeback of heavyweight contender James J. Braddock, starring Russell Crowe; three Oscar nominations.	
Fighting Tommy Riley	2005	Drama	A boxer and a gay manager clash, with tragic consequences.	
Ring of Fire: The Emile Griffith Story	2005	Documentary	A look at a welterweight champ who killed an opponent in the ring.	
Unforgivable Blackness: The Rise and Fall of Jack Johnson	2005	Documentary	Emmy-winner by Ken Burns about Jack Johnson's battles in and out of ring.	
Pacquiao: The Movie	2006	Biographical	A look at the life and career of Manny Pacquiao.	
Rocky Balboa	2006	Drama	Sixth in the Rocky series, with widower Rocky stepping into ring one more time.	
Undisputed II: Last Man Standing	2006	Action	Sequel to 2002 film but with entirely new cast.	
Annapolis	2006	Drama	Boxing story set at Naval Academy starring James Franco.	
Shadowboxing 2: Revenge	2007	Drama	Russian sequel to 2005 film about boxer Artyom Kolchin.	
Jump In!	2007	Family	Disney Channel comedy on Golden Gloves boxer's kid in rope-jumping contest.	
Poor Boy's Game	2007	Drama	Tempers and racial tensions flare in Nova Scotia story, starring Danny Glover.	
Apne	2007	Drama	Bollywood film.	
Miracle on 1st Street	2007	Comedy	South Korean film.	
Muay Thai Chaiya	2007	Drama	Thai film.	
Resurrecting the Champ	2007	Drama	A sportswriter believes homeless man (Samuel L. Jackson) is former boxing star.	
The Hammer	2007	Comedy	A 40-year-old carpenter (Adam Carolla) gets shot at U.S. Olympic boxing team.	
Blue Blood	2007	Documentary	Five Oxford students attempt to make Amateur Boxing Club.	
Shamo	2007	Documentary	Adaptation of the manga of the same name	
Assault in the Ring	2008	Documentary	A controversial 1983 fight between Billy Collins Jr. and Luis Resto, in which trainer Panama Lewis tampered with Resto's gloves, causing injuries so severe Collins never fought again.	
Joe Louis: American Hero... Betrayed	2008	Documentary	An HBO production profiling boxing legend Joe Louis	
Facing Ali	2009	Documentary	A look at the life of Muhammad Ali as told from the perspectives of many of his opponents.	
Muhammad and Larry	2009	Documentary	Made for TV as part of ESPN's 30 for 30 series. Examines 1980 fight between Ali and Larry Holmes.	
Phantom Punch	2009	Biographical	Ving Rhames' portrayal of former heavyweight champ Sonny Liston.	
From Mexico with Love	2009	Action/drama	Kuno Becker portrays a worker with boxing great abilities.	
The Fighter	2010	Biographical	Story of Micky Ward (Mark Wahlberg) and half-brother Dicky Eklund (Christian Bale). Oscars for Bale and Melissa Leo.	
Max Schmeling	2010	Biographical	A look back at 1930s German heavyweight who twice fought Joe Louis.	
One Night in Vegas	2010	Documentary	Made for TV as part of ESPN's 30 for 30 series. Explores friendship between Mike Tyson and Tupac Shakur, leading up to Shakur's 1996 murder after Tyson's fight with Bruce Seldon.	
La Yuma	2010	Drama	Nicaraguan Film	
Lahore	2010	Drama	Bollywood film.	
Always	2011	Drama	A romantic South Korean film about a quiet male kickboxer and a cheerful blind woman.	
Shadowboxing: Final Round	2011	Drama	Third installment in Russian film trilogy.	
Ashita no Joe	2011	Drama	Japanese film.	
The Real Rocky	2011	Documentary	Made for TV as a follow-up to ESPN's 30 for 30 series. Profiles Chuck Wepner, the real-life inspiration for Rocky Balboa.	
Knockout	2011	Drama	A janitor (Steve Austin) teaches boxing skills to a student who's up against bullies.	
Real Steel	2011	Science fiction	Boxing robots, starring Hugh Jackman.	
Klitschko	2011	Documentary	Lives of Ukraine brothers who both became world heavyweight champions.	
26 Years: The Dewey Bozella Story	2012	Documentary	Made for TV as a follow-up to ESPN's 30 for 30 series. Profiles Dewey Bozella, who found purpose in boxing while imprisoned for 26 years.	
When Ali Came to Ireland	2012	Documentary	Irish film about how Muhammad Ali was persuaded to make his first visit to the country for a 1972 fight, and depicting his later interactions with Ireland.	
Grudge Match	2013	Comedy	Washed-up boxers (Robert De Niro, Sylvester Stallone) square off one last time.	
No Más	2013	Documentary	Made for TV as part of ESPN's 30 for 30 series. Examines controversial ending to No Más Fight between Sugar Ray Leonard and Roberto Durán.	
Muhammad Ali's Greatest Fight	2013	Drama	A dramatization of the champion's refusal to serve in Vietnam.	
The Trials of Muhammad Ali	2013	Documentary	Another look at the champion's refusal to fight in Vietnam, also focusing on his conversion to Islam.	
I Am Ali	2014	Documentary	Explores the life of Muhammad Ali, with a starting point of personal voice recordings made by Ali himself in the 1970s.	
Maan Karate	2014	Comedy	A man takes part in a boxing tournament to impress his sports-loving girlfriend, despite knowing nothing about boxing. An Indian Tamil film.	
Mary Kom	2014	Biographical	An Indian biopic about five-time World Boxing Champion and Olympic bronze medalist Mary Kom.	
Manny	2014	Documentary	On life and career of longtime champion Manny Pacquiao.	
Chasing Tyson	2015	Documentary	Made for TV as part of ESPN's 30 for 30 series. Explores the years Evander Holyfield spent trying to arrange his first fight with Mike Tyson.	
Creed	2015	Drama	Evolution of the Rocky series, with Rocky serving as trainer for Apollo Creed's son.	
Kid Kulafu	2015	Biographical	Story of Manny Pacquiao's youth and his amateur career; serves as a prequel to Pacquiao: The Movie.	
Mard Payak	2015	Biographical	Biopic about legendary Muay Thai fighter and short-term world WBC champion Samart Payakaroon.	
Mr. Calzaghe	2015	Documentary	On undefeated champion Joe Calzaghe and relationship with his father and trainer Enzo.	
Shah	2015	Drama	Shah is a 2015 Pakistani biographical sports film directed and written by Adnan Sarwar based on the Story of Pakistani Boxer, Hussain Shah, who won Bronze during the 1988 Seoul Olympics.	
Southpaw	2015	Drama	A boxer (Jake Gyllenhaal) loses his wife, then loses custody of his daughter.	
Caring and Killing	2015	Drama	An up-and-coming boxer must face his past and present demons with the help of his coach	
Bleed for This	2016	Biographical	The story of Vinny Paz (Miles Teller), focusing especially on his comeback from a broken neck suffered in an auto accident.	
Chuck	2016	Biographical	Another look at Chuck Wepner, focusing on 1975 fight with Muhammad Ali.	
Hands of Stone	2016	Biographical	A dramatization of Roberto Durán's career, featuring Robert De Niro.	
Uppercut	2016	Drama	A young boxer raised in Queens rises up the ranks.	
Irudhi Suttru	2016	Drama	Indian film about a boxing coach training a young woman who sells fish.	
The Happiest Day in the Life of Olli Mäki	2016	Biographical	Dramatization of a 1962 fight in Helsinki between a featherweight from Finland and the American star Davey Moore.	
Chaamp	2017	Drama	An Indian Bengali language movie, about a boxer's rise, fall and struggles.	
Mukkabaaz	2017	Drama	A lovestory of a boxer who also faces several other hardships.	
42 to 1	2018	Documentary	Made for TV as part of ESPN's 30 for 30 series. Chronicles the shocking knockout of previously unbeaten Mike Tyson by journeyman Buster Douglas in 1990.	
Creed II	2018	Drama	Adonis Creed facing the son of the fighter who killed his father in the ring.	
Pariah: The Lives and Deaths of Sonny Liston	2019	Documentary	Made-for-TV examination of the rise, fall, and untimely death of Sonny Liston.	
Knuckle City	2019	Crime, Drama	An aging, womanizing professional boxer and his career-criminal brother take one last shot at success and get more than they've bargained for.	
Doda	2019	Biographical	This first Balochi language Pakistani feature boxing film for cinemas in Pakistan all time.	
In Full Bloom	2020	Drama	An American boxer defends his honor, as he faces off against an undefeated Japanese champion.	
Sarpatta Parambarai	2021	Sports, Drama	Set in a village where boxing is a cult championship. A boxing fan, who made his entry successful, turned into a henchman and also an unfit boxer. Did he make his successful career again?	
Toofaan	2021	Action, Drama	An Indian Hindi-language film about a boxer rise, fall and struggle. Based on the plot of 2017 Bengali Film Chaamp	
Untold: Deal with the Devil	2021	Documentary	The life of American female boxer Christy Salters and her ex-husband's attempt to murder her.	
Almighty Zeus	2022	Action	A young boxer goes viral after fighting off the attacker of a hate crime.	
Mister Knockout	2022	Drama	Biopic about Soviet olympic champion Valeri Popenchenko.	
Big George Foreman	2023	Drama	Biopic about heavyweight champion George Foreman.	
Creed III	2023	Drama	Most recent entry in the Rocky series, with Adonis Creed fighting a childhood friend and former boxing prodigy.	
Untold: Jake Paul the Problem Child	2023	Documentary	Jake Paul's change in career from social media influencer to boxer.	
Ellyas Pical	2024	Biographical	Prime Video biopic about the first Indonesian world champion Ellyas Pical.	
The Featherweight	2024	Drama	Biopic on the late career comeback of featherweight champion Willie Pep, the winningest boxer in the history of the sport.	
The Fire Inside	2024	Biographical	Biopic about Claressa "T-Rex" Shields.	
Kid Snow	2024	Drama	A film set in 1970s Western Australia during the final days of tent boxing troupes.	
Daveed	2025	Action	An Indian Malayalam-language film about a middle-aged bouncer who faces a life-changing rivalry with Turkish boxer	
Alappuzha Gymkhana	2025	Comedy	An Indian Malayalam-language film about a group of friends in Alappuzha who join coaching for amateur boxing, to secure college seats through grace marking	
Christy	2025	Biographical	Biopic about Christy Martin.	
I Play Rocky	2026	Biographical	Biopic about Sylvester Stallone and his creation of the 1976 film, Rocky	

== Highest grossing boxing films ==
The following is a list of highest grossing boxing films.

98% of the films have been released since the 1940s, and all have had a cinematic run since 1931. Rocky is the most frequent franchise on the list with 9 entries. The top 9 films are among the highest-grossing sports films of all time.

Highest-grossing films
Rank	Title	Worldwide gross	Year	Ref
1	Rocky IV	$300,473,716	1985	
2	Real Steel	$299,268,508	2011	
3	Creed III	$276,148,615	2023	
4	Rocky III	$270,000,000	1982	
5	Rocky	$225,000,000	1975	
6	Million Dollar Baby	$216,763,646	2004	
8	Creed II	$214,215,889	2018	
9	Rocky II	$200,182,160	1979	
10	Creed	$174,178,883	2015	
11	Rocky Balboa	$155,929,020	2006	
12	The Fighter	$129,190,869	2010	
13	Rocky V	$119,946,358	1990	
14	Every Which Way but Loose	$104,268,727	1978	
15	Southpaw	$91,970,827	2015	
16	Ali	$87,812,729	2001	
17	The Hurricane	$73,956,241	1999	
18	Any Which Way You Can	$70,687,344	1980	
19	The Champ	$65,000,000	1979	
20	Grudge Match	$44,907,260	2013	
21	The Main Event	$42,800,000	1979	
22	Hard Times	$26,500,000	1975	
23	Raging Bull	$23,406,558	1980	
24	Annapolis	$17,496,992	2006	
25	The Boxer	$16,534,578	1997	
26	Miracle on 1st Street	$16,062,566	2007	
27	Undisputed	$14,946,150	2002	
28	Let’s Do It Again	$11,800,000	1975	
29	The Great White Hope	$9,325,000	1970	
30	Gladiator	$9,223,441	1992	
31	Play It to the Bone	$8,678,812	1999	
32	The Fire Inside	$8,104,331	2024	
33	The Great White Hype	$8,008,255	1996	
34	Teen Wolf Too	$7,888,703	1987	
35	Bleed for This	$7,171,320	2016	
36	Always	$6,941,450	2011	
37	Against the Ropes	$6,596,511	2004	
38	The Sting II	$6,347,072	1983	
39	Night and the City	$6,202,957	1992	
40	Big George Foreman	$6,031,202	2023	
41	The Kid from Brooklyn	$5,490,000	1946	
42	Hands of Stone	$4,978,353	2016	
43	Diggstown	$4,800,000	1992	
44	Body and Soul	$4,700,000	1947	
45	City Lights	$4,250,000	1931	
46	The Long Gray Line	$4,100,000	1955	
47	Penitentiary	$4,000,000	1979	
48	Gentleman Jim	$3,842,000	1942	
49	The Greatest	$3,600,000	1977	
50—	The Quiet Man	$3,800,000	1952	

== See also ==
- List of sports films
- List of highest-grossing sports films
