= Aaron Pryor vs. Alexis Argüello II =

Boxing match

The Rematch
- Date: September 9, 1983
- Venue: Caesars Palace, Paradise, Nevada, U.S.
- Title(s) on the line: WBA and The Ring super lightweight titles

Tale of the tape
Boxer	Aaron Pryor	Alexis Argüello
Nickname	The Hawk	El Flaco Explosivo ("The Explosive Thin Man")
Hometown	Cincinnati, Ohio, U.S.	Managua, Nicaragua
Purse	$2,250,000	$1,750,000
Pre-fight record	33–0 (31 KO)	74–6 (60 KO)
Age	27 years, 10 months	31 years, 4 months
Height	5 ft 6 1/2 in (169 cm)	5 ft 10 in (178 cm)
Weight	140 lb (64 kg)	139 lb (63 kg)
Style	Orthodox	Orthodox
Recognition	WBA and The Ring; Super Lightweight Champion	WBA; No. 5 Ranked Light Welterweight; The Ring; No. 1 Ranked Light Welterweight; 3-division world champion

Result
- Pryor wins via 10th-round knockout

Aaron Pryor vs. Alexis Argüello II, billed as The Rematch, was a professional boxing match contested on September 9, 1983, for the WBA and The Ring super lightweight titles.

== Background ==
On November 12, 1982, reigning WBA super lightweight champion Aaron Pryor had faced three-division world champion Alexis Argüello in a thrilling fight in which Pryor scored a 14th-round knockout to earn the victory. Talks of a rematch began almost immediately with Arguello being quoted in Sports Illustrated as saying that he "owed" Pryor a "debt I'm going to pay back." Arguello's manager Bob Miller would then file a protest with the WBA, claiming Pryor had taken illegal substances during the fight on the basis that his trainer Panama Lewis had been picked up by HBO cameras telling cornerman Artie Curley to grab "the one I mixed" in regards to a water bottle. Curley, Lewis and Pryor denied any wrongdoing, claiming that they had only mixed peppermint schnapps and Perrier with regular water to help settle Pryor's upset stomach. As neither fighter had submitted post-fight samples, Miller admitted that he did not expect to win his protest and simply had filed the protest in hopes that it would hasten a rematch.

The rematch would not be immediate, however, as Argüello would first return to the ring on February 26, 1983, with a victory over Vilomar Fernandez in what was expected to be tune-up to his rematch with Pryor, which both fighters had verbally agreed to, but had not yet announced. Just prior to his fight against Fernandez, Argüello would officially vacate his WBC lightweight title and move up to the super lightweight division full-time. Pryor was then mandated by the WBA to first face their number-one ranked mandatory challenger Kim Sang-hyun. On April 2, 1983, Pryor would easily defeat Sang-hyun via third-round knockout with Pryor's promoter Dan Duva calling Sang-hyun possibly "the worst contender I've ever seen fight for a title."

Shortly after Pryor's victory over Sang-hyun, Pryor and Argüello's respective promoters, Duva and Shelly Finkel, would announce that the rematch had been agreed to and would tentatively happen that year in mid-July. However, the WBA initially refused to sanction the fight as Argüello was not among its ranked super lightweight contenders. In order to gain a WBA ranking, Argüello would have to defeat Claude Noel on April 24, which he would, knocking out Noel in the third-round. In June, the rematch was officially announced to take place on September 9, 1983. Originally, both fighters were to first headline a boxing card on July 24 in which Pryor would face Reyes Cruz and Argüello would take on Billy Costello in non-title tune-up bouts, but contractual problems led to the event's cancellation, with the Pryor–Argüello continuing on as planned for September 9.

Two months prior to the fight, the WBA once again threatened that they would not sanction the bout due to concerns about Argüello's weight while also hinting that they would punish Pryor if he attempted to continue on with the fight without the WBA's sanctioning. After around of month of uncertainty, the WBA would finally sanction the fight and instilled Argüello as their number-five ranked super lightweight contender.

Both fighters had changed the head trainers they had for their first fight. Argüello had previously been trained by the renowned Eddie Futch, but parted ways with him after losing to Pryor with Argüello blaming Futch for the loss by accusing him of overtraining him. Initially replacing Futch with then-Sugar Ray Leonard assistant trainer Janks Morton, Argüello would switch to Lupe Sanchez for the rematch with Pryor.

Pryor, meanwhile, lost his trainer due to events beyond his control. In late June, several weeks after the fight was announced, Panama Lewis was banned from boxing after it was discovered that he had removed the padding from the gloves of Luis Resto prior to his fight with Billy Collins Jr.. With Lewis no longer an option, Pryor turned to former Larry Holmes trainer Richie Giachetti, but the two had a falling out and Giachetti was dismissed and replaced with Emanuel Steward two weeks before the fight. Steward was given a $1.5 million payday to train Pryor on short notice.

== Fight Details ==
Pryor got off to a great start, scoring a knockdown just 38 seconds into the first round after connecting with a straight right hand to Argüello's jaw, though Argüello got back to his feet quickly. Argüello would rebound in the second and third rounds, winning both on the judge's scorecards. However, Pryor would score a second early knockdown in the fourth round when he landed three consecutive hooks to send Argüello down to the canvas. Argüello would again get back up quickly, but was hurt and barely hung on as Pryor dominated the remainder of the round. At the conclusion of the round, a dazed Argüello went to the wrong corner before realizing his error and returning to his own. Like he had after the first knockdown, Argüello would rebound and fought well until the eight round when referee Richard Steele took a point away from Argüello due to repeated low blows. Pryor regained control of the fight following the foul as Argüello appeared tired in the ninth and tenth. Midway through the tenth round, a series of punches sent Argüello down for the third time. Argüello would not attempt to get back to his feet, instead remaining seated as Steele counted him out, giving Pryor the knockout victory at 1:48 of the round.

== Fight card ==
Confirmed bouts:

Weight Class	Weight		vs.		Method	Round	Notes
Super Lightweight	140 lbs.	Aaron Pryor (c)	def.	Alexis Argüello	KO	10/15	^{note 1}
Super Featherweight	130 lbs.	Rocky Lockridge	def.	Cornelius Boza-Edwards	UD	10
Middleweight	160 lbs.	Bobby Czyz	def.	Bert Lee	RTD	2/10
Heavyweight	200+ lbs.	Tony Tubbs	def.	Gordon Racette	UD	10
Heavyweight	200+ lbs.	Carl Williams	def.	Percell Davis	TKO	4/10
Middleweight	160 lbs.	Darrell Chambers	def.	Lamont Haithcoach	PTS	10
Featherweight	126 lbs.	Louie Espinoza	def.	Manny Juarez	TKO	5/6
Super Lightweight	140 lbs.	Vinny Pazienza	def.	Ricardo Moreno	TKO	3/6
Super Featherweight	130 lbs.	Tyrone Powell	def.	Roberto Cantu	MD	4
Heavyweight	200+ lbs.	Patrick Anderson	def.	Guy Seickowski	UD	4

^Note 1 For WBA and The Ring Super Lightweight titles

== Broadcasting ==
Country	Broadcaster
United Kingdom	ITV
United States	HBO

Preceded by vs. Kim Sang-hyun	Aaron Pryor's bouts 9 September 1983	Succeeded by vs. Nick Furlano
Preceded by vs. Claude Noel	Alexis Argüello's bouts 9 September 1983	Succeeded by vs. Pat Jefferson
