= The Duke Comes Back =

The Duke Comes Back may refer to

- The Duke Comes Back (novel), a 1933 novel by Lucian Cary
- The Duke Comes Back (film), 1937 film by Irving Pichel based on the novel
