= Unanimous decision =

Winning criterion in several full-contact combat sports

A decision (UD) is a winning criterion in several full-contact combat sports, such as boxing, kickboxing, Muay Thai, mixed martial arts and other sports involving striking and submission in which all three judges agree on which fighter won the match.

In boxing, each of the three judges keeps score (round by round) of which fighter they feel is winning (and losing). This only includes landed blows to the head or the body. In MMA, judges look for different criteria such as kicks, take-downs, punches, knees, elbows, cage control, submission attempts, and aggression. A decision is not required to be unanimous for a boxer or mixed martial artist to be given a victory. In the modern era of Olympic boxing, UD is utilized more often than other outcomes, including stoppages. Unanimous decision should not be confused with a majority decision or split decision.

== History ==
In the early days of combat fighting, winners were determined only when one party was unable to continue the fight. The National Sporting Club started to promote professional glove fighting. It introduced the use of officials and their capacity to declare the winner of a fight. Officials began using a scoring system to determine the winner of the fight, and this made unanimous decisions a logical outcome.

Any combat sports decision has the potential to be overturned. Some reasons for this may include counting errors, misdeclaration, and retroactive disqualification due to rule violations. One notable case of a unanimous decision being overturned is a 1983 fight between Luis Resto and Billy Collins Jr, where Resto won the fight, but was later revealed to have fought with tampered gloves. The discovery of the tampered gloves turned the Unanimous Decision into a no contest.

== Notable unanimous decisions ==
Notable unanimous decisions
Date	Winner	Opponent	Notes
March 8, 1971	Joe Frazier	Muhammad Ali	For WBA, WBC, and vacant The Ring heavyweight titles
January 28, 1974	Muhammad Ali	Joe Frazier	Retained NABF heavyweight title
March 7, 1987	Mike Tyson	James Smith	Retained WBC heavyweight title; Won WBA heavyweight title; Heavyweight unification series
June 11, 2009	Georges St-Pierre	Thiago Alves	Defended the UFC Welterweight Championship.
May 2, 2015	Floyd Mayweather Jr	Manny Pacquiao	Retained WBA (Unified), WBC, and The Ring welterweight titles; Won WBO welterweight title

== Controversial unanimous decisions ==
Controversial unanimous decisions
Date	Winner	Opponent	Notes
April 10, 2010	B.J. Penn	Frankie Edgar	Lost the UFC Lightweight Championship.
February 4, 2012	Carlos Condit	Nick Diaz	Won the interim UFC Welterweight Championship.
July 2, 2017	Jeff Horn	Manny Pacquiao	Lost WBO welterweight title
February 12, 2023	Islam Makhachev	Alexander Volkanovski	Defended the UFC Lightweight Championship.
February 8, 2020	Jon Jones	Dominick Reyes	Defended the UFC Light Heavyweight Championship.

== Notable athletes ==
=== Boxing ===
- Floyd Mayweather Jr. – 20 wins by UD
- Muhammad Ali – 18 wins by UD
- Manny Pacquiao – 18 wins by UD
- Joe Louis – 9 wins by UD

=== MMA ===
- Merab Dvalishvili - 12 wins by UD
- Jon Jones – 9 wins by UD
- Anderson Silva – 9 wins by UD
- Georges St-Pierre – 10 wins by UD
- Kamaru Usman – 9 wins by UD

== See also ==
- 10 Point System
- Ultimate Fighting Championship
- Olympic Games
- Split decision
- Majority decision
- Knockout
