= Live Star Entertainment =

Production company

Live Star Entertainment, also known simply as Live Star, is a production company specializing in documentaries, live events, and corporate content. The company was founded in 2000 by Eric Drath. Based in New York City, Live Star has produced Emmy Award-winning documentaries, branded content, award shows, parades, concerts, and sporting events.

== Documentaries ==
Live Star Entertainment received its first Emmy Award for Assault in the Ring (HBO) in 2010. The company received its second Emmy Award for No Más (ESPN) in 2013, followed by an Emmy nomination for GameStopped (Hulu) in 2022.

Other projects include Renée (ESPN), MACHO: The Hector Camacho Story (Showtime), The Dream Whisperer (PBS), A More Perfect Union (FiveThirtyEight, Tribeca Film Festival), Here Now (ESPN), Robbed (ESPN), Tapia (HBO), In Search of Derrick Thomas (ESPN / SEC Network), Theodore Bikel: In the Shoes of Sholom Aleichem (PBS), Marvel & ESPN Films Present 1 of 1: Genesis (Netflix), Marvel & ESPN Films Present 1 of 1: Origins (Apple TV), and Marvel Tales to Astonish: Civil War (Marvel).

== Live events ==
Live Star Entertainment produces live sporting events including boxing, MMA, Muay Thai, lacrosse, and NHRA drag racing. Live Star has produced live shows for DAZN, Showtime, UFC Fight Pass, Fox Sports, SNY, AXS TV, and Top Rank Boxing.

The company also produces live concerts and has worked with artists including Prince, The Jonas Brothers, Jennifer Lopez, Barry Manilow, Imagine Dragons, Rihanna, Nelly Furtado, and Jamie Foxx.

Live Star Entertainment produces the St. Patrick's Day Parade Live from Dublin, the Broadcasting & Cable Hall of Fame, as well as other global live events.
