= Eric Drath =

American documentary filmmaker

- Education: Trinity-Pawling School; Columbia University (BA)
- Occupations: director, producer
- Awards: Sports Emmy Award (2010) Sports Emmy Award (2013)

Eric Drath is an American filmmaker who specializes in sports documentaries. He won the 2010 Sports Emmy Award for Outstanding Sports Documentary for directing and producing the documentary Assault in the Ring.

== Biography ==
Drath was born and raised in New York City. He graduated from Trinity-Pawling School in 1988 and received his B.A. from Columbia University in 1994. In college, he interned for ABC News. After graduating from Columbia, Drath moved to Atlanta to work for CNN and then back to New York for Fox News.

Having attended a boxing match in Yonkers, New York, Drath left Fox News and joined Joseph DeGuardia's promotional company to do publicity work before becoming an agent representing more than 40 boxers around the world.

Drath founded Live Star Entertainment in 2000, which specializes in live events, original content, and documentaries. He also began producing documentaries that focused on sports controversies.

His debut documentary Assault in the Ring won the 2010 Sports Emmy Awards for Outstanding Sports Documentary. Drath then directed the first ESPN 30 for 30 short film, Here Now, about Pete Rose. He also directed several other ESPN 30 for 30 films including the 2011 documentary Renee, which profiles the transsexual tennis player Renée Richards and her quest to enter the 1977 U.S. Open as the first transgender tennis player. Drath also directed 30 for 30 No Más, which won the 2013 Sports Emmy Award for Outstanding Sports Documentary Series.

Drath directed the 2020 documentary series Macho: The Hector Camacho Story on Puerto Rican boxer Héctor Camacho, and executive produced the 2021 Emmy-nominated documentary, GameStopped, covering the 2021 GameStop short squeeze.

Drath is a director of the upcoming documentary,The Dream Whisperer, which tells the story how Dick Barnett led the Tennessee State University basketball team to win three consecutive national titles.
