= Marvin Hagler vs. Roberto Durán =

1983 professional boxing match

- Date: November 10, 1983
- Venue: Caesars Palace, Paradise, Nevada, U.S.
- Title(s) on the line: WBA, WBC, IBF and The Ring undisputed middleweight titles

Tale of the tape
Boxer	Marvin Hagler	Roberto Durán
Nickname	"Marvelous"	"Manos de Piedra" ("Hands of Stone")
Hometown	Brockton, Massachusetts, U.S.	Panama City, Panama Province, Panama
Purse	$5,000,000	$1,500,000
Pre-fight record	57–2–2 (47 KO)	77–4 (58 KO)
Age	29 years, 5 months	32 years, 4 months
Height	5 ft 8 in (173 cm)	5 ft 7 1/2 in (171 cm)
Weight	157 1/2 lb (71 kg)	156 1/2 lb (71 kg)
Style	Southpaw	Orthodox
Recognition	WBA, WBC, IBF and The Ring undisputed Middleweight Champion	WBA; Super Welterweight Champion; The Ring; No. 2 Ranked Light Middleweight; 3-division world champion

Result
- Hagler wins via unanimous decision (142-144, 143-144, 145-146)

Marvin Hagler vs. Roberto Durán was a professional boxing match contested on November 10, 1983 for the WBA, WBC, IBF and The Ring undisputed middleweight titles.

== Background ==
The fight was televised live on closed circuit in the United States and (free of charge) on WAPA-TV in Puerto Rico, where it was worked by sportscaster Rafael Bracero. It was also shown days later in the USA for free on cable station HBO's HBO World Championship Boxing, with Barry Tompkins, Larry Merchant and Duran's archrival (and, later also, Hagler opponent) Sugar Ray Leonard working the HBO show.

The bout caused great expectations both among boxing and non-boxing fans alike, and Ring Magazine produced a rare, special issue about it which came out days before the fight. Other media outlets, such as Sports Illustrated, also covered the event.

Hagler came into the fight with 57 wins, 2 losses and 2 draws (ties), 48 of his wins being by knockout. For his part, Panama's Duran sported a record of 77 wins and 4 losses in 81 professional boxing contests, 58 of his wins by knockout.

The bout's presenter was Chuck Hull; its referee was Stanley Christodoulou of South Africa. Christodoulou, coincidentally, had also refereed Duran's fellow Latin and Central American Alexis Arguello's first attempt versus Aaron Pryor at becoming a four division world boxing champion, which had come almost a year before Hagler-Duran's date, on November 12, 1982, at Miami, Florida.

== The fight ==
The bout was the main event of a program that also included Freddie Roach's 10-round unanimous decision loss in a rematch fight to Louie Burke and a contest to determine Hagler-Duran's winner's next challenger, between American Frank "The Animal" Fletcher and Argentina's Juan Roldan, which was won by Roldan by a brutal, blistering sixth round knockout.

Hagler won the fight by a fifteen rounds unanimous decision.

Despite what boxing fans and experts expected, it was a largely tactical affair, with Duran unexpectedly boxing from outside (he is mostly remembered as an in-fighter) while Hagler awaited for his opportunities, picking his shots.

After 13 rounds, two of the judges had Duran one point ahead, and the other judge had it even. But Hagler dominated rounds fourteen and fifteen to forge ahead and retain his titles by a close but unanimous decision, the scores reading 146-145 (on judge Yusaku Yoshida's), 144-143 (on Ove Ovesen's) and 142-141 (on Guy Jutras') on the cards, all in favor of champion Hagler.

== Aftermath ==
Hagler then retained his title 4 more times, including victories over Roldan, over Hearns and John Mugabi before losing it on his final fight, to Ray Leonard on April 6, 1987. He retired with a record of 62 wins, 3 losses and 2 draws (ties), with 52 wins by knockout, after which he moved to Italy and became an actor, filming various movies in that European country and a commercial in the United States for Pizza Hut. He was inducted into the International Boxing Hall of Fame 14 years before Duran was, in 1993.

On the other hand, Duran lost on his very next fight to Hearns and retired immediately after that, but he made several comebacks afterwards. In 1989 he realized his dream of becoming a four division world champion (albeit being the third one, not the first one as he'd been had he won against Hagler; Hearns and Leonard were boxing's first and second four division world champions, respectively) winning the WBC middleweight title from Iran Barkley. Iran Barkley vs. Roberto Durán was named fight of the year by the magazine The Ring. Duran then had fights with Vinny Paz and Hector Camacho (twice each; Duran lost to both twice each by decisions) William Joppy-a third-round technical knockout loss for Joppy's WBA world Middleweight title- and a rubber match with Leonard (they had beaten each other once each before). Duran retired with 103 wins and 16 losses in 119 contests, 70 of those wins coming by knockout. Duran went on to record Salsa music albums as a singer and was in Argentina promoting one of his albums when he suffered a life-threatening car accident in 2000, which caused him to retire from boxing. In 2016, a movie about him, Hands of Stone, was released. That movie was based on a book about Duran written by American author Christian Giudice. Duran was inducted to the International Boxing Hall of Fame in 2007.

On November of 2023, boxing magazine Ring Magazine published an online special edition, commemorating the fight on its 40-years anniversary.

== Undercard ==
Confirmed bouts:

- Louie Burke W 10 Freddie Roach
- Juan Roldan KO 6 Frank Fletcher
- Charlie ("White Lightning") Brown W 10 Frank Newton
- Luis Santana KO 2 Jesus Gonzalez (not to be confused with a 2000s boxer of the same name)

== Broadcasting ==
Country	Broadcaster
Australia	Seven Network
Canada	Superchannel
Mexico	Televisa
Philippines	MBS 4
United Kingdom	ITV
United States	HBO

Preceded by vs. Wilford Scypion	Marvin Hagler's bouts 10 November 1983	Succeeded by vs. Juan Roldán
Preceded by vs. Davey Moore	Roberto Durán's bouts 10 November 1983	Succeeded by vs. Thomas Hearns
