= Muhammad Ali vs. Joe Frazier II =

Boxing match

Coordinates: 40.7504°N 73.9935°W

Super Fight II
- Closed Circuit Poster
- Date: January 28, 1974
- Venue: Madison Square Garden, New York City, New York
- Title(s) on the line: NABF heavyweight title

Tale of the tape
Boxer	Muhammad Ali	Joe Frazier
Nickname	The Greatest	Smokin'
Hometown	Louisville, Kentucky	Beaufort, South Carolina
Purse	$850,000	$850,000
Pre-fight record	43–2 (31 KO)	30–1 (25 KO)
Age	32 years	30 years
Height	6 ft 3 in (191 cm)	5 ft 11 1/2 in (182 cm)
Weight	212 lb (96 kg)	209 lb (95 kg)
Style	Orthodox	Orthodox
Recognition	NABF heavyweight champion	Former undisputed heavyweight champion

Result
- Ali wins via 12-round unanimous decision (6-5, 7-4, 8-4)

Muhammad Ali vs. Joe Frazier II, billed as Super Fight II, was a professional boxing match contested on January 28, 1974, for the NABF heavyweight title. The second of the three Ali–Frazier bouts, it took place at Madison Square Garden in New York City.

== Background ==
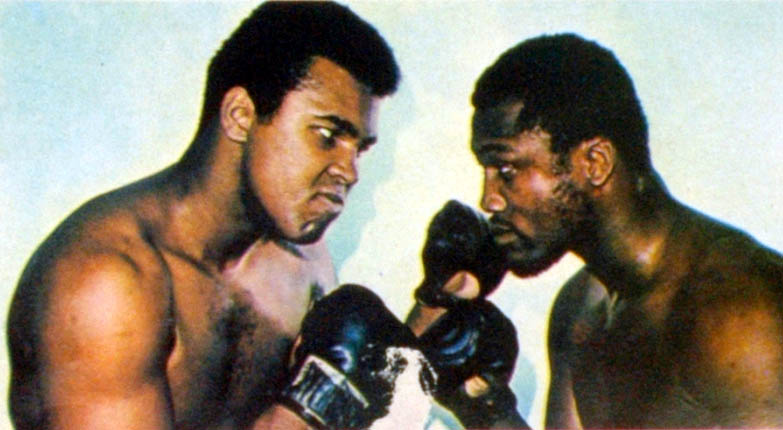
Promotional photo

The fight, promoted as Super Fight II, was a rematch of the 1971 Fight of the Century, in which Frazier retained his WBA and WBC heavyweight titles and became the first pro boxer to defeat Ali. In 1973, George Foreman had dethroned Frazier. Besides being a chance for Ali to avenge his 1971 loss, the 1974 bout would set up a shot for the winner against Foreman.

On January 17, 1974, Ali and Frazier appeared together on The Dick Cavett Show, where there was both humor and obvious tension – which included the removing of jackets and mock blows between the pair. Things dramatically escalated, however, on January 23, when Ali and Frazier visited the ABC studios in New York City five days before the rematch to review their first fight (the "Fight of the Century") for ABC's Wide World of Sports. During their critique, Ali began trash talking Frazier and calling him "ignorant" for mentioning Ali had visited the hospital after the bout, as he had put Frazier in one for a full month afterwards. This denigration enraged Frazier, who stood up from his seat and squared up to a seated Ali, repeating, "Why you call me ignorant? How am I ignorant?" While Frazier was not looking at Ali and studio crew and his entourage tried to calm him down, Ali grabbed Frazier by the neck to force him to sit down, which broke out into a fight on the studio floor. Both boxers were subsequently fined for their outburst, and significant drama added to the countdown to their rematch in the ring. Ali was a slight favorite going in.

== The fight ==
The fighting was uneven, with flashes of excellence marred by Ali initiating 133 clinches, many by holding Frazier's head and pushing down on his neck, which referee Tony Perez did not regard as a violation under the rules. Ali's clinching dominated the fight. Many rounds were close and difficult to score and punch volume was unusually low for the two fighters, and for heavyweight boxers in general. Ali ended up landing 181 punches to Joe Frazier's 172, with Ali leading on jabs 37 to 5 and Frazier on power punches 167 to 144; by contrast, in their first bout Frazier landed 378 punches (365 power) and Ali 330 (195 power). Frazier and Ali each landed more punches than the other in 5 of the 12 rounds, with 2 rounds even. Frazier was the more accurate puncher, landing 42% of his blows to Ali's 25%. In the opinion of sportswriters Bob Cannobio and Lee Groves: "Had they fought this way three years earlier, boxing would have been greatly harmed and the world probably never would have seen a second fight, much less a third."

Tactically, instead of fighting flat-footed in the middle of the ring and "fighting Frazier's fight" as in their first, meeting, Ali came out dancing in his traditional "Float like a butterfly, sting like a bee" form. In the three years since he had been stripped of his titles and banned from the sport he had been able to recover much of the ringmanship on his toes he had lost since his 1967 professional ban. Still, he was older, heavier, and slower...as was Frazier. In hopes of making more contact with the relentlessly bobbing and weaving Frazier, he often employed a new punching style, flurries of a half-hook half-upper cuts coming from both sides. As in the first fight, Ali attempted to prevent Frazier from working inside, tying up the shorter man by holding him behind the neck with his left hand while keeping Frazier's vaunted left tied up with the other. This pattern of Ali punching in flurries followed by clinching, and stifling Frazier's advances and leaving him no room to throw his punches through neck-grabs and half-headlocks, dominated most of the fight, at times earning rounds of boos from fight fans. Explaining why he did not even warn Ali, referee Tony Perez explained, "The only violation is if you [hold] and hit at the same time. Ali was holding but he wasn't hitting."

Ali won a close but unanimous decision, with referee Tony Perez scoring it 6–5–1, judge Tony Castellano 7–4–1, and judge Jack Gordon 8–4–0.

== Aftermath ==
While some fans and experts then and now consider Ali–Frazier II to be the least interesting and hyped of their three fights, it provided flashes of excellence by both boxers, and was described by the Associated Press as "...another great match between two different types of fighter, the slugger versus the master craftsman". Extremely anticipated at the time, the fight lacked the absolute drama of the first bout. By winning, Ali got a shot at Foreman, surprisingly winning The Rumble in the Jungle in October 1974 in Kinshasa, Zaire. With the Ali–Frazier score at one win apiece, the stage was set for a tie-breaker, the 1975 Thrilla in Manila, in which Ali retained his world title.

=== Scorecard ===
Round	1	2	3	4	5	6	7	8	9	10	11	12	Total
Tony Perez (referee)	A	A	F	–	A	A	F	F	A	F	A	F	Ali, 6–5–1
Tony Castellano (judge)	A	A	A	–	F	A	F	F	A	F	A	A	Ali, 7–4–1
Jack Gordon (judge)	A	A	F	A	A	F	F	F	A	A	A	F	Ali, 8–4–0

== Undercard ==
Confirmed bouts:

== Broadcasting ==
Country	Broadcaster
Mexico	Televisa
Philippines	KBS 9
United Kingdom	BBC

== Reviews ==
Preceded by vs. Rudie Lubbers	Muhammad Ali's bouts 28 January 1974	Succeeded by vs. George Foreman
Preceded by vs. Joe Bugner	Joe Frazier's bouts 28 January 1974	Succeeded by vs. Jerry Quarry
