= The Gordon Sisters Boxing =

1901 American film

- Produced by: Edison Manufacturing Co.
- Starring: Bessie and Minnie Gordon
- Release date: May 6, 1901
- Country: United States
- Language: Silent

The Gordon Sisters Boxing is an American short black-and-white silent film produced by the Edison Manufacturing Company.

Edison's film catalogue describes the film as follows: "Champion lady boxers of the world. Here we depict two female pugilists that are really clever. They are engaged in a hot and heavy one-round sparring exhibition, which is photographed against a very pleasing background, consisting of a park, with marble entrance and walk, and beautiful trees and shrubbery. The exhibition is very lively from start to finish; the blows fall thick and fast, and some very clever pugilistic generalship is exhibited."

In an analysis of boxing in the context of modernism, Irene Gammel argues that the scene's "symmetry and beauty [gesture] towards the artfulness of boxing as a cultivated sport." In addition, she argues that the women's choreographed movement shows "their boldly modern female physicality and sportsmanship."

== See also ==
- List of boxing films
