= Thomas Hearns vs. Roberto Durán =

Professional boxing match contested on June 15, 1984

Malice at the Palace
- Date: June 15, 1984
- Venue: Caesars Palace, Paradise, Nevada, U.S.
- Title(s) on the line: WBC and The Ring super welterweight titles

Tale of the tape
Boxer	Thomas Hearns	Roberto Durán
Nickname	The Hitman	Manos de Piedra ("Hands of Stone")
Hometown	Detroit, Michigan, U.S.	Panama City, Panama
Purse	$1,850,000	$1,850,000
Pre-fight record	38–1 (32 KO)	77–5 (58 KO)
Age	25 years, 7 months	32 years, 11 months
Height	6 ft 1 in (185 cm)	5 ft 7 1/2 in (171 cm)
Weight	153 3/4 lb (70 kg)	154 lb (70 kg)
Style	Orthodox	Orthodox
Recognition	WBC and The Ring; Super Welterweight Champion; 2-division world champion	WBA; Super Welterweight Champion; The Ring; No. 1 Ranked Light Middleweight; 3-division world champion

Result
- Hearns wins via 2nd-round KO

Thomas Hearns vs. Roberto Durán, billed as Malice at the Palace, was a professional boxing match contested on June 15, 1984 for the WBC and The Ring super welterweight titles.

== Background ==
Roberto Durán had captured the WBA super welterweight title after defeating the reigning champion Davey Moore on June 16, 1983. Durán's first defense of his newly won title was put on hold when it was announced two weeks after his victory that he would be moving up to the middleweight division to challenge Marvin Hagler for Hagler's undisputed middleweight crown. After losing a close unanimous decision to Hagler in November, Durán would opt to return to the super welterweight division. Durán was scheduled to make a mandatory defense against the WBA's number-one ranked contender Mike McCallum with promoter Dan Duva negotiating with both fighters in February 1984. However, in a press conference the following month, Durán announced that he would instead face WBC super welterweight titlist Thomas Hearns and that he would vacate his title if the WBA would not grant an extension that would allow him to make his mandatory defense after his fight with Hearns rather than before. After the WBA refused an extension, Durán announced in early May that he would indeed vacate the title and move forward with his fight against Hearns.

The bout was originally scheduled to take place in The Bahamas, but when the site proved incompatible due to both logistical and financial issues, it was instead moved to Caesars Palace on the Las Vegas Strip. Caesars Palace had become available when a heavyweight title bout between Larry Holmes and Gerrie Coetzee scheduled for June 8 was cancelled by the site due to breach of contract three weeks before it was to take place.

== The fight ==
From the outset, Hearns was able to use his height and reach advantage to prevent Durán from fighting him on the inside as he wanted to. The champion kept Durán away with repeated use of his left jab, then cut Duran’s eye with a left hook counter at the two-minute mark of the first round.

With thirty seconds remaining in the opening round, Hearns dropped Durán with a hard right hand. Referee Carlos Padilla administered the standing eight count to the challenger and allowed him to continue, but Durán would go down again following a barrage of punches from Hearns that would end with a hard shot to the body. A dazed Durán would rise again as the round closed, but had to be guided to his corner by his trainer.

In round two, Hearns immediately resumed the attack on Durán and laid into him with several vicious combinations. Durán went down for a third time at the 1:07 mark of the second, after which Padilla immediately stopped the fight. Hearns retained his championship, becoming the first fighter to knock Durán out in the Panamanian champion's career to that point (although his second fight against Sugar Ray Leonard, the infamous No Más fight, was recorded as a technical knockout despite Duran electing to retire from the fight).

== Aftermath ==
Durán decided to retire from boxing for the second time following the fight. However, as with his prior retirement, it did not last long and he resumed fighting in early 1986 as a middleweight by knocking out two journeymen fighters. He would only suffer two more knockout defeats before finally retiring for good in 2000, once against Pat Lawlor in 1991 and once against WBA middleweight champion William Joppy in 1998.

After knocking out Fred Hutchings in his next defense of the WBC title, Hearns decided to move up to challenge Marvin Hagler for the middleweight world championship. In a hard-hitting contest, Hearns lost by TKO in the third round. He would make one more defense of his super welterweight title in 1986, defeating Mark Medal by TKO. Then, in 1987, Hearns would move up in weight to challenge Dennis Andries for the WBC's light heavyweight championship, knocking him down six times to win by TKO; he would follow this up by winning the WBC middleweight championship by defeating Juan Roldán later that year.

== Fight card ==
Confirmed bouts:

Weight Class	Weight		vs.		Method	Round	Notes
Super Welterweight	154 lb	Thomas Hearns (c)	def.	Roberto Durán	KO	2/12	^{Note 1}
Lightweight	135 lb	Jimmy Paul	def.	Alvin Hayes	KO	6/12
Heavyweight	200+ lb	Tony Tucker	def.	Eddie López	KO	9/10
Middleweight	160 lb	Duane Thomas	def.	Tony Harrison	TKO	8/10
Super Middleweight	168 lb	Errol Christie	def.	Stan White	KO	5/10
Super Lightweight	140 lb	Arturo Frias	def.	Jose Torres	UD	10/10
Flyweight	112 lb	Joey Olivo	def.	Oscar Cristerna	TKO	6/10
Super Featherweight	130 lb	Louie Espinoza	def.	Dwight Pratchett	UD	8/8

^Note 1 For WBC, The Ring and lineal Super Welterweight titles

== Broadcasting ==
Country	Broadcaster
Australia	Seven Network
Canada	Superchannel
Mexico	Televisa
Philippines	MBS 4
United Kingdom	ITV
United States	CBS

Preceded by vs. Luigi Minchillo	Thomas Hearns's bouts 15 June 1984	Succeeded by vs. Fred Hutchings
Preceded by vs. Marvin Hagler	Roberto Durán's bouts 15 June 1984	Succeeded by vs. Manuel Zambrano
