= Duke of Chicago =

1949 film by George Blair

- Directed by: George Blair
- Written by: Albert DeMond
- Based on: novel The Duke Comes Back by Falkland L. Cary (as Lucian Cary)
- Produced by: Stephen Auer (associate producer)
- Starring: Tom Brown; Audrey Long; Grant Withers
- Cinematography: John MacBurnie
- Edited by: Cliff Bell Sr.
- Music by: Stanley Wilson
- Production company: Republic Pictures
- Distributed by: Republic Pictures
- Release date: March 15, 1949
- Running time: 61 minutes
- Country: United States
- Language: English

Duke of Chicago is a 1949 American sports drama film directed by George Blair and starring Tom Brown, Audrey Long and DeForest Kelley. Produced and distributed by Republic Pictures the film portrays a retired boxer, Jimmy Brody (Brown), who leaves his boxing career for his fiancée but is lured back into a one-off fight against a current champion due to financial difficulties.

Based on the 1933 novel The Duke Comes Back by Lucian Cary, Duke of Chicago was one of several films made on the back of the critical and commercial success of boxing pictures Body and Soul and Champion. However, the film was largely panned by critics, described as "slow-paced and seemingly a lot longer than its fifty-nine minutes."

== Plot ==
Chicago former boxing champion Jim Brody is lured from his retirement and loving relationship with fiancée Helene back to the ring to face the current champion, Steve "Killer" Bronski.

Brody's financial difficulties and failing private business have left him desperate for money, with Helene leaving on their planned cruise around the world without him in anger at his attempts to cancel it. He accepts the fight with the financial assistance of gangster Tony Russo. Helene, learning this, ends her relationship with Brody via letter, but it is intercepted by an associate of Brody before it reaches him.

Russo pressures Brody to throw the fight for financial gain through the bookies. Brody achieves eventual victory, though being badly beaten during the fight. He is later assaulted and nearly murdered by Russo's men while recuperating in hospital. Russo and his gang are arrested. Brody, now without Helene, falls for and becomes engaged to her sister, Jane.

== Cast ==
- Tom Brown as Jimmy Brody
- Audrey Long as Jane Cunningham
- Grant Withers as Tony Russo
- DeForest Kelley as Ace Martin
- Lois Hall as Helene Cunningham

== See also ==
- List of boxing films
