= Davey Moore vs. Roberto Durán =

Boxing match

- Date: June 16, 1983
- Venue: Madison Square Garden, New York City, New York, U.S.
- Title(s) on the line: WBA super welterweight title

Tale of the tape
| Boxer | Davey Moore | Roberto Durán |
| Nickname | Sensational | Manos de Piedra ("Hands of Stone") |
| Hometown | The Bronx, New York, U.S. | Panama City, Panama |
| Purse | $600,000 | $400,000 |
| Pre-fight record | 12–0 (9 KO) | 76–4 (57 KO) |
| Age | 24 years | 32 years |
| Height | 5 ft 10 in (178 cm) | 5 ft 7 1/2 in (171 cm) |
| Weight | 154 lb (70 kg) | 153 lb (69 kg) |
| Style | Orthodox | Orthodox |
| Recognition | WBA; Super Welterweight Champion; The Ring; No. 3 Ranked Light Middleweight | WBA; No. 7 Ranked Super Welterweight; The Ring; No. 8 Ranked Light Middleweight; 2-division world champion |

Result
- Durán wins via eighth-round technical knockout

Davey Moore vs. Roberto Durán was a professional boxing match contested on June 16, 1983, for the WBA super welterweight title.

== Background ==
In January 1983, former welterweight champions Roberto Durán and Pipino Cuevas met in a non-title bout at the LA Sports Arena. Durán dominated the fight and scored a fourth-round knockout victory that put him in line for a title shot against the undefeated reigning WBA super welterweight champion Davey Moore. Despite Durán's impressive victory, he was still perceived to be on the downside of his career having lost to little-known Kirkland Laing only nine months prior and the 23-year old Moore expressed doubt that the soon-to-be 32-year old Durán would be a match for him, infamously stating "Was that Duran looking so good or Cuevas so bad?"

The fight was originally scheduled to take place on May 27 in Bophuthatswana, South Africa with a Ray Mancini–Kenny Bogner WBA lightweight title fight as the co-main event, but the event was cancelled after Mancini was forced to pull out with a fractured collarbone. Two weeks later, the Moore–Durán fight was rescheduled for June 16 (Durán's 32nd birthday) at Madison Square Garden in Moore's native New York City. Durán underwent a rigorous training schedule with his longtime trainer Ray Arcel proclaiming "Right now, he looks better than I've seen him in several years" while Durán himself stated "What will beat Moore is not only my experience, but my conditioning. If I had to pick between them, I would say my conditioning." Durán admitted that a loss to Moore would possibly lead to his retirement saying "If I lose, I'll probably retire, but I'm not thinking about losing the fight. I'm stronger, more mature, more experienced and I'm training more seriously than at any time in my career."

Moore had successfully defended his title three times, defeating all three opponents by knockout and was installed as 5–2 favorite by oddsmakers and was confident in his ability to defeat his opponent claiming that Durán was "over the hill but he still has his name and beating him will take me to the big money fights. I don't expect a very long fight, it might even be over in a round."

== The fight ==
Durán started the fight aggressively and controlled most of the fight from there on. At the end of the first round Durán threw a jab that Moore attempted to dodge, but the thumb of Durán's glove instead inadvertently poked Moore in his right eye, injuring it immediately and hindering Moore throughout the rest of the fight. Durán continued to be the aggressor in the second round and bloodied Moore's nose with a straight right. Durán slowed his attack during the third and fourth rounds allowing Moore to become the aggressor but Durán still boxed effectively and Moore's right eye was almost entirely shut and he was now also bleeding from his lip by the end of the fourth. Finally, after dominating Moore over the entire fight, Durán sent Moore down to the canvas with 15 seconds left in the seventh round. Clearly hurt, Moore was able to get up at the count of eight and was saved by the bell, though he was so dazed he went to Durán's corner rather than his own and had to be directed by the referee to get to his own. To start the eighth Moore tried to clinch Durán, but Durán was able to free himself and continued to punish Moore's head and body. After two minutes of Durán landing punches at will and with Moore offering little offensively or defensively and his face bloodied and both eyes almost shut, Moore's trainer Leon Washington threw a blood-soaked white towel in the ring to signify surrender, but referee Ernesto Magaña did not acknowledge it causing Top Rank executive Jay Edison to enter the ring leading to the fight being stopped and Durán was named the winner by technical knockout.

== Aftermath ==
Duran became just the 7th fighter in boxing history to win world titles in three weight divisions.

== Fight card ==
Confirmed bouts:

| Weight Class | Weight | | vs. | | Method | Round | Notes |
|---|---|---|---|---|---|---|---|
| Super Welterweight | 154 lbs. | Roberto Durán | def. | Davey Moore (c) | TKO | 8/15 | ^{Note 1} |
| Super Lightweight | 140 lbs. | Alfredo Escalera | def. | Gene Hatcher | UD | 10/10 |
| Middleweight | 160 lbs. | Luis Resto | vs. | Billy Collins Jr. | NC | 10/10 |

^Note 1 For WBA Super Welterweight title

== Broadcasting ==
| Country | Broadcaster |
|---|---|
| Australia | Seven Network |
| Canada | Superchannel |
| Mexico | Televisa |
| Philippines | MBS 4 |
| United Kingdom | ITV |
| United States | CBS |

| Preceded by vs. Gary Guiden | Davey Moore's bouts 16 June 1983 | Succeeded by vs. Monte Oswald |
| Preceded by vs. José Cuevas | Roberto Durán's bouts 16 June 1983 | Succeeded by vs. Marvin Hagler |
