= Joseph DeGuardia =

American boxing promoter and lawyer

- Photograph of DeGuardia
- Other name: Joe DeGuardia
- Occupations: Boxing promoter & lawyer

Joseph DeGuardia is an American boxing promoter and lawyer. He is the founder and CEO of Star. Being the son of former professional boxer Joseph DeGuardia Sr., DeGuardia competed in the ring himself and achieved a successful amateur career. Among other titles, DeGuardia won the New York Golden Gloves Championship in 1988 while still attending law school at Hofstra University. In 1991, he took over the community-based Morris Park Boxing Club, which his father had founded, and relocated it to a new location.

== Biography ==
Joe DeGuardia followed in his father's footsteps, Joe DeGuardia Sr., a professional boxer in the 1940s and 50s. His mother is Mildred DeGuardia and Joe is married to Lisa with 2 sons. The younger DeGuardia went on to have a distinguished career in the amateurs (winning the NY Golden Gloves.

In his college and law school years, DeGuardia continued to box. He received his Undergraduate Degree from Fordham University and Graduate (Juris Doctor) from Hofstra Law School. During his time at Hofstra University, DeGuardia won the welterweight division (147 lbs, open division) in the 1988 New York City Golden Gloves tournament. He defeated pro-boxer Larry Barnes in the tournament's championship fight.

Upon graduation from Law school, DeGuardia went to work as a prosecutor for the Bronx District Attorney's Office. In 1993, DeGuardia went into private practice and founded his own law office in the Bronx, New York.

=== Star Boxing Inc. ===
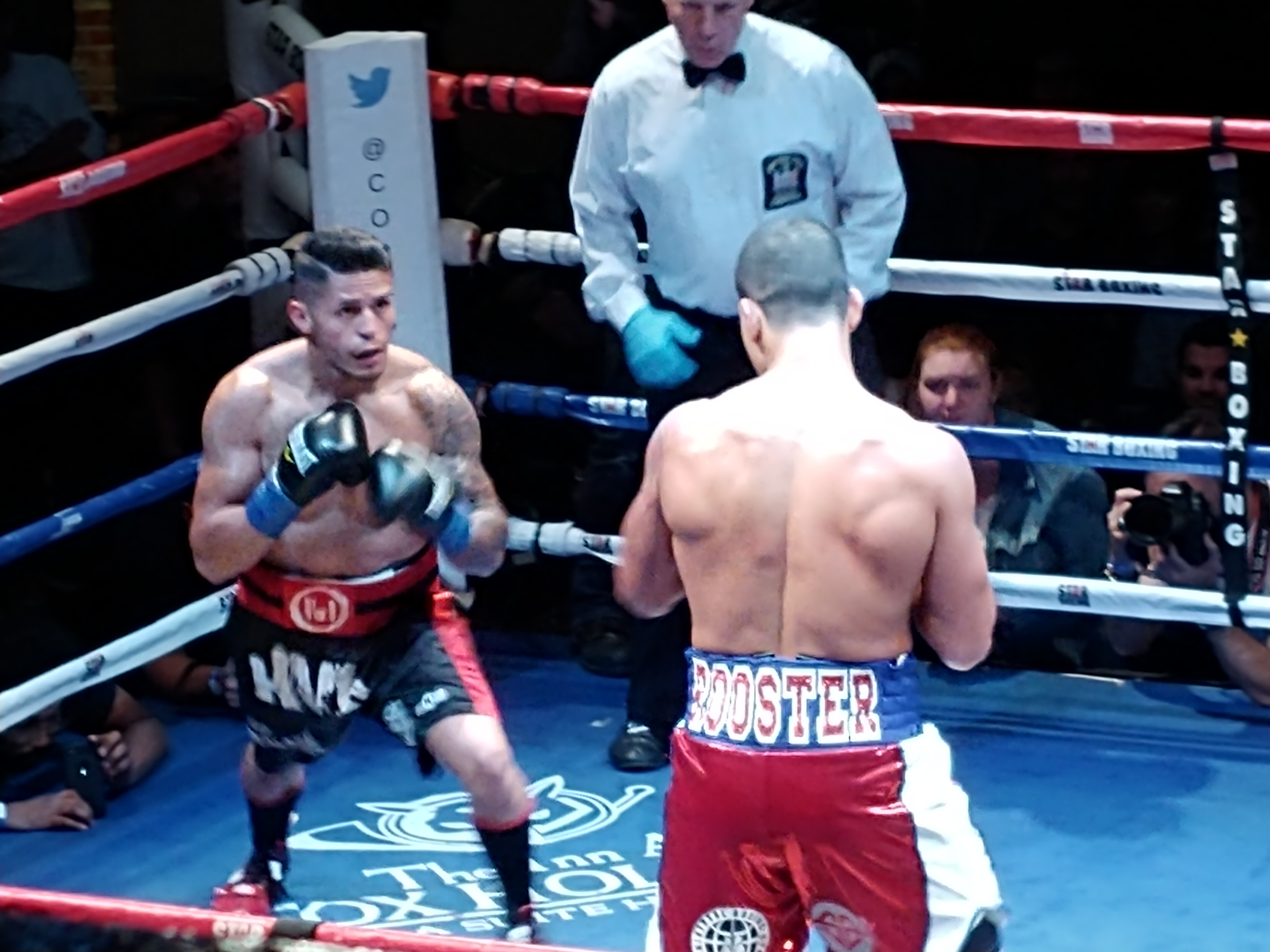
Johnny Hernandez v Danny Gonzalez, Rockin' Fights 32

Joe DeGuardia began promoting boxing in 1992, founding Star Boxing, which is a boxing promotional company originally based in the Bronx, NY. For the last 27 years, DeGuardia has been professionally active in the boxing industry promoting. Past and present, boxers promoted by Star Boxing include former World Champion Antonio Tarver, Two-Time World Champion and 2008 US Olympian Demetrius Andrade, former WBO Jr. Welterweight Champion Chris Algieri, former IBF Welterweight Champion Joshua Clottey, former WBF Heavyweight Champion Carlos Takam and former WBC International Light Heavyweight champ Joe Smith Jr. In 2016, DeGuardia moved Star Boxing's offices to White Plains, NY.

Since 2012, Star Boxing has developed a big presence in Long Island, NY. In the town of Huntington, the promotional company has used The Paramount as a home-base with their series of fight shows called Rockin' Fights. Professional fighters that participated in the Rockin' Fights series included Chris Algieri, Cletus Seldin, and Joe Smith Jr.

== Awards and honors ==
=== Connecticut Boxing Hall of Fame ===
In 2013, DeGuardia was inducted into the Connecticut Boxing Hall of Fame as a boxing promoter. Alongside the lawyer and promoter, the inductees for that year were former world title challenger Luigi "Kid Dynamite" Campurato and Israel "Pito" Cardona. Additionally, part of the class of inductees included broadcaster Al Bernstein, referee Johnny Callas, and USA Boxing Administrator Ronald Roy.

=== New York Boxing Hall of Fame ===
In 2016, Joe DeGuardia was inducted into the New York State Boxing Hall of Fame. The event was sponsored by Ring 8 and was held at Russo's On the Bay in Howard Beach, New York. Accompanying DeGuardia in the 2016 class was former Star Boxing fighter and welterweight champion, Aaron Davis. In addition to Davis, some notable posthumous inductees were Rocky Graziano, Hector Camacho, and Howard Cosell.

=== Miscellaneous awards ===
- Ring 10 honored Joe DeGuardia in 2013 with the Lifetime Dedication Award at their Third Annual Extravaganza at the Marina Del Rey in Throgs Neck (Bronx, NY).
- On December 13, 2015, Ring 8 named Joe DeGuardia "Promoter of the Year" at their Annual Holiday Awards at Russo's on the Bay in Howard Beach, Queens.

== Senate testimony ==
DeGuardia was called upon to testify as an expert in the United States Senate in Washington, D.C. by Arizona Senator John McCain. The hearing were related to the state of boxing and formulation of federal legislation regarding the sport. DeGuardia was asked and espoused a pension fund for boxers in the United States. McCain felt like the best way to build a pension plan for boxers would be to tap into the small percentage of funds that are derived from television boxing shows. More specifically, these funds come mostly from pay-per-view events. DeGuardia was asked to speak about his opinion on the issue and the impact on boxers and club shows.

== Car accident ==
Joe DeGuardia survived a major car accident while on his way home from Rockin' Fights 4 at The Paramount. He was on the Long Island Expressway in his Mercedes-Benz when he was hit head-on by a Honda that was going the wrong way on the Expressway, on exit ramp 41.
