= The Duke Comes Back (novel) =

1933 Novel

The Duke Comes Back is a 1933 novel by Lucian Cary which tells the story of a retired boxing champion lured out of retirement for one final bout. It served as the basis for two films, The Duke Comes Back in 1937 and Duke of Chicago in 1949.
