= No contest (sports) =

Fight ended for reasons beyond the fighter's control

No contest (abbreviated "NC") is a technical term used in some combat sports to describe a fight that ends for reasons outside the fighters' hands, without a winner or loser. The concept carried over to professional wrestling, where it is far more common, usually scripted to further a feud, generate heat and/or protect a push.

The term has extended to team sports, as an alternative to forfeit, denote results of a game cancelled outside the participating teams' control.

== Boxing ==
In the 19th and early parts of the 20th century, many countries (and some parts of the United States) officially banned boxing, and occasionally the police would step in to shut down the bouts (which, although unlawful, were still sanctioned by regional boxing commissions). Since boxing is now lawful virtually anywhere in the world, the number of fights called no contest has decreased dramatically since the beginning of the 20th century. Referees were also known to stop bouts during this period when they felt bouts were too slow due to lack of aggression from one or both boxers.

In the modern game, the various rules that dictate whether a fight should be called a no contest, a disqualification, or a knockout differ between countries and boxing organizations. Rules in the United States now dictate that any bout which ends prior to the completion of the 4th round, due to an accidental headbutt, is to be declared a no contest. Prior to this, accidental headbutt stoppages had been ruled a technical draw. Most other no contests in boxing occur when unusual circumstances, which would include instances such as a power outage, rain (in outdoor contests), weather protocol including lightning and tornado warnings (the latter is possible indoors), the ring collapsing, or an unexpected injury caused by something outside of the boxer's control.

One good example of an unusual circumstance occurred in 1983, on the undercard of the fight where Roberto Durán beat Davey Moore for the World Jr. Middleweight title at the Madison Square Garden, when Luis Resto and Billy Collins Jr boxed ten rounds. Resto appeared to win the fight cleanly, and the scorers gave the match to Resto. But it was later discovered that he had cheated by tampering with his gloves before the fight. The injuries Collins received affected his sight, and, upon finding out what Resto and his corner had done, the New York State Athletic Commission decided to change the result of the fight to a no contest.

On August 28, 1998, Bernard Hopkins fought Robert Allen in Las Vegas, Nevada, United States. The fight was ruled a no contest when Hopkins was injured after he was accidentally pushed out of the ring by referee Mills Lane as Lane was trying to break up a clinch.

== Mixed martial arts ==
No contest decisions in mixed martial arts (MMA) are usually declared when an accidental illegal strike (the rules on which differ from each organization) causes the recipient of the blow to be unable to continue, that decision being made by the referee, doctor, the fighter or his corner. Each fighter receives a NC counted in their record and is scored as neither a win nor a loss. Blows from intentional illegal strikes that force a fighter to be unable to continue are generally not declared a no contest, but as a win and a loss by disqualification for the appropriate fighters.

In 2007, a controversial no contest decision in MMA occurred at The Ultimate Fighter 5 season finale between Rob Emerson and Gray Maynard. Maynard knocked himself temporarily unconscious during a takedown of Emerson, who then submitted due to an aggravated injury of the ribs, each being unaware that the other fighter could not continue. While awaiting the official announcement, many believed that Gray Maynard would be declared the winner, because Emerson tapped out and it appeared that Maynard was unharmed. The NC decision was made due to both fighters being unable to continue. A replay of the incident, taken from a different angle, later confirmed that Maynard had indeed knocked himself out and needed assistance to stand back up.

At Legends of Fighting Championship 25: Breaking Point in May 2008, Tyler Bryan and Shaun Parker knocked each other out simultaneously with two legal punches. Referee Shonie Carter, surprised and unsure of protocol, ultimately signaled for a no-contest rather than a draw. Both fighters became popular video stars and ended their brief fighting careers later that year.

In the case of a title fight that is ruled a no contest, the champion will retain their title, but it will not be counted as a title defense. An example of this can be found in the second bout between Daniel Cormier and Jon Jones at UFC 214. Jones was originally awarded a victory and won the title, but the decision was overturned due to a failed drug test. The title was returned to Cormier, who entered the bout as champion, but the bout is not considered as one of his title defenses at light-heavyweight. Another example of this can be also found in UFC 321 main event between the heavyweight champion Tom Aspinall and the title challenger Ciryl Gane. At 4:35 of the first round, Gane accidentally poked Aspinall in the eye, which resulted in Aspinall being unable to continue fighting. Due to this accidental foul, the bout was declared no contest and Aspinall retained the title.

== Team sports ==
A 2023 National Football League game between the Cincinnati Bengals and the Buffalo Bills was officially ruled a no contest after Bills safety Damar Hamlin suffered a sudden cardiac arrest and collapsed on the field. The game was suspended with 5:58 remaining in the first quarter, with the Bengals leading 7–3, and was officially ruled a no contest three days later. Hamlin survived, and as of September 2024, still plays for the Bills.

The National Collegiate Athletic Association introduced a no contest designation in the 1980s after several college basketball games were impacted by poor weather that prevented the visiting team from reaching the venue. Intended as a substitute for forfeits, the policy was expanded to all circumstances that might render a team unable to arrive at the game outside of their control, such as accidents or contractual disputes. For games between schools in the same athletic conference, the conference leadership could also opt to rule a forfeit for the absent team though it would not affect either team's overall record.

The 2021 NCAA Division I men's basketball tournament game between the Oregon Ducks and the VCU Rams was ruled as a "no contest" by the NCAA due to COVID-19 issues affecting VCU. The Ducks advanced to the next round of the tournament. Later that year, in the 2021 College World Series, the game between the Vanderbilt Commodores and the NC State Wolfpack was declared as a "no contest" due to COVID-19 protocols. This led to Vanderbilt advancing to the finals, and to NC State being eliminated.
