= The Duke Comes Back (film) =

1937 film by Irving Pichel

- Theatrical release poster
- Directed by: Irving Pichel
- Screenplay by: Adele B. Buffington; Edmund Seward
- Based on: the novel The Duke Comes Back by Lucian Cary
- Produced by: Herman Schlom (associate producer)
- Starring: Allan Lane; Heather Angel; Genevieve Tobin
- Cinematography: Harry Neumann
- Edited by: Ray Snyder
- Music by: Alberto Colombo (musical director)
- Production company: Republic Pictures Corporation
- Distributed by: Republic Pictures
- Release date: November 29, 1937
- Running time: 64 minutes
- Country: United States
- Language: English

The Duke Comes Back is a 1937 American drama film directed by Irving Pichel and written by Adele B. Buffington and Edmund Seward. It is based on the 1933 novel The Duke Comes Back by Lucian Cary. The film stars Allan Lane, Heather Angel and Genevieve Tobin. It was released on November 29, 1937, by Republic Pictures.

== Plot ==
Duke Foster dethrones boxing's heavyweight champion, then promptly announces his engagement to Susan Corbin, a high-society girl whose financier father, Arnold Corbin, disapproves of her choice in men. Susan's sensible sister Pauline persuades their father the marriage will be fine and becomes Duke's partner in a publishing business so that he can quit fighting. Four years pass and the Fosters have a son, Jimmy.

Arnold embezzles and loses $200,000 and faces prison. Duke decides to try to raise the money by boxing again. A corrupt promoter, Jim Watson, bets a bundle on Duke's opponent, Bronski, and has Susan and her son taken hostage. Duke is warned to lose the fight, but doesn't believe the threat is true. Al goes to the arena to shoot Duke before he can win the bout and lose Watson's wager, but Al is overpowered, Duke wins and his family is safe.

== Cast ==
- Allan Lane as Duke Foster
- Heather Angel as Susan Corbin Foster
- Genevieve Tobin as Pauline Corbin
- John Russell as Jimmy Foster
- Joseph Crehan as Pat Doyle
- Frederick Burton as Arnold Corbin
- Ben Welden as Barney
- Selmer Jackson as Jim Watson
- Clyde Dilson as Parke
- George Lynn as Al
- Victor Adams as Nick
- Art Lasky as Joe Bronski
- Snowflake as Snowflake
- Byron Foulger as Peters
- George Cooper as Janitor

== See also ==
- List of boxing films
