= Panama Lewis =

American boxing trainer (1945–2020)

Carlos "Panama" Lewis (November 4, 1945 – September 19, 2020) was a Panamanian-American boxing trainer. He was convicted of tampering with the gloves of Luis Resto for his fight against Billy Collins Jr. in 1983, which subsequently led to the end of Collins' boxing career. Collins suffered from depression and possibly committed suicide following the assault.

== Early career ==
Lewis was a disciple of trainer Chickie Ferrara. He was Roberto Durán's cornerman when Duran lost a unanimous decision against Wilfred Benítez in 1982.

During the early 1980s, he was considered one of the best trainers of his time, compared with Emanuel Steward and Lou Duva. The most noted boxer in his stable was light-welterweight champion Aaron Pryor. In 1982, Pryor fought Alexis Argüello. Before the fourteenth round, a cornerman held up a plastic water bottle, but HBO cameras caught Lewis yelling, "Not that bottle, the one I mixed." Pryor knocked out Arguello, but Lewis' comments fueled rumors that the bottle contained stimulants. Lewis said he "mixed some peppermint liquor with water because Pryor was suffering from stomach problems." Although Lewis was never formally sanctioned, the incident sullied his reputation, which was confirmed by his cheating discovered in subsequent fights.

It was later revealed in an interview with former Lewis-trained boxer Luis Resto in the Showtime documentary film Assault in the Ring, that Lewis would break apart pills used to treat asthma and pour the medicine into the water, giving Resto greater lung capacity and stamina in the later rounds of a fight.

== Resto–Collins controversy ==
The most notorious incident in Lewis's career took place on June 16, 1983. A fighter he was training, Luis Resto, was fighting undefeated prospect Billy Collins Jr. in a bout televised by ABC's Wide World of Sports. The fight was the undercard for a fight between Roberto Durán and Davey Moore.

Resto won in a 10-round unanimous decision over a bloody Collins. After the fight, Resto came to Collins' corner to shake hands with Collins' father and trainer, Billy Sr. When Billy Sr. grabbed Resto's hand, he discovered Resto's gloves were thinner than normal. Screaming that he thought the gloves had no padding, Collins Sr. demanded that the New York State Boxing Commission impound the gloves. An investigation found that the padding had been removed from each glove through holes made in the palm of the gloves. Collins suffered a torn iris and permanently blurred vision, ending his boxing career.

After an investigation, the New York State Boxing Commission determined Lewis had tampered with the gloves. On July 1, 1983, it permanently revoked Lewis' state boxing license. Since most state boxing commissions honor sanctions imposed by other states, this action had the effect of banning Lewis from ever having another official role in an American bout. Resto's license was suspended for at least one year; he never fought again. Resto's win was subsequently changed to a no contest.

In October 1986, Lewis and Resto were both put on trial and found guilty of assault, criminal possession of a weapon (Resto's hands) and conspiracy. Lewis was also found guilty of tampering with a sports contest. Prosecutors charged that since Lewis had deliberately removed the padding from Resto's gloves, the bout with Collins amounted to an illegal assault. Lewis was sentenced to six years in prison, Resto to three years. Lewis was released from prison in 1990.

Collins died on March 6, 1984, when he crashed his car into a culvert near his home in Antioch, Tennessee. Many think he may have committed suicide because he was unable to continue boxing as a result of the actions of Lewis and Resto.

Years later, during the filming of the 2008 documentary Assault in the Ring, Resto admitted that he knew Lewis had not only tampered with the gloves, but Lewis had also wrapped Resto's hands with modern medical plaster. Lewis wet the plaster material and used it as a layer in Resto's hand wraps, illegally increasing his punching power. He also said that Lewis had taken the padding out of his gloves on at least two other occasions. Resto also alleged that the plot centered around a large amount of money bet on himself, the underdog, by a third party who had met with Lewis prior to the fight.

Lewis maintained his innocence till his death and many of his defenders allege that someone instead removed the padding from Resto's gloves after the bout. For instance, an official with the New York State Boxing Commission left the gloves in his car after receiving them from the state boxing commission. However, this is belied by pictures of Collins' face after the bout; it was badly swollen, and many felt it was improbable a light puncher like Resto could have inflicted such damage on his own.

When confronted by Resto and Assault in the Ring director and producer Eric Drath, Lewis again denied any wrongdoing and said that it was cornerman Artie Curley who had wrapped Resto's hands. An agitated Lewis said that if Curley were alive today, "none of this would have happened to him."
