= Assault in the Ring =

- Directed by: Eric Drath
- Produced by: Eric Drath; Jenna Rosher
- Starring: Luis Resto; Panama Lewis
- Distributed by: Showtime
- Release date: April 2008 (Nashville Film Festival)
- Running time: 83 minutes
- Language: English

Assault in the Ring (formerly Cornered: A Life in the Ring) is a 2008 sports documentary film about a controversial boxing match held at Madison Square Garden on June 16, 1983. The film won the award for Best Sports Documentary at the 31st Sports Emmy Awards in 2010.

== Synopsis ==
The documentary examines a 1983 boxing match that took place between the undefeated fighter Billy Collins Jr. and Luis Resto. The fight was on the undercard occurring before the headline or "main event" between Multi-Division World Champion Roberto Durán and Davey Moore. Resto unexpectedly beat the highly touted Collins in a 10-round unanimous decision.

However, after the fight, Resto's gloves were found to be missing a significant amount of padding, which allowed Resto to increase the impact of his punches and effectiveness against Collins during the fight. This illegal tampering caused tremendous harm to Collins. Collins' suffered major eye injuries and his promising boxing career was finished. Nine months later, Collins died in an auto accident. Resto and his trainer Panama Lewis were sentenced to prison for illegal tampering with the gloves.

The documentary was shot by former boxing manager Eric Drath, who heard the story of Luis Resto from various boxers. Drath wanted to try to and exonerate Resto in the aftermath of the fight and Resto's incarceration and ban from boxing. Drath said he believed Resto when he told him he had no knowledge of the tainted gloves. In the course of the investigation Drath uncovered a transcript of a police interview Resto gave during the criminal investigation. In the transcript, which was not admitted into evidence during Resto's assault trial, Resto admitted that his trainer Panama Lewis had taken his gloves into the bathroom with Lee Black. When Drath, who was shooting the documentary, confronted Resto with this evidence and the transcript of his own police interview, Resto admitted that Lewis had indeed taken the gloves.

Resto admitted he knew during the course of the fight that the gloves had been tampered with. Resto then admitted he knew well before the fight that not only had the gloves been tampered with but that his hands were encased in plaster of paris, essentially turning his barely-padded fists into hardened cement casts, thus explaining the horrific damage he inflicted on Collins.

The documentary focuses on Resto admitting this knowledge to members of Collins' and his own family, and asking for forgiveness. In the course of this journey, which brought Resto from the Bronx to Virginia, and through Miami and Nashville, the documentary underscores the disparity between the lives of Resto and Panama Lewis. While Resto's life was in ruins after losing his family and career and spending ten years living in the basement of the gym where he used to train, Lewis remained active in boxing community and was still able to earn a good living as a trainer in the sport he was technically "banned" from. Despite being banned from boxing, Lewis was shown making professional appearances in the documentary. Lewis appeared at the press conference for the fight featuring Zab Judah, one of the fighters he unofficially trained. While Lewis was still accepted by some in the boxing community despite his past, Resto was shunned entirely (even within his own family). In the documentary, Lewis was shown wearing gold chains and watches while staying at Luxury hotels. This lifestyle was in stark contrast to Resto's humble lifestyle, which included riding a bus for seven hours to visit family.

Resto implicated Panama Lewis as the mastermind behind the conspiracy to taint the gloves, but many questions still remain concerning Lewis' motive for gambling his livelihood on glove tampering. While Resto's motives remain unclear, there were allegations that a cocaine dealer had wagered a large sum of money on Resto to win. Initially adamant that his trainer Lewis was the one who took the gloves into the bathroom, when confronted by Lewis in the parking lot of a gym, Resto appears to back off his allegations by stating that his boxing coach known as a cornerman Artie Curley was the one who wrapped at least one of his hands.

In addition to investigating Lewis and trying and failing to clear Resto's name, the documentary also speaks about the Collins family's unsuccessful lawsuit against the New York State Athletic Commission. The lawsuit was based on the fact that Resto's gloves were barely examined and Lewis was given privacy to do whatever was done to them, and the fact that Collins' injuries destroyed his life and led to his fatal car accident. The ambiguity of what "glove inspection standards" meant and the fact that Collins' death was technically separate from the injuries Resto inflicted on him meant no compensation was granted to the plaintiffs. The commission ruled Collins was permanently ineligible to return to boxing due to a torn iris inflicted by Resto; the documentary suggests that this was possibly done to keep Collins from getting back in the ring, which would have invalidated the insurance claim they had made against the boxing organization.

== See also ==
- Antonio Margarito § Tampered handwraps controversy
- List of boxing films
