= Billy Collins Jr. =

American boxer (1961–1984)

Personal information
- Nickname: Irish
- Born: William Ray Collins Jr. September 21, 1961 Nashville, Tennessee, U.S.
- Died: March 6, 1984 (aged 22) Antioch, Tennessee, U.S.
- Weight: Welterweight; Light middleweight

Boxing career
- Reach: 68.5 in (174 cm)
- Stance: Orthodox

Boxing record
- Total fights: 15
- Wins: 14
- Win by KO: 11
- No contests: 1

William Ray Collins Jr. (September 21, 1961 – March 6, 1984) was an American professional boxer who competed from 1981 to 1983. He was undefeated before his career was cut short after his final fight when he sustained serious injuries against Luis Resto in their ten-round bout. Aided by his trainer Panama Lewis, Resto used illegal, tampered gloves with an ounce of the gloves' cushioning removed, along with hand wraps that had been soaked in plaster of Paris.

== Early life ==
Billy Collins was born to a working class Irish family in Antioch, Tennessee. His father and manager, Billy Collins Sr. (1937–2018) was a welterweight professional boxer during the late 1950s and early 1960s who won 38 of his 56 professional fights. Collins Jr. followed his father's footsteps and started training with him from a very young age. Also a welterweight, Collins won his first 14 fights as a professional, among them a decision over future world title challenger Harold Brazier.

=== Luis Resto fight ===
Collins was matched against Puerto Rican journeyman Luis Resto at Madison Square Garden in New York on June 16, 1983, on the undercard of the Roberto Durán vs. Davey Moore light middleweight title fight. Collins entered the fight as a betting favorite but took a heavy beating for almost the whole fight and lost by a unanimous decision.

At the end of the fight, Collins' father, who was also his trainer, noticed that Resto's gloves felt thinner than normal and demanded that they be impounded. A subsequent investigation by the New York State Boxing Commission concluded that Resto's trainer, Panama Lewis, had removed an ounce of padding from each glove, making his punches harder and more damaging to Collins. The fight result was changed to a no contest.

Lewis' New York boxing license was permanently revoked, effectively banning him from any official role in American boxing for life. Resto was suspended indefinitely and never fought again. In 1986, Lewis and Resto were tried and convicted of assault, conspiracy, and criminal possession of a deadly weapon (Resto's plaster of paris wraps); prosecutors felt that Lewis' actions made the fight an illegal assault on Collins. Both served two and a half years in prison.

== Injuries and auto accident ==
In the Resto fight, Collins' eyes were swollen shut. He suffered a torn iris and permanently blurred vision, which left him unable to box again.

On March 6, 1984, Collins was killed when the car in which he and his best friend were driving crashed into a culvert near his home in Antioch, Tennessee, a suburb of Nashville. The autopsy showed he died a short time later at the scene of the accident. According to an account in Sports Illustrated, the crash was intentional.

== Legal action ==
In July 1983, Collins and his family sued Lewis, Resto, fight promoter Top Rank Boxing, the inspectors, the bout's referee and Everlast (the manufacturer of Resto's gloves) for gross negligence and loss of income. The suit against Everlast was dismissed by the Federal Court which found that there was no liability since the gloves had been tampered with after they were delivered by Everlast. Collins Sr. and Collins' widow Andrea then sued the New York State Boxing Commission for failing to protect Collins. The commission argued that the term "inspection" was so broad that there was no way to determine whether the fight's inspectors could have done more than they did. It also claimed that Top Rank actually hired the inspectors and bore more responsibility for their behavior. A court ruled in favor of the commission, and the court also noted that Collins' death ended any potential future damages. However, Collins' widow, now known as Andrea Collins-Nile, attempted to reopen the suit. The request was denied. The state subsequently changed its rules to prevent a repeat of what happened to Collins. The Collins family never saw any compensation.

== Further revelations by Resto ==
In 2007, Resto made a tearful apology to Collins-Nile for his role in the scheme unexpectedly during the making of a Showtime documentary about the fight. He also admitted that his hand wraps had been soaked in plaster of Paris before the fight. This caused them to harden into plaster casts like those used to set broken bones. The hand wraps were never confiscated and did not figure into the official investigation of the tampering incident. However, the combined effect of the plaster casts and unpadded gloves meant that Resto was effectively striking Collins with rocks. At a 2008 press conference, Resto not only admitted to knowing that Lewis had tampered with the gloves, but had done so at least twice before. The 1983 incident and subsequent aftermath is covered in the 2008 Showtime documentary Assault in the Ring.

== Professional boxing record ==
15 fights	14 wins	0 losses
By knockout	11	0
By decision	3	0
No contests	1	

No.	Result	Record	Opponent	Type	Round, time	Date	Location	Notes
15	NC	14–0 (1)	Luis Resto	UD	10	Jun 16, 1983	Madison Square Garden, New York City, New York, U.S.	Originally UD win for Resto, later ruled NC after he used tampered gloves and handwraps
14	Win	14–0	Fernando Fernandez	KO	6 (10), 2:50	May 5, 1983	Bristol, Tennessee, U.S.	
13	Win	13–0	Steve Johnson	KO	1 (12), 2:15	Mar 16, 1983	Castaways Hotel and Casino, Atlantic City, New Jersey, U.S.	Won ESPN junior middleweight title
12	Win	12–0	Dennis Horne	UD	10	Jan 20, 1983	Sands, Atlantic City, New Jersey, U.S.	
11	Win	11–0	Ricky Whitt	KO	4 (10), 2:48	Oct 17, 1982	The Claridge Hotel, Atlantic City, New Jersey, U.S.	
10	Win	10–0	Eddie Flanning	TKO	3 (10), 2:21	Sep 30, 1982	USS Yorktown (CV-10), Charleston, South Carolina, U.S.	
9	Win	9–0	Harold Brazier	MD	6	Sep 11, 1982	Sands, Atlantic City, New Jersey, U.S.	
8	Win	8–0	Mike Pollitt	KO	3 (6)	Aug 4, 1982	Sands, Atlantic City, New Jersey, U.S.	
7	Win	7–0	Roosevelt Moss	KO	1 (6), 1:59	Jul 17, 1982	Bally's Park Place, Atlantic City, New Jersey, U.S.	
6	Win	6–0	Jose Fuentes	TKO	3 (6)	Jun 23, 1982	Sands, Atlantic City, New Jersey, U.S.	
5	Win	5–0	Bruce Strauss	KO	3 (6)	May 20, 1982	Sands, Atlantic City, New Jersey, U.S.	
4	Win	4–0	Tony Taylor	UD	6	Mar 17, 1982	Sands, Atlantic City, New Jersey, U.S.	
3	Win	3–0	Keith Corbett	KO	6 (6)	Feb 4, 1982	Sands, Atlantic City, New Jersey, U.S.	
2	Win	2–0	Gary Baker	KO	2 (4)	Jan 19, 1982	Memphis, Tennessee, U.S.	
1	Win	1–0	Kevin Griffin	KO	3 (4), 2:48	Dec 2, 1981	Sands, Atlantic City, New Jersey, U.S.	
