= Luis Resto (boxer) =

Puerto Rican boxer

Personal information
- Nationality: American
- Born: June 11, 1955 (age 71) Juncos, Puerto Rico
- Height: 5 ft 7.5 in (171 cm)
- Weight: Welterweight; Light middleweight

Boxing career
- Reach: 68.5 in (174 cm)
- Stance: Orthodox

Boxing record
- Total fights: 31
- Wins: 20
- Win by KO: 8
- Losses: 8
- Draws: 2
- No contests: 1

Luis Resto (born June 11, 1955) is a Puerto Rican former boxer based in The Bronx, New York, who was convicted of assault and conspiracy for his part in a cheating scandal.

A journeyman boxer all his career, Resto was convicted in 1986 and jailed for two and a half years, for assault, criminal possession of a weapon and conspiracy. Both a state boxing commission investigation and a criminal investigation found that Resto's cornermen had illegally altered Resto's gloves by removing the padding and soaking his hand wraps in plaster in a 1983 boxing match against Billy Collins Jr.. In the ensuing fight, Collins suffered a torn iris and permanently blurred vision, ending his career. Collins later died in a car crash on March 6, 1984.

== Early life ==
Luis Resto was born in Juncos, Puerto Rico, and moved to the Bronx when he was nine years old. Late in his eighth grade year, he elbowed his math teacher in the face, and spent six months in a rehabilitation center for the mentally disturbed. Not long after getting out, an uncle signed him up for boxing lessons in a Bronx gym.

A two-time New York Golden Gloves amateur state champion in the welterweight division, Resto trained at the Police Athletic Leagues Lynch Center. He won both the 1975 and 1976 147 lb Golden Gloves Open Championships. Resto defeated Miguel Hernandez in the finals of the 1976 147 lb Open Championship.

== Professional career ==
=== Early career ===
Resto made his professional boxing debut on February 4, 1977, with a points defeat of Julio Chevalier. He scored his first professional knockout in his third professional fight, against Mike Lytell in May of the same year. Resto remained unbeaten with a 7–0 record until his eighth bout, a knockout loss to Bruce Curry in March 1978.

Through 29 fights Resto had compiled a record of 20–8–1, but with only eight wins by knockout, which made him appear to be a light-punching, high-level journeyman. Although he was ranked 10th in the world, he was practically unknown outside the New York area.

=== Bout with Billy Collins Jr. ===
On June 16, 1983, Resto unexpectedly beat undefeated prospect Billy Collins Jr. at Madison Square Garden in New York City in a 10-round unanimous decision. The fight was the undercard for a bout between Roberto Durán and Davey Moore.

However, when Collins's father and trainer, Billy Sr., came to shake Resto's hand, he discovered that Resto's gloves felt thinner than normal. Screaming that he thought the gloves had no padding, Collins Sr. demanded that the New York State Athletic Commission impound the gloves. An investigation revealed that the padding had been removed from each glove and Resto's hands were wrapped with plaster. Collins's eyes were swollen shut by the end of the 10th round, and the rest of his face was so badly swollen that it was impossible to believe a light puncher could have inflicted such damage.

Collins suffered a torn iris and permanently blurred vision, ending his career. He died only months later when he drove his car into a culvert while intoxicated. Some commentators have speculated that the loss of his livelihood drove him into a downward spiral. Collins' father has since speculated that his son's death was a suicide.

After a month's investigation, the New York State Boxing Commission determined that Resto's trainer, Panama Lewis, had removed the padding from Resto's gloves. It also determined that Resto should have known the gloves were illegal. The commission suspended Resto's boxing license for at least a year. Since most state boxing commissions honor sanctions from other states, this effectively banned Resto from boxing in the United States for the duration of the ban. The commission subsequently changed its rules to prevent anything like what happened to Collins from ever happening again. Resto's win was subsequently changed to a no contest.

In 1986, Lewis and Resto were both put on trial and found guilty of assault, criminal possession of a weapon (Resto's hands) and conspiracy. Prosecutors charged that Resto had to have known the gloves were illegal, and therefore the bout amounted to an illegal 10-round assault. Prosecutors also argued that the plot was centered on a large amount of money bet on Resto by a third party, who had met with Lewis prior to the fight. Resto served 2 1/2 years in prison.

After 15 years of trying to regain his license, he was finally allowed to work as a cornerman by New York State. For many years, he has lived in an apartment near the gym where he once trained, and has worked with youngsters there as well.

For almost a quarter-century, Resto publicly denied knowing that Lewis had tampered with the gloves. However, in 2007, Resto apologized to Collins's widow, Andrea Collins-Nile, who attempted to sue the state of New York for not protecting her late husband. Resto also told Collins-Nile that in addition to removing padding from the gloves, Lewis soaked his hand wraps in plaster of Paris. This caused the wraps to harden into plaster casts similar to those used to set broken bones, which greatly—and illegally—increased Resto's punching power. The hand wraps have never been confiscated. Resto also disclosed that Lewis would break apart pills used to treat asthma and pour the medicine into his water bottles, giving Resto greater lung capacity in the later rounds of a fight. Resto also visited Collins's gravesite and said, "I'm sorry for what I did to you." At a 2008 press conference, Resto said that he knew Lewis had taken the padding out of his gloves and had done so at least twice before. Resto said he did not protest at the time even though he knew it was wrong. "At the time, I was young," he said. "I went along." Resto was 28 years old at the time of the incident.

The 1983 incident and subsequent aftermath is covered in the Showtime documentary Assault in the Ring. During this documentary, Resto appeared to confirm law enforcement's theory that the incident was rooted in large bets on him.

== Professional boxing record ==
31 fights	20 wins	8 losses
By knockout	8	3
By decision	12	5
Draws	2	
No contests	1	

No.	Result	Record	Opponent	Type	Round, time	Date	Location	Notes
31	NC	20–8–2 (1)	Billy Collins Jr.	NC	10	June 16, 1983	Madison Square Garden, New York City, New York, U.S.	Originally a UD win for Resto, later ruled a NC after he used tampered gloves and handwraps
30	Win	20–8–2	Sammy Horne	UD	12	April 7, 1983	Sands Casino Hotel, Atlantic City, New Jersey, U.S.	
29	Win	19–8–2	Robert Sawyer	TKO	12 (12), 1:33	December 16, 1982	Sands Casino Hotel, Atlantic City, New Jersey, U.S.	
28	Loss	18–8–2	Kevin Perry	PTS	10	October 22, 1982	Felt Forum, New York, New York City, U.S.	
27	Win	18–7–2	Frank Medina	TKO	2 (10)	October 7, 1982	Felt Forum, New York, New York City, U.S.	
26	Win	17–7–2	Giovanni Bovenzi	UD	10	July 4, 1982	Riverfront Coliseum, Cincinnati, Ohio, U.S.	
25	Win	16–7–2	Domingo Ayala	TKO	7 (10)	September 16, 1981	Madison Square Garden, New York, New York City, U.S.	
24	Loss	15–7–2	Manuel Jiminez	PTS	10	June 20, 1981	Coliseo Roberto Clemente, San Juan, Puerto Rico	
23	Win	15–6–2	Jose Vallejo	PTS	10	March 5, 1981	Trujillo Alto, Puerto Rico, Puerto Rico	
22	Loss	14–6–2	Nino Gonzalez	KO	9 (10), 1:13	November 25, 1980	Madison Square Garden, New York, New York City, U.S.	
21	Win	14–5–2	Ismael Martinez	PTS	10	November 6, 1980	San Juan, Puerto Rico	
20	Win	13–5–2	Jorge Mojica	KO	8 (?)	October 9, 1980	San Juan, Puerto Rico, Puerto Rico	
19	Win	12–5–2	Juan Hidalgo	UD	10	June 6, 1980	Felt Forum, New York, New York City, U.S.	
18	Draw	11–5–2	Adolfo Viruet	SD	10	March 28, 1980	Felt Forum, New York, New York City, U.S.	
17	Win	11–5–1	Pat Hallacy	UD	10	October 26, 1979	Madison Square Garden, New York, New York City, U.S.	
16	Loss	10–5–1	Vernon Lewis	SD	10	August 18, 1979	National Sports Hall, Georgetown, Guyana	
15	Win	10–4–1	Earl Liburd	UD	8	April 6, 1979	Felt Forum, New York, New York City, U.S.	
14	Win	9–4–1	Gary Coats	TKO	4 (8)	March 16, 1979	Cincinnati Gardens, Cincinnati, Ohio, U.S.	
13	Win	8–4–1	Reggie Ford	PTS	10	February 18, 1979	Georgetown, Guyana	
12	Loss	7–4–1	John Baker Muwanga	PTS	8	February 15, 1979	Nordstrandhallen, Oslo, Norway	
11	Win	7–3–1	Mark Harris	KO	7 (10)	October 1, 1978	Georgetown, Guyana	
10	Loss	6–3–1	Luis Primera	KO	1 (10)	July 29, 1978	Nuevo Circo, Caracas, Venezuela	
9	Loss	6–2–1	Mario Guilloti	PTS	8	April 22, 1978	Teatro Ariston, Sanremo, Italy	
8	Loss	6–1–1	Bruce Curry	TKO	2 (10), 2:22	March 18, 1978	The Aladdin, Las Vegas, Nevada, U.S.	
7	Win	6–0–1	Fighting Hunks	UD	10	December 17, 1977	Lionel Roberts Stadium, Charlotte Amalie, U.S. Virgin Islands	
6	Win	5–0–1	Anthony Daniels	PTS	6	November 18, 1977	Madison Square Garden, New York City, New York, U.S.	
5	Draw	4–0–1	Sam Hailstock	PTS	6	June 18, 1977	Long Island Arena, Commack, New York, U.S.	
4	Win	4–0	Tyrone Phelps	KO	4 (6)	June 3, 1977	Sunnyside Gardens, Queens, New York, U.S.	
3	Win	3–0	Mike Lytell	KO	2 (?)	May 6, 1977	Sunnyside Gardens, Queens, New York, U.S.	
2	Win	2–0	Ronald Whyms	UD	6	April 19, 1977	Westchester County Center, White Plains, New York, U.S.	
1	Win	1–0	Julio Chevalier	PTS	4	February 4, 1977	Sunnyside Gardens, Queens, New York, U.S.	
