= Preamble to Bramble =

- Date: September 26, 1986
- Venue: Abel Holtz Stadium, Miami Beach, Florida, U.S.

The Preamble to Bramble, also known as the Liteweight World Series, was a professional boxing card contested at Abel Holtz Stadium in Miami Beach, Florida on September 26, 1986.

Promoted by Don King and broadcast by HBO, the card was co-headlined by two lightweight world title fights; champion Livingstone Bramble vs. challenger Edwin Rosario for the WBA lightweight title, and champion Héctor Camacho vs. challenger Cornelius Boza-Edwards for the WBC lightweight tile.

== Background ==
Immediately following his victory over his mandatory challenger Tyrone Crawley, Livingstone Bramble, the WBA lightweight champion, called out reigning WBC lightweight titlist Héctor Camacho, declaring "I want Camacho" when asked who he would next like to face. Camacho, who was scheduled to defend his title against Edwin Rosario in June, reciprocated Bramble's comments and Camacho's promoter Don King revealed that he had spoke to Bramble about a future fight between him and Camacho sometime in the near future.

One month after Camacho's victory over Rosario, King announced the framework for a doubleheader event set for late September that would see Camacho and Bramble defend their title against Cornelius Boza-Edwards and Rosario, respectively. Original plans called for Camacho and Bramble to first co-headline an event in New York City's Madison Square Garden on August 21, facing Harold Brazier and Angel Cruz in what would both be non-title, tune-up bouts, but those plans were cancelled. King had hoped to stage the event at the 75,500+-seat Miami Orange Bowl, and the venue was initially announced as the host in late July when the plans were first announced, but at the event's official announcement one month later, the venue was changed to the less-than 10,000-seat Abel Holtz Stadium in Miami Beach. King promoted the event as the Preamble to Bramble, as Camacho and Bramble were then tentatively scheduled to face each other the following March.

Bramble was a 3–1 favorite over Rosario, while Camacho was a 5–1 favorite over Boza-Edwards.

== Bramble vs. Rosario ==
Preamble to Bramble: Bramble vs. Rosario
- Title(s) on the line: WBA lightweight title

Tale of the tape
Boxer	Livingstone Bramble	Edwin Rosario
Nickname	Pitbull	Chapo ("Shorty")
Hometown	Saint Croix, U.S. Virgin Islands	Toa Baja, Puerto Rico
Pre-fight record	24–1–1 (15 KO)	23–2 (19 KO)
Age	26 years	23 years, 6 months
Height	5 ft 8 in (173 cm)	5 ft 6 in (168 cm)
Weight	135 lb (61 kg)	135 lb (61 kg)
Style	Orthodox	Orthodox
Recognition	WBA; Lightweight Champion	former WBC lightweight champion

Result
- Rosario wins via 2nd-round knockout

=== Fight details ===
Bramble and Rosario fought a cautious, even first round, with neither fighter landing anything substantial. The lack of action was reflected in the official scorecard with two of the three judges scoring the fight even at 10–10. However, just past the one-minute mark in the second round, Rosario back Bramble into the ropes and stunned Bramble with a left uppercut which forced a hurt Bramble to clinch. After the clinch was broken, Rosario would again back Bramble against the ropes, buckling Brambles legs with left hook in the corner. A dazed Bramble would briefly clinch Rosario and tried to go on the defensive, but the aggressive Rosario continued to land big punches as Bramble did little but cover up. As Bramble retreated from the ropes to the center of the ring, Rosario sent him down with a big right hook with less than 50 seconds left in the round. Bramble, clearly hurt and now bleeding from his right eye, remained on his hands and knees and did not attempt to get back to his feet until after referee Ernesto Magana had reached 10. Rosario had secured the knockout victory at 2:28 of the round.

=== Aftermath ===
Having spoiled the planned Bramble–Camacho fight, Rosario stated after the fight "Everybody forgot about me. I'm sorry I spoiled everybody's plans. I knew I'd knock out Bramble. Camacho's style is hard for me, but Bramble is tailor-made." Bramble explained that he did attempt to get up after the knockdown because he "couldn't see."

== Camacho vs. Boza-Edwards ==
Preamble to Bramble: Camacho vs. Boza-Edwards
- Title(s) on the line: WBC lightweight title

Tale of the tape
Boxer	Héctor Camacho	Cornelius Boza-Edwards
Nickname	Macho	
Hometown	Bayamón, Puerto Rico	Kampala, Uganda
Pre-fight record	29–0 (15 KO)	44–5–1 (34 KO)
Age	24 years, 4 months	30 years, 3 months
Height	5 ft 7 in (170 cm)	5 ft 8 1/2 in (174 cm)
Weight	135 lb (61 kg)	135 lb (61 kg)
Style	Southpaw	Southpaw
Recognition	WBA; Lightweight Champion	WBC; No. 2 Ranked Lightweight

Result
- Camacho wins via 12-round unanimous decision

=== Fight details ===
Just under a minute into the first round, Camacho scored what would be the lone knockdown of the fight, scoring with a left hook that sent an off-balance Boza-Edwards down on the seat of his pants, though he was up after taking an eight-count from referee Carlos Padilla Jr. After the knockdown, Camacho fought cautiously, frequently peppering Boza-Edwards with jabs and short combinations while keeping his distance and clinching whenever Boza-Edwards got in close, winning most of the judge's scorecards as Boza-Edwards struggled to catch the constantly retreating Camacho and land any substantial offense through 12 rounds. Camacho would earn the victory via a lopsided unanimous decision, winning by scores of 120–108 (12 rounds to zero), 118–109 (10 rounds to two) and 115–112 (seven rounds to five).

=== Aftermath ===
Boza-Edwards was heavily critical of Camacho's defensive-minded strategy and unwillingness to engage, stating bluntly "draw your own conclusions, but I don't call that fighting." Boza-Edwards' trainer Mickey Duff was also critical, but of referee Carlos Padilla Jr.'s performance, complaining to the media after the fight "if (Padilla) had taken a point away, it would have forced Camacho to fight."

The fight with Boza-Edwards would prove to be Camacho's final one as a lightweight as he claimed he could no longer make the lightweight limit of 135 pounds. Camacho made his intentions to move up to light/junior welterweight division immediately after the fight, stating "No question, I'll be moving up to junior welterweight. I can't make the weight limit any more. In the later rounds I couldn't push it."

== Fight card ==
Confirmed bouts:

Weight Class	Weight		vs.		Method	Round	Notes
Lightweight	135 lbs.	Héctor Camacho (c)	def.	Cornelius Boza-Edwards	UD	12	^{note 1}
Lightweight	135 lbs.	Edwin Rosario	def.	Livingstone Bramble (c)	KO	2/15	^{note 2}
Heavyweight	200+ lbs.	José Ribalta	def.	John Williams	TKO	2/10
Lightweight	135 lbs.	Juan Nazario	def.	Jose Mosqueda	TKO	4/10
Welterweight	147 lbs.	Mauricio Rodriguez	def.	Martin Rojas	PTS	8
Heavyweight	200+ lbs.	Luis Alberto Gonzalez	def.	Jeff Freeney	DQ	1/6

^Note 2 For WBC Lightweight Title
^Note 2 For WBA Lightweight Title

== Broadcasting ==
Country	Broadcaster
United States	HBO

Preceded by vs. Tyrone Crawley	Livingstone Bramble's bouts September 26, 1986	Succeeded by vs. Freddie Pendleton
Preceded by vs. Héctor Camacho	Edwin Rosario's bouts September 26, 1986	Succeeded by vs. Roger Brown
Preceded by vs. Freddie Roach	Héctor Camacho's bouts September 26, 1986	Succeeded by vs. Howard Davis Jr.
Preceded by vs. Terrence Alli	Cornelius Boza-Edwards' bouts September 26, 1986	Succeeded by vs. Ali Kareem Muhammad
