= Ray Mancini vs. Héctor Camacho =

Boxing match

Grudge Match '89
- Date: March 6, 1989
- Venue: Lawlor Events Center, Reno, Nevada, U.S.
- Title(s) on the line: Inaugural WBO light welterweight title

Tale of the tape
Boxer	Ray Mancini	Héctor Camacho
Nickname	Boom Boom	Macho
Hometown	Youngstown, Ohio, U.S.	Bayamón, Puerto Rico
Purse	$1,200,000	$650,000
Pre-fight record	29–3 (23 KO)	33–0 (17 KO)
Age	28 years	26 years, 9 months
Height	5 ft 4 1/2 in (164 cm)	5 ft 7 in (170 cm)
Weight	139 lb (63 kg)	140 lb (64 kg)
Style	Orthodox	Southpaw
Recognition	Former WBA; Lightweight Champion	2-division world champion

Result
- Camacho wins via 12-round split decision (115–113, 115–113, 112–116)

Ray Mancini vs. Héctor Camacho, billed as Grudge Match '89, was a professional boxing match contested on March 6, 1989, for the inaugural WBO light welterweight title.

== Background ==
In November 1988, a fight between Ray Mancini and Héctor Camacho was announced to take place the following March. The 28-year old Mancini was coming back after having not fought since losing a WBA lightweight title match to Livingstone Bramble in February 1985, after which he entered a four-year retirement. For Camacho, it would be his first major fight since being stripped of the WBC title in early 1987. The upstart World Boxing Organization would sanction the fight with their inaugural light welterweight title being on the line.

Negotiations for the fight, which was being promoted by former heavyweight contender Gerry Cooney and his manager Dennis Rapaport, had taken place throughout 1988 but had been plagued by setbacks. The fight looked to be in jeopardy in early February when Camacho was arrested in Clewiston, Florida after pulling out a gun and threatening two high school students he had mistakenly believed insulted him and being found to be in possession of cocaine. However, just days later, after Camacho had been released on bond, both fighters had agreed to financial terms with the bout being set for May 1988. The following month, the fight was called off when Caesars Palace, the host venue, failed to secure an insurance policy that would have covered losses if one of the fighters pulled out of the fight. With the fight indefinitely postponed, Camacho, who had originally reached an agreement with Mancini to not have a tune-up fight prior to their bout, looked to schedule a fight with another opponent as he had been inactive for a year. Camacho would face Reyes Cruz on June 25, surviving a first-round knockdown en route to a unanimous decision victory, and then defeat Rick Souce in his native Puerto Rico on October 22 before the Mancini fight was made official.

The lead up to the fight featured intense trash talk from both fighters. Mancini claimed he had turned down offers to face then-light welterweight champions Roger Mayweather and Juan Martín Coggi, and lightweight champion Greg Haugen, as the fights didn't "turn him on" as he was only interested in facing Camacho. Mancini bashed Camacho in the press claiming Camacho was "bad for boxing", a "poor role model" and had "disgraced" his adopted hometown of Spanish Harlem. Camacho, meanwhile, dismissed Mancini as a "failure and loser", claimed he was only fighting for a payday and stated that he wasn't "worrying" about Mancini as he would not be "sharp enough" to stay with him due to his long layoff.

George Foreman was originally scheduled to appear on the undercard, but pulled out of the event when he and the Nevada State Athletic Commission could not agree on an opponent. Instead, Olympic silver medalist and future undisputed heavyweight champion Riddick Bowe made his professional debut, knocking out Lionel Butler in round two of a four-round bout.

== Fight Details ==
In a largely uneventful fight, Camacho secured a split decision victory, with two judges scoring the fight in his favor with identical scores of 115–113, while the third scored in favor of Mancini 116–112.

Mancini pressed forward for the entire fight as Camacho mostly avoided exchanging punches, rather mostly peppering Mancini with jabs and backpedaling away, and clinching Mancini whenever he got in close in a successful attempt to slow Mancini down, though also landing flurries throughout and ultimately doing just enough to secure a narrow victory.

== Aftermath ==
Mancini disagreed with the result stating "No doubt in my mind I won the fight. It wasn’t pretty by any means, but I did keep throwing punches." Camacho, who was loudly booed by the pro-Mancini crowd for his retreating tactics, claimed "It was the smartest fight with the kind of slugger who's trying to take control."

== Fight card ==
Confirmed bouts:

Weight Class	Weight		vs.		Method	Round	Notes
Light welterweight	140 lbs.	Héctor Camacho	def.	Ray Mancini	SD	12	^{note 1}
Featherweight	126 lbs.	Lupe Gutierrez	def.	Jeff Franklin	SD	12	^{note 2}
Light Welterweight	140 lbs.	Kenneth Comer	def.	Jesse Lopez	TKO	2/10
Lightweight	135 lbs.	Roland Commings	def.	Mario Fuentes	TKO	8/8
Heavyweight	200+ lbs.	Riddick Bowe	def.	Lionel Butler	TKO	2/4
Middleweight	160 lbs.	Carlos Cruzat	def.	John Tunstall	TKO	2/4
Super Bantamweight	122 lbs.	Felix Camacho	def.	Chilo Guzman	UD	4/4

^Note 1 For Inaugural WBO Light Welterweight Title
^Note 2 For Vacant IBF-USBA Featherweight Title

== Broadcasting ==
Country	Broadcaster
United States	Warner Bros. Pay-Per-View

Preceded by vs. Livingstone Bramble II	Ray Mancini's bouts 6 March 1989	Succeeded by vs. Greg Haugen
Preceded by vs. Rick Souce	Héctor Camacho's bouts 6 March 1989	Succeeded by vs. Tommy Hanks
