= Livingstone Bramble vs. Ray Mancini II =

Boxing match

The Reno Rematch
- Date: February 16, 1985
- Venue: Lawlor Events Center, Reno, Nevada, U.S.
- Title(s) on the line: WBA Lightweight title

Tale of the tape
Boxer	Livingstone Bramble	Ray Mancini
Nickname	Pitbull	Boom Boom
Hometown	Saint Croix, U.S. Virgin Islands	Youngstown, Ohio, U.S.
Purse	$750,000	$550,000
Pre-fight record	22–1–1 (14 KO)	29–2 (23 KO)
Age	24 years, 5 months	23 years, 11 months
Height	5 ft 8 in (173 cm)	5 ft 4 1/2 in (164 cm)
Weight	134 lb (61 kg)	135 lb (61 kg)
Style	Orthodox	Orthodox
Recognition	WBA; Lightweight Champion; The Ring; No. 1 Ranked Lightweight	WBA; No. 2 Ranked Lightweight; The Ring; No. 6 Ranked Lightweight; Former Lightweight Champion

Result
- Bramble wins via 15-round unanimous decision (144–143, 143–142, 143–142)

Livingstone Bramble vs. Ray Mancini II, billed as The Reno Rematch, was a professional boxing match contested on February 16, 1985, for the WBA lightweight title.

== Background ==
On June 1, 1985, 4–1 underdog Livingstone Bramble, trailing on two of three scorecards, scored a 14th-round technical knockout victory over the heavily favored Ray Mancini to capture the WBA lightweight title. Days later, Mancini told the press that he would pursue an immediate rematch with Bramble, claiming the loss had given him his "hunger" back, while also stating that the loss had been the result of "overtraining" which had left him sluggish and without his normal punching power. To ensure his less-than-stellar performance wasn't medically related, Mancini underwent, and passed, a series of physical tests which cleared him to resume his boxing career.

In August 1984, it was announced by New Orleans-based promoter Barry Mendelson, that Mancini's next fight would be on September 8 against lightweight title contender Kenny "Bang Bang" Bogner in a 5,500-seat amphitheater on the grounds of the 1984 Louisiana World Exposition. However, while training for the bout, which was expected to be no more than a tune-up fight leading to a Bramble rematch, Mancini reopened a cut above his left eye that he had originally suffered in his fight with Bramble. Though Mancini initially said he was "not worried at all" about the wound effecting his scheduled fight against Bogner, Mancini pulled out of the fight the following day citing orders from his doctor, who advised Mancini against fighting after examing the cut and determining that there was no way to keep the wound from opening up should he go through with the fight. A Louisiana court served Mancini a court order mandating that he appear at a medical examination in New Orleans to verify if the wound was serious enough to warrant the fight's cancelation, but Mancini defied the order and no-showed the examination. This would result in both Mancini and his manager Dave Wolf receiving 60-day suspensions from the Louisiana Boxing Commission for not disclosing the injury to them when it had first happened two weeks prior to Mancini first revealing it.

Shortly after Mancini's suspension, it was announced that Bramble would make the first title defense against former contender Rodolfo González. However, the Bramble–González fight was cancelled and Bramble instead was matched up against Edwin Curet in a 10-round non-title fight on October 24, with Bramble winning by unanimous decision. Following, Bramble's victory over Curet, negotiations began for a Bramble–Mancini rematch and it was announced in late December that the bout would take place February 16, 1985, in Reno, Nevada. As Mancini was not the number-one lightweight as ranked by the WBA, the promoters had to pay Tyrone Crawley, who was ranked number-one, $150,000 to step aside. Crawley also signed a contract that guaranteed him a title fight with the winner.

Though Mancini entered their previous encounter as a heavy 4–1 favorite, he was installed as 14–5 underdog for this fight.

== Fight Details ==
The fight went the full 15-round distance with Bramble being named the winner by unanimous decision, being named the winner on all three judge's scorecards by the razor-thin margin of one point with two scores of 143–142 and one score of 144–143.

Mancini was mostly the aggressor and pressed the action by coming forward, but Bramble, using his height and reach advantage, frequently countered Mancini's punches and landed combinations to Mancini's head throughout the fight. As in their first fight, Bramble opened up a cut above Mancini's left eye which bled and caused vision problems for remainder of the bout. In the fifth, Bramble caused Mancini further trouble, landing an uppercut that opened a gash about Mancini's right eye, and by the seventh, Mancini's left eyed had been swollen almost completely shut, causing referee Mills Lane twice to halt the fight, once each in eighth round and 15th round, and call upon the ringside physician to observe Mancini's wounded face, though Mancini was cleared to continue each time. Despite only winning the fight by one point on the scorecards, Bramble dominated the punch stats, landing 671 punches to Mancini's 381.

== Fight card ==
Confirmed bouts:

Weight Class	Weight		vs.		Method	Round	Notes
Lightweight	135 lbs.	Livingstone Bramble (c)	def.	Ray Mancini	UD	15	^{note 1}
Light Middleweight	154 lbs.	Donnie Poole	def.	Leonardo Bermudez	KO	2/10
Featherweight	126 lbs.	Louie Espinoza	def.	Juan Romero	TKO	5/8
Super Featherweight	130 lbs.	Loris Stecca	def.	Tony Cisneros	TKO	3/8
Light Heavyweight	175 lbs.	Virgil Hill	def.	David Vedder	UD	6
Super Featherweight	130 lbs.	Maurizio Stecca	def.	Enrique Castillo	UD	6
Welterweight	147 lbs.	Vince Dunfee	def.	Jerry Lewis	TKO	5/6

^Note 1 For WBA Lightweight Title

== Broadcasting ==
Country	Broadcaster
United Kingdom	ITV
United States	HBO

Preceded by vs. Edwin Curet	Livingstone Bramble's bouts 16 February 1985	Succeeded by vs. Tyrone Crawley
Preceded by First bout	Ray Mancini's bouts 16 February 1985	Succeeded by vs. Héctor Camacho
