= Ray Mancini vs. Livingstone Bramble =

Boxing match

- Date: June 1, 1984
- Venue: Buffalo Memorial Auditorium, Buffalo, New York, U.S.
- Title(s) on the line: WBA Lightweight title

Tale of the tape
Boxer	Ray Mancini	Livingstone Bramble
Nickname	Boom Boom	Pitbull
Hometown	Youngstown, Ohio, U.S.	Saint Croix, U.S. Virgin Islands
Purse	$1,000,000	$150,000
Pre-fight record	29–1 (23 KO)	20–1–1 (13 KO)
Age	23 years, 2 months	23 years, 8 months
Height	5 ft 4 1/2 in (164 cm)	5 ft 8 in (173 cm)
Weight	135 lb (61 kg)	134 1/2 lb (61 kg)
Style	Orthodox	Orthodox
Recognition	WBA; Lightweight Champion; The Ring; No. 1 Ranked Lightweight	WBA; No. 1 Ranked Lightweight; The Ring; No. 4 Ranked Lightweight

Result
- Bramble wins via 14th-round technical knockout

Ray Mancini vs. Livingstone Bramble was a professional boxing match contested on June 1, 1984, for the WBA lightweight title.

== Background ==
On January 14, 1984, Ray Mancini had arguably his best performance, defeating 2-division champion Bobby Chacon via third-round technical knockout. One week later, Livingstone Bramble scored a unanimous decision victory over Rafael Williams, becoming the WBA's number-one ranked lightweight contender and Mancini's mandatory challenger. Immediately following Bramble's win, the WBA mandated that Mancini make his next title defense against Bramble by July 15 that year. In early April, the Mancini–Bramble fight was made official for June 1 in Buffalo, New York.

Bramble would stir up controversy several times during the weeks preceding the fight. Bramble and Mancini would exchange words and got into a brief scuffle after arriving in Buffalo to do press shortly after the fight's announcement when Bramble used profanity in the presence of children and then insulted Mancini's family when Mancini objected. Later, Mancini's manager Dave Wolf made accusations that Bramble had made derogatory remarks about white people and Italians and had also stated that Mancini was a "murderer" in reference to his fight with Kim Duk-koo, who had died from injuries sustained in the bout shortly after its conclusion two years prior. However, Bramble's manager Lou Duva, who like Mancini was of Italian descent, dismissed Wolf's claims, stating that Bramble was a "gentleman" and that he did not know "what the hell" Wolf was talking about. Bramble's constant trash talk so angered Mancini and Wolf that Wolf refused to let Mancini attend press conferences with Bramble and requested that the weigh-in be held separately. Bramble, in a publicity stunt, would employ a "witch doctor" from his native Virgin Islands to place a spell on Mancini prior to the bout.

Mancini, a heavy 4–1 favorite, was not expected to have much trouble with Bramble and reportedly had several proposed big money fights lined up after his expected victory over Bramble, with Wilfredo Gómez, Héctor Camacho and Aaron Pryor, the latter two of whom were in attendance of the Mancini–Bramble fight, all emerging as possible opponents. However, Mancini insisted that he was not taking Bramble lightly, stating "I'm not even thinking about those guys. Bramble is the one guy on my mind right now. I'm not looking past him." Negotiations for the planned Mancini–Pryor bout was reported to be in the beginning stages with a group of Toronto-based businessmen and promoter Don Elbaum having already put in a $5 million bid to host the fight in Toronto.

== Bumphus vs. Hatcher ==
Johnny Bumphus vs. Gene Hatcher
- Title(s) on the line: WBA light welterweight title

Tale of the tape
Boxer	Johnny Bumphus	Gene Hatcher
Nickname	Bump City	Mad Dog
Hometown	Tacoma, Washington, U.S.	Fort Worth, Texas, U.S.
Purse	$175,000	$75,000
Pre-fight record	22–0 (16 KO)	21–2 (17 KO)
Age	22 years, 9 months	24 years, 11 months
Height	6 ft 10 in (208 cm)	5 ft 8 in (173 cm)
Weight	139 1/2 lb (63 kg)	139 1/2 lb (63 kg)
Style	Southpaw	Orthodox
Recognition	WBA; Light Welterweight Champion; The Ring; No. 1 Ranked Light Welterweight	WBA; No. 4 Ranked Light Welterweight; The Ring; No. 12 Ranked Light Welterweight

Result
- Hatcher wins via 11th-round technical knockout

The main undercard bout saw undefeated WBA light welterweight champion Johnny Bumphus, who had won the vacant title in his previous fight against Lorenzo Garcia after Aaron Pryor briefly retired and vacated the title, making his first title defense against Gene Hatcher, then ranked the WBA's number-seven ranked light welterweight contender. Though Hatcher had been upgraded to the number-four contender by the time of the fight, Bumphus, like Mancini, was a heavy 4–1 favorite going into the fight and was expected to defeat Hatcher with relative ease before likely moving up to the welterweight division due to trouble making the light welterweight limit of 140 pounds.

=== Fight Details ===
Going into the 11th round, Bumphus was in clear control of the fight and was ahead on all three of the judge's scorecards by comfortable margins. However, with around a minute remaining in the round, Hatcher landed a left hook that sent Bumphus down to the canvas. Bumphus was hurt by the blow but was able to answer referee Johnny LoBianco's 10-count, though he was on wobbly legs as Hatcher moved in and swung wildly, causing him to slip to the canvas and throw Bumphus down as he attempted to clinch. After both fighters were separated by LoBianco, the fight continued with Hatcher getting Bumphus against the ropes and landing a combination to Bumphus' head as LoBianco stepped in and stopped the fight.

=== Aftermath ===
After the stoppage, Bumphus, in a rage, attacked Hatcher as he celebrated with his team and had to be restrained by local police. Bumphus' manager and trainer Lou Duva, meanwhile, would charge LoBianco and had to restrained by his son Dan and others to prevent further chaos.

Bumphus later apologized for his actions but maintained the fight should not have been stopped. While Bumphus avoided punishment for his role in the post-fight melee, Lou Duva was fined $2,500 and given one year of probation by the New York State Athletic Commission.

The fight was named the 1984 recipient of The Ring magazine's Upset of the Year.

Preceded by vs. Lorenzo Garcia	Johnny Bumphus's bouts 1 June 1984	Succeeded by vs. Ralph Twinning
Preceded by vs. Hector Sifuentes	Gene Hatcher's bouts 1 June 1984	Succeeded by vs. Ubaldo Néstor Sacco
Awards
Preceded by Michael Dokes vs. Gerrie Coetzee	The Ring Upset of the Year; 1984	Succeeded by Larry Holmes vs. Michael Spinks

== Fight Details ==
In a what was a tough, closely contested fight, Bramble would score an upset victory by technical knockout in the 14th round.

In the first round, an accidental clash of heads opened up a large cut above Mancini's right eye, which bled throughout the fight and was the first of several wounds that Bramble inflicted on Mancini. Mancini was the busier puncher early on, but Bramble blocked and countered many of Mancini's punches and from round three on, switched back and forth from his natural orthodox stance to southpaw which effectively hindered Mancini. Bramble would start to gain control in the fight in the middle rounds, as he started to batter a tiring Mancini, opening up a cut on Mancini's nose in the sixth and another cut, this time above Mancini's left eye, in the ninth and by the tenth, both of Mancini's eyes began to swell after absorbing several rounds of punishment.

Mancini tried to make a comeback in the 11th as Bramble took a less aggressive approach which led to Mancini to take some of the later rounds on the scorecards. Going into the 14th round, Mancini held a narrow lead on two of the scorecards with scores of 125–122 and 124–123, while Bramble was winning the third with a score of 126–121. In that 14th round, Bramble would make a big play to finally put Mancini away, attacking with and landing several big punches as Mancini tried and failed to back peddle away and clinch Bramble. A straight left from Bramble drove Mancini into the ropes and Bramble followed with an unanswered barrage, landing numerous power punches on a practically defenseless Mancini in the corner, before referee Marty Denkin stepped in and stopped the fight at the 53 second mark.

== Fight card ==
Confirmed bouts:

Weight Class	Weight		vs.		Method	Round	Notes
Lightweight	135 lbs.	Livingstone Bramble	def.	Ray Mancini (c)	TKO	14/15	^{note 1}
Light Welterweight	140 lbs.	Gene Hatcher	def.	Johnny Bumphus (c)	TKO	11/15	^{note 2}
Lightweight	135 lbs.	Charlie Brown	def.	Remo Di Carlo	PTS	10
Light Welterweight	140 lbs.	Ken Willis	def.	Jim Giambelluca	KO	3/4
Cruiserweight	190 lbs.	Jim Jones	def.	Tony Campbell	PTS	4

^Note 1 For WBA Lightweight Title
^Note 2 For WBA Light Welterweight Title

== Broadcasting ==
Country	Broadcaster
United Kingdom	ITV
United States	Syndication

Preceded by vs. Bobby Chacon	Ray Mancini's bouts 1 June 1984	Succeeded by Rematch
Preceded by vs. Rafael Williams	Livingstone Bramble's bouts 1 June 1984	Succeeded by vs. Edwin Curet
