= Livingstone Bramble vs. Tyrone Crawley =

1986 professional boxing match

The Grand Slam
- Date: February 16, 1986
- Venue: MGM Grand Reno, Reno, Nevada, U.S.
- Title on the line: WBA lightweight title

Tale of the tape
Boxer	Livingstone Bramble	Tyrone Crawley
Nickname	Pitbull	The Butterfly
Hometown	Saint Croix, U.S. Virgin Islands	Philadelphia, Pennsylvania, U.S.
Purse	$214,000	$71,000
Pre-fight record	23–1–1 (14 KO)	19–1 (6 KO)
Age	25 years, 5 months	27 years, 3 months
Height	5 ft 8 in (173 cm)	5 ft 8 in (173 cm)
Weight	135 lb (61 kg)	134 3/4 lb (61 kg)
Style	Orthodox	Orthodox
Recognition	WBA; Lightweight Champion; The Ring; No. 1 Ranked Lightweight	WBA; No. 1 Ranked Lightweight; The Ring; No. 4 Ranked Lightweight

Result
- Bramble wins via 13th-round technical knockout

Livingstone Bramble vs. Tyrone Crawley, billed as The Grand Slam, was a professional boxing match contested on February 16, 1986, for the WBA lightweight title.

== Background ==
After Livingstone Bramble upset Ray Mancini to claim the WBA lightweight title in June 1984, the two fighters pursued an rematch set for February 1985. However, as Tyrone Crawley was now ranked the WBA's number-one lightweight and thus Bramble's mandatory challenger, the promoters of the bout had to pay Crawley $150,000 to step aside and allow the rematch to continue forward. Both Bramble and Mancini signed contracts stating they would next fight Crawley should they win. Crawley, meanwhile defeated Nick Parker on January 31, 1985, in what was supposed to be a tune-up before challenging the winner for the lightweight title. Afterwards, Crawley stated that he expected his title fight to take place later that summer in either June or July.

Two weeks after Crawley's victory over Parker, Bramble would once again defeat Mancini to retain his title and supposedly set up a fight with Crawley Shortly after his victory over Mancini, Bramble was found to have the banned stimulant ephedrine, briefly putting his title reign, and thus his fight with Crawley, in jeopardy, though the Nevada State Athletic Commission decided against suspending him and only issued a fine to him and his manager Lou Duva.

The Bramble–Crawley fight was officially announced in early April to take place on May 26, but the fight was plagued with delays and postponements. One month later, the fight was postponed for the first time when Bramble suffered a fractured left hand while training. The fight was then rescheduled for October 12, but was postponed again for various reasons which included; NBC reneging on their offer to broadcast the fight, Bramble's preferred trainer Panama Lewis being unable to get a license in Nevada and promoter Dan Duva claiming that Crawley had not agreed to the contractual terms. With NBC recommitting to broadcasting the fight and contractual issues fixed, the fight was rescheduled for November 23, but was postponed for a third time when Crawley pulled out just days before citing a hand injury he had suffered two weeks prior while sparring. After the third postponement, the fight was finally set for February 16, 1986, one year to the day of Brambles previous fight.

After the second postponement, Bramble parted ways with his manager Lou Duva after Duva's managerial contract expired. Duva promptly sued Bramble claiming he was owed money from this and past fights. Lou's son Dan, offered Bramble the opportunity to buy him out of his promotional contract with Bramble, but was retained for the fight with Crawley.

== Fight Details ==
Bramble pressed the action, repeatedly attacked Crawley's body and was able to avoid any real trouble en route and had built up a comfortable lead on the judge's scorecards heading into the final rounds.

Bramble scored an early flash knockdown, sending Crawley down less than one minute into the second round after catching him with a right hand that sent Crawley off-balance and down on his knees, though he was quickly back up. Just after the bell at end of the sixth round, Bramble landed a punch, for which referee Joey Curtis deducted a point. The point deduction briefly opened a window for Crawley to get back in the fight as he won some of following rounds, though Bramble regained control and didn't lose a round on any of the scorecards after the eighth. The fight came to an end when with around 30 seconds left in the 13th round, Bramble connected with a right that sent a dazed Crawley staggering back into the corner, after which Bramble landed a barrage of punches that sent Crawley through the ropes and then down on the canvas. Crawley was able to answer Curtis' 10-count but was clearly hurt and on wobbly legs but Curtis nevertheless allowed him continue the fight. Bramble quickly moved in and quickly sent Crawley down with a combination causing Curtis to the stop the fight.

== Aftermath ==
Promoter Bob Arum was openly critical of referee Joey Curtis' decision to allow Crawley to continue fighting after the first knockdown in the 13th round, calling it "inexcusable" and "insane." Duane Ford, the then-vice president of the Nevada State Athletic Commission himself was very critical of judges Hector Hernandez Vilchis and Harmodio Cedeno for scoring many of the rounds even. Ford called their judging "pathetic."

== Fight card ==
Confirmed bouts:

Weight Class	Weight		vs.		Method	Round	Notes
Lightweight	135 lbs.	Livingstone Bramble	def.	Tyrone Crawley	TKO	13/15	^{note 1}
Lightweight	135 lbs.	Greg Haugen	def.	Juan Carlos Alvarado	TKO	9/10
Light Heavyweight	175 lbs.	Shaun Ayers	def.	Ruben Williams	TKO	1/6
Light Welterweight	140 lbs.	John Edwards	def.	Clifton Charleswell	KO	4/4

^Note 1 For WBA Lightweight Title

== Broadcasting ==
Country	Broadcaster
United States	NBC

Preceded by vs. Ray Mancini II	Livingstone Bramble's bouts February 16, 1986	Succeeded by vs. Edwin Rosario
Preceded by vs. Charlie Brown	Tyrone Crawley's bouts February 16, 1986	Succeeded by vs. Ali Kareem Muhammad
