= Johnny Bumphus =

American boxer (1960–2020)

Personal information
- Nickname: Bump City
- Nationality: American
- Born: August 17, 1960 Tacoma, Washington, U.S.
- Died: January 31, 2020 (aged 59) Tacoma, Washington, U.S.
- Height: 6 ft 0 in (183 cm)
- Weight: Light welterweight; Welterweight

Boxing career
- Reach: 74 in (188 cm)
- Stance: Southpaw

Boxing record
- Total fights: 31
- Wins: 29
- Win by KO: 20
- Losses: 2

Johnny 'Bump City' Bumphus (August 17, 1960 – January 31, 2020) was an American professional boxer who held the WBA super lightweight title in 1984 and challenged once for the WBC and IBF welterweight titles in 1987.

== Amateur career ==
Bumphus began boxing as an amateur at the age of eight at the Tacoma Boy's Club Boxing Club, located on 25th and Yakima Avenue. He was one of four World Champions to begin boxing in Tacoma, the others being Freddie Steele, Rocky Lockridge and Leo Randolph.

His amateur highlights were:

- Winning the 1977 National AAU Featherweight Championship by decisioning Lee Simmons of Akron, Ohio, in the final.
- Winning the 1979 National Golden Gloves Championship in the lightweight division (132 lbs) by defeating Efrain Nieves at Indianapolis.
- Being ranked #1 U.S. Lightweight by the U.S. Amateur Boxers and Coaches Association in 1979, while also serving as a deputy sheriff with the Nashville Sheriff's Department in Nashville, Tennessee.

Bumphus qualified for the 1980 American Olympic boxing team, but did not compete due to the American boycott of the Moscow Olympics. He was the torch bearer for the American Olympians.

In August 1980, he signed with boxing promoter Bob Arum reportedly for $500,000.

=== Highlights ===
National Golden Gloves (125 lbs), Honolulu, Hawaii, March–April 1977:

- 1/2: Defeated Larry Tatman by decision
- Finals: Lost to Bernard Taylor by decision

(gold) United States National Championships (125 lbs), Winston-Salem, North Carolina, May 1977:

- 1/2: Defeated Jerry Smith by decision
- Finals: Defeated Leo Simmons by decision

USA–Poland Duals (125 lbs), Las Vegas, Nevada, August 1977:

- Lost to Roman Gotfryd (Poland) by unanimous decision, 0–3

USA–Romania Duals (125 lbs), Caesars Tahoe, Stateline, Nevada, January 1978:

- Defeated Gheorghe Ciochina (Romania) by decision

USA–Yugoslavia Duals (132 lbs), Memphis, Tennessee, February 1978:

- Defeated Ace Rusevski (Yugoslavia) by decision

United States National Championships (132 lbs), Biloxi, Mississippi, April 1978:

- 1/8: Defeated Mike Hess by decision
- 1/4: Lost to Davey Armstrong by decision

USA–USSR Duals (132 lbs), Las Vegas, Nevada, January 1979:

- Defeated Dmitriy Grubov (Soviet Union) by decision

Cuba–USA Duals (132 lbs), Havana, Cuba, February 1979:

- Defeated Adolfo Horta (Cuba) by decision

(gold) Southern Golden Gloves (132 lbs), Knoxville, Tennessee, March 1979:

- Defeated Arnaldo Maura RSC 3 (1:10; Maura died of sustained injuries four days later, on March 20 in East Tennessee Baptist Hospital following brain surgery)

(gold) National Golden Gloves (132 lbs), Indianapolis, Indiana, March 1979:

- 1/2: Defeated Melvin Paul by decision
- Finals: Defeated Efrain Nieves by decision

(gold) National Sports Festival (139 lbs), July 1979:

- (no data available)

Pan Am Trials (132 lbs), Toledo, Ohio, May–June 1979:

- 1/2: Defeated Robert Hines by decision
- Finals: Lost to Davey Armstrong by decision

USA–FRG Duals (139 lbs), Rapid City, South Dakota, August 1979:

- Defeated Werner Schäfer (West Germany) by unanimous decision, 3–0

Nashville Sheriff's Dept. vs. Jackson Boxing Club (139 lbs), Clearview Shopping Center gym, Mount Juliet, Tennessee, January 1980:

- Defeated Will Sommerville

Jackson Boxing Club vs. Nashville Sheriff's Dept. (139 lbs), Jackson Coliseum, Jackson, Tennessee, February 1980:

- (no data available)

(gold) 46th Midstate Golden Gloves Tournament (139 lbs), Franklin Optimist Center, Franklin, Tennessee, February 1980:

- Defeated Freddie Bostic RSCH 2

USA–Cuba Duals (139 lbs), Charlotte Coliseum, Charlotte, North Carolina, February 1980:

- Defeated Armando Martínez (Cuba) by decision

(gold) Southern Golden Gloves (139 lbs), Knoxville, Tennessee, March 1980:

- (no data available)

GDR–USA Duals (139 lbs), Schwerin, East Germany, March 1980:

- Defeated Karl-Heinz Krüger (East Germany) by unanimous decision, 3–0

GDR–USA Duals (139 lbs), Rostock, East Germany, March 1980:

- Defeated Dietmar Schwarz (East Germany) by decision

USA–Scandinavia Duals (139 lbs), Biloxi, Mississippi, April 1980:

- Defeated Fleming Pederson (Denmark) KO 2

Southern AAU Tournament (139 lbs), Franklin Optimist Center, Franklin, Tennessee, April 1980:

- Defeated Walter Webster by medical walkover

(gold) United States National Championships (139 lbs), Caesars Palace, Las Vegas, Nevada, May 1980:

- 1/2: Defeated Harry Arroyo by decision
- Finals: Defeated Darryl Anthony by unanimous decision, 5–0 (Anthony suffered a broken nose in the 1st rd)

Olympic Trials (139 lbs), Atlanta, Georgia, June 1980:

- 1/4: Defeated Darryl Anthony by unanimous decision, 5–0 (Bumphus was given a standing eight count at 2:00 of the 3rd rd)
- 1/2: Defeated Terry Silver DQ 3 (Silver disqualified for constantly avoiding any action against the dominating opponent; Silver reportedly had injured right shoulder)
- Finals: Defeated Ronnie Shields by unanimous decision, 5–0 (Shields staggered in the beginning of the 2nd rd; Bumphus staggered midway through the 2nd rd)

(gold) National Junior Olympics Multi-Sports Festival (139 lbs), Santa Clara University, Santa Clara, California, August 1980:

- (no data available)

Bumphus finished his amateur career at 341–16, (or 354–16.)

=== Olympics ===
Bumphus qualified at 139 pounds and was a member of the 1980 U.S. Olympic boxing team that died in the crash of LOT Polish Airlines Flight 007 in Warsaw, Poland, on March 14, 1980 en route to the USA vs. Poland Box-off as part of "USA vs. the World" event. Bumphus was not with the team. Among the USA Boxing teammates who were killed in the crash were Lemuel Steeples from St. Louis, Calvin Anderson from Connecticut, Paul Palomino - the brother of Carlos Palomino, George Pimental and the Olympic coach, Sarge Johnson. Members of the team who were also not aboard included Bobby Czyz, Alex Ramos and James Shuler.

Bumphus earned his place on the team with a win over Ronnie Shields. Bumphus did not compete in the Olympics, due to the 1980 Summer Olympics boycott. In 2007, he received one of 461 Congressional Gold Medals created especially for the spurned athletes.

His reaction to the LOT Polish Airlines Flight 7 crash, where several of his teammates were killed, was: "We were going in the same direction a week ahead on the same plane and everything, so I'm just grateful it wasn't me that went down in the crash."

== Professional career ==
Dubbed "Bump City", Bumphus began his professional career as a hot prospect, winning his first 22 fights, including the vacant WBA Light Welterweight Title with a decision win over Lorenzo Luis Garcia in 1984. Bumphus lost the belt to Gene Hatcher in June 1984 in Buffalo, New York. Hatcher scored an 11th-round technical knockout that had Hatcher knocking Bumphus down, then slipping and falling on a follow-up attempt, then throwing Bumphus down to the mat when both fighters clinched. A post-fight melee in the ring then ensued, as Hatcher was celebrating in triumph while the now-deposed champion was slugging away in frustration. The fight was named as Ring magazine's Upset of the year for 1984. In 1987, Bumphus took on Lloyd Honeyghan for the WBC and IBF Welterweight Title, but lost via a second-round technical knockout. He retired after the loss, with a record of 29-2-0.

Those in Tacoma's Hilltop area knew of the lure drugs had for Bumphus. Towards the end of his boxing career he developed an addiction to cocaine, which he briefly kicked. When he returned to Tacoma, through a series of bad friends and choices, he resumed taking drugs in 1989, becoming addicted to crack cocaine. In 1995, he spent a year in rehab, and then left Tacoma to work as a trainer for his former manager Lou Duva in West Palm Beach, Florida.

As a trainer, he worked with Kassim Ouma and Emmett Linton.

== Professional boxing record ==
31 fights	29 wins	2 losses
By knockout	20	2
By decision	9	0

No.	Result	Record	Opponent	Type	Round, time	Date	Location	Notes
31	Loss	29–2	Lloyd Honeyghan	TKO	2 (15)	1987-02-22	Grand Hall, Wembley, England, U.K.	For WBC, IBF & The Ring welterweight titles
30	Win	29–1	Marlon Starling	TD	6 (12)	1986-05-18	Civic Center, Providence, Rhode Island, U.S.	Won USBA welterweight title
29	Win	28–1	JD Dobbins	TKO	3 (10)	1986-02-25	Harrah's Marina Hotel Casino, Atlantic City, New Jersey, U.S.	
28	Win	27–1	Allen Clarke	TKO	4 (10)	1985-12-10	Harrah's Marina Hotel Casino, Atlantic City, New Jersey, U.S.	
27	Win	26–1	Richard Beranek	TKO	5 (10)	1985-05-22	Harrah's Marina Hotel Casino, Atlantic City, New Jersey, U.S.	
26	Win	25–1	Randy Mitchem	RTD	3 (10)	1984-12-26	Harrah's Marina Hotel Casino, Atlantic City, New Jersey, U.S.	
25	Win	24–1	Martin Rojas	UD	10 (10)	1984-10-31	Harrah's Marina Hotel Casino, Atlantic City, New Jersey, U.S.	
24	Win	23–1	Ralph Twinning	UD	10 (10)	1984-08-29	Sands Casino Hotel, Atlantic City, New Jersey, U.S.	
23	Loss	22–1	Gene Hatcher	TKO	11 (15)	Jun 1, 1984	Memorial Auditorium, Buffalo, New York, U.S.	Lost WBA light welterweight title
22	Win	22–0	Lorenzo Garcia	UD	15 (15)	1984-01-22	Sands Casino Hotel, Atlantic City, New Jersey, U.S.	Won vacant WBA light welterweight title
21	Win	21–0	Jose Angulo	TKO	10 (10)	1983-09-22	Sands Casino Hotel, Atlantic City, New Jersey, U.S.	
20	Win	20–0	Adriano Marrero	TKO	8 (10)	1983-08-16	Playboy Hotel & Casino, Atlantic City, New Jersey, U.S.	
19	Win	19–0	Michael Bradley	KO	6 (12)	1983-04-02	Lancaster Host Resort, Lancaster, Pennsylvania, U.S.	Won vacant USBA light welterweight title
18	Win	18–0	Randy Shields	TKO	8 (10)	1983-02-19	Showboat Hotel and Casino, Las Vegas, Nevada, U.S.	
17	Win	17–0	Pat Jefferson	TKO	7 (10)	1982-11-24	Resorts Casino Hotel, Atlantic City, New Jersey, U.S.	
16	Win	16–0	Pat Hallacy	UD	10 (10)	1982-10-23	Lancaster Host Resort, Lancaster, Pennsylvania, U.S.	
15	Win	15–0	Ricardo Jimenez	TKO	8 (10)	1982-08-22	Great Gorge Playboy Club, McAfee, New Jersey, U.S.	
14	Win	14–0	Eduardo Lugo	TKO	5 (10)	1982-07-27	Tropicana Hotel & Casino, Atlantic City, New Jersey, U.S.	
13	Win	13–0	Marvin Jenkins	TKO	2 (10)	1982-03-02	Tropicana Hotel & Casino, Atlantic City, New Jersey, U.S.	
12	Win	12–0	Willie Rodriguez	UD	12 (12)	1981-10-31	Sands Casino Hotel, Atlantic City, New Jersey, U.S.	Won USBA light welterweight title
11	Win	11–0	JJ Cottrell	UD	10 (10)	1981-09-24	Hacienda Hotel, Paradise, Nevada, U.S.	
10	Win	10–0	Dale Hernandez	TKO	5 (?)	1981-08-23	Freeman Coliseum, San Antonio, Texas, U.S.	
9	Win	9–0	Armando Ramirez	KO	4 (8)	1981-06-21	Playboy Hotel & Casino, Atlantic City, New Jersey, U.S.	
8	Win	8–0	Arcenio Green	TKO	7 (8)	1981-05-23	Teatro Ariston, San Remo, Italy	
7	Win	7–0	Norberto Figueroa	TKO	2 (?)	1981-04-12	Ballys Park Place Hotel Casino, Atlantic City, New Jersey, U.S.	
6	Win	6–0	Jackie Morrell	TKO	4 (6)	1981-03-28	Carrier Dome, Syracuse, New York, U.S.	
5	Win	5–0	Victor Pappa	UD	8 (8)	1981-02-08	Great Gorge Playboy Club, McAfee, New Jersey, U.S.	
4	Win	4–0	Jose Angel Medina	KO	2 (6)	1981-01-16	HemisFair Arena, San Antonio, Texas, U.S.	
3	Win	3–0	Norberto Figueroa	PTS	6 (6)	1980-12-20	Kingsbridge Armory, The Bronx, New York, U.S.	
2	Win	2–0	Ken Long	KO	1 (6)	1980-12-04	Resorts Casino Hotel, Atlantic City, New Jersey, U.S.	
1	Win	1–0	Mike Michaud	TKO	1 (6)	1980-11-08	Caesars Tahoe Cascade Showroom, Stateline, Nevada, U.S.	

== See also ==
- List of southpaw stance boxers
- List of world light-welterweight boxing champions

Sporting positions
Amateur boxing titles
Previous: Davey Armstrong	U.S. featherweight champion 1977	Next: Elichi Jumawan
Previous: Davey Armstrong	Golden Gloves lightweight champion 1979	Next: Melvin Paul
Previous: Lemuel Steeples	U.S. light welterweight champion 1980	Next: James Mitchell
Regional boxing titles
Preceded by Willie Rodriguez	USBA light welterweight Champion; October 31, 1981 – 1982; Vacated	Vacant Title next held by Bruce Curry
Vacant Title last held by Bruce Curry	USBA light welterweight Champion; April 2, 1983 – 1983; Vacated	Vacant Title next held by Gary Hinton
Preceded by Marlon Starling	USBA welterweight Champion; May 18, 1986 – 1986; Vacated	Vacant Title next held by Rollin Williams
World boxing titles
Vacant Title last held by Aaron Pryor	WBA light welterweight champion January 22, 1984 – June 1, 1984	Succeeded by Gene Hatcher
