= Gene Hatcher =

American boxer (born 1959)

Personal information
- Nickname: Mad Dog
- Born: Ronald Hatcher Jr. June 28, 1959 (age 67) Fort Worth, Texas, U.S.
- Height: 5 ft 8 in (173 cm)
- Weight: Light welterweight; Welterweight

Boxing career
- Reach: 70 in (178 cm)
- Stance: Orthodox

Boxing record
- Total fights: 39
- Wins: 32
- Win by KO: 23
- Losses: 7

Ronald Hatcher Jr. (born June 28, 1959), better known as Gene Hatcher, is an American former professional boxer who was world light welterweight champion. His nickname was "Mad Dog."

== Amateur career ==
Hatcher was a United States Amateur Champion. In 1980, he became National AAU Welterweight Champion.

== Early professional career ==
His most notable early win came against former WBC super featherweight champion Alfredo Escalera in 1982, when he won a ten-round decision. His next notable opponent, Tyrone Crawley, defeated him by a ten-round decision. He followed that with a rematch in 1983 with Escalera. In that fight, Hatcher was dropped in round six and subsequently lost a unanimous ten-round decision.

== Champion ==
After racking up a few wins, Hatcher faced WBA light welterweight champion Johnny Bumphus on June 1, 1984, in Buffalo, New York. In what Ring magazine called its "Upset of the Year," Hatcher scored an eleventh-round technical knockout over Bumphus. When Hatcher knocked Bumphus down, he slipped and fell on a follow-up attempt. He then threw Bumphus down to the mat when both fighters clinched. A post-fight melee in the ring ensued after the stoppage.

Hatcher's first defense was against Uby Sacco in December of the same year. He won a fifteen-round split decision. Sacco, however, won their July 1985 rematch (and title) with a ninth round knockout win in Italy (the fight was stopped by the referee because of a Hatcher cut). In Hatcher's next and last chance at a world crown, he lost by knockout in 45 seconds to Lloyd Honeyghan in August 1987, with Honeyghan's WBC and IBF welterweight belts being at stake.

== Post-championship career ==
After losing to Honeyghan, Hatcher continued to fight. He had seven more fights, losing two (one of which was to future world champion Aaron Davis). After a victory in Ft. Worth over Juan Martin Galvan in 1995, Hatcher retired.

== Professional boxing record ==
39 fights	32 wins	7 losses
By knockout	23	3
By decision	9	4

No.	Result	Record	Opponent	Type	Round, time	Date	Location	Notes
39	Win	32–7	Juan Martin Galvan	UD	8 (8)	1995-07-01	Fiesta Trade Market, Fort Worth, Texas, U.S.	
38	Win	31–7	Simon Moya	TKO	4 (6)	1993-08-26	Marriott Riverwalk, San Antonio, Texas, U.S.	
37	Win	30–7	Randolph Rezzaq	KO	1 (8)	1993-04-20	Gorman's Super Pro Gym, Fort Worth, Texas, U.S.	
36	Loss	29–7	Anthony Williams	TKO	7 (?)	1990-03-15	Fairmont Hotel, Dallas, Texas, U.S.	
35	Loss	29–6	Aaron Davis	UD	10 (10)	1989-09-14	Beacon Theatre, New York City, New York, U.S.	
34	Win	29–5	David Maldonado	KO	6 (10)	1988-10-23	Tarrant County Convention Center, Fort Worth, Texas, U.S.	
33	Win	28–5	Ron Johnson	UD	10 (10)	1988-06-16	Marriott Market Center, Dallas, Texas, U.S.	
32	Loss	27–5	Lloyd Honeyghan	TKO	1 (15)	1987-08-30	Plaza de Toros de Nueva Andalucía, Marbella, Spain	For WBC, IBF & The Ring welterweight titles
31	Loss	27–4	Frankie Warren	UD	10 (10)	1987-02-15	ARCO Arena, Sacramento, California, U.S.	
30	Win	27–3	Darryl Anthony	TKO	11 (12)	1986-10-24	Trump Plaza Hotel and Casino, Atlantic City, New Jersey, U.S.	Won vacant WBC Continental Americas welterweight title
29	Win	26–3	Ricardo Lomeli	KO	3 (10)	1986-09-23	Cowtown Coliseum, Fort Worth, Texas, U.S.	
28	Win	25–3	Sergio Valles	TKO	4 (10)	1986-08-08	El Paso Civic Center, El Paso, Texas, U.S.	
27	Win	24–3	Kevin Austin	SD	10 (10)	1986-02-04	Fiesta Plaza Mall, San Antonio, Texas, U.S.	
26	Loss	23–3	Ubaldo Néstor Sacco	TKO	9 (15)	1985-07-21	Casinò di Campione, Campione d'Italia, Italy	Lost WBA light welterweight title
25	Win	23–2	Ubaldo Néstor Sacco	SD	15 (15)	1984-12-15	Tarrant County Convention Center, Fort Worth, Texas, U.S.	Retained WBA light welterweight title
24	Win	22–2	Johnny Bumphus	TKO	11 (15)	Jun 1, 1984	Memorial Auditorium, Buffalo, New York, U.S.	Won WBA light welterweight title
23	Win	21–2	Hector Sifuentes	UD	10 (10)	1984-04-21	Will Rogers Memorial Center, Fort Worth, Texas, U.S.	
22	Win	20–2	Joe Manley	UD	12 (12)	1983-11-12	Showboat Hotel and Casino, Las Vegas, Nevada, U.S.	
21	Win	19–2	Eduardo Lugo	KO	4 (10)	1983-10-13	Registry Hotel Crystal Ballroom, Dallas, Texas, U.S.	
20	Win	18–2	Luis Rivera	KO	5 (?)	1983-08-08	Astro Arena, Houston, Texas, U.S.	
19	Loss	17–2	Alfredo Escalera	UD	10 (10)	1983-06-16	Madison Square Garden, New York City, New York, U.S.	
18	Win	17–1	Romero Sandoval	TKO	5 (12)	1983-02-25	Showboat Hotel and Casino, Las Vegas, Nevada, U.S.	
17	Win	16–1	Darrell Cottrell	TKO	7 (10)	1982-12-23	Showboat Hotel and Casino, Las Vegas, Nevada, U.S.	
16	Win	15–1	Anthony Bryant	TKO	3 (10)	1982-11-11	Memorial Hall, Brownwood, Texas, U.S.	
15	Loss	14–1	Tyrone Crawley	MD	10 (10)	1982-10-17	Claridge Hotel & Casino, Atlantic City, New Jersey, U.S.	
14	Win	14–0	Jerome Artis	TKO	7 (10)	1982-07-14	Will Rogers Memorial Center, Fort Worth, Texas, U.S.	
13	Win	13–0	Danny Favella	TKO	3 (10)	1982-06-10	Showboat Hotel and Casino, Las Vegas, Nevada, U.S.	
12	Win	12–0	Alfredo Escalera	UD	10 (10)	1982-04-09	Will Rogers Memorial Center, Fort Worth, Texas, U.S.	
11	Win	11–0	Charlie Allen	KO	2 (8)	1982-03-10	Civic Center, Lake Charles, Louisiana, U.S.	
10	Win	10–0	Ricardo Garcia	KO	3 (6)	1981-11-26	Hacienda Hotel, Paradise, Nevada, U.S.	
9	Win	9–0	Raul Trujillo	KO	2 (6)	1981-10-29	Will Rogers Memorial Center, Fort Worth, Texas, U.S.	
8	Win	8–0	Bobby Ray McMillan	TKO	4 (8)	1981-10-07	Civic Centre, Beaumont, Texas, U.S.	
7	Win	7–0	Milton Hall	TKO	4 (6)	1981-08-22	Showboat Hotel and Casino, Las Vegas, Nevada, U.S.	
6	Win	6–0	Dwayne Prim	TKO	6 (6)	1981-08-04	Billy Bob's Texas, Fort Worth, Texas, U.S.	
5	Win	5–0	Ramiro Pruneda	TKO	3 (6)	1981-07-17	Civic Centre, Beaumont, Texas, U.S.	
4	Win	4–0	Ali Hassan	PTS	6 (6)	1981-07-07	Billy Bob's Texas, Fort Worth, Texas, U.S.	
3	Win	3–0	Clyde Spencer	KO	1 (6)	1981-06-16	Billy Bob's Texas, Fort Worth, Texas, U.S.	
2	Win	2–0	Victor Hernandez	UD	6 (6)	1981-05-28	Hacienda Hotel, Paradise, Nevada, U.S.	
1	Win	1–0	Ken Sheppard	TKO	1 (6)	1981-04-23	Will Rogers Memorial Center, Fort Worth, Texas, U.S.	

== See also ==
- List of world light-welterweight boxing champions

Sporting positions
Amateur boxing titles
Previous: Donald Curry	U.S. welterweight champion 1980	Next: Darryl Robinson
Regional boxing titles
Vacant Title last held by Dave Hilton Jr.	WBC Continental Americas welterweight Champion; October 24, 1986 – 1987; Vacated	Vacant Title next held by Derrick Kelly
World boxing titles
Preceded by Johnny Bumphus	WBA light welterweight champion June 1, 1984 – July 21, 1985	Succeeded by Ubaldo Néstor Sacco
Awards
Previous: Gerrie Coetzee vs. Michael Dokes	The Ring Upset of the Year vs. Johnny Bumphus; 1984	Next: Michael Spinks vs. Larry Holmes I
