= Ray Mancini vs. Greg Haugen =

Tough Guys Don't Dance
- Date: April 3, 1992
- Venue: Reno-Sparks Convention Center, Reno, Nevada, U.S.
- Title(s) on the line: Vacant NABF light welterweight title

Tale of the tape
Boxer	Ray Mancini	Greg Haugen
Nickname	Boom Boom	Mutt
Hometown	Youngstown, Ohio, U.S.	Auburn, Washington, U.S.
Purse	$450,000	$550,000
Pre-fight record	29–4 (23 KO)	29–4 (1) (14 KO)
Age	31 years	31 years, 7 months
Height	5 ft 4 1/2 in (164 cm)	5 ft 6 in (168 cm)
Weight	140 lb (64 kg)	140 lb (64 kg)
Style	Orthodox	Orthodox
Recognition	former WBA; Lightweight Champion	WBC; No. 9 Ranked Light Welterweight; IBF; No. 11 Ranked Light Welterweight; 2-division champion

Result
- Haugen wins via seventh-round technical knockout

Ray Mancini vs. Greg Haugen, billed as Tough Guys Don't Dance, was a professional boxing match contested on April 3, 1993, for the vacant NABF light welterweight title.

== Background ==
In late January 1992, it was announced that former lightweight champion Ray Mancini would face 2-division world champion Greg Haugen for the vacant NABF light welterweight title. Mancini was returning to boxing for a second time after a three-year retirement following a split decision loss to Héctor Camacho, which was proceeded by a four-year retirement. Haugen, was trying to get back in contention in the light welterweight division after having won and then lost the WBO light welterweight to Camacho the previous year.

Despite his long layoff, Mancini predicted that he would score a knockout victory over Haugen. Mancini's prediction angered the verbose Haugen, who dismissed Mancini as a "punk" and promised "the more he runs his mouth, the worse he’ll be at the end of the fight. I want to punish him before I knock him out." Mancini, who had pursued an acting career after his first retirement in 1985, claimed that his return was about the "ultimate challenge" and "not about money." Haugen, however, dismissed Mancini's claims replying "Let’s face it, he needs the money. A challenge? Sure. The challenge is to keep from going broke."

Haugen and Mancini agreed to $100,000 bet on the outcome, but the Nevada State Athletic Commission notified the fighters that such bets between fighters were not allowed. Instead, the commission allowed promoter Dan Goossen to rewrite the fighter's contracts which stated the winner would get $550,000 and the loser $450,000 instead of their original purse of $500,000.

Goossen opted to air the fight independently on a pay-per-view service he called "GooseVision." Goossen's decision to go independent stemmed from the success of the Ray Mancini–Héctor Camacho, which was bought by roughly 300,000 homes. Veteran boxing commentator Al Bernstein and noted boxing sportswriter and historian Bert Sugar called the action with boxing writer Pedro Fernandez serving as the unofficial ringside scorer.

== Fight Details ==
Haugen dominated Mancini through six+ rounds. Mancini pressed forward, but appeared sluggish and struggled offensively and defensively as Haugen landed jabs and counterpunches almost at will, badly injuring Mancini's left eye which was swollen shut early in the early rounds and was frequently targeted by Haugen.

The end of the fight came during the final minute of the seventh round when Haugen countered a big Mancini right with a short right hand of his own. The blow sent Mancini Mancini down to his knees and into the ropes. Though able to beat referee Mills Lane's 10-count, Mancini was on wobbly legs and clearly hurt, causing Lane to stop the fight at 2:27 of the round.

== Aftermath ==
Immediately following his loss, Mancini announced his third and final retirement from boxing, stating to the media "I hope nobody is silly enough to ask if this is it. Yes it is." Mancini's ended his career with a record of 29–5, having lost each of his final four fights.

== Fight card ==
Confirmed bouts:

Weight Class	Weight		vs.		Method	Round	Notes
Light welterweight	140 lbs.	Greg Haugen	def.	Ray Mancini	TKO	7/12	^{note 1}
Middleweight	160 lbs.	Roy Jones Jr.	def.	Art Serwano	KO	1/10
Middleweight	160 lbs.	Pat Lawlor	def.	Tony Biglen	UD	10
Super Bantamweight	122 lbs.	Richard Duran	def.	Antonio Flores	UD	10
Lightweight	135 lbs.	Rafael Ruelas	def.	Francisco Lopez	TKO	1/8
Heavyweight	200+ lbs.	Mark Gastineau	def.	Lon Liebergen	TKO	1/6

^Note 1 For Vacant NABF Light Welterweight Title

== Broadcasting ==
Country	Broadcaster
United States	GooseVision Pay-Per-View

Preceded by vs. Héctor Camacho	Ray Mancini's bouts April 3, 1992	Retired
Preceded by vs. Alfonso Perez	Greg Haugen's bouts April 3, 1992	Succeeded by vs. Francisco Lopez
