= Miguel Santana =

Puerto Rican boxer

Miguel Santana (born February 9, 1965) is a former boxer from Puerto Rico. Santana was born in Canóvanas, Puerto Rico.

== Boxing career ==
Miguel Santana had an award winning amateur boxing career, training alongside a young Jose Antonio Rivera, who is a two division world champion himself. Santana and Rivera became lifelong friends during their teenage years.

Santana decided to become a professional in 1982, and he debuted by outpointing Angel Lopez over six rounds on March 21. Santana scored his first knockout on his next bout, on July 21, when he defeated Ramon Canales in the fourth round at San Juan. After one more win, Santana faced Joe Rivera, on March 21, 1983 in Bayamon. Santana knocked Rivera out in the fourth round. Half a decade later, Rivera would unsuccessfully challenge for world titles, drawing (tying) and losing to Brian Mitchell in fifteen and twelve rounds respectively, and being knocked out in seven by Juan Martin Coggi.

Santana won his next five bouts, and, on September 1, 1984, he fought for his first title. Santana beat Javier Fragoso, a veteran who had fought Julio César Chávez, by a knockout in the sixth round in Carolina to win the Puerto Rican national title. Even as he was undefeated before his fight with Fragoso, Santana was largely unknown and became a celebrity in Puerto Rico only after winning the national belt.

Santana defended his national title successfully three times and won one more bout before facing Orlando Romero Uribe (not to be confused with Orlando Romero, another Peruvian boxer who challenged for a world title in 1983) in Miami Beach on December 3, 1985. He beat the Peruvian boxer by a fourth round knockout.

A new Puerto Rican television channel, Tele Once, began broadcasting boxing fights weekly immediately after it was launched. Although Tele Once largely dedicated their weekly boxing show to local fights, Santana became known by television viewers in his island, with Ivonne Class and Felo Ramirez. Tele Once's boxing commentators, speaking about him regularly. Santana won three fights in 1986 before meeting Terrence Alli on September 27 of that year, as part of the program where Lloyd Honeyghan upset Donald Curry with a seventh round knockout in Atlantic City, New Jersey. Their bout was televised to Puerto Rico by one of Tele Once's two major competitors, WAPA-TV. Santana entered the ring that night undefeated in 19 bouts, with 11 knockout wins. In a bout for the vacant, regional USBA Lightweight title, Santana lost a 12 round unanimous decision to the Guyanese, despite hurting Alli in the last round. On December 19, he returned with a sixth round knockout win over Felix Gonzalez, once again in Atlantic City.

On July 25, 1987, Santana faced Pernell Whitaker, who defeated Santana by a sixth round knockout for the NABF and USBA lightweight titles in Norfolk, Virginia. After losing a ten round decision to Terrence Alli in a rematch, Santana got a chance to challenge IBF world Lightweight champion Greg Haugen for the world title on April 11, 1988.

The fight had some rare circumstances surrounding it, mostly because Santana had lost twice in a row coming into his challenge for a world title. For ten rounds in Spokane, Washington, the two boxers fought a close bout, but the fight had to be stopped because of a headbutt in round eleven and, since it had already passed the fourth round, the judges' scorecards were collected to declare the winner. It was a highly controversial bout, because Santana was announced as the winner and new world champion by a technical decision, but, about twenty minutes later, one of the judges claimed he had miscalculated his scorecard and he had Haugen ahead, not Santana, so the fight's result was changed and Haugen declared the winner instead, by technical decision also. Angered at what happened in Washington state, Santana launched an investigation into the fight. Eighteen years later the decision was reversed and Santana was awarded the title.

Santana went on boxing until 1998, but he was largely reduced to a journeyman boxer (that is, a boxer who usually loses to his opponents) and he lost 16 of his next 21 bouts before retiring for good. Among the fighters he lost to during that phase of his career were Todd Foster, Santos Cardona, Glenwood Brown, Willy Wise (who would go on to beat Chávez and lose to the Mexican fighter in a rematch) Ray Oliveira and, in Santana's last fight, Wilfredo Negron. Santana retired with 25 wins, 20 losses and 2 draws, 14 of his wins coming by way of knockout.

== After boxing ==
Miguel Santana led a mostly quiet life after he retired from professional boxing, staying friends with Jose Antonio Rivera.

Early in 2006, Santana and Rivera spoke in Puerto Rico, and Santana told Rivera that the IBF had told him they may recognize him as a former world Lightweight champion on that boxing group. Apparently, there had been a breakthrough in the investigation that Santana conducted after his fight with Haugen, as Haugen had been a large betting favorite for their fight. Combined with the fact that the one judge who had Santana ahead and later claimed to have committed a mistake in adding his numbers took 20 minutes to make his claim, the IBF was convinced that foul play may have taken place after the Santana-Haugen affair.

In June 2006, the IBF announced that they would take the unprecedented move of making Santana a world champion by recognizing him as IBF world Lightweight champion in 1988. Although his loss to Haugen stood, the IBF announced it would include Santana in its list of world boxing champions and send him an IBF world title belt. The next day, however, Miryam Muhammad, IBF president, said that the IBF had changed their mind, and Santana would not be presented with a title belt, being honored at a lunch instead. However, Muhammad also said she is studying whether to award Santana the belt or not. Should the IBF recognize Santana as a past champion, Santana would become the fighter who waited the longest in history to find out he had become a world champion after his title fight was over, as it would come about 18 years after Santana's championship bout with Haugen.

Santana currently lives in Bayamón.
