= Greg Haugen =

American boxer (1960–2025)

Personal information
- Nickname: Mutt
- Born: Gregory Lee Haugen; August 31, 1960 Auburn, Washington, U.S.
- Died: February 23, 2025 (aged 64) Auburn, Washington, U.S.
- Height: 5 ft 6 in (168 cm)
- Weight: Lightweight; Light welterweight; Welterweight

Boxing career
- Reach: 67 in (170 cm)
- Stance: Orthodox

Boxing record
- Total fights: 53
- Wins: 40
- Win by KO: 19
- Losses: 10
- Draws: 1
- No contests: 2

Gregory Lee Haugen (August 31, 1960 – February 23, 2025) was an American professional boxer from 1982 to 1999. He was a world champion in two weight classes, having held the International Boxing Federation (IBF) lightweight title twice between 1986 and 1989 and the World Boxing Organization (WBO) light welterweight title in 1991.

== Professional career ==
Haugen turned professional in 1982 and won his first 17 fights before challenging for a world title. On December 5, 1986, Haugen captured the IBF lightweight title with a majority decision over reigning champion Jimmy Paul.

He lost his title in his first defense to Vinny Pazienza by decision. However, he won the title back in a rematch with Pazienza in 1988. He defended the title against Miguel Santana and future WBO welterweight champion Gert Bo Jacobsen.

He lost the IBF lightweight title to Pernell Whitaker in 1989 by decision, it was his biggest paycheck at that time at $426,000.

On February 23, 1991, he captured the WBO light welterweight title with an upset victory over then undefeated Hector Camacho by split decision, an outcome that resulted from Camacho being deducted a point for illegally hitting Haugen when Haugen refused to touch gloves at the beginning of the last round. After his fight with Camacho; Haugen tested positive for marijuana and was fined $25,000. Later that year Haugen lost a rematch with Camacho, again by split decision.

In 1992, he captured the vacant NABF light welterweight title with a knockout win over Ray "Boom Boom" Mancini.

On February 20, 1993, he challenged Mexican legend Julio César Chávez for the WBC light welterweight title at Azteca Stadium in Mexico City, a fight attended by 132,247 spectators. Leading up to the bout, Haugen made the comment that many of Chavez's wins "came against Tijuana taxi drivers that my mom could whip." This generated a huge uproar in the Mexican community and ignited publicity for the bout. Within seconds of the opening round, Chavez dropped Haugen with a straight right hand, but rather than dispatching him quickly, pulled back with the intent of punishing him for his pre-fight remarks. After several more rounds of punishment, Chavez dropped him again in the 5th round, and after delivering another barrage of punches, the referee intervened and waved it off. It marked the first stoppage loss of Haugen's career. Afterwards, Haugen remarked: "They must have been very tough taxi drivers." Haugen never again challenged for a major belt. When asked in an interview who was the greatest fighter he ever fought, Haugen replied, "Hands down, Pernell Whitaker.”

He retired in 1999 with a record of 40–10–1 (2 NC).

== Death ==
Haugen died from cancer in Auburn, Washington, on February 23, 2025, at the age of 64.

== Professional boxing record ==
53 fights	40 wins	10 losses
By knockout	19	3
By decision	21	7
Draws	1	
No contests	2	

No.	Result	Record	Opponent	Type	Round, time	Date	Location	Notes
53	NC	40–10–1 (2)	Paul Nave	NC	12	Dec 17, 1999	Veteran's Memorial Auditorium, San Rafael, California, U.S.	WBF welterweight title at stake; Originally ruled a draw, later ruled a NC after Haugen failed a drug test
52	Loss	40–10–1 (1)	Thomas Damgaard	RTD	6 (8)	Sep 3, 1999	K.B. Hallen, Copenhagen, Denmark	
51	Loss	40–9–1 (1)	Henry Hughes	PTS	10	Jun 11, 1999	Turning Stone Resort Casino, Verona, New York, U.S.	
50	Win	40–8–1 (1)	Grover Wiley	UD	10	Apr 24, 1999	Arts Museum, Portland, Oregon, U.S.	
49	Win	39–8–1 (1)	Rudy Lovato	UD	8	Feb 27, 1999	Emerald Queen Casino, Tacoma, Washington, U.S.	
48	Win	38–8–1 (1)	Paul Nave	SD	12	Nov 20, 1998	Veteran's Memorial Auditorium, San Rafael, California, U.S.	Won WBF welterweight title
47	Loss	37–8–1 (1)	Paul Nave	UD	12	Mar 27, 1998	Veteran's Memorial Auditorium, San Rafael, California, U.S.	For vacant WBF welterweight title
46	Win	37–7–1 (1)	Mark Fernandez	UD	10	Sep 19, 1997	Emerald Queen Casino, Tacoma, Washington, U.S.	
45	Draw	36–7–1 (1)	Greg Johnson	SD	10	Apr 25, 1997	Tacoma Dome, Tacoma, Washington, U.S.	
44	Win	36–7 (1)	Jesus Mayorga	UD	10	Feb 15, 1997	Tacoma Dome, Tacoma, Washington, U.S.	
43	Loss	35–7 (1)	Oscar Gabriel Gonzalez	MD	10 (10)	Dec 15, 1995	Sundome, Yakima, Washington, U.S.	
42	Win	35–6 (1)	Mark Brannon	TKO	4 (10)	Jan 21, 1995	Arizona Charlie's, Las Vegas, Nevada, U.S.	
41	Loss	34–6 (1)	Tony Lopez	TKO	10 (10)	Jun 25, 1994	MGM Grand Garden Arena, Paradise, Nevada, U.S.	
40	Win	34–5 (1)	Ray Garcia	KO	6 (10)	Feb 24, 1994	Marriott Hotel, Irvine, California, U.S.	
39	Win	33–5 (1)	Darren Brennan	TKO	6 (10)	Jan 21, 1994	Foxwoods Resort Casino, Ledyard, Connecticut, U.S.	
38	Loss	32–5 (1)	Julio César Chávez	TKO	5 (12)	Feb 20, 1993	Estadio Azteca, Mexico City, Mexico	For WBC light welterweight title
37	Win	32–4 (1)	Armando Campas	UD	10 (10)	Dec 13, 1992	The Mirage, Las Vegas, Nevada, U.S.	
36	Win	31–4 (1)	Francisco Lopez	KO	2 (10)	Jul 7, 1992	Hollywood Palladium, Hollywood, California, U.S.	
35	Win	30–4 (1)	Ray Mancini	TKO	7 (12)	Apr 3, 1992	Reno-Sparks Convention Center, Reno, Nevada, U.S.	Won vacant NABF light welterweight title
34	Win	29–4 (1)	Alfonso Perez	RTD	8 (10)	Oct 29, 1991	Country Club, Reseda, California, U.S.	
33	Loss	28–4 (1)	Héctor Camacho	SD	12	May 18, 1991	Reno-Sparks Convention Center, Reno, Nevada, U.S.	Lost WBO light welterweight title
32	Win	28–3 (1)	Héctor Camacho	SD	12	Feb 23, 1991	Caesars Palace, Paradise, Nevada, U.S.	Won WBO light welterweight title
31	Win	27–3 (1)	Billy Young	UD	10	Dec 20, 1990	Bally's Las Vegas, Paradise, Nevada, U.S.	
30	Win	26–3 (1)	Tommy Hanks	UD	10	Nov 29, 1990	Horizon Casino Resort, Stateline, Nevada, U.S.	
29	Loss	25–3 (1)	Vinny Paz	UD	10	Aug 5, 1990	Trump Plaza Hotel and Casino, Atlantic City, New Jersey, U.S.	
28	Win	25–2 (1)	Robert Nunez	RTD	6 (10)	Jun 4, 1990	Bally's Reno, Reno, Nevada, U.S.	
27	Win	24–2 (1)	Guillermo Cruz	TKO	10 (10)	Mar 10, 1990	Dunes Hotel and Casino, Paradise, Nevada, U.S.	
26	Loss	23–2 (1)	Pernell Whitaker	UD	12	Feb 18, 1989	The Coliseum, Hampton, Virginia, U.S.	Lost IBF lightweight title
25	Win	23–1 (1)	Gert Bo Jacobsen	TKO	10 (12)	Oct 28, 1988	Brøndbyhallen, Brøndby, Denmark	Retained IBF lightweight title
24	Win	22–1 (1)	Miguel Santana	TD	11 (15)	Apr 11, 1988	Tacoma Dome, Tacoma, Washington, U.S.	Retained IBF lightweight title
23	Win	21–1 (1)	Vinny Paz	UD	15	Feb 6, 1988	Boardwalk Hall, Atlantic City, New Jersey, U.S.	Won IBF lightweight title
22	Win	20–1 (1)	Derrick McGuire	TKO	6 (10)	Dec 16, 1987	Showboat Hotel and Casino, Las Vegas, Nevada, U.S.	
21	Loss	19–1 (1)	Vinny Paz	UD	15	Jun 7, 1987	Civic Center, Providence, Rhode Island, U.S.	Lost IBF lightweight title
20	Win	19–0 (1)	Jimmy Paul	MD	15	Dec 5, 1986	Caesars Palace, Paradise, Nevada, U.S.	Won IBF lightweight title
19	Win	18–0 (1)	Ernie Landeros	UD	10	Aug 19, 1986	Sahara Hotel & Casino, Winchester, Nevada, U.S.	
18	Win	17–0 (1)	Edwin Curet	UD	12	May 23, 1986	Showboat Hotel and Casino, Las Vegas, Nevada, U.S.	Won vacant NABF lightweight title
17	Win	16–0 (1)	Ken Willis	UD	10	Mar 26, 1986	Showboat Hotel and Casino, Las Vegas, Nevada, U.S.	
16	Win	15–0 (1)	Juan Carlos Alvarado	TKO	9 (10)	Feb 16, 1986	MGM Grand Reno, Reno, Nevada, U.S.	
15	Win	14–0 (1)	Charlie Brown	TKO	1 (10)	Jan 3, 1986	Showboat Hotel and Casino, Las Vegas, Nevada, U.S.	
14	Win	13–0 (1)	Chris Calvin	TKO	6 (10)	Nov 6, 1985	Showboat Hotel and Casino, Las Vegas, Nevada, U.S.	
13	Win	12–0 (1)	Freddie Roach	TKO	7 (10)	Aug 22, 1985	Showboat Hotel and Casino, Las Vegas, Nevada, U.S.	
12	Win	11–0 (1)	Jeff Bumpus	UD	10	Jul 17, 1985	Resorts Casino Hotel, Atlantic City, New Jersey, U.S.	
11	NC	10–0 (1)	Juan del Toro	NC	1 (8)	Mar 7, 1985	Mountaineers Building, Seattle, Washington, U.S.	
10	Win	10–0	Ted Michaliszyn	TKO	7 (8)	Feb 7, 1985	Mountaineers Building, Seattle, Washington, U.S.	
9	Win	9–0	Tony Villa	KO	2 (6)	Sep 27, 1984	Showboat Hotel and Casino, Las Vegas, Nevada, U.S.	
8	Win	8–0	Ted Michaliszyn	UD	6	Sep 20, 1984	Showboat Hotel and Casino, Las Vegas, Nevada, U.S.	
7	Win	7–0	Roosevelt Booth	UD	4	Jul 22, 1983	Galt Ocean Mile Hotel, Fort Lauderdale, Florida, U.S.	
6	Win	6–0	Chuck Peralta	UD	10	Apr 26, 1983	Red Lion Inn, SeaTac, Washington, U.S.	
5	Win	5–0	Larry Yazzie	TKO	2 (10)	Mar 29, 1983	Red Lion Inn, SeaTac, Washington, U.S.	
4	Win	4–0	Max Cervantes	TKO	4 (10)	Feb 23, 1983	Red Lion Inn, SeaTac, Washington, U.S.	
3	Win	3–0	Joe Perez	UD	10	Jan 13, 1983	Paramount Theatre, Seattle, Washington, U.S.	
2	Win	2–0	Noel Arriesgado	KO	7 (?)	Dec 4, 1982	Tudor Club, Anchorage, Alaska, U.S.	
1	Win	1–0	Noel Arriesgado	PTS	3 (3)	Nov 4, 1982	Tudor Club, Anchorage, Alaska, U.S.	

== Titles in boxing ==
=== Major world titles ===
- IBF lightweight champion (135 lbs) (2x)
- WBC light welterweight champion (140 lbs)

=== Major world titles ===
- WBF welterweight champion (147 lbs)

=== Regional/International titles ===
- NABF lightweight champion (135 lbs)
- NABF light welterweight champion (140 lbs)

== See also ==
- List of world lightweight boxing champions
- List of world light-welterweight boxing champions

Sporting positions
Regional boxing titles
Vacant Title last held by Tyrone Crawley	NABF lightweight champion May 23, 1986 – December 5, 1986; Won world title	Vacant Title next held by Pernell Whitaker
Vacant Title last held by Tim Burgess	NABF light-welterweight champion April 3, 1992 – 1992; Vacated	Vacant Title next held by Héctor López
Minor World boxing titles
Vacant Title last held by Paul Nave	WBF welterweight champion November 20, 1998 – 1999; Retired	Vacant Title next held by Bruce Corby
Major World boxing titles
Preceded by Jimmy Paul	IBF lightweight champion December 5, 1986 – June 7, 1987	Succeeded by Vinny Paz
Preceded by Vinny Paz	IBF lightweight champion February 6, 1988 – February 18, 1989	Succeeded by Pernell Whitaker
Preceded by Héctor Camacho	WBO light-welterweight champion February 23, 1991 – May 18, 1991	Succeeded by Héctor Camacho
