= Lionel Butler =

American boxer

Personal information
- Nickname: The Train
- Born: July 25, 1967 (age 59) Bogalusa, Louisiana, U.S.
- Height: 5 ft 11 in (180 cm)
- Weight: Heavyweight

Boxing career
- Reach: 72 in (183 cm)
- Stance: Orthodox

Boxing record
- Total fights: 51
- Wins: 32
- Win by KO: 25
- Losses: 17
- Draws: 1
- No contests: 1

Lionel Butler (born July 25, 1967) is an American former professional boxer who competed from 1989 to 2010. He is best known for his 1995 fight with Lennox Lewis, but also faced world champions Tony Tubbs, James Smith, Chris Byrd, and Oliver McCall. Though he never held or challenged for a world title from any of the main four sanctioning bodies (WBC, IBF, WBA, WBO) outside of his eliminator bout with Lewis, he won the vacant IBO heavyweight title in 1993 and unsuccessfully challenged for the title again against Brian Nielsen in 1998.

== Professional career ==
Butler made his professional debut on February 24, 1989 in a losing effort to future contender Phil Jackson. In his second fight, Butler was knocked out in the second round by the debuting future undisputed heavyweight Champion Riddick Bowe on March 6, 1989. The following month, Butler would pick up his first victory against Michael Carroll. Butler struggled during the early portion of his career, going 6–10–1 in his first 17 fights; however, Butler's fortune would change in 1991, as he racked up three consecutive first-round knockouts during that year and followed with 13 more knockout victories from 1992 to 1994 (one victory was later changed to a no contest after Butler failed a drug test after the fight). During his 16-fight undefeated streak, Butler scored victories over such fighters as former WBA heavyweight champions Tony Tubbs (whom Butler dispatched in less than one round) and James "Bonecrusher" Smith, while also winning both the IBO and California heavyweight title on February 23, 1993 with a victory over Tony Willis. Butler's success was halted in 1993 when a positive test for marijuana earned Butler a six-month suspension and he was subsequently stripped of both heavyweight titles as a result. Butler rebounded and in 1995, now ranked the number two heavyweight by WBC would get his first high-profile match, as he was matched up against Lennox Lewis, who had recently lost his title to Oliver McCall, in a "eliminator" bout with the winner earning the right to fight for the WBC heavyweight championship. Butler, however, came into the fight grossly out of shape at 261 pounds (118 kg) and was thoroughly outboxed by Lewis, who knocked Butler out in the fifth round. Following his loss to Lewis, Butler was never quite able to reach the level of success he had obtained from 1991 to 1994. Butler would win the World Boxing Federation (WBF) heavyweight title on January 23, 1997 after defeating Marcos Gonzalez by first-round knockout, but would lose to up-and-coming heavyweights Chris Byrd and Michael Grant. In 1998, Butler would challenge the undefeated Danish boxer Brian Nielsen for the IBO heavyweight title, but was knocked out in the first round. Butler would then take a three-year hiatus from boxing before returning in January 2002. Butler would win the first four fights of his comeback before meeting the once highly regarded knockout artist Andre Purlette, who promptly knocked out Butler in the second round. Butler would again leave boxing after the Purlette fight, but would launch one more comeback in 2009. He would go 1–2 in three fights between 2009 and 2010 before retiring for good following a loss to Damian Wills on June 12, 2010.

== Professional boxing record ==
51 fights	32 wins	17 losses
By knockout	25	8
By decision	6	6
By disqualification	1	3
Draws	1	
No contests	1	

No.	Result	Record	Opponent	Type	Round, time	Date	Location	Notes
51	Loss	32–17–1 (1)	(United States) Damian Wills	UD	10	12 Jun 2010	(United States) Hollywood Palladium, Hollywood, California	
50	Loss	32–16–1 (1)	(Russia) Andrey Fedosov	KO	2 (8), 2:37	8 Jan 2010	(United States) Civic Auditorium, Glendale, California	
49	Win	32–15–1 (1)	(Cameroon) Fred Kassi	SD	6	10 Sep 2009	(United States) San Manuel Indian Casino, Highland, California	
48	Loss	31–15–1 (1)	(Guyana) Andre Purlette	TKO	2 (10), 1:53	9 Sep 2003	(United States) Level Nightclub, Miami, Florida	
47	Win	31–14–1 (1)	(United States) Dan Ward	TKO	3 (6)	30 Aug 2003	(United States) Sam's Town Casino, Tunica, Mississippi	
46	Win	30–14–1 (1)	(United States) John Dixon	KO	2 (6), 1:27	18 Jul 2003	(United States) Argosy Casino Atrium, Baton Rouge, Louisiana	
45	Win	29–14–1 (1)	(United States) Willie Driver	KO	3 (6)	2 Feb 2002	(United States) Grand Casino, Gulfport, Mississippi	
44	Win	28–14–1 (1)	(United States) Craig Brinson	UD	4	23 Jan 2002	(United States) Caesars Indiana, Bridgeport, Indiana	
43	Loss	27–14–1 (1)	(Denmark) Brian Nielsen	KO	1 (12), 2:37	6 Nov 1998	(Denmark) K.B. Hallen, Copenhagen	For IBO heavyweight title
42	Win	27–13–1 (1)	(United States) Cleveland Woods	TKO	9 (10), 2:09	28 Oct 1997	(United States) Orleans Hotel & Casino, Las Vegas, Nevada	
41	Loss	26–13–1 (1)	(United States) Michael Grant	DQ	4 (10), 0:38	19 Apr 1997	(United States) Las Vegas Hilton, Las Vegas, Nevada	Butler deducted points for a headbutt in 2nd, a low blow in 3rd, then DQed for another low blow in 4th
40	Win	26–12–1 (1)	(Mexico) Marcos Gonzalez	KO	1 (12), 2:36	23 Jan 1997	(United States) Country Club, Reseda, California	Won vacant WBF Heavyweight title
39	Win	25–12–1 (1)	(United States) Bomani Parker	KO	1 (10), 3:00	21 Nov 1996	(United States) Country Club, Reseda, California	
38	Win	24–12–1 (1)	(Mexico) Salvador Maciel	TKO	1 (10), 0:55	17 Oct 1996	(United States) Olympic Auditorium, Los Angeles, California	
37	Loss	23–12–1 (1)	(United States) Chris Byrd	TKO	8 (10), 0:57	23 Apr, 1996	(United States) The Palace, Auburn Hills, Michigan	
36	Win	23–11–1 (1)	(Mexico) Mauricio Villegas	TKO	2 (10), 2:11	18 Mar 1996	(United States) County Coliseum, El Paso, Texas	
35	Loss	22–11–1 (1)	(United Kingdom) Lennox Lewis	TKO	5 (12), 2:55	13 May 1995	(United States) ARCO Arena, Sacramento, California	WBC heavyweight title eliminator
34	Win	22–10–1 (1)	(United States) James Flowers	TKO	1 (10), 1:53	1 Mar 1995	(United States) Memorial Auditorium, Fort Lauderdale, Florida	
33	NC	21–10–1 (1)	(United States) Eric Curry	TKO	3 (10), 3:00	26 Apr 1994	(United States) The Palace, Auburn Hills, Michigan	Originally a TKO 3 win for Butler, changed to a NC as Butler tested positive for an illegal substance
32	Win	21–10–1	(United States) Jerry Jones	RTD	1 (10), 3:00	8 Feb 1994	(United States) Country Club, Reseda, California	Jones was unable to continue after round one due to a severe cut above the right eye.
31	Win	20–10–1	(United States) James Smith	TKO	3 (10), 2:19	18 Jan 1994	(United States) Civic Auditorium, Omaha, Nebraska	
30	Win	19–10–1	(United States) Lawrence Carter	TKO	1 (10) 2:39	16 Nov, 1993	(United States) Casino Magic, Bay Saint Louis, Mississippi	
29	Win	18–10–1	(United States) Tim Bullock	TKO	1 (?)	27 May 1993	(United States) Biloxi, Mississippi	
28	Win	17–10–1	(United States) Jesse Shelby	TKO	4 (?)	4 May 1993	(United States) McNichols Sports Arena, Denver, Colorado	
27	Win	16–10–1	(United States) Craig Payne	RTD	7 (10), 3:00	26 Mar 1993	(United States) Country Club, Reseda, California	The bout was halted after round 7 because of an injury to Payne's eye.
26	Win	15–10–1	(United States) Tony Willis	TKO	5 (10), 2:15	23 Feb 1993	(United States) Country Club, Reseda, California	Won vacant IBO Heavyweight title
25	Win	14–10–1	(United States) John Morton	TKO	5 (10), 2:43	4 Nov 1992	(United States) Country Club, Reseda, California	
24	Win	13–10–1	(United States) Tony Tubbs	KO	1 (10), 3:00	18 Aug 1992	(United States) Bayfront Auditorium, Pensacola, Florida	
23	Win	12–10–1	(United States) David Dixon	DQ	4 (?)	11 May 1992	(United States) Great Western Forum, Inglewood, California	Dixon was disqualified for repeatedly hitting low.
22	Win	11–10–1	(Mexico) Juan Ramon Perez	KO	1 (?)	31 Mar 1992	(United States) Country Club, Reseda, California	
21	Win	10–10–1	(United States) Sam Adkins	TKO	5 (?)	25 Feb 1992	(United States) Country Club, Reseda, California	
20	Win	9–10–1	(United States) Terry Verners	KO	1 (6)	17 Dec 1991	(United States) Country Club, Reseda, California	
19	Win	8–10–1	(United States) Dominic Parker	KO	1 (6)	26 Nov 1991	(United States) Country Club, Reseda, California	
18	Win	7–10–1	(United States) Don Askew	KO	1 (?)	29 Oct 1991	(United States) Country Club, Reseda, California	
17	Loss	6–10–1	(United States) Kevin Ford	SD	8	29 Apr 1991	(United States) Great Western Forum, Inglewood, California	
16	Win	6–9–1	(United States) James Ruffin	KO	1 (?), 0:40	5 Feb 1991	(United States) Longhorn Club, Vinton, Louisiana	
15	Loss	5–9–1	(United States) Terry Davis	DQ	2 (?)	1 Feb 1991	(United States) Richmond, California	
14	Loss	5–8–1	(United States) Terry Davis	DQ	5 (?)	14 Dec 1990	(United States) Brownsville, Texas	
13	Loss	5–7–1	(United States) Oliver McCall	SD	10	16 Jul 1990	(United States) Central Plaza Hotel, Oklahoma City, Oklahoma	
12	Draw	5–6–1	(United States) Sean McClain	TD	1 (6), 1:07	10 May 1990	(United States) Harrah's Tahoe, Lake Tahoe, Nevada	Originally announced as a disqualification win for McClain due to repeated low blows
11	Win	5–6	(Soviet Union) Vyacheslav Yakovlev	MD	6	12 Apr 1990	(Japan) Korakuen Hall, Tokyo	
10	Loss	4–6	(Australia) Craig Petersen	UD	6	24 Mar 1990	(United States) Fairgrounds Arena, Mobile, Alabama	
9	Win	4–5	(United States) Tim Adams	PTS	4	5 Mar 1990	(United States) Fairgrounds Arena, Mobile, Alabama	
8	Loss	3–5	(United States) Sammy Speech	UD	6	16 Feb 1990	(United States) Clarion Hotel Ballroom, St Louis, Missouri	
7	Win	3–4	(United States) Jerry Goff	TKO	2 (4)	25 Jan 1990	(United States) Municipal Auditorium, New Orleans, Louisiana	
6	Win	2–4	(United States) Troy Jefferson	UD	4	11 Jan 1990	(United States) New Orleans, Louisiana	
5	Loss	1–4	(United States) James Pritchard	TKO	6	9 Dec 1989	(United States) Biloxi, Mississippi	
4	Loss	1–3	(United States) Cleveland Woods	TKO	2 (4), 1:48	1 Aug 1989	(United States) Showboat Hotel & Casino, Las Vegas, Nevada	
3	Win	1–2	(United States) Michael Carroll	UD	6	1 Apr 1989	(United States) Biloxi, Mississippi	
2	Loss	0–2	(United States) Riddick Bowe	TKO	2 (4), 1:55	6 Mar 1989	(United States) Lawlor Events Center, Reno, Nevada	
1	Loss	0–1	(United States) Phil Jackson	PTS	4	24 Feb 1989	(United States) Biloxi, Mississippi	Professional debut

Sporting positions
Preceded by Pinklon Thomas	IBO Heavyweight Champion; 23 February 1993 – March 1993; Stripped	Succeeded by Danell Nicholson
Preceded by Adílson Rodrigues	WBF Heavyweight Champion; 23 January 1997 – 1997; Stripped	Succeeded by Bert Cooper
