= Saenger Theatre (New Orleans) =

Theater in New Orleans, Louisiana, United States

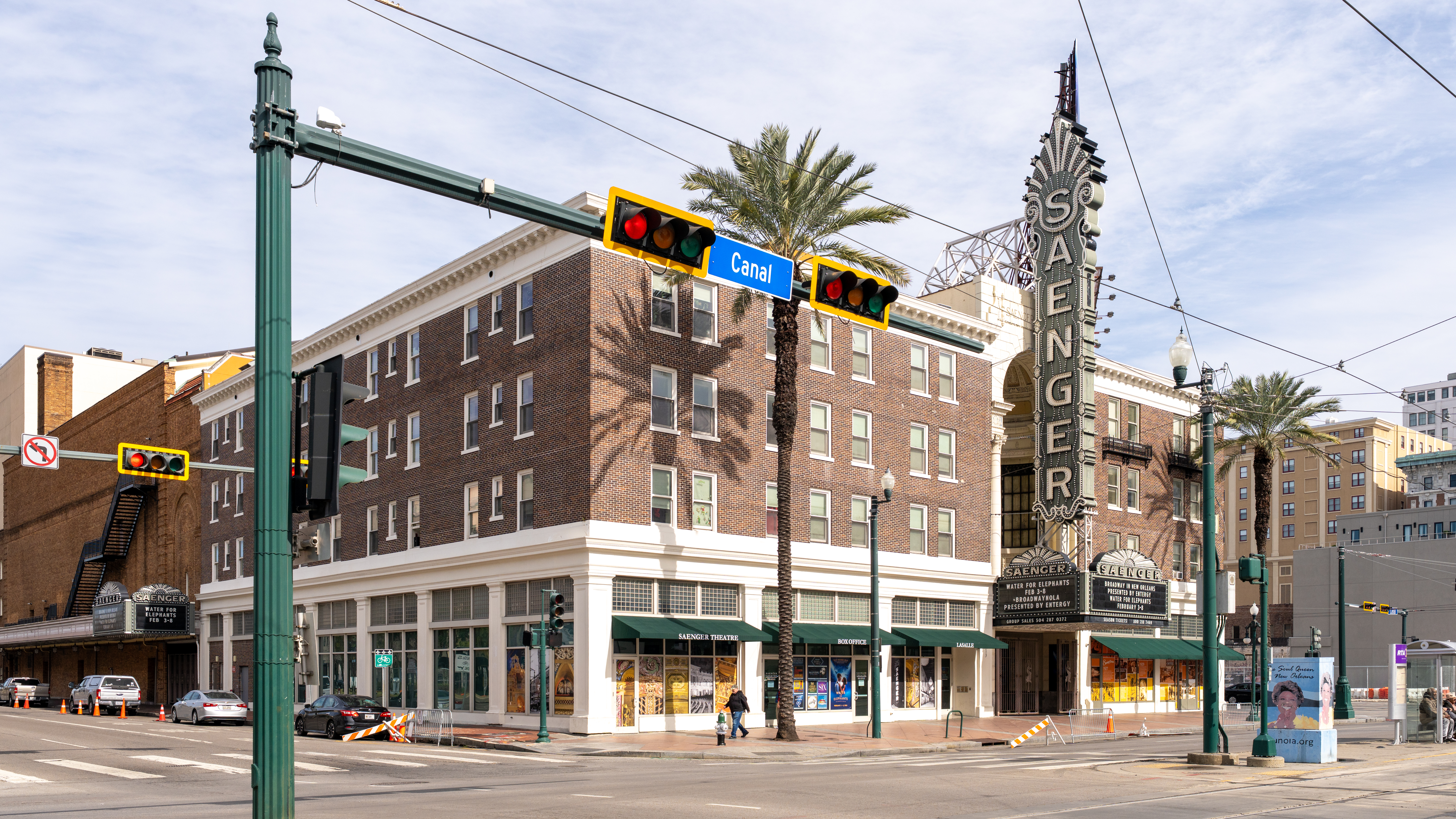
- Exterior of venue (2026)
- Interactive map of Saenger Theatre
- Address: 1111 Canal St; New Orleans, Louisiana 70112-2625
- Location: French Quarter
- Owner: Canal Street Development Corporation
- Operator: ATG Entertainment
- Capacity: 2,600

Construction
- Groundbreaking: 1924
- Opened: February 4, 1927
- Renovated: 1978-80, 2009-11
- Cost: $2.5 million ($47 million in 2025 dollars)
- Architect: Emile Weil

Website
- us.atgtickets.com/venues/saenger-theatre/whats-on/
- Saenger Theatre
- U.S. National Register of Historic Places
- Location within East New Orleans Location within Louisiana Location within the United States
- Coordinates: 29°57′20.87″N 90°4′22.24″W
- Architect: Emile Weil
- Architectural style: Italian Renaissance
- NRHP reference No.: 77000676
- Added to NRHP: November 25, 1977

Saenger Theatre is an atmospheric theatre in downtown New Orleans, Louisiana, which is on the National Register of Historic Places. Once the flagship of Julian and Abe Saenger's theatre empire, today it is one of only a handful of Saenger movie palaces that remain.

== History ==
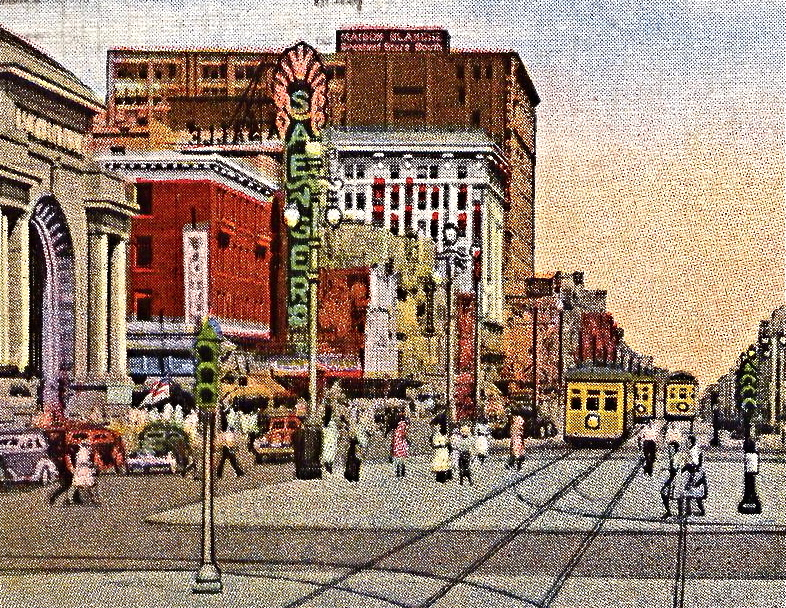
Postcard view of the Saenger on Canal Street, circa 1940.

=== Early decades ===
The Saenger Theatre opened on February 4, 1927. The 4,000-seat theatre took three years to build and cost $2.5 million. Its opening prompted thousands to parade along Canal Street. The top ticket price was 65 cents, and the bill for each performance included a silent movie and stage play (produced by the Paramount-Publix Corporation), and music from the Saenger Grand Orchestra.

Architect Emile Weil designed the interior of an atmospheric theatre to recall an Italian Baroque courtyard. Weil installed 150 lights in the ceiling of the theatre, arranged in the shape of constellations of the night sky. The theatre also employed special effects machines to project images of moving clouds, sunrises, and sunsets across the theatre's interior.

In 1929, Julian Saenger sold the theatre for $10 million to Paramount Publix, which continued to operate the theatre successfully throughout the Great Depression. In 1933 Paramount Publix converted the theatre to "talking pictures" only.

=== A neglected landmark ===
In 1964, ABC Interstate Theatres turned the Saenger into a piggyback theatre, building a wall in front of the balcony to divide the larger space into two smaller theatres. The upstairs theatre was known as the Saenger Orleans. On September 29, 1977, the theatre was designated a historic landmark by the New Orleans Landmark Commission. That December it was added to the National Register of Historic Places.

=== First renovation and return to prominence ===
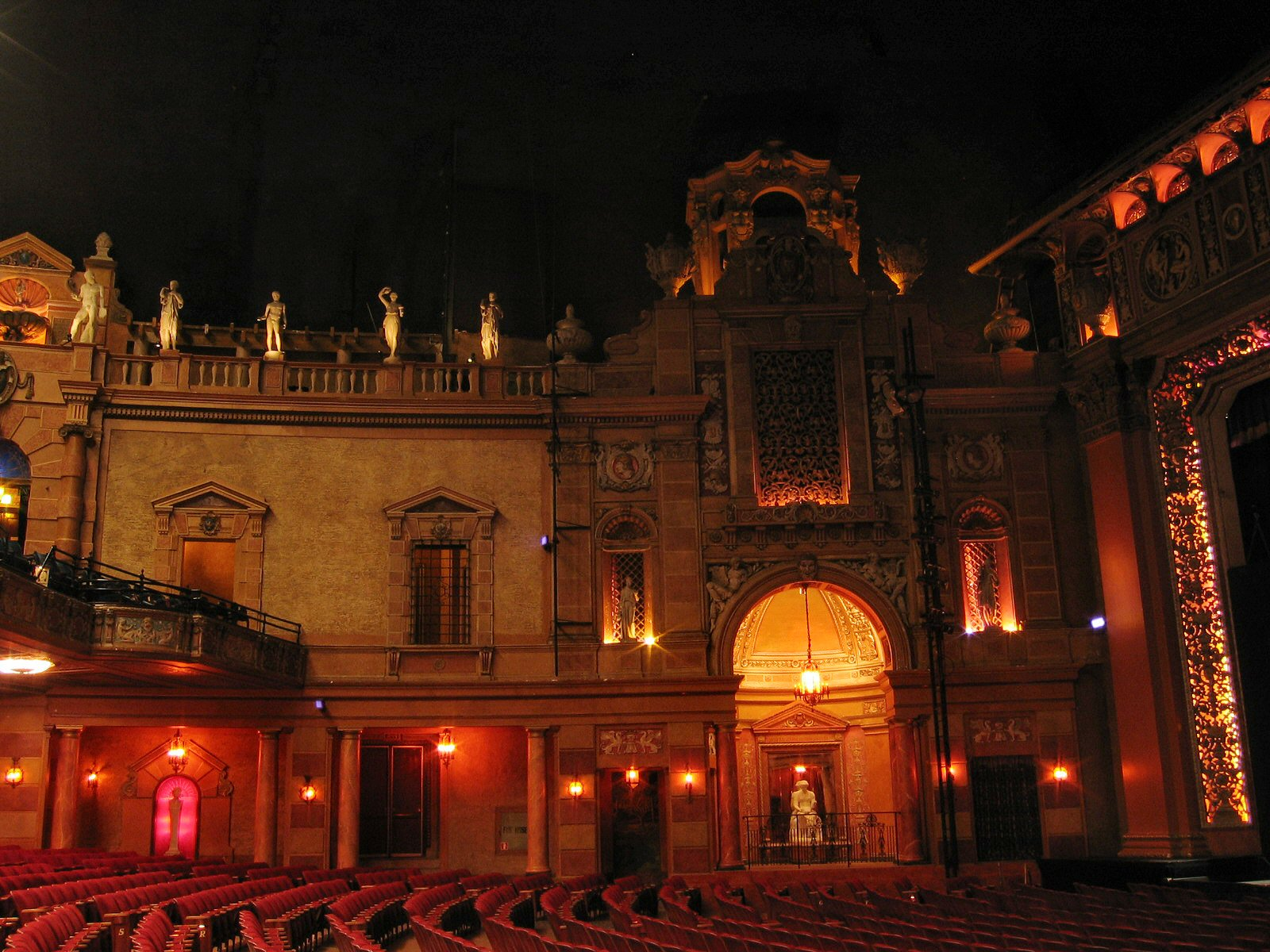
Interior before Katrina

In 1978, it was sold for slightly more than $1 million to E.B. Breazeale, who then spent an additional $3 million (with co-investors Zev Buffman and Barry Mendelson) renovating it into a performing arts center. Pace Management also invested in the renovation and was hired to run the theatre.

The Saenger Theatre reopened in 1980 with a reduced seating capacity of 2,736. Johnny Carson made a gala performance at the theatre's grand reopening. The Saenger hosted a variety of events, including concerts in many musical styles, theater shows, and presentations harkening back to the theatre's earlier history such as a showing of Abel Gance's Polyvision silent film spectacular Napoléon accompanied by a live full orchestra. In April 1983, Styx recorded and filmed their performances on their Kilroy Was Here tour for their double live album and concert film Caught in the Act. Then, in 1985, the management team of the theatre formed the Saenger Theatre Partnership, Ltd., a joint venture with 50 partners, to purchase the theatre from Breazeale.

In the summer of 2002, the Saenger Theatre continued its cinematic roots and showed three classic movies (Some Like It Hot, The Wizard of Oz and Gone with the Wind) in celebration of its 75th anniversary. The Summer Classic Movie Series became an annual event for the next 3 years.

=== Hurricane Katrina ===
When Hurricane Katrina hit New Orleans in 2005, the Saenger Theatre suffered significant water damage. The water line was approximately a foot above stage level, filling the basement and orchestra seating area. Fortunately it was in the middle of a major renovation, so all carpeting and seating had been removed in anticipation of being replaced. The vintage Robert Morton Wonder Organ at stage level suffered some damage. The administrative offices of the theatre and the box office on Rampart Street suffered extensive water damage. Photos taken immediately after Katrina often portrayed the Canal Street marquee as damaged, but staff had in fact removed the acrylic glass and other materials that could become flying debris during the storm.

=== Second renovation ===
In early 2009 it was announced by New Orleans officials that ownership of the Saenger Theatre would be turned over to the Canal Street Development Corp., a city agency, who would lease the building to the Saenger Theatre Partnership, Ltd. for 52 years. A stipulation of the deal requires the Saenger Theatre Partnership to host a minimum of 80 shows and sell 100,000 tickets each year. The unique alliance secured $15 million in federal grants, state and federal tax credits, and private financing as part of a $38.8 million restoration.

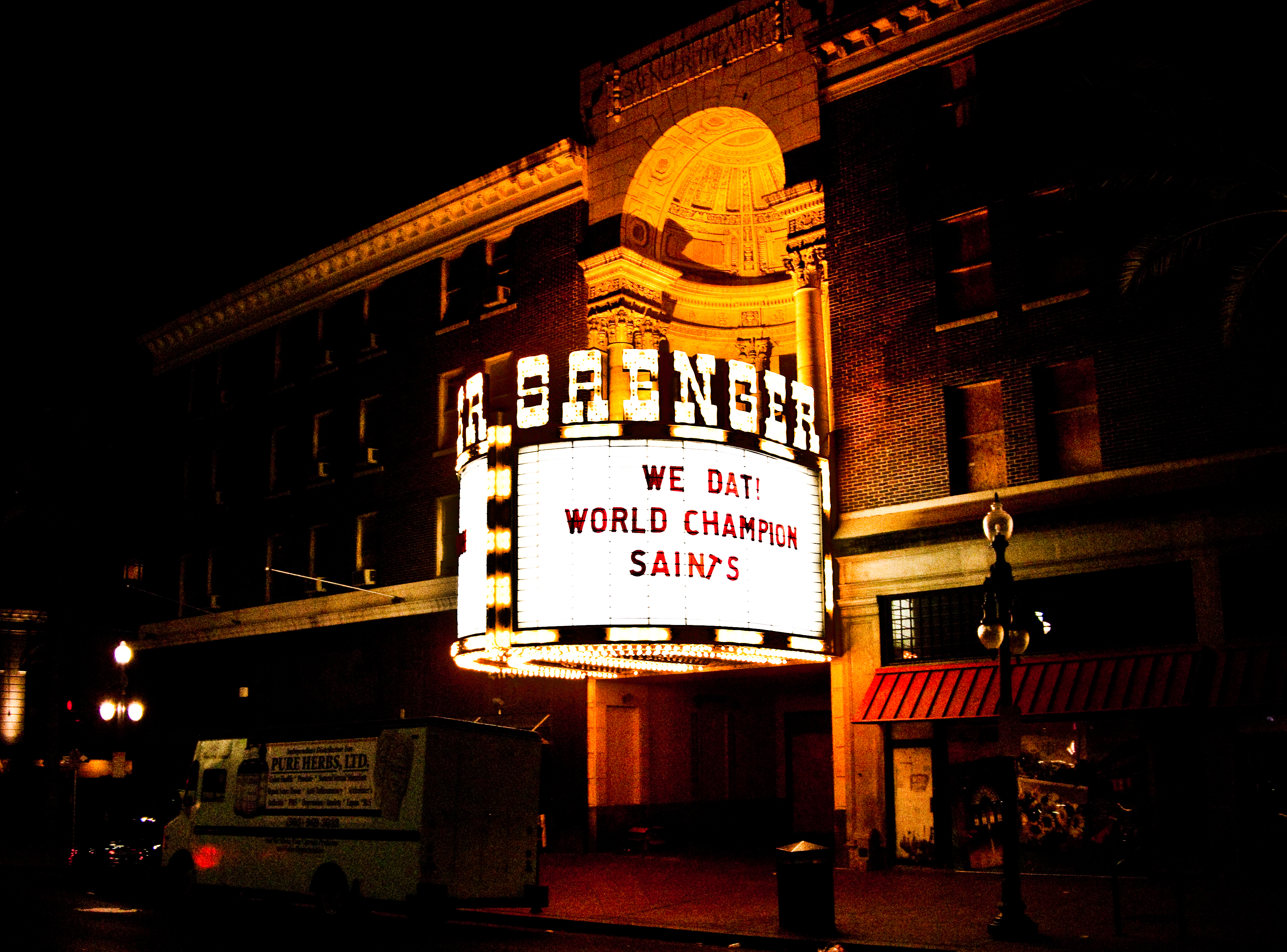
February 2010: Marquee celebrates the victorious New Orleans Saints

A main focus of the restoration is to return the Saenger to its original state. Work will include stripping paint to reveal the building's original color scheme, along with using historic photographs to match hardware such as doors, light fixtures, and windows as closely as possible. The escalator in the arcade will be removed, the main entrances will be recessed to reflect the original floor plan, and marquees matching the originals will be installed. Renovations will also include updates, such as incorporating the adjacent 1101 Canal Street building to use as a restaurant, restrooms, and box offices; expanding the stage by 40%; installing central air conditioning; and replacing the ceiling's trademark constellation with LED lights. All work, including modern updates, will adhere to strict preservation guidelines set by various entities including the National Park Service.

The marquee was ceremoniously re-lit in October 2009 to signify the Saenger Theatre's rebirth. An announcement was made that the marquee would be lit every night until the theatre reopened in the fall of 2011.

In the first months of 2010 restoration work was begun on the theater. In addition a website was launched and the Broadway tour producers Broadway Across America announced that The Lion King would play at the Saenger during the 2011–2012 season. The full schedule has yet to be released. NOLA.com announced that construction on the theatre would begin in July 2010.

Although the project was scheduled to begin in July 2010, by March 2011 construction had not yet started. At that time an announcement was made that the Saenger would not be ready until at least the 2012-2013 Broadway season.

In December 2011 New Orleans officials announced final financial hurdles had been cleared and construction began on the $51 million renovation in January 2012.

The Saenger Theatre reopened September 27, 2013 with three performances from comedian Jerry Seinfeld; one on September 27 and two on September 28. The opening gala would be held October 3–6. The National Trust for Historic Preservation cited the site as one of ten historic sites saved in 2013. The renovation had a final price tag of $53 million.

The roof of the Saenger Theater was damaged on October 12, 2019, after a structural collapse occurred on 1031 Canal St, causing a hole to be punctured on the roof of the building; this was later repaired.

== Organ ==
The Saenger Theatre features an approximately 2000-pipe theatre organ by Robert Morton, installed at the theater's opening. One of the largest instruments ever built by the Robert Morton Organ Company of Van Nuys, California, it was the prototype for the company's "Wonder Morton" line. The organ has a four manual console and 26 ranks of pipes. Nine ranks extend to the 16' pitch. It was designed specifically for the acoustics of the Saenger, and is one of the few Robert-Morton organs in the United States still in the location of its original installation. According to theater historian Ben M. Hall, the famed theater organist Jesse Crawford said the Saenger's Morton was the finest instrument he had ever played.

== See also ==
- List of concert halls
- List of music venues
- Theatre in Louisiana
- Saenger Theatre – some that survive
