= Livingstone Bramble =

Saint Kitts and Nevis boxer (1960–2025)

Ras-I Alujah Bramble
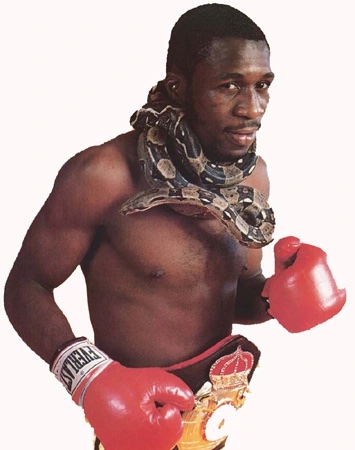
- Bramble c. 1984

Personal information
- Nickname: Pitbull
- Nationality: Saint Kitts and Nevis
- Born: Livingstone Bramble; September 3, 1960 Nevis, West Indies Federation
- Died: March 22, 2025 (aged 64)
- Height: 5 ft 8 in (173 cm)
- Weight: Lightweight; Light welterweight

Boxing career
- Reach: 74 in (188 cm)
- Stance: Orthodox

Boxing record
- Total fights: 69
- Wins: 40
- Win by KO: 25
- Losses: 26
- Draws: 3

Ras-I Alujah Bramble (born Livingstone Bramble; September 3, 1960 – March 22, 2025) was a professional boxer who was once the WBA Lightweight boxing champion of the world. Bramble was raised on Saint Croix, U.S. Virgin Islands. He became the first world champion from Saint Kitts and Nevis.

== Boxing career ==
Bramble began boxing professionally on October 16, 1980, knocking out Jesus Serrano in round one. He would outpoint Serrano in a rematch. In his fourth fight, Bramble faced the more experienced, fringe contender Jorge Nina, winning by a disqualification in the second round.

On June 4, 1981, Bramble beat Ken Bogner by a knockout in seven rounds. But later that year, on August 31, he lost for the first time, in an eight-round decision to Anthony Fletcher. After that loss, he built a streak of thirteen wins in a row, including wins over former world title challengers James Busceme and Gaetan Hart, as well as top ten ranked fighters like Jerome Artis and Rafael Williams.

Bramble was given a shot at a world title when the WBA pitted him and Ray "Boom Boom" Mancini for the Lightweight title on June 1, 1984. Bramble entered the ring sporting a record of 20 wins and only one loss, with thirteen knockouts, but was a heavy underdog to Mancini, who had recently gone fourteen rounds with the legendary Alexis Argüello, and he was also coming off a successful title defense on January 14, a third-round knockout of two time world champion Bobby Chacon. Furthermore, talks about a super-fight between Mancini and IBF world Jr. Welterweight champion Aaron Pryor were already under way. Nevertheless, Bramble cut Mancini in round one and went on to become the WBA world Lightweight champion by a fourteenth-round knockout in Buffalo, New York. After this, The Ring published a cover of Bramble, WBA Jr. Lightweight world champion Rocky Lockridge, and their trainer Lou Duva. The cover read: The championship season.

After defeating Edwin Curet by a ten-round decision in a non-title bout, Bramble met Mancini in a rematch on February 16, 1985. In what marked the debut of the Compubox scoring system, Bramble defeated Mancini by an extremely close but unanimous fifteen-round decision to retain his world title at Reno, Nevada, in front of an HBO Boxing audience.

After Héctor Camacho defeated José Luis Ramírez to claim the WBC title on August 10 of that year, there was widespread talk about a series of fights between Bramble, Camacho and IBF world Lightweight champion Jimmy Paul, to see who would become the unified world champion.

Exactly one year after defeating Mancini for the second time, Bramble defeated the WBA's number one challenger, Tyrone Crawley, by a knockout in round thirteen.

Bramble's next defense was supposed to be a preparation fight for him to meet Camacho. He and Camacho each defended their crowns on September 26, in what was nicknamed The Preamble to Bramble. However, in what many saw as a surprise, Bramble lost his title to former WBC lightweight champion Edwin Rosario, who knocked him out in two rounds at Miami.

After this loss, Bramble never regained his status as a top lightweight. He fought on, and met some future or former world champions such as Freddie Pendleton, Charles Murray, James "Buddy" McGirt, Roger Mayweather, Rafael Ruelas and Kostya Tszyu, as well as world title challengers like Wilfredo Rivera, Oba Carr and Darryl Tyson. However, he was on the losing end of most of these fights.

During the 1990s Bramble went through several name changes, often fighting under the names of Ras-I-Bramble or Abuja Bramble.

== Professional boxing record ==
69 fights	40 wins	26 losses
By knockout	25	5
By decision	13	20
By disqualification	2	1
Draws	3	

No.	Result	Record	Opponent	Type	Round, time	Date	Location	Notes
69	Loss	40–26–3	Armando Robles	UD	6 (6)	2003-06-27	Centro Civico Mexicano, Salt Lake City, Utah, U.S.	
68	Loss	40–25–3	Dumont Welliver	UD	6 (6)	2003-02-27	Coeur d'Alene Casino, Worley, Idaho, U.S.	
67	Loss	40–24–3	Jeffrey Resto	RTD	3 (8)	2002-07-26	Mountaineer Casino, Chester, West Virginia, U.S.	
66	Loss	40–23–3	Wayne Martell	UD	10 (10)	2002-06-16	Treasure Island Resort & Casino, Red Wing, Minnesota, U.S.	
65	Loss	40–22–3	Juan Carlos Rodríguez	UD	10 (10)	2002-03-29	The Orleans, Paradise, Nevada, U.S.	
64	Loss	40–21–3	Frank Houghtaling	SD	8 (8)	1999-11-19	Turning Stone Resort Casino, Verona, New York, U.S.	
63	Win	40–20–3	Benji Singleton	PTS	8 (8)	1999-10-02	Civic Center, Albany, Georgia, U.S.	
62	Win	39–20–3	Paul Nave	TKO	2 (10)	1999-05-21	Marin County Civic Center, San Rafael, California, U.S.	
61	Loss	38–20–3	Wilfredo Rivera	KO	3 (10)	1997-03-22	Condado, Puerto Rico	
60	Loss	38–19–3	Charles Murray	UD	10 (10)	1997-03-01	Convention Center, Atlantic City, New Jersey, U.S.	
59	Loss	38–18–3	Rafael Ruelas	UD	10 (10)	1996-08-23	Bally's Park Place, Atlantic City, New Jersey, U.S.	
58	Win	38–17–3	Tony Bennett	KO	1 (10)	1996-05-04	Bristol Sports Arena, Bristol, Tennessee, U.S.	
57	Loss	37–17–3	Shannan Taylor	KO	1 (10)	1995-11-27	Showgrounds, Toowoomba, Australia	
56	Loss	37–16–3	Søren Søndergaard	UD	10 (10)	1995-06-09	Forum Kolding, Kolding, Denmark	
55	Loss	37–15–3	Francisco Cuesta	UD	12 (12)	1995-04-30	Rio Casino, Paradise, Nevada, U.S.	For WBC Continental Americas light welterweight title
54	Loss	37–14–3	Louis Veader	UD	10 (10)	1994-10-26	Convention Center, Providence, Rhode Island, U.S.	
53	Win	37–13–3	Bernard Matthews	UD	10 (10)	1994-09-23	Hawthorne Race Course, Cicero, Illinois, U.S.	
52	Loss	36–13–3	Buddy McGirt	UD	12 (12)	1994-04-09	Scope Arena, Norfolk, Virginia, U.S.	
51	Win	36–12–3	Mike Johnson	UD	10 (10)	1994-01-16	Fernwood Resort, Bushkill, Pennsylvania, U.S.	
50	Win	35–12–3	Allen Osborne	TKO	5 (10)	1993-10-08	Days Inn, Allentown, Pennsylvania, U.S.	
49	Loss	34–12–3	Kostya Tszyu	UD	10 (10)	1993-08-23	Newcastle, Australia	
48	Draw	34–11–3	Darryl Tyson	SD	10 (10)	1993-07-02	Convention Center, Washington, D.C., U.S.	
47	Loss	34–11–2	Roger Mayweather	DQ	5 (10)	1993-03-14	Aladdin Hotel & Casino, Paradise, Nevada, U.S.	
46	Loss	34–10–2	Rodney Moore	UD	10 (10)	1993-01-26	The Blue Horizon, Philadelphia, Pennsylvania, U.S.	
45	Loss	34–9–2	Ricky Meyers	UD	10 (10)	1992-10-21	Trump Taj Mahal, Atlantic City, New Jersey, U.S.	
44	Win	34–8–2	Juan Lebron	TKO	3 (?)	1992-08-22	Saint Thomas, U.S. Virgin Islands	
43	Win	33–8–2	Anthony Stephens	SD	10 (10)	1992-05-15	Trump Taj Mahal, Atlantic City, New Jersey, U.S.	
42	Win	32–8–2	Derrick McGuire	TKO	5 (10)	1992-03-21	Cleveland State Convocation Center, Cleveland, Ohio, U.S.	
41	Loss	31–8–2	Charles Murray	UD	10 (10)	Dec 13, 1991	Convention Center, Atlantic City, New Jersey, U.S.	
40	Loss	31–7–2	Oba Carr	SD	10 (10)	1991-10-08	The Palace, Auburn Hills, Michigan, U.S.	
39	Loss	31–6–2	Carl Griffith	SD	10 (10)	1991-08-30	Marriott World Center, Orlando, Florida, U.S.	
38	Win	31–5–2	Roger Brown	KO	7 (10)	1991-06-14	Hyatt Regency, Tampa, Florida, U.S.	
37	Loss	30–5–2	Tony Martin	UD	10 (10)	1990-12-13	Penta Hotel, New York City, New York, U.S.	
36	Loss	30–4–2	Santos Cardona	MD	12 (12)	1990-02-18	Resorts Casino Hotel, Atlantic City, New Jersey, U.S.	Lost NABF light welterweight title
35	Win	30–3–2	Kenny Vice	DQ	6 (12)	1989-11-28	Alumni Arena, Buffalo, New York, U.S.	Retained NABF light welterweight title
34	Win	29–3–2	Harold Brazier	TKO	2 (12)	1989-08-08	Bally's Park Place, Atlantic City, New Jersey, U.S.	Won NABF light welterweight title
33	Win	28–3–2	Juan Minaya	TKO	2 (?)	1989-03-25	Saint Thomas, U.S. Virgin Islands	
32	Win	27–3–2	Bryant Paden	UD	10 (10)	1989-02-21	Resorts Casino Hotel, Atlantic City, New Jersey, U.S.	
31	Loss	26–3–2	Freddie Pendleton	TKO	10 (12)	1988-07-10	Sands Casino Hotel, Atlantic City, New Jersey, U.S.	For USBA lightweight titles
30	Win	26–2–2	Edwin Curet	TKO	8 (10)	1988-03-30	Resorts Casino Hotel, Atlantic City, New Jersey, U.S.	
29	Win	25–2–2	John Kalbhenn	TKO	5 (10)	1987-06-15	Convention Center, Atlantic City, New Jersey, U.S.	
28	Draw	24–2–2	Freddie Pendleton	MD	10 (10)	1987-04-03	Sands Casino Hotel, Atlantic City, New Jersey, U.S.	
27	Loss	24–2–1	Edwin Rosario	KO	2 (15)	1986-09-26	Abel Holtz Stadium, Miami Beach, Florida, U.S.	Lost WBA lightweight title
26	Win	24–1–1	Tyrone Crawley	TKO	13 (15)	1986-02-16	MGM Grand Goldwyn Ballroom, Reno, Nevada, U.S.	Retained WBA lightweight title
25	Win	23–1–1	Ray Mancini	UD	15 (15)	1985-02-16	Lawlor Events Center, Reno, Nevada, U.S.	Retained WBA lightweight title
24	Win	22–1–1	Edwin Curet	UD	10 (10)	1984-10-24	Harrah's, Atlantic City, New Jersey, U.S.	
23	Win	21–1–1	Ray Mancini	TKO	14 (15)	1984-06-01	Memorial Auditorium, Buffalo, New York, U.S.	Won WBA lightweight title
22	Win	20–1–1	Rafael Williams	UD	12 (12)	1984-01-22	Sands Casino Hotel, Atlantic City, New Jersey, U.S.	
21	Win	19–1–1	Lorenzo Guzman	KO	2 (10)	1983-12-14	Ice World, Totowa, New Jersey, U.S.	
20	Win	18–1–1	Tom Crowley	TKO	5 (10)	1983-11-23	Sands Casino Hotel, Atlantic City, New Jersey, U.S.	
19	Win	17–1–1	Juan Hernandez	TKO	5 (10)	1983-09-13	Playboy Hotel & Casino, Atlantic City, New Jersey, U.S.	
18	Win	16–1–1	Gaétan Hart	UD	10 (10)	1983-04-26	Tropicana Hotel & Casino, Atlantic City, New Jersey, U.S.	
17	Win	15–1–1	Teddy Hatfield	TKO	7 (10)	1983-02-23	Ice World, Totowa, New Jersey, U.S.	
16	Win	14–1–1	Romero Sandoval	TKO	9 (10)	1983-01-22	Sands Casino Hotel, Atlantic City, New Jersey, U.S.	
15	Win	13–1–1	James Busceme	MD	10 (10)	1982-10-17	Sands Casino Hotel, Atlantic City, New Jersey, U.S.	
14	Win	12–1–1	Miguel Meza	TKO	4 (10)	1982-08-22	Great Gorge Resort, McAfee, New Jersey, U.S.	
13	Win	11–1–1	Manuel Madera	TKO	4 (8)	1982-07-03	Ice World, Totowa, New Jersey, U.S.	
12	Win	10–1–1	Emilio Diaz	TKO	1 (10)	1982-04-19	Resorts Casino Hotel, Atlantic City, New Jersey, U.S.	
11	Win	9–1–1	Jerome Artis	UD	10 (10)	1982-01-17	Tropicana Hotel & Casino, Atlantic City, New Jersey, U.S.	
10	Win	8–1–1	Alejandro Arias	UD	8 (8)	1981-10-08	Ice World, Totowa, New Jersey, U.S.	
9	Loss	7–1–1	Anthony Fletcher	MD	8 (8)	1981-08-31	Sands Casino Hotel, Atlantic City, New Jersey, U.S.	
8	Win	7–0–1	Quadil Hart	TKO	1 (4)	1981-08-20	Ice World, Totowa, New Jersey, U.S.	
7	Win	6–0–1	Kenny Bogner	TKO	7 (8)	1981-06-04	Playboy Hotel & Casino, Atlantic City, New Jersey, U.S.	
6	Win	5–0–1	Johnny Bird	TKO	4 (4)	1981-05-21	Ice World, Totowa, New Jersey, U.S.	
5	Win	4–0–1	Andre Cain	TKO	2 (6)	1981-04-16	Ice World, Totowa, New Jersey, U.S.	
4	Win	3–0–1	Jorge Nina	DQ	2 (6)	1981-03-18	Ice World, Totowa, New Jersey, U.S.	
3	Win	2–0–1	Jesus Serrano	UD	6 (6)	1981-01-09	Caesars Hotel & Casino, Atlantic City, New Jersey, U.S.	
2	Draw	1–0–1	Bruce Williams	PTS	4 (4)	1980-12-04	Resorts Casino Hotel, Atlantic City, New Jersey, U.S.	
1	Win	1–0	Jesus Serrano	TKO	1 (4)	1980-10-16	Ice World, Totowa, New Jersey, U.S.	

== Personal life ==
When Bramble became a world champion, rumors of him practicing witchcraft became widespread. He did not deny these rumours. Bramble did enjoy walking around with his pet snake. He used to walk into the boxing ring with one on his neck, and he was pictured, again on the cover of Ring Magazine, with his snake. In 1985, Bramble stated that he hated chickens and he strangled them. It was also reported that Bramble had skinned a dead cat and put it on his living room wall. During this time he had a boa constrictor and a ferret named spider. He also had a dog named snake. He described himself as "the only Rasta prizefighter there is".

Bramble was a pescetarian and his diet was described as "primarily of fish, spaghetti, fungi, pumpkin and coconuts".

An avid marathon runner, Bramble competed each year at the International Boxing Hall of Fame's celebrity marathon. He was one of the most sought after autograph signers there every year. Bramble resided in Las Vegas. He is the subject of a full biography by boxing journalist Brian D'Ambrosio. The book is titled Rasta in the Ring: The Life of Rastafarian Boxer Livingstone Bramble and was published in 2016. The book dissects and explains the life and beliefs of the Rastafarian boxer.

=== Death ===
Bramble died on March 22, 2025, at the age of 64.

== See also ==
- List of world lightweight boxing champions

Sporting positions
Regional boxing titles
Preceded by Harold Brazier	NABF light welterweight champion August 8, 1989 – February 18, 1990	Succeeded by Santos Cardona
World boxing titles
Preceded by Ray Mancini	WBA lightweight champion June 1, 1984 – September 26, 1986	Succeeded by Edwin Rosario
