= Ubaldo Néstor Sacco =

Argentine boxer

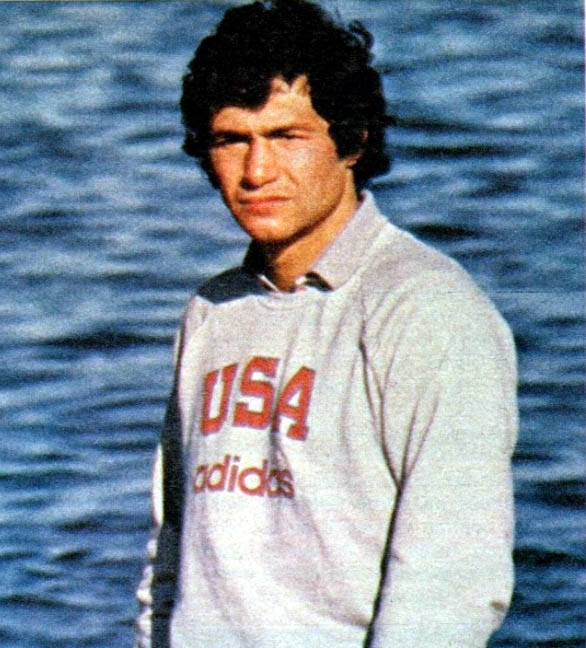
- Sacco in 1985

Personal information
- Nickname: Uby
- Born: 28 July 1955 Buenos Aires, Argentina
- Died: 28 May 1997 (aged 41) Mar del Plata, Argentina
- Height: 5 ft 7 1/2 in (171 cm)
- Weight: Light welterweight

Boxing career
- Reach: 68 in (173 cm)
- Stance: Orthodox

Boxing record
- Total fights: 52
- Wins: 47
- Win by KO: 23
- Losses: 4
- Draws: 1

Ubaldo Néstor Sacco (28 July 1955 – 28 May 1997) was an Argentine professional boxer who held the world junior welterweight title from 1985 to 1986.

== Professional career ==
Known as "Uby", Sacco turned pro in 1978 and won the World Boxing Association light welterweight title by TKO over Gene Hatcher in 1985. He lost the belt the following year to Patrizio Oliva by decision.

== Professional boxing record ==
52 fights	47 wins	4 losses
By knockout	23	0
By decision	24	4
Draws	1	

No.	Result	Record	Opponent	Type	Round, time	Date	Location	Notes
52	Loss	47–4–1	Patrizio Oliva	SD	15 (15)	1986-03-15	Stade Louis II, Fontvieille, Monaco	Lost WBA light welterweight title
51	Win	47–3–1	Gene Hatcher	TKO	9 (15)	1985-07-21	Casinò di Campione, Campione d'Italia, Italy	Won WBA light welterweight title
50	Loss	46–3–1	Gene Hatcher	SD	15 (15)	1984-12-15	Tarrant County Convention Center, Fort Worth, Texas, U.S.	For WBA light welterweight title
49	Win	46–2–1	Horacio Saldano	TKO	5 (10)	1983-10-08	Estadio Luna Park, Buenos Aires, Argentina	
48	Draw	45–2–1	Lorenzo Garcia	PTS	10 (10)	1983-07-23	Estadio Luna Park, Buenos Aires, Argentina	
47	Loss	45–2	Lorenzo Garcia	SD	10 (10)	1983-06-25	Estadio Luna Park, Buenos Aires, Argentina	
46	Win	45–1	Jose Maria Silva Rodriguez	TKO	1 (12)	1983-05-07	Estadio Luna Park, Buenos Aires, Argentina	Retained South American light welterweight title
45	Win	44–1	Willie Rodriguez	UD	10 (10)	1983-03-18	Convention Center, Atlantic City, New Jersey, U.S.	
44	Win	43–1	Juan Antonio Merlo	TKO	8 (10)	1983-02-18	Mar del Plata, Argentina	
43	Win	42–1	Hugo Sergio Quartapelle	PTS	10 (10)	1982-12-04	Estadio Luna Park, Buenos Aires, Argentina	
42	Win	41–1	Roberto Eduardo Alfaro	PTS	10 (10)	1982-11-06	Estadio Luna Park, Buenos Aires, Argentina	
41	Win	40–1	Simon Escobar	PTS	10 (10)	1982-10-22	Olavarria, Argentina	
40	Win	39–1	Jose Ignacio Funes	PTS	10 (10)	1982-09-24	Mar del Plata, Argentina	
39	Win	38–1	Roberto Eduardo Alfaro	PTS	12 (12)	1982-05-15	Estadio Luna Park, Buenos Aires, Argentina	Won South American light welterweight title
38	Win	37–1	Horacio Saldano	PTS	10 (10)	1982-04-03	Estadio Luna Park, Buenos Aires, Argentina	
37	Win	36–1	Pablo Alberto Ferreyra	TKO	9 (10)	1982-02-19	Mar del Plata, Argentina	
36	Win	35–1	Ramon Abeldano	TKO	10 (10)	1982-01-08	Mar del Plata, Argentina	
35	Win	34–1	Juan Orlando Barboza	PTS	10 (10)	1981-12-18	San Miguel, Argentina	
34	Win	33–1	Ruben Oscar Verdun	PTS	10 (10)	1981-11-28	Estadio Luna Park, Buenos Aires, Argentina	
33	Win	32–1	Hugo Alfredo Luero	PTS	12 (12)	1981-10-17	Estadio Luna Park, Buenos Aires, Argentina	Retained Argentine light welterweight title
32	Win	31–1	Federico Oscar Godoy	KO	2 (10)	1981-10-02	Posadas, Argentina	
31	Win	30–1	Ricardo Alvarenga	TKO	2 (10)	1981-08-28	San Miguel de Tucumán, Argentina	
30	Win	29–1	Luis Antonio Perez	TKO	10 (10)	1981-08-07	San Miguel, Argentina	
29	Win	28–1	Romulo Ibarra	PTS	10 (10)	1981-07-24	Mar del Plata, Argentina	
28	Win	27–1	Roberto Eduardo Alfaro	UD	12 (12)	1981-05-23	Estadio Luna Park, Buenos Aires, Argentina	Won Argentine light welterweight title
27	Win	26–1	Manuel Ramon Bustos	PTS	10 (10)	1981-04-18	Mar del Plata, Argentina	
26	Win	25–1	Hugo Alfredo Luero	PTS	10 (10)	1981-03-07	Estadio Luna Park, Buenos Aires, Argentina	
25	Win	24–1	Jose Maria Silva Rodriguez	KO	8 (10)	1981-01-23	Mar del Plata, Argentina	
24	Win	23–1	Felix Sune	PTS	10 (10)	1980-12-05	Mar del Plata, Argentina	
23	Win	22–1	Juan Domingo Saucedo	RTD	6 (10)	1980-11-14	San Miguel, Argentina	
22	Win	21–1	Joel Gomes	TKO	4 (10)	1980-10-17	Mar del Plata, Argentina	
21	Win	20–1	Hugo Alfredo Luero	KO	6 (10)	1980-09-13	Estadio Luna Park, Buenos Aires, Argentina	
20	Win	19–1	Raul Eduardo Fernandez	PTS	10 (10)	1980-08-09	Bolívar, Argentina	
19	Win	18–1	Roberto Iluffi	KO	7 (10)	1980-07-11	Mar del Plata, Argentina	
18	Win	17–1	Juan Domingo Saucedo	PTS	10 (10)	1980-05-17	Comodoro Rivadavia, Argentina	
17	Loss	16–1	Hugo Sergio Quartapelle	PTS	10 (10)	1980-04-05	Estadio Luna Park, Buenos Aires, Argentina	
16	Win	16–0	Ramon Angel Allende	KO	2 (10)	1980-03-22	Mar del Plata, Argentina	
15	Win	15–0	Carlos Sulquehilde	KO	2 (10)	1980-02-16	Pinamar, Argentina	
14	Win	14–0	Jose Carlos dos Santos	TKO	8 (10)	1979-12-14	Mar del Plata, Argentina	
13	Win	13–0	Abraham Valenzuela	PTS	10 (10)	1979-11-23	Mar del Plata, Argentina	
12	Win	12–0	Juan Manuel Zuniga	PTS	10 (10)	1979-07-21	Mar del Plata, Argentina	
11	Win	11–0	Cirilo Ruiz	PTS	10 (10)	1979-06-08	Mar del Plata, Argentina	
10	Win	10–0	Juan Ramon Olivera	PTS	10 (10)	1979-02-02	Mar del Plata, Argentina	
9	Win	9–0	Ramon Angel Allende	PTS	10 (10)	1978-12-08	Mar del Plata, Argentina	
8	Win	8–0	Roque Antonio Arevalo	PTS	10 (10)	1978-11-10	Mar del Plata, Argentina	
7	Win	7–0	Sergio Gustavo Loyola	PTS	10 (10)	1978-10-14	Mar del Plata, Argentina	
6	Win	6–0	Gregorio Crescencio Villavicencio	TKO	7 (8)	1978-09-16	Mar del Plata, Argentina	
5	Win	5–0	Valerio Ramon Benitez	TKO	6 (6)	1978-08-26	Mar del Plata, Argentina	
4	Win	4–0	Francisco Carlos Fernandez	TKO	1 (6)	1978-08-04	Mar del Plata, Argentina	
3	Win	3–0	Santos Aranda	RTD	1 (6)	1978-07-22	Mar del Plata, Argentina	
2	Win	2–0	Hector Hilario Hernandez	TKO	4 (6)	1978-05-27	Mar del Plata, Argentina	
1	Win	1–0	Luis Alberto Garay	TKO	5 (6)	1978-04-22	Mar del Plata, Argentina	

== Death ==
Sacco died in Mar del Plata, Argentina of meningitis in 1997.

== See also ==
- List of world light-welterweight boxing champions

Sporting positions
Regional boxing titles
Preceded by Roberto Eduardo Alfaro	Argentina Boxing Federation light welterweight Champion; 23 May 1981 – October 1983; Vacated	Vacant Title next held by Hugo Ariel Hernandez
Preceded by Roberto Eduardo Alfaro	South American light welterweight Champion; 15 May 1982 – October 1983; Vacated	Vacant Title next held by Eduardo Roberto Bénévent
World boxing titles
Preceded by Gene Hatcher	WBA light welterweight champion 21 July 1985 – 15 March 1986	Succeeded by Patrizio Oliva
