= Harold Brazier =

American boxer (born 1955)

Harold Leon Brazier (born October 22, 1955, in South Bend, Indiana) is an American former boxer.

Harold is the brother of fellow professional boxer Kevin Brazier.

Regional titles
Vacant Title last held by Ronnie Shields	NABF Light Welterweight Champion; October 31, 1986 – August 8, 1989	Succeeded by Livingstone Bramble
Vacant Title last held by Pedro Padilla Estrada	IBF Light Welterweight Champion; Inter-Continental title January 28, 1990 – April 9, 1992	Succeeded by Vince Phillips
Preceded by Kevin Pompey	USBA Welterweight Champion; January 23, 1994 – July 22, 1994	Succeeded by Anthony Stephens
