= Barry Mendelson =

American television producer

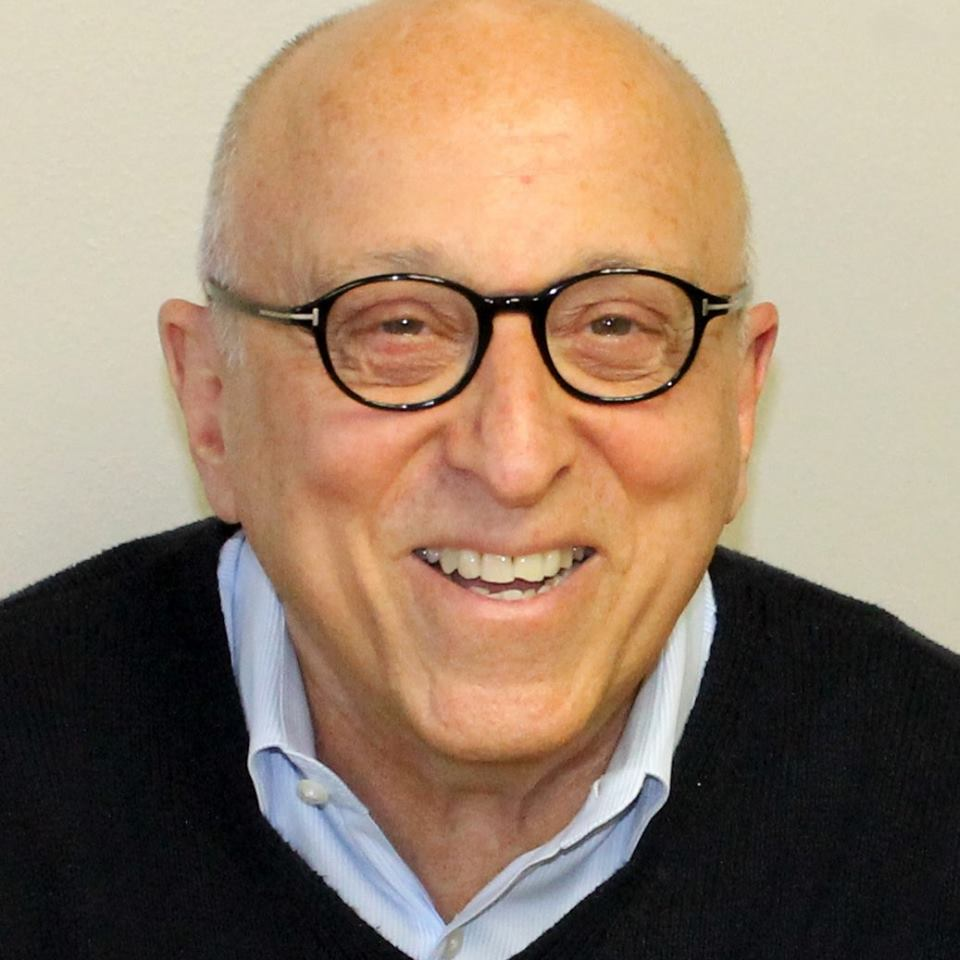

Barry Mendelson (born February 5, 1943) is an American television producer and CEO of Mendelson Entertainment Group LLC.

== Early life ==
Mendelson was born in Rochester, New York to Arthur and Eva Mendelson. He graduated from Penfield High School, in Rochester, New York, in 1961. He graduated from Ithaca College in 1965 with a Bachelor of Science in Communications. Mendelson went on to enter the United States Army in 1966, where he served as a Communications Specialist in the 3rd Armored Division, stationed in Frankfurt, Germany. He received an honorable discharge in 1968.

== Career ==
1968–1969 Color commentator for New York Giants Radio Network
1969–1970 Play-by-play radio announcer for New York Jets Radio Network

- Wrote the Pat Summerall Pro Football Radio Preview Show (1969–1970)
- Created and produced the Red Auerbach Radio Show (1969–1970)
- Created and produced the Whitey Ford Radio Show (1969–1970)

1969–1970 Play-by-play radio announcer for Army Football
1969–1970 Vice-President of the Boston Celtics Basketball Team (1969–1970)
1971–1972 Director of Radio, Television and Advertising at Los Angeles Forum Arena
1972–1973 Sports Director at KFI Radio, Los Angeles

- Sports talk with Jerry Bishop

1972–1974 Personal Manager for Jerry West of the Los Angeles Lakers
1974–1978 Vice-President of Business Operations (1974–1976) then General Manager (1976–1978) of the New Orleans Jazz Basketball Team
1978–1979 Founder and President of Cincinnati Kids Major League Indoor Soccer Team
1980–1984 President of Ticketmaster Associates
1979–1987 President of Barry Mendelson Presents
1979–1998 General Partner of Saenger Performing Arts Center and Owner of the historic landmark Saenger Theater in New Orleans
1988–1990 Executive Vice President of Madison Square Garden Enterprises
1994–2000 President of On Ice, Inc. These ice shows were performed in all 50 states, China, Russia, England, Australia, and New Zealand
2004–2006 President of TVSN Sports
2001 – current President of Mendelson Entertainment Group LLC

- The University of North Carolina vs The University of Texas basketball game at Cowboys Stadium (December 19, 2009; co-presenter with Dallas Cowboys; attendance 37,500)
- Star Wars in Concert at Cowboys Stadium (November 2009; co-presenter with the Dallas Cowboys; attendance 21,000)
- Children's Med Dallas, a 13-part series seen on WFAA, the ABC affiliate in Dallas/Fort Worth

== Notable achievements ==
As Executive Vice-President and General Manager of the New Orleans Jazz, was the first person in the NBA to sign a free agent, with compensation. (Gail Goodrich, 1975.) It is notable that this pick from the Jazz was used by the Lakers to sign Earvin Magic Johnson in 1979.

As Executive Vice-President and General Manager of the New Orleans Jazz, set the first attendance record of over 25,000 people to attend an NBA game. (November 5, 1975, 26,511 Jazz vs Lakers.)

Promoted largest indoor crowd worldwide to attend a concert. The Rolling Stones, December 3, 1981, Louisiana Superdome, 87,500 people.

As Executive Vice-President and General Manager of the New Orleans Jazz, hired the second African-American NBA Head Coach – Elgin Baylor.

He is member of the Ithaca College Athletic Hall of Fame

He established the Ann E. Mendelson and Barry Mendelson Endowed Scholarship at the Ithaca College School of Communications, and the Sandi and Barry Mendelson Sports Intern Scholarship at the Ithaca College School of Health Sciences and Human Performance

Member of the Louisiana Sports Hall of Fame Foundation
