= Tyrone Crawley =

American boxer (1958–2021)

Personal information
- Nickname: The Butterfly
- Nationality: United States
- Born: Tyrone Crawley; November 2, 1958 Philadelphia, Pennsylvania
- Died: January 15, 2021 (aged 62) Philadelphia, Pennsylvania
- Height: 5 ft 8 in (173 cm)
- Weight: Lightweight

Boxing career
- Stance: Southpaw

Boxing record
- Total fights: 24
- Wins: 22
- Win by KO: 7
- Losses: 2
- Draws: 0

Tyrone Crawley (November 2, 1958 – January 15, 2021) was a former professional boxer from Philadelphia, Pennsylvania.

== Career ==
During his professional boxing career he was known for his hand and foot speed, and the ability to switch effortlessly from the orthodox stance to the southpaw stance. Many opponents were confused by this style, and some boxing experts contend that Crawley might have been the best "switch hitter" of his time along with middleweight champion Marvelous Marvin Hagler.

As an amateur, Tyrone compiled a record of 56-6 (22 RSCs), and was a Golden Gloves champion and All Army champion in the late 1970s. Tyrone turned pro in October 1980 and won the ESPN lightweight title in only his ninth pro fight with a twelve-round decision over knockout puncher Al "Earthquake" Carter in September 1982. In his next fight, Crawley scored an impressive ten-round decision over future jr. welterweight champion Gene Hatcher on national television in October 1982. He defended his ESPN lightweight in December 1982 with a tenth round stoppage of Anthony Murray, but lost his ESPN title in a close 12-round decision to Melvin Paul in his next fight in February 1983. Crawley entered the Paul fight with a broken knuckle and broken finger.

Crawley rebounded in 1983 and scored a huge upset win over #1 lightweight contender Robin Blake in Blake's hometown of Levelland, Texas. Blake had knocked out Melvin Paul in his previous fight, and many expected him to dispose of Crawley easily. Blake was zeroing in on a title shot with Ray "Boom Boom" Mancini, but Blake had trouble solving Crawley's style, and was soundly beaten in a lopsided ten-round decision.

In 1984, Livingstone Bramble dethroned Ray Mancini to take the WBA lightweight title. Crawley was the #1 contender, and accepted $150,000 to step aside and allow Bramble and Mancini to engage in a rematch. Bramble defeated Mancini in their rematch on February 16, 1985.

Crawley won the USBA lightweight title in June 1985 with a twelve-round decision over crosstown rival and future IBF lightweight champion Charlie "Choo Choo" Brown. Crawley was supposed to challenge Bramble for the WBA lightweight crown on a few occasions in 1985, but the bout was postponed due to injuries to both fighters. Bramble and Crawley finally met for Bramble's title in February 1986 in Reno, Nevada. Crawley suffered the first knockdown of his career in the second round of that bout, but rallied over the next several rounds to draw even on the scorecards after eight rounds. Crawley eventually tired late in the fight, and was knocked out in the 13th round.

After the Bramble bout, Crawley joined the Philadelphia Police Department during the summer of 1986. He resumed his boxing career in June 1987 while maintaining his duties with the Philadelphia P.D. He scored three more wins, and retired from professional boxing in early 1988 with a record of 22-2 (7 KOs). In that same year, Tyrone was named Director of the North Philadelphia Police Athletic League, a position he held until his death.

Crawley attended Temple University. He was inducted into the New Jersey Boxing Hall of Fame in 2003. He was also inducted as a member of the 2010 class of the Pennsylvania Boxing Hall of Fame.

Tyrone had 3 children, Ageenah his eldest child, Tyrone Crawley Jr a current professional boxer, and Kevin Crawley an entertainment screenwriter.

Tyrone Crawley died on January 15, 2021, after an extended illness.
