= Kostya Tszyu vs. Julio César Chávez =

Professional boxing match

A Matter of Pride
- Date: July 29, 2000
- Venue: Arizona Veterans Memorial Coliseum, Phoenix, Arizona, U.S.
- Title on the line: WBC super lightweight title

Tale of the tape
Boxer	Kostya Tszyu	Julio César Chávez
Nickname	Thunder from Down Under	El Gran Campeón Mexicano ("The Great Mexican Champion")
Hometown	Serov, Ural, Russia	Ciudad Obregón, Sonora, Mexico
Purse	$1,200,000	$1,200,000
Pre-fight record	24–1 (1) (20 KO)	103–4–2 (84 KO)
Age	30 years, 10 months	38 years
Height	5 ft 7 in (170 cm)	5 ft 7 in (170 cm)
Weight	139 1/2 lb (63 kg)	140 lb (64 kg)
Style	Orthodox	Orthodox
Recognition	WBC; Super Lightweight Champion	WBC; No. 1 Ranked Super Lightweight; 3-division World Champion

Result
- Tszyu wins by 6th-round technical knockout

Kostya Tszyu vs. Julio César Chávez, billed as A Matter of Pride, was a professional boxing match contested on July 29, 2000, for the WBC super lightweight title.

== Background ==
In June 2000, it was announced that reigning WBC super lightweight champion would make the next defense of his title the following month in Phoenix, Arizona against former 2-time super lightweight champion Julio César Chávez. The announcement was met with controversy as it was felt that the soon-to-be-38-year old Chávez, who the WBC had ranked as their number-one super lightweight contender and, as such, Tszyu's mandatory challenger, was severely outmatched by Tszyu, who was 8 years younger and in the prime of his professional career. Jay Larkin, vice president of Showtime's sports programming and executive producer of Showtime Championship Boxing openly acknowledged that he was "not at all happy" about the fight being made and offered his opinion that he "did not think Chávez should be the No. 1 contender." Furthermore, then-Arizona senator John McCain, a noted detractor of combat sports, wrote a letter to Arizona governor Jane Dee Hull in which he called the fight "an illegitimate and potentially dangerous mismatch" in a failed attempt to have the fight cancelled.

In order to get approved for the fight, Chávez had to submit the results of a medical exam and plead his case in person to the Arizona Boxing Commission. After 90-minute hearing in which Chávez pleaded to the committee to let him "go out with dignity and honor", the commission granted him a boxing license to fight in the state, officially putting the fight on. Entering the fight, Chávez was such a heavy underdog that Las Vegas casinos refused to post odds for the fight.

== The Fight ==
After an uneventful start to the fight, Tszyu took control in fifth round. Chávez slipped and fell early in the round and after getting back up, was beaten badly by Tszyu who opened up a cut on Chávez's forehead after landing a five-punch combination. Tszyu carried the momentum into the sixth and sent Chávez down for only the second time in his career with a right hand. Though Chávez answered the referee's 10-count, he was soon pinned against the ropes and after Tszyu landed several blows to his head, the referee stopped the fight halfway point of the round, giving Tszyu the victory by technical knockout.

== Fight card ==
Confirmed bouts:

Weight Class	Weight		vs.		Method	Round	Notes
Super Lightweight	140 lbs.	Kostya Tszyu (c)	def.	Julio César Chávez	TKO	6/12	^{Note 1}
Super Lightweight	140 lbs.	Héctor Camacho Jr. (c)	def.	Phillip Holiday	TD-U	6/12	^{Note 2}
Welterweight	147 lbs.	Jose Luis Cruz	def.	Leonard Townsend	TKO	9/12	^{Note 3}
Cruiserweight	190 lbs.	Vassiliy Jirov	def.	Earl Butler	TKO	7/12
Lightweight	135 lbs.	Roberto Garcia	def.	Sandro Marcos	UD	8/8
Super Welterweight	154 lbs.	Ben Crampton	def.	Tony Martinez	SD	6/6
Heavyweight	200+ lbs.	Siarhei Liakhovich	def.	Anthony Curry	KO	1/6

^Note 1 For WBC Super Lightweight title
^Note 2 For NABA Super Lightweight title
^Note 3 For WBC Continental Americas Welterweight title

== Broadcasting ==
Country	Broadcaster
United States	Showtime

Preceded by vs. Ahmed Santos	Kostya Tszyu's bouts 29 July 2000	Succeeded by vs. Sharmba Mitchell
Preceded by vs. Buck Smith	Julio César Chávez's bouts 29 July 2000	Succeeded by vs. Terry Thomas
