= Floyd Mayweather Jr. vs. Sharmba Mitchell =

Boxing match

Pound for Pound King: Battle of Champions
- Date: November 19, 2005
- Venue: Rose Garden, Portland, Oregon, U.S.

Tale of the tape
Boxer	Floyd Mayweather Jr.	Sharmba Mitchell
Nickname	Pretty Boy	Little Big Man
Hometown	Grand Rapids, Michigan, U.S.	Washington, D.C., U.S.
Purse	$4,300,000	
Pre-fight record	34–0 (23 KO)	56–4 (30 KO)
Age	28 years, 8 months	35 years, 2 months
Height	5 ft 8 in (173 cm)	5 ft 7 in (170 cm)
Weight	147 lb (67 kg)	145 1/4 lb (66 kg)
Style	Orthodox	Southpaw
Recognition	WBC; Super Lightweight Champion; The Ring; No. 1 Ranked Light Welterweight; The Ring No. 1 ranked pound-for-pound fighter 3-division world champion	WBA; No. 6 Ranked Welterweight; Former WBA super lightweight champion

Result
- Mayweather wins via 6th-round technical knockout

Floyd Mayweather Jr. vs. Sharmba Mitchell, billed as Pound for Pound King: Battle of Champions, was a professional boxing match contested on November 19, 2005.

== Background ==
In his previous fight, Mayweather had defeated reigning WBC super lightweight champion Arturo Gatti in dominating fashion to capture his third world title in his third different weight class. Following his victory over Gatti, Mayweather engaged in negotiations with 2-time light middleweight champion Ronald "Winky" Wright that would see Mayweather jump up two weight classes and Wright, who was then fighting in the 160-pound middleweight division, drop back down to the 154-pound light middleweight division. However, the fight fell through when Wright insisted on an even 50–50 split of the fight's purse which Mayweather refused. Ricky Hatton, who held the IBF's version of the super lightweight title expressed interest in a unification bout with Mayweather, but his offer was declined and he instead pursued a unification with the WBA's super lightweight champion Carlos Maussa. In October 2005, it was announced that Mayweather would face former super lightweight champion Sharmba Mitchell on November 19 at the Rose Garden in Portland, Oregon. Initially, it was announced that Mayweather would be defending his newly won title against Mitchell, but the fight was later changed to a non-title bout that would see Mayweather make his welterweight debut. Mayweather, who in addition to Wright and Hatton was also in talks with Miguel Cotto, Zab Judah, Antonio Margarito and Shane Mosley, was criticized for choosing the now 35-year old Mitchell as an opponent being that Mitchell's career was on the decline and he had been dominated in his last major fight against Kostya Tszyu the previous year. Mayweather defended his choice of Mitchell stating that he felt Mitchell had "a lot left." Though Mayweather had previously vowed after his pay-per-view debut against Gatti that he would fight exclusively on pay-per-view going forward, his fight against Mitchell was aired on a standard episode of HBO World Championship Boxing. This would be Mayweather's final non-pay-per-view fight.

== The Fight ==
Mitchell was the more active fighter, throwing 274 punches compared to Mayweather's 231, but struggled to penetrate Mayweather's defence and landed just 31 punches through six rounds. Mayweather, meanwhile, landed 85 punches, all but 20 being classified as power punches. Mayweather sent Mitchell down to the canvas twice; first in the third round after Mayweather caught Mitchell with a short right hand just under a minute into the round, and the second in the sixth round when a body shot from Mayweather landed, forcing Mitchell to take a knee. Mitchell remained on his knee in pain while referee Richard Steele counted to 10 before getting back up at the count of nine, however, as Mitchell had been badly dominated up to that point, Steele decided to stop the fight. Mayweather, though initially declared the winner by a standard knockout, was officially named the winner by technical knockout at 2:06 of the round.

== Fight card ==
Confirmed bouts:

Weight Class	Weight		vs.		Method	Round	Notes
Welterweight	147 lbs.	Floyd Mayweather Jr.	def.	Sharmba Mitchell	TKO	6/12
Super Lightweight	140 lbs.	Steve Forbes	def.	Julio Sanchez Leon	KO	3/10
Lightweight	135 lbs.	Wes Ferguson	def.	Silverio Ortiz	UD	8/8
Middleweight	160 lbs.	Andre Ward	def.	Darnell Boone	UD	6/6

== Broadcasting ==
Country	Broadcaster
United States	HBO

Preceded by vs. Arturo Gatti	Floyd Mayweather Jr.'s bouts 19 November 2005	Succeeded by vs. Zab Judah
Preceded by vs. Chris Smith	Sharmba Mitchell's bouts 19 November 2005	Succeeded by vs. Jose Luis Cruz
