= Kostya Tszyu vs. Ricky Hatton =

Boxing competition

- Date: 4 June 2005
- Venue: Manchester Arena, Manchester, UK
- Title(s) on the line: IBF and The Ring junior welterweight titles

Tale of the tape
Boxer	Kostya Tszyu	Ricky Hatton
Nickname	Thunder From Down Under	The Hitman
Hometown	Serov, Ural, Russia	Stockport, Manchester, UK
Pre-fight record	31–1 (25 KO)	38–0 (28 KO)
Age	35 years, 8 months	26 years, 7 months
Height	5 ft 7 in (170 cm)	5 ft 6 in (168 cm)
Weight	140 lb (64 kg)	139 3/4 lb (63 kg)
Style	Orthodox	Orthodox
Recognition	IBF and The Ring; Junior Welterweight Champion; The Ring No. 3 ranked pound-for-pound fighter	IBF; No. 1 Ranked Junior Welterweight; WBA; No. 2 Ranked Junior Welterweight; WBU junior welterweight champion

Result
- Hatton wins via 11th-round RTD

Kostya Tszyu vs. Ricky Hatton, was a professional boxing match contested on 4 June 2005 for the IBF and The Ring junior welterweight championship. The 22,000 who attended the bout at the Manchester Arena witnessed one of the biggest upsets in British Boxing History.

== Build-up ==
Kostya Tszyu was an established force amongst the top pound-for-pound fighters in the world and had been the first man to unify the light welterweight division in 30 years. At 35 years old he had been the champion for more than a decade and was considered a national hero in Australia. His only other defeat was in 1997 to Vince Phillips and was named the Ring Magazine upset of the year.

Ricky Hatton at the time, held the minor WBU light welterweight belt, having knocked out Tony Pep and was coming into the fight off stoppage wins against Michael Stewart and Ray Oliveira. He was the underdog for the fight, known mostly in Britain as a young crowd favourite.

The fight was staged at 11pm local time to accommodate the American TV company Showtime and that it would on prime time in America. The referee was Dave Parris.

== The Fight ==
Tszyu was a notoriously slow starter and Hatton won the first two rounds in an aggressive start to the fight, however the champion qualities of Tszyu shone through in rounds 3–5 as he settled into a rhythm and was able to time his counter punches. The sportsmanship of both competitors was questionable at times throughout the middle phases of the fight; Tszyu knocking Hatton to the canvas in the closing stages of the seventh with what was found to be an illegal low blow, and Hatton responding with a deliberate low blow after Tszyu was warned again in the ninth. Nevertherless, Hatton's aggression and pace had begun to slow the aging champion, and going into the twelfth he had a slight lead on all three judges scorecards (105–104, 106–103 and 107–102). After a back and forth battle in which both fighters took great punishment, Tszyu failed to emerge from his corner for the final round as his trainer Johnny Lewis threw in the towel.

Despite parts of the fight being somewhat marred by illegal tactics from both sides, each fighter praised the other in post fight speeches; Hatton stating that he would be honoured to ever be a champion of the same ilk as Tszyu, and Tszyu humbly declaring that he was beaten by the better fighter. This performance is generally regarded as the peak in Hatton's career; due to the stamina and heart he displayed in the fight.

== Aftermath ==
The fight marked the end of Kostya Tszyu's career, as he retired shortly afterwards.

This fight formed one of two fights, the other being against Carlos Maussa that brought Hatton the award of 2005 Ring Magazine fighter of the year. Hatton went on to beat such names Juan Urango, José Luis Castillo and Paulie Malignaggi but his time as a top class boxer came to an end after he lost to both pound-for-pound kings Floyd Mayweather Jr., in December 2007, and against Manny Pacquiao in May 2009 via a 2nd round KO. In the latter years of Hatton's career his level of fitness became questionable after he developed a pattern of ballooning up in weight between fights.

In their March 2010 issue, Ring Magazine ranked Tszyu as the number one junior welterweight of the decade (2000's) ahead of Hatton who was listed at number two.

== Undercard ==
Confirmed bouts:

== Broadcasting ==
Country	Broadcaster
Australia	Fox Sports/Main Event
Hungary	Sport 1
Mexico	TV Azteca
United Kingdom	Sky Sports
United States	Showtime

Preceded by vs. Sharmba Mitchell II	Kostya Tszyu's bouts 4 June 2005	Retired
Preceded by vs. Ray Oliveira	Ricky Hatton's bouts 4 June 2005	Succeeded by vs. Carlos Maussa
