= Jean Mendy =

Jean Mendy may refer to:

- Jean Alassane Mendy, Senegalese footballer
- Jean Baptiste Mendy, Senegal-born French boxer
