= Kostya Tszyu vs. Sharmba Mitchell II =

Boxing match

Unfinished Business
- Date: November 6, 2004
- Venue: Glendale Arena, Glendale, Arizona, U.S.
- Title(s) on the line: IBF and The Ring junior welterweight titles

Tale of the tape
Boxer	Kostya Tszyu	Sharmba Mitchell
Nickname	Thunder From Down Under	Little Big Man
Hometown	Serov, Ural, Russia	Takoma Park, Maryland, U.S.
Pre-fight record	30–1 (24 KO)	55–3 (30 KO)
Age	35 years, 1 month	34 years, 2 months
Height	5 ft 7 in (170 cm)	5 ft 7 in (170 cm)
Weight	140 lb (64 kg)	140 lb (64 kg)
Style	Orthodox	Southpaw
Recognition	IBF and The Ring; Junior Welterweight Champion; The Ring No. 8 ranked pound-for-pound fighter	IBF; Interim Junior Welterweight Champion; The Ring; No. 1 Ranked Light Welterweight

Result
- Tszyu defeated Mitchell by 3rd round TKO

Kostya Tszyu vs. Sharmba Mitchell II, billed as Unfinished Business, was a professional boxing match which took place on November 6, 2004 at the Glendale Arena, Glendale, Arizona.

== Background ==
Tszyu and Mitchell met for the first time on November 2, 2002, with Tszyu as the WBC world champion and Mitchell as the WBA world champion. They fought to unify those belts. The first fight was held in Las Vegas, Nevada. The fight was fought at close quarters with use of rough tactics by both boxers. Tszyu pushed Mitchell to the canvas four times. Whether the pushes were accidental or not was never known, but Mitchell injured his knee and declared himself unable to fight on after the seventh round, giving Tszyu an unlikely type of knockout.

One of the reasons that both Tszyu and Mitchell felt a rematch, apart from the fact that Mitchell claimed for three years after their first encounter that he was on his way to a win, was necessary was that most boxing magazine writers and fans alike felt that the first fight's result was inconclusive. Likewise, fans were split as to whom was winning the first fight between the co-champions: while Tszyu fans generally had him ahead, Mitchell fans felt Mitchell was winning it until the point when he could go on no longer.

Tszyu defeated Ben Tackie next, in February 2003, by a twelve-round unanimous decision, to retain the unified belts. During February 10, 2003, the managing team of Canadian boxer Arturo Gatti announced they had begun negotiations for a Tszyu-Gatti match-up (that fight failed to materialize).

Initially to be fought in late 2003 in Sydney, Australia, the Tszyu-Mitchell rematch had to be postponed because Tszyu injured two tendons during training.

It was then rescheduled for the summer of 2004, in Moscow, Russia however Tszyu got injured again, forcing a second postponement. These two injuries caused Tszyu to be inactive for a total of twenty-two months. In addition, the fact that Mitchell's knee had also naturally become weaker after his own injury made many fans question the ability of both fighters to put on a good show in their rematch.

The IBF named Mitchell their "interim champion". After further negotiations, it was agreed the fight should be held in Glendale, Arizona. The fight's referee was Raul Caiz, Sr..

=== Celebrities ===
Sylvester Stallone attended the fight, as well as former world Heavyweight champion Mike Tyson and Jr. Welterweight contender and interim WBA Jr. Welterweight champion Vivian Harris.

=== Flag incidents ===
Just before the boxers entered the ring for the main event, two fans brought out two Russian flags. They lit one, burning it. A second one would have been burned; security promptly arrived and removed the fans from the arena, but not before they threw the second flag for other fans to get it. These other fans proceeded to stomp on the flag. The reasons for protesting using a Russian flag during the Tszyu fight are not totally clear: though Tszyu is Russian by birth, he had long since renounced his Russian citizenship; Australia was Tszyu's new homeland.

== The fight ==
Both fighters rushed out of their corners for round one. Tszyu was somewhat slower; he might have been trying to shake off some rust after not fighting for the aforementioned twenty-two months. Mitchell landed some heavy rights to Tszyu's chin, while the champion looked calm and composed. Mitchell outlanded Tszyu in this round. An important point of the fight was when both boxers clashed their heads before round one was finished, and Tszyu came out with a cut around his nose.

Perhaps afraid that the fight would be stopped because of the cut and declared a technical draw, Tszyu came out of his corner for round two with a sense of urgency. Midway towards the round, he landed a right to Mitchell's chin that staggered the former world champion. Mitchell then retreated to the ropes, near his own corner. Tszyu followed with a flurry of punches, and Mitchell fell from an uppercut. He fell near the ropes, almost the same way that Sugar Ray Leonard had dropped Thomas Hearns in round thirteen of their 1981 fight.

Mitchell, visibly awakened, got up and continued fighting. Towards the end of the round, he landed a right to Tszyu's chin that made Tszyu's head snap back.

Soon after round three began, Tszyu connected with a right hand to the chin that sent Mitchell to the canvas for the second time; he landed on a sitting position. Mitchell again rose, but Tszyu stayed over him, driving him to the ropes and landing blows to Mitchell's body before Mitchell suffered his second knockdown of the round and third of the fight.

Once again, Mitchell rose, but he was trapped against the ropes. After another quick combination of blows to the body, Mitchell fell again, and referee Cadiz, Sr. proceeded to stop the fight. This was the fourth and final knockdown in the fight for Mitchell, as well as the third knockdown in round three.

== Aftermath ==
This turned out to be the last win in Tszyu's illustrious career.

== Undercard ==
The fight's undercard featured former world champions Yori Boy Campas and Joan Guzmán.

Confirmed bouts:

== Broadcasting ==
The bout was televised in the United States by Showtime, while, in Australia and Europe, it was shown on Pay Per View.

Country	Broadcaster
Australia	Main Event
United States	Showtime

Preceded by vs. Jesse James Leija	Kostya Tszyu's bouts 6 November 2004	Succeeded by vs. Ricky Hatton
Preceded by vs. Moises Pedroza	Sharmba Mitchell's bouts 6 November 2004	Succeeded by vs. Chris Smith
