= Stevie Johnston =

American boxer (born 1972)

Personal information
- Nickname: Lil' But Bad
- Nationality: American
- Born: Steven Earl Johnston; September 28, 1972 (age 53) Denver, Colorado, U.S.
- Height: 5 ft 4 1/2 in (164 cm)
- Weight: Lightweight; Light welterweight

Boxing career
- Reach: 68 1/2 in (174 cm)
- Stance: Southpaw

Boxing record
- Total fights: 49
- Wins: 42
- Win by KO: 18
- Losses: 6
- Draws: 1
Medal record
Men's Boxing
Representing United States
Junior World Boxing Championships
Silver medal – second place	Lima 1990	Light welterweight
Pan American Games
Gold medal – first place	Havana 1991	Light welterweight

Steven Earl Johnston (born September 28, 1972), best known as Stevie Johnston, is a former American professional boxer and a two-time former WBC lightweight champion.

== Amateur career ==
Johnston had a storied amateur career, compiling an amateur record of 260–13. Some of his highlights include:

- 1989 lost at Lightweight in the United States Championships to Shane Mosley
- 1990 United States Amateur champion at Light Welterweight
- 1990 2nd place at Light Welterweight at the World Championships in Lima, Peru; losing to Hector Vinent of Cuba.
- 1991 Silver medalist at the USA Sports festival beating Shane Mosley by decision, and losing to Terron Millett by decision
- 1991 Light Welterweight Gold Medalist at the Pan-American Games in Havana, Cuba. Results were:
  - Mark Leduc (Canada) won on points
  - Luiz da Silva (Brazil) won by forfeit
  - Edgar Ruiz (Mexico) won on points
- 1992 2nd place at Light Welterweight at United States Amateur Championships, losing to Shane Mosley.
- 1992 finished 2nd at the Olympic Trials in Worcester, MA, attempting to qualify as a Light Welterweight. Results were:
  - Mark Lewis won on points
  - Terron Millett won on points
  - Vernon Forrest lost on points, Johnston then lost again to Forrest in the Box-Offs in Phoenix.

== Professional career ==
Known as "Lil' But Bad", Johnston turned pro in 1993 and fought for the WBC Lightweight Title against Jean Baptiste Mendy in 1997, winning a close split decision. Johnston defended the title three times before losing the belt to Cesar Bazan in 1998 in a close decision. In 1999 he won a rematch against Bazan in another close decision. He defended the title four times, including a victory over Angel Manfredy, but lost the belt in a loss to José Luis Castillo in 2000 via majority decision. The loss was declared the 2000 Upset of the Year by Ring Magazine, as Castillo was relatively unknown at the time and Johnston was thought to be over the hill. It wasn't until a couple years later that the world would know how good of a fighter Castillo was. Later that year, in an attempt to regain the belt, Johnston rematched Castillo. In a bizarre ending, Johnston was originally declared the winner by Majority decision. Several minutes later it was discovered that Judge Ken Morita's scorecard (originally 115-114 Johnston) had been added incorrectly and should have read 114-114, thus making the bout a draw and allowing Castillo to retain his title. This was to be Johnston's last shot at a major title.

He lost his next big fight, a WBC Lightweight Title Eliminator in 2003 to contender Juan Lazcano, a stunning 11th-round TKO loss. Prior to the loss, the durable Johnston had never been stopped. After the loss, Johnston was inactive for more than two years due to injuries suffered in a car accident later that year. "I'm lucky to be alive, never mind fighting," Stevie explained. "I went through the windshield, woke up in the hospital, and ended-up with more than 100-stitches in my face." Johnston came back in 2005 and in 2006 took on former 140 lbs WBA world title holder Vivian Harris and was dominated. Johnston was down twice in the 1st round and once in rounds 4 and 7, losing in a 7th-round TKO. In 2007 he was stopped by Rolando Reyes.

In 2008, Johnston suffered another defeat by way of KO at the hands of a taller and younger Edner Cherry. A left jab followed immediately by a right cross which landed squarely on Johnston's chin and knocked him down with only 30 seconds left in the 10th and final round. Making matters worse, Johnston slammed the back of his head against the canvas on the way down, and was unconscious for several minutes after the count.

== Professional boxing record ==
49 fights	42 wins	6 losses
By knockout	18	4
By decision	24	2
Draws	1	

No.	Result	Record	Opponent	Type	Round	Date	Location	Notes
49	Loss	42–6–1	Edner Cherry	KO	10 (10)	May 21, 2008	The Field House, Camp Lejuene, North Carolina, U.S.	
48	Win	42–5–1	Dairo Esalas	RTD	10	Mar 29, 2008	Soaring Eagle Casino, Mount Pleasant, Michigan, U.S.	
47	Loss	41–5–1	Rolando Reyes	RTD	10 (12)	Oct 12, 2007	Coeur d'Alene Casino, Worley, Idaho, U.S.	Lost IBA lightweight title
46	Win	41–4–1	Humberto Toledo	UD	12	May 18, 2007	Broomfield Event Center, Broomfield, Colorado, U.S.	Retained IBA lightweight title
45	Win	40–4–1	Tyron Harris	MD	12	Jan 26, 2007	Destiny's, Orlando, Florida, U.S.	Won vacant IBA lightweight title
44	Loss	39–4–1	Vivian Harris	TKO	7 (10)	Jul 29, 2006	Chumash Casino Resort, Santa Ynez, California, U.S.	
43	Win	39–3–1	Roberto Ortega	TKO	5 (8)	Mar 31, 2006	Multi Fight Complex, Tampa, Florida, U.S.	
42	Win	38–3–1	Steve Quinonez	UD	12	Jan 27, 2006	Tropicana Hotel & Casino, Atlantic City, New Jersey, U.S.	Won vacant IBO light welterweight title
41	Win	37–3–1	Volodymyr Khodakovskyy	UD	10	Dec 3, 2005	Municipal Coliseum, Saint Petersburg, Florida, U.S.	Won vacant NABC light welterweight title
40	Win	36–3–1	James Crayton	UD	8	Oct 15, 2005	UCF Arena, Kissimmee, Florida, U.S.	
39	Loss	35–3–1	Juan Lazcano	TKO	11 (12)	Sep 13, 2003	MGM Grand Garden Arena, Las Vegas, Nevada, U.S.	
38	Win	35–2–1	Ever Beleno	KO	6 (12)	Feb 21, 2003	Palace Indian Gaming Center, Lemoore, California, U.S.	
37	Win	34–2–1	Alejandro González	MD	12	Apr 20, 2002	MGM Grand Garden Arena, Las Vegas, Nevada, U.S.	
36	Win	33–2–1	Bradley Jensen	TKO	6 (10)	Sep 23, 2001	Riviera Casino, Black Hawk, Colorado, U.S.	
35	Win	32–2–1	James Crayton	TD	9 (10)	Jun 1, 2001	Orleans Hotel & Casino, Las Vegas, Nevada, U.S.	
34	Win	31–2–1	Pedro Garcia	UD	8	May 18, 2001	The Hangar, West Wendover, Utah, U.S.	
33	Draw	30–2–1	José Luis Castillo	MD	12	Sep 15, 2000	Pepsi Center, Denver, Colorado, U.S.	For WBC lightweight title
32	Loss	30–2	José Luis Castillo	MD	12	Jun 17, 2000	The Bicycle Hotel & Casino, Bell Gardens, California, U.S.	Lost WBC lightweight title
31	Win	30–1	Julio Alvarez	TKO	2 (12)	Mar 17, 2000	Magness Arena, Denver, Colorado, U.S.	Retained WBC lightweight title
30	Win	29–1	Billy Schwer	UD	12	Nov 29, 1999	Wembley Arena, Wembley, London, England	Retained WBC lightweight title
29	Win	28–1	Angel Manfredy	UD	12	Aug 14, 1999	Foxwoods Resort Casino, Ledyard, Connecticut, U.S.	Retained WBC lightweight title
28	Win	27–1	Aldo Nazareno Rios	UD	12	Jun 26, 1999	Mandalay Bay Resort & Casino, Las Vegas, Nevada, U.S.	Retained WBC lightweight title
27	Win	26–1	César Bazán	SD	12	Feb 27, 1999	Miccosukee Resort & Gaming, Miami, Florida, U.S.	Won WBC lightweight title
26	Win	25–1	Demetrio Ceballos	TKO	6 (10)	Nov 20, 1998	Orleans Hotel & Casino, Paradise, Nevada, U.S.	
25	Loss	24–1	César Bazán	SD	12	Jun 13, 1998	Sun Bowl, El Paso, Texas, U.S.	Lost WBC lightweight title
24	Win	24–0	George Scott	UD	12	Feb 28, 1998	Ballys Park Place Hotel Casino, Atlantic City, New Jersey, U.S.	Retained WBC lightweight title
23	Win	23–0	Saul Duran	UD	12	Sep 12, 1997	Caesars Palace, Paradise, Nevada, U.S.	Retained WBC lightweight title
22	Win	22–0	Hiroyuki Sakamoto	SD	12	Jul 26, 1997	Arena, Yokohama, Kanagawa, Japan	Retained WBC lightweight title
21	Win	21–0	Jean Baptiste Mendy	SD	12	Mar 1, 1997	Halle Georges Carpentier, Paris, France	Won WBC lightweight title
20	Win	20–0	Jose Luis Baltazar	UD	10	Jan 18, 1997	Thomas & Mack Center, Paradise, Nevada, U.S.	
19	Win	19–0	Julian Romero	TKO	2 (10)	May 31, 1996	Blaisdell Center Arena, Honolulu, Hawaii, U.S.	
18	Win	18–0	Mark Fernandez	UD	12	Feb 18, 1996	Adam's Mark Hotel, Denver, Colorado, U.S.	Retained NABF lightweight title
17	Win	17–0	Jesus Rodriguez	TKO	10 (12)	Dec 1, 1995	Fantasy Springs Resort Casino, Indio, California, U.S.	Retained NABF lightweight title
16	Win	16–0	Paquito Openo	KO	7 (12)	Aug 18, 1995	Ritz Carlton, Rancho Mirage, California, U.S.	Retained NABF lightweight title
15	Win	15–0	Howard Grant	TKO	9 (12)	May 2, 1995	Arizona Charlie's, Las Vegas, Nevada, U.S.	Won vacant NABF lightweight title
14	Win	14–0	Corey Johnson	KO	8 (10)	Mar 21, 1995	Arizona Charlie's, Las Vegas, Nevada, U.S.	
13	Win	13–0	Fred Valera	PTS	10	Dec 16, 1994	Mountaineer Casino Racetrack and Resort, Chester, West Virginia, U.S.	
12	Win	12–0	Sharmba Mitchell	TKO	9 (10)	Jun 21, 1994	MGM Grand Garden Arena, Las Vegas, Nevada, U.S.	
11	Win	11–0	Raymond Flores	PTS	10	May 27, 1994	Denver, Colorado, U.S.	
10	Win	10–0	John Jeter	PTS	6	Apr 23, 1994	Bristol, Tennessee, U.S.	
9	Win	9–0	Merle Muniz	TKO	2 (?)	Apr 15, 1994	Denver, Colorado, U.S.	
8	Win	8–0	Enrique Ursua	TKO	4 (6)	Mar 30, 1994	Denver, Colorado, U.S.	
7	Win	7–0	John Bryant	PTS	6	Feb 15, 1994	Denver, Colorado, U.S.	
6	Win	6–0	Chris Wall	TKO	2 (?)	Jan 15, 1994	Bristol, Tennessee, U.S.	
5	Win	5–0	James Page	MD	8	Oct 22, 1993	Civic Auditorium, Santa Cruz, California, U.S.	
4	Win	4–0	Jay Strickland	KO	1 (?)	Jul 2, 1993	Denver, Colorado, U.S.	
3	Win	3–0	Nasredin Bilam	KO	2 (6)	May 4, 1993	McNichols Sports Arena, Denver, Colorado, U.S.	
2	Win	2–0	Scott Williams	KO	1 (?)	Apr 17, 1993	Denver, Colorado, U.S.	
1	Win	1–0	Frank Cordova	TKO	3 (4)	Feb 16, 1993	McNichols Sports Arena, Denver, Colorado, U.S.	

== See also ==
- List of world lightweight boxing champions
- List of southpaw stance boxers

Sporting positions
Amateur boxing titles
Previous: Ray Lovato	U.S. light welterweight champion 1990	Next: Vernon Forrest
Regional boxing titles
Preceded by Leavander Johnson	NABF lightweight champion May 2, 1995 – 1996; Vacated	Vacant Title next held by Jesse James Leija
Minor World boxing titles
Vacant Title last held by Colin Lynes	IBO super lightweight champion January 27, 2006 – 2006; Vacated	Vacant Title next held by Ricky Hatton
Vacant Title last held by David Díaz	IBA lightweight champion January 26, 2007 – October 12, 2007	Succeeded by Rolando Reyes
Major World boxing titles
Preceded by Jean Baptiste Mendy	WBC lightweight champion March 1, 1997 – June 13, 1998	Succeeded by César Bazán
Preceded by César Bazán	WBC lightweight champion February 27, 1999 – June 17, 2000	Succeeded by José Luis Castillo
