= Braydon Smith =

Australian boxer

Braydon "Brayd" Smith (22 April 1991 – 16 March 2015) was an Australian featherweight boxing prospect who died two days after his final bout. Smith, also known by his nickname 'The Great White' and 'Brayd', was in his final year of law school before his death. He was born in Toowoomba, Australia and trained and managed by his father Brendon Smith.

== Professional boxing career ==
Smith turned professional on 13 March 2011, with a first round stoppage of eight-bout veteran David Smith at the Gold Coast Convention Centre in Queensland, Australia. Smith followed up his pro debut with eleven consecutive wins, including garnering the vacant World Boxing Council (WBC) Youth Silver Featherweight title in October 2013 in Toowoomba, and defending this title in July 2014 in Toowoomba. Smith's first 10 wins were in Australia. His eleventh professional bout was fought in Royal Square, Bangkok, Thailand, a third round stoppage of Anshon Pitulay of Indonesia, which brought Smith's record to 12-0.

== Final bout and death ==
John Vincent Moralde, a 12-0 super bantamweight boxer from Davao City, Philippines, went up in weight and won the battle of unbeaten fighters by winning a 10-round unanimous points decision over Smith for the vacant World Boxing Council Asian Boxing Council Continental Featherweight title in Toowoomba, Australia, on 14 March 2015. Scoring was 99-91, 98-92, 97-93 for Moralde. After congratulating Moralde in the ring, Smith returned to his dressing room, and subsequently traveled to Toowoomba Hospital where he collapsed into unconsciousness 90 minutes after the bout ended. After being airlifted to Princess Alexandra Hospital in Brisbane, Australia, where he spent two days in a medically induced coma on life support, Smith died on 16 March 2015 at the age of 23. He donated his organs to save the lives of others. Australian Medical Association Queensland President Shaun Rudd stated that the fighter's death showed why boxing should be banned in Australia. Smith's final professional boxing record was 12 wins and one defeat, with 10 knockouts.

== Professional boxing record ==
12 Wins (10 Knockouts), 1 Loss, 0 Draws
Res.	Record	Opponent	Type	Round	Date	Location	Notes
Loss	12-1	(Philippines) John Vincent Moralde	UD	10	2015-03-14	Rumours International, Australia	

== See also ==
- Leavander Johnson, 35-year-old lightweight boxer, died of subdural hematoma 5 days after match
