= Serow (disambiguation) =

Serow may refer to:

- Three species of Asian ungulate in the genus Capricornis
  - Japanese serow
  - Mainland serow
  - Taiwan serow
- Serow, Iran, a city in Urmia County, West Azarbaijan Province, Iran
- The Yamaha XT225 Serow motorcycle
- Alternative spelling of Serov
