= Kostya Tszyu =

Russian-Australian boxer (born 1969)

Kostya Tszyu Костя Цзю
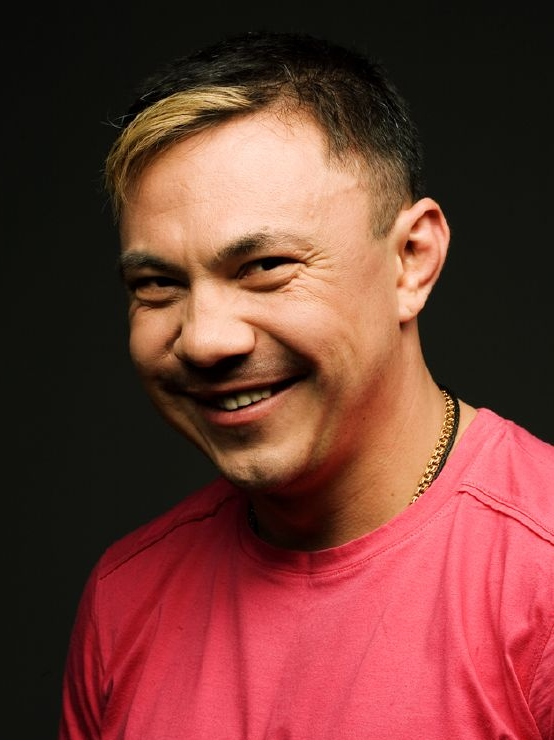
- Tszyu in 2008

Personal information
- Nickname: Thunder from Down Under
- Nationality: Australian (since 1993); Soviet (until 1991)
- Born: Konstantin Borisovich Tszyu; 19 September 1969 (age 56) Serov, Russian SFSR, Soviet Union
- Height: 5 ft 7 in (170 cm)
- Weight: Light-welterweight

Boxing career
- Reach: 67 in (170 cm)
- Stance: Orthodox

Boxing record
- Total fights: 34
- Wins: 31
- Win by KO: 25
- Losses: 2
- No contests: 1
Medal record
Men's amateur boxing
Representing Soviet Union
Goodwill Games
Gold medal – first place	1990 Seattle	Light-welterweight
World Championships
Bronze medal – third place	1989 Moscow	Lightweight
Gold medal – first place	1991 Sydney	Light-welterweight
Junior World Championships
Silver medal – second place	1987 Havana	Lightweight
European Championships
Gold medal – first place	1989 Athens	Lightweight
Gold medal – first place	1991 Gothenburg	Light-welterweight

Konstantin Borisovich "Kostya" Tszyu (/ˈkɒstə ˈzuː/ KOS-tə ZOO; Russian: Константин Борисович «Костя» Цзю, IPA: [kənstɐnʲˈtʲin bɐˈrisəvʲɪtɕ ˈkosʲtʲə ˈdzːʲu]; born 19 September 1969) is a Russian-Australian former professional boxer who competed from 1992 to 2005. He held multiple world championships in the light-welterweight division, including the undisputed (Note: Three-belt era: World Boxing Association (WBA) (Super version), World Boxing Council (WBC), and International Boxing Federation (IBF) titles.) and lineal championships between 2001 and 2005. Tszyu was an exceptional all-around boxer-puncher who relied heavily on accuracy, timing, and carried formidable punching power; he is often regarded as one of the hardest-punching light-welterweights in the division's history, and one of the greatest light-welterweights of all time.

As an amateur, Tszyu represented the Soviet Union, winning a bronze medal in the lightweight division at the 1989 World Championships, and gold in the light-welterweight division at the 1991 World Championships. He also won consecutive gold medals at the 1989 and 1991 European Championships.

In 1995, Tszyu won his first of many professional world championships at light-welterweight—the International Boxing Federation (IBF) title—by defeating Jake Rodríguez. Five successful defences were made until an upset loss to Vince Phillips in 1997, which was Tszyu's first professional defeat. He would spend the next eight years undefeated, winning the vacant World Boxing Council (WBC) title in 1999 and the World Boxing Association (WBA) (Super version) title in 2001. Tszyu scored arguably his most famous win that year, when he knocked out Zab Judah to reclaim the IBF title, as well as the vacant Ring magazine and lineal titles, thus becoming the first undisputed light-welterweight champion in over 30 years. In 2005, in what would be his final fight, Tszyu was stopped by Ricky Hatton.

Tszyu is considered by many in Australia to be a national sports hero. In The Ring's March 2010 issue, Tszyu was ranked as the number one light-welterweight of the 2000s decade. In December 2010, he was inducted into the International Boxing Hall of Fame for the Class of 2011. From 2012 to 2013 he coached professional boxers Alexander Povetkin, Denis Lebedev and Khabib Allakhverdiev. In 2023, his son Tim Tszyu won the World Boxing Organization (WBO) junior-middleweight title.

== Early life ==
Tszyu was born in Serov, a town near the Ural Mountains, in the former Soviet Union to a father of Korean and Mongol descent and a Russian mother. Tszyu's father was a fitter in a metal factory, whereas his mother was a nurse.

== Amateur career ==
As a child, Kostya was hyperactive, so his father decided to take him to a boxing gym, where he would channel that energy by fighting older boys. He impressed the Soviet amateur team coaches and he was sent to the Soviet Union's amateur boxing travelling training camps, where he visited more than 30 countries while training and fighting in tournaments. He trained with that group 250 days a year, and won various tournaments, such as amateur boxing's world championships. At the Cuban world championship tournament in 1987, he came in second place, and at the 1988 Summer Olympics, he lost in the third round.

Tszyu was a member of the Soviet Army, but since he was selected as an elite athlete, he was not required to serve the ordinary duty. He fought at the world championships once again, in Moscow in 1989, where he came in third place.

In 1991, he went again to the amateur world championships, this time held in Sydney. This was a trip that would change his life forever. Not only was the third time his charm, but he felt enchanted with the sights of Sydney and its people, and decided he wanted to live in Australia. Following the collapse of the Soviet Union in 1991, early the next year, Tszyu emigrated to Australia with his girlfriend, where they married in 1993 and became Australian citizens, settling in Sans Souci, Sydney. Before marrying her, though, Tszyu had already turned professional, beating Darrell Hiles by a knockout in one round on 1 March 1992, at Melbourne.

=== Highlights ===
(silver) Schwerin Junior Open (57 kg), Schwerin, East Germany, April 1986:

- Finals: Lost to Jörg Heidenreich (East Germany) by unanimous decision, 5–0

(gold) European Junior Championships (57 kg), Copenhagen, Denmark, September 1986:

- 1/8: Defeated Manuel Moreno (Spain) by unanimous decision, 5–0
- 1/4: Defeated Santo Serio (Italy) by unanimous decision, 5–0
- 1/2: Defeated Daniel Dumitrescu (Romania) by unanimous decision, 5–0
- Finals: Defeated Fared Cheklat (France) by unanimous decision, 5–0

(gold) Soviet International Junior Tournament (60 kg), Tbilisi, Georgian SSR, December 1986:

- Finals: Defeated Nikolay Dzhachvadze (Georgian SSR) RSC 3

(silver) World Junior Championships (60 kg), Havana, Cuba, July 1987:

- 1/4: Defeated D. Boyev (Bulgaria) RSC 3
- 1/2: Defeated Eduardo Rivas (Panama) KO 2
- Finals: Lost to Juan Hernández Sierra (Cuba) by majority decision, 1–4

(gold) Soviet International Tournament (60 kg), Leningrad, Soviet Union, December 1987:

- Finals: Defeated Serik Nurkazov (Kazakh SSR) by unanimous decision, 5–0

(silver) Soviet National Championships (60 kg), Tashkent, Uzbek SSR, January 1988:

- 1/16: Defeated Adylkan Bekbolotov (Kyrgyz SSR) by unanimous decision, 5–0
- 1/8: Defeated Vladimir Kravtsov (RSFSR) by unanimous decision, 5–0
- 1/4: Defeated Serik Nurkazov (Kazakh SSR) by unanimous decision, 5–0
- 1/2: Defeated Samson Khachatryan (Armenian SSR) by unanimous decision, 5–0
- Finals: Lost to Orzubek Nazarov (Kyrgyz SSR) by split decision, 2–3

USA–USSR Duals (60 kg), Moscow, Soviet Union, March 1988:

- Defeated Donald Stokes (United States) on points, 16–8

Pre-Olympic Tournament (60 kg), Seoul, South Korea, March 1988:

- Finals: Defeated Andreas Zülow (East Germany) by majority decision, 4–1

(bronze) Soviet International Tournament (60 kg), Leningrad, Soviet Union, June 1988:

- 1/2: Lost to Julio González (Cuba) on points

Summer Olympics (60 kg), Seoul, South Korea, September 1988:

- 1/32: Defeated Leopoldo Cantancio (Philippines) KO 1 (1:28)
- 1/16: Defeated Sean Knight (Barbados) RSCH 1
- 1/8: Lost to Andreas Zülow (East Germany) by split decision, 2–3

(gold) Soviet National Championships (60 kg), Frunze, Kyrgyz SSR, January 1989:

- 1/2: Defeated Yevgeny Burchak (RSFSR)
- Finals: Defeated Orzubek Nazarov (Kyrgyz SSR) RSC 3

(gold) Golden Belt Tournament (60 kg), Bucharest, Romania, April 1989:

- (no data available)

(gold) European Championships (60 kg), Athens, Greece, May–June 1989:

- 1/8: Defeated Andreas Zülow (East Germany) by split decision, 3–2
- 1/4: Defeated George Cramne (Sweden) by unanimous decision, 5–0
- 1/2: Defeated Dave Anderson (Scotland) by walkover
- Finals: Defeated Daniel Dumitrescu (Romania) by majority decision, 4–1

(bronze) World Championships (60 kg), Moscow, Soviet Union, September 1989:

- 1/8: Defeated Mark Ramsey (England) on points, 22–3
- 1/4: Defeated Bo Espensen (Denmark) RSCH 2
- 1/2: Lost to Andreas Zülow (East Germany) on points, 14–17

Bulgaria–Europe Duals (60 kg), Varna, Bulgaria, November 1989:

- Defeated Emil Chuprenski (Bulgaria) RET 2

(gold) Mayor's Cup (63,5 kg), Manila, Philippines, November 1989:

- 1/4: Defeated Nelson Factoranan (Philippines) KO 1
- 1/2: Defeated Andreas Otto (East Germany) by decision
- Finals: Defeated Shannan Taylor (Australia) by unanimous decision, 5–0

(gold) King's Cup (63,5 kg), Bangkok, Thailand, February 1990:

- Finals: Defeated Andreas Zülow (East Germany) on points, 17–7

USA–USSR Duals (63,5 kg), Moscow, Soviet Union, April 1990:

- Defeated Terron Millett (United States) by unanimous decision, 3–0

(gold) Soviet National Championships (63,5 kg), Lutsk, Ukrainian SSR, April 1990:

- 1/2: Defeated Vasily Kirilov (RSFSR)
- Finals: Defeated Aleksandr Banin (Belarus SSR) by decision

(gold) Goodwill Games (63,5 kg), Seattle, Washington, July 1990:

- 1/4: Defeated Vukašin Dobrašinović (Yugoslavia) by walkover
- 1/2: Defeated Terron Millett (United States) by unanimous decision, 5–0
- Finals: Defeated Aleksandr Banin (Soviet Union) by unanimous decision, 5–0

(gold) Swedish International Tournament (67 kg), Göteborg, Sweden, December 1990:

- Finals: Defeated Sergey Pogosov (Soviet Union) RSC 3

(gold) Soviet National Championships (63,5 kg), Kazan, Tatar SSR, February 1991:

- 1/2: Defeated Vasily Kirilov (RSFSR)
- Finals: Defeated Oleg Nikolayev (RSFSR) by unanimous decision, 5–0

USA–USSR Duals (63,5 kg), Spokane, Washington, March 1991:

- Lost to Vernon Forrest (United States) by split decision, 2–3

(gold) European Championships (63,5 kg), Göteborg, Sweden, May 1991:

- 1/16: Defeated James Pender (Scotland) on points, 21–0
- 1/8: Defeated Darren McCarrick (England) RSC 1
- 1/4: Defeated Attila Arslan (Turkey) RSC 2
- 1/2: Defeated Vukašin Dobrašinović (Yugoslavia) on points, 26–6
- Finals: Defeated Andreas Zülow (Germany) on points, 33–11

(gold) World Championships (63,5 kg), Sydney, Australia, November 1991:

- 1/8: Defeated Albertano Caballero (Mexico) RSC 2
- 1/4: Defeated Aníbal Acevedo (Puerto Rico) on points, 29–10
- 1/2: Defeated Moses James (Nigeria) on points, 25–4
- Finals: Defeated Vernon Forrest (United States) on points, 32–9

=== 1992 Olympics ===
He was the only Soviet boxer to win a gold medal at the 1991 World Championships in Sydney. Immediately at the Championships he was approached by local boxing promoters, deciding to pass up the 1992 Summer Olympics in favor of a professional career. A week later he signed with Australian promoter Bill Mordey as his manager and Johnny Lewis as his trainer in Sydney. Tszyu finished his amateur career with 270 fights, 259 wins, 11 losses, no stoppages and no draws. His professional debut was scheduled to take place in January 1992. Mordey described Tszyu as the best boxer he had seen in the past decade.

== Professional career ==
Tszyu started raising his quality of opposition almost immediately. In his fourth professional bout, he met the former WBC Featherweight Champion Juan Laporte, decisioning him over ten rounds. In his sixth bout, he beat contender Sammy Fuentes by a knockout in the first. Fuentes would go on to win a world title years after being handily beaten by Tszyu in 1993, Steve Larrimore, Larry La Crousiere and Robert Rivera, went to Australia to fight Tszyu, and none lasted more than two rounds. The only man to last more than two rounds with Tszyu in 1993 was Livingstone Bramble, a former World Lightweight Champion, who lost by decision to Tszyu at Newcastle, New South Wales.

In 1994, Héctor López, Angel Hernandez (who had just come off of a loss after challenging Julio César Chávez for the WBC belt), and Pedro Chinito Sanchez from the Dominican Republic tried to beat Tszyu, but Tszyu beat Lopez by a decision in ten, Hernandez by a knockout in seven, and Sanchez by a knockout in four. After the win against Sanchez, Tszyu was ranked number one in the light welterweight division.

=== WBC light-welterweight champion ===
In 1995, he received his first world title shot when he fought IBF Light Welterweight Champion Jake Rodríguez at Las Vegas, Nevada. Tszyu became world champion by knocking Rodriguez out in the sixth round. He then defended the world title, beating former Super Featherweight and Light Welterweight World Champion Roger Mayweather by a decision in 12, Hugo Pineda by a knockout in 11, Cory Johnson by a knockout in four and Jan Bergman by a knockout in six. After this string of defences, Tszyu became a highly touted world Champion by many boxing magazines, and many articles about him appeared on The Ring, KO Magazine and other American boxing publications.

==== Title defences ====
Tsyzu began 1997 with a title defense against Leonardo Moro Mas. Tsyzu knocked Mas down three times in the first round. Including a blow shortly before the bell. In a controversial decision, referee Joe Cortez judged that it was an "unintentional illegal blow", believing it to be shortly after the bell. As Mas was either unable or unwilling to continue, Cortez called the bout a technical draw. The IBF and the Nevada Athletic Commission later declared it a no-contest. In his next fight he would suffer his first loss, a 10th round knockout to Vince Phillips, who would claim the world title.

After beating former world champions Calvin Grove (KO 1) and Rafael Ruelas (KO 9), Tszyu was given another world title try, when the WBC's belt became vacant in 1998 following Oscar De La Hoya's move to the welterweight division. Tszyu found himself twice on the canvas in round one of his fight for the interim belt against Diosbelys Hurtado, but recuperated to beat Hurtado by a knockout in five. He became world champion once again in 1999 by knocking out former world champion Miguel Ángel González in ten, and twice retained it in 2000, beating Arizona's fringe contender Ahmed Santos in eight, and a 38-year-old Mexican legend Julio César Chávez, the former world champion, in six at Phoenix, Arizona. Kostya was interviewed by Ray Wheatley on YouTube in 2011 and stated he regards his win over Miguel Angel Gonzalez as his best ever performance.

=== Undisputed light-welterweight champion ===
Tszyu then began pursuing his wish to unify all the belts. In 2001, he began by facing WBA Champion Sharmba Mitchell, taking the belt by a TKO after seven rounds (Mitchell suffered a knee injury in training, and during the bout). His next fight was against the German Turk, Oktay Urkal. Tszyu finished 2001 by recovering his IBF belt in a unification bout with the current champion Zab Judah, by a knockout in the second round. A small melee inside the ring followed that fight when Judah attacked referee Jay Nady for what he felt was a premature stoppage, reacting by throwing his corner's seat at the referee and even trying to choke Nady with his glove at one point. However, replays clearly show Judah walking on wobbly legs. As a result, Tszyu became the first man in 30 years to unify the belts in the light welterweight division.

Tszyu in 2002 had only one bout, beating the top-ranked contender of all three of his belts, Ben Tackie of Ghana by a decision in twelve rounds. Tszyu lost only one round on only one of the judges scorecards in a masterful display of boxing.

On 19 January 2003, Tszyu began the year by retaining his title against former world champion Jesse James Leija by a knockout in six. After the fight, held in Melbourne, Tszyu announced that fight could be his last in Australia, due to pressure from promoters to fight in the United States (The win against Leija came on the birthday of Tszyu's son.).

=== Tszyu vs. Mitchell II ===
His first fight in 2004 was supposed to have been held on 7 February in a rematch against Sharmba Mitchell. It would have been Tszyu's first fight as a professional in Moscow, but Tszyu injured his shoulder during training. He had successful surgery to correct the problem, but the injury further extended his absence from the ring. The WBA stripped Tszyu of his title for choosing to fight Mitchell instead of their regular champion, Vivian Harris, while the WBC stripped Tszyu for refusing to fight their mandatory, Gianluca Branco.

On 6 November, he and Mitchell finally had their rematch, with Tszyu knocking Mitchell out once again, this time in three rounds. Tszyu was voted comeback fighter of the year by Ring magazine.

=== Dethroned by Hatton ===
He next fought on 5 June 2005, against British boxer Ricky Hatton, Tszyu lost this fight and his world title after retiring on his stool at the end of the 11th round. He was also behind on all three cards (by 1, 3 and 5 points).

=== Potential comeback ===
On 30 January 2007 rumours spread of a Tszyu comeback. However, there was no confirmation. In April 2010, rumours about a possible comeback of Tszyu spread again. He continued to train and stayed in shape since his 2005 loss to Ricky Hatton. On 19 April 2010, Tszyu appeared on Long Lunch Today, an Australian TV program. During the show, he denied his retirement and said he would return if a fight with Shane Mosley, Manny Pacquiao or Floyd Mayweather Jr. could be made.

== Personal life ==
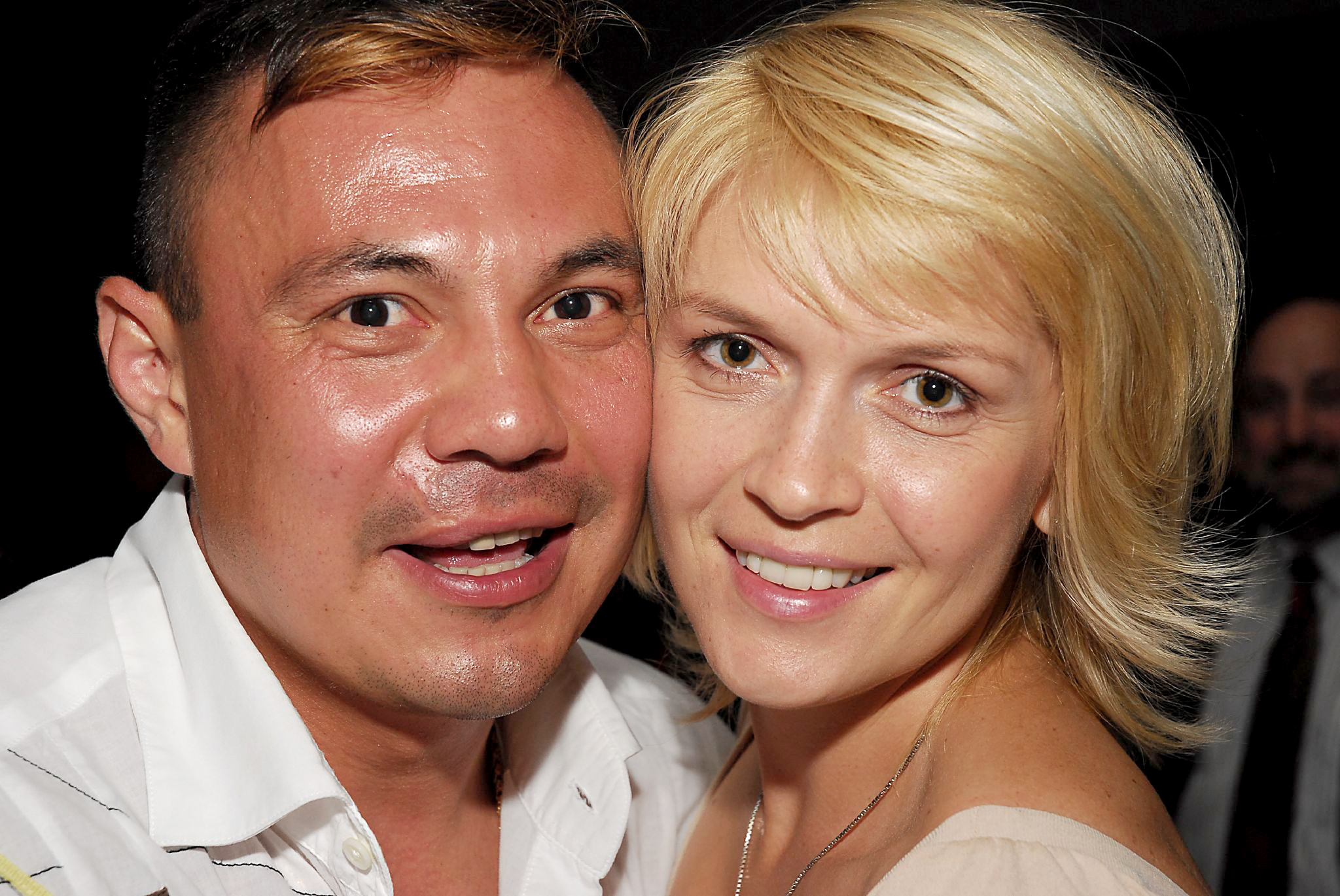
Kostya and Natasha Tszyu, 2007

Tszyu married Natasha Anikina on 24 September 1993. He has three children; Anastasia, Nikita and Tim. Nikita and Tim are both boxers. Tszyu initially moved with his family to Moscow in 2008, but they returned to Sydney, New South Wales, Australia. In September 2012, Tszyu left his family in Australia while he moved full-time to live in Russia. Tszyu is now married to Tatiana Averina, with whom he has two children, and runs a restaurant in Moscow.

Tszyu is an animal lover who owns several pets including Viking, a rottweiler who has been Tszyu's companion since he arrived in Australia; Jake, his pet diamond python; canaries and fish. Tszyu appeared with the animals on the pet show Harry's Practice in 2002.

== Legal disputes ==
Tszyu has been in several court battles with his managers. Most recently, his ex-manager Susie Bennell took him to court, alleging Tszyu owed her money. Tszyu was also ordered to repay $3.5 million to his former manager Bill Mordey in an unrelated civil suit. In journalist Paul Kent's biography of long time trainer Johnny Lewis, allegations were made that Tszyu had underpaid Lewis for his services. The dispute was settled out of court.

== Professional boxing record ==
34 fights	31 wins	2 losses
By knockout	25	2
By decision	6	0
No contests	1	

No.	Result	Record	Opponent	Type	Round, time	Date	Location	Notes
34	Loss	31–2 (1)	Ricky Hatton	RTD	11 (12), 3:00	4 Jun 2005	MEN Arena, Manchester, England	Lost IBF and The Ring light-welterweight titles
33	Win	31–1 (1)	Sharmba Mitchell	TKO	3 (12), 2:48	6 Nov 2004	Glendale Arena, Phoenix, Arizona, US	Retained IBF and The Ring light-welterweight titles
32	Win	30–1 (1)	Jesse James Leija	RTD	6 (12), 3:00	19 Jan 2003	Telstra Dome, Melbourne, Australia	Retained WBA (Unified), WBC, IBF, and The Ring light-welterweight titles
31	Win	29–1 (1)	Ben Tackie	UD	12	18 May 2002	Mandalay Bay Events Center, Paradise, Nevada, US	Retained WBA (Super), WBC, IBF, and The Ring light-welterweight titles
30	Win	28–1 (1)	Zab Judah	TKO	2 (12), 2:59	3 Nov 2001	MGM Grand Garden Arena, Paradise, Nevada, US	Retained WBA (Super) and WBC light-welterweight titles; Won IBF light-welterweight title
29	Win	27–1 (1)	Oktay Urkal	UD	12	23 Jun 2001	Mohegan Sun Arena, Montville, Connecticut, US	Retained WBA (Super) and WBC light-welterweight titles
28	Win	26–1 (1)	Sharmba Mitchell	RTD	7 (12), 3:00	3 Feb 2001	Mandalay Bay Events Center, Paradise, Nevada, US	Retained WBC light-welterweight title; Won WBA (Super) light-welterweight title
27	Win	25–1 (1)	Julio César Chávez	TKO	6 (12), 1:28	29 Jul 2000	Veteran's Memorial Coliseum, Phoenix, Arizona, US	Retained WBC light-welterweight title
26	Win	24–1 (1)	Ahmed Santos	TKO	8 (12), 0:36	12 Feb 2000	Mohegan Sun Arena, Montville, Connecticut, US	Retained WBC light-welterweight title
25	Win	23–1 (1)	Miguel Angel Gonzalez	TKO	10 (12), 0:48	21 Aug 1999	Miccosukee Resort & Gaming, Miami, Florida, US	Won vacant WBC light-welterweight title
24	Win	22–1 (1)	Diosbelys Hurtado	TKO	5 (12), 2:35	28 Nov 1998	Fantasy Springs Resort Casino, Indio, California, US	Won WBC interim light-welterweight title
23	Win	21–1 (1)	Rafael Ruelas	TKO	9 (12), 0:21	15 Aug 1998	County Coliseum, El Paso, Texas, US	
22	Win	20–1 (1)	Calvin Grove	KO	1 (10), 2:59	5 Apr 1998	Entertainment Centre, Newcastle, Australia	
21	Win	19–1 (1)	Ismael Armando Chaves	TKO	3 (12), 2:20	6 Dec 1997	Stockland Stadium, Townsville, Australia	
20	Loss	18–1 (1)	Vince Phillips	TKO	10 (12), 1:22	31 May 1997	Etess Arena, Atlantic City, New Jersey, US	Lost IBF light-welterweight title
19	NC	18–0 (1)	Leonardo Mas	TD	1 (12), 3:00	18 Jan 1997	Thomas & Mack Center, Paradise, Nevada, US	IBF light-welterweight title at stake; Originally a TD after Mas sustained a fractured jaw from an accidental foul, later ruled an NC
18	Win	18–0	Jan Piet Bergman	KO	6 (12), 1:23	14 Sep 1996	Entertainment Centre, Newcastle, Australia	Retained IBF light-welterweight title
17	Win	17–0	Corey Johnson	KO	4 (12), 1:21	24 May 1996	Entertainment Centre, Sydney, Australia	Retained IBF light-welterweight title
16	Win	16–0	Hugo Pineda	TKO	11 (12), 2:38	20 Jan 1996	Parramatta Stadium, Sydney, Australia	Retained IBF light-welterweight title
15	Win	15–0	Roger Mayweather	UD	12	25 Jun 1995	Entertainment Centre, Newcastle, Australia	Retained IBF light-welterweight title
14	Win	14–0	Jake Rodríguez	TKO	6 (12), 1:50	28 Jan 1995	MGM Grand Garden Arena, Paradise, Nevada, US	Won IBF light-welterweight title
13	Win	13–0	Pedro Sanchez	TKO	4 (10)	29 Aug 1994	Flinders Park, Melbourne, Australia	
12	Win	12–0	Angel Hernandez	RTD	7 (10), 3:00	2 May 1994	Entertainment Centre, Newcastle, Australia	
11	Win	11–0	Hector Lopez	UD	10	11 Jan 1994	Hyatt Regency, Tampa, Florida, US	
10	Win	10–0	Livingstone Bramble	UD	10	23 Aug 1993	Newcastle, Australia	
9	Win	9–0	Robert Rivera	KO	1 (10), 1:27	18 Jun 1993	Entertainment Centre, Newcastle, Australia	
8	Win	8–0	Larry LaCoursiere	TKO	1 (10)	14 May 1993	Entertainment Centre, Newcastle, Australia	
7	Win	7–0	Steve Larrimore	TKO	2 (10), 1:56	30 Jan 1993	The Pyramid, Memphis, Tennessee, US	
6	Win	6–0	Sammy Fuentes	TKO	1 (10), 0:54	13 Nov 1992	Festival Hall, Melbourne, Australia	
5	Win	5–0	Daniel Ricardo Cusato	TKO	7 (10)	11 Sep 1992	Sydney, Australia	
4	Win	4–0	Juan Laporte	UD	10	23 Jul 1992	Convention and Exhibition Centre, Sydney, Australia	
3	Win	3–0	Tony Jones	TKO	2 (10), 0:15	7 May 1992	Convention and Exhibition Centre, Sydney, Australia	
2	Win	2–0	Nedrick Simmons	KO	1 (8), 1:58	2 Apr 1992	Sydney, Australia	
1	Win	1–0	Darrell Hiles	TKO	1 (8), 1:10	1 Mar 1992	Princes Park, Melbourne, Australia	

== Titles in boxing ==
=== Major world titles ===
- WBA (Super) light welterweight champion (140 lbs)
- WBC light welterweight champion (140 lbs)
- IBF light welterweight champion (140 lbs) (2×)

=== The Ring magazine titles ===
- The Ring light welterweight champion (140 lbs)

=== Interim world titles ===
- WBC interim light welterweight champion (140 lbs)

=== Undisputed titles ===
- Undisputed light welterweight champion (Note: First and only undisputed light welterweight champion in the three-belt era.)

=== Honorary titles ===
- WBC Emeritus Champion

== Video albums ==
Title	Details	Certification
Destiny	Released: 2002	ARIA: Gold

== Notes ==
Sporting positions
World boxing titles
Preceded by Jake Rodríguez	IBF light-welterweight champion 28 January 1995 – 31 May 1997	Succeeded by Vince Phillips
New title	WBC light-welterweight champion Interim title 28 November 1998 – 21 August 1999; Won full title	Vacant Title next held by Lucas Matthysse
Vacant Title last held by Oscar De La Hoya	WBC light-welterweight champion 21 August 1999 – 9 October 2003; Stripped	Vacant Title next held by Arturo Gatti
New title Unified against Sharmba Mitchell	WBA light-welterweight champion Super title 3 February 2001 – 16 June 2004; Stripped; Status changed to Unified champion from August 5, 2002; Status changed to Undisputed champion from July 2003	Vacant Title next held by Ricky Hatton
Preceded by Zab Judah	IBF light welterweight champion 3 November 2001 – 4 June 2005	Succeeded by Ricky Hatton
Vacant Title last held by Aaron Pryor	The Ring light-welterweight champion 2 December 2001 – 4 June 2005	Succeeded by Ricky Hatton
Vacant Title last held by Takeshi Fuji	Undisputed light-welterweight champion 3 November 2001 – 9 October 2003; Titles fragmented	Vacant Title next held by Terence Crawford
Awards
Previous: Vince Phillips	The Ring Comeback of the Year; 1998	Next: Michael Carbajal
