= César Bazán =

Mexican boxer (born 1974)

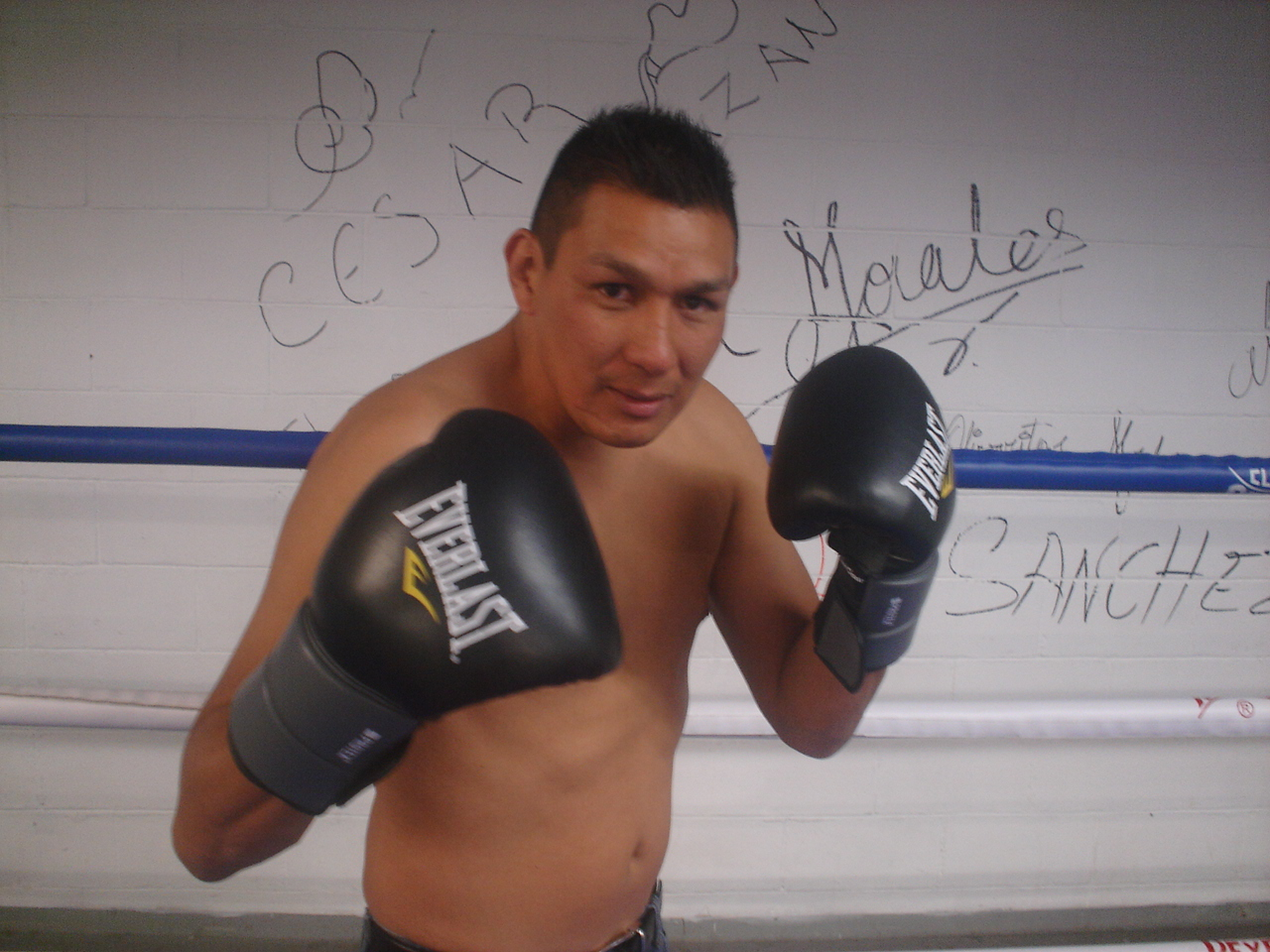
- Bazán in 2011

Personal information
- Nickname: El Paso
- Born: César Bazán Pérez; 13 December 1974 (age 51) Mexico City, Mexico
- Height: 6 ft (183 cm)
- Weight: Welterweight; Light welterweight Lightweight

Boxing career
- Reach: 75 in (191 cm)
- Stance: Orthodox

Boxing record
- Total fights: 61
- Wins: 49
- Win by KO: 32
- Losses: 11
- Draws: 1

César Bazán Pérez (born 13 December 1974) is a Mexican former professional boxer who competed from 1992 to 2012. He held the WBC lightweight title from 1998 to 1999.

== Professional career ==
Bazán grew up in Colonia Valle Gómez and turned pro at age 17 to make some money. He made his professional debut on 13 April 1992, defeating Miguel Pérez on points in Mexico City.

=== WBC lightweight title ===
Bazán captured the WBC lightweight title by upsetting an undefeated Stevie Johnston in 1998. Bazan defended the belt twice before losing it in a rematch to Johnston in 1999, even though Johnston had a point deducted in Round 3 for punching to the back of Bazan's head.

=== Bazán vs. Castillo ===
In 2001 César took on WBC lightweight champion, José Luis Castillo but went on to lose the championship bout.

He has not fought for a title since, although he continues to fight and recently lost a split decision to Cristian Bejarano in a foul filled fight in which Bazan was docked a point for a low blow in the fourth and Bejarano was docked a point for a headbutt in the 11th.

=== Retirement ===
César lost a light-welterweight bout to Irish fighter Paul McCloskey on a decision in Donegal, Ireland, on 29 March 2008. Although he attacked McCloskey very little during the fight, he did display some durability, as he took considerable punishment and lasted to the finish. He later moved to El Paso.

== See also ==
- List of Mexican boxing world champions
- List of WBC world champions
- List of lightweight boxing champions

Preceded by Stevie Johnston	WBC Lightweight Champion; 13 Jun 1998 – 27 Feb 1999	Succeeded by Stevie Johnston
