= Leavander Johnson =

American boxer (1969–2005)

Personal information
- Nationality: American
- Born: Leavander Johnson; December 24, 1969 Atlantic City, New Jersey, United States
- Died: September 22, 2005 (aged 35) Las Vegas, Nevada, United States
- Weight: Lightweight

Boxing career
- Stance: Orthodox

Boxing record
- Total fights: 42
- Wins: 34
- Win by KO: 26
- Losses: 5
- Draws: 2
- No contests: 1

Leavander Johnson (December 24, 1969 – September 22, 2005) was an American lightweight boxer from Atlantic City, New Jersey, who once held the International Boxing Federation version of the world title. He won the title on June 17, 2005, against the Italian fighter Stefano Zoff, winning after the referee stopped the fight in the seventh round. Johnson win his first IBF title defense. After walking out of the ring following that fight, he collapsed in the locker room and died of brain injuries several days later.

== Biography ==
Johnson made his debut as a professional boxer in 1989 following a successful amateur career, during which he fought in over 130 contests. As a professional he quickly built on his reputation as a top prospect by remaining undefeated after his first 22 contests (one, against Wilfredo Rivera, of which was drawn). His next fight was against another highly rated youngster, Sharmba Mitchell (who was also undefeated as a professional). Johnson won the fight, earning himself his first world title shot, by knocking his opponent out in the eighth round. The world title fight came on August 6, 1994 against Miguel Ángel González for the WBC Lightweight crown. The fight, which was fought in Ciudad Juárez, Mexico, ended with Johnson suffering his first loss as a professional, the fight being stopped in the eighth round

Johnson got his second world title shot in May 1997, this time challenging Orzubek Nazarov for the WBA version of the lightweight world title. Johnson's challenge once again proved unsuccessful as the fight was stopped in the seventh round for his second loss. He did not fight in another world championship fight for six and a half years after this, during which time he lost once more after he was disqualified for headbutting Michael Clark during a contest in Atlantic City. After losing to Javier Jauregui in a fight for the vacant IBF world title in November 2003, he only fought once in the eighteen months after before getting another shot at the IBF crown, against Zoff. Johnson won the fight, in what proved to be the highlight of his career.

Johnson defended his title for the first time on September 17, 2005, against Mexican fighter Jesús Chávez. The fight was stopped early in the 11th round after Johnson received a barrage of punches from his opponent. Despite being able to leave the ring under his own momentum, he collapsed in his dressing room shortly afterwards. He was rushed to the hospital and had emergency surgery to correct a subdural hematoma (swelling and bleeding on the brain). Following the surgery, Johnson was placed in a drug-induced coma. Despite initial fears that he would not survive the night even after the surgery, he survived into the next week and was showing some early signs of improvement, but still remained in critical condition. However, his condition stopped improving and on September 22, 2005, it was decided to discontinue efforts to artificially prolong his life. He was pronounced dead at 4:23 p.m. PDT surrounded by his family.

Johnson's career record was 34 wins (26 by KO), 5 losses, 2 draws, and 1 no contest.

== Safety changes ==
Johnson's death, along with a contest earlier in the year, led to the Nevada Athletic Commission imposing new rules in 2006.

Rule changes were made regarding hydration of boxers, which includes the legalisation of sealed sports beverages with electrolytes in a venue, mandatory tests on nutrition, concussions, weight loss, and hydration for all trainers and seconds, heavier glove requirements (ten-ounce gloves required for 135 pounds and heavier boxers), the use of three ringside physicians (one for each boxer and a third) during each match, and new mandatory inspections of competitors during the weigh-in, before the contest, and immediately after the contest. As of 2024, no boxer has been killed in a professional boxing contest in Nevada since Johnson's death.

== See also ==
- Braydon Smith 23-year-old featherweight collapsed 90 minutes after match and died days later.

Achievements
Regional boxing titles
Preceded by Sharmba Mitchell	NABF Lightweight Champion; March 18 – August 6, 1994; Lost bid for WBC title	Vacant Title next held by Stevie Johnston
Vacant Title last held by Benjamin Modeste	WBC Lightweight Champion; Continental Americas title March 31 – June 30, 2001	Succeeded by Michael Clark
World boxing titles
Preceded by Julio Díaz; Vacates	IBF Lightweight Champion; 17 June 2005 – 17 September 2005	Succeeded by Jesús Chávez
