= Orzubek Nazarov =

Kyrgyz boxer

Orzubek Nazarov Орзубек Пулетович Назаров
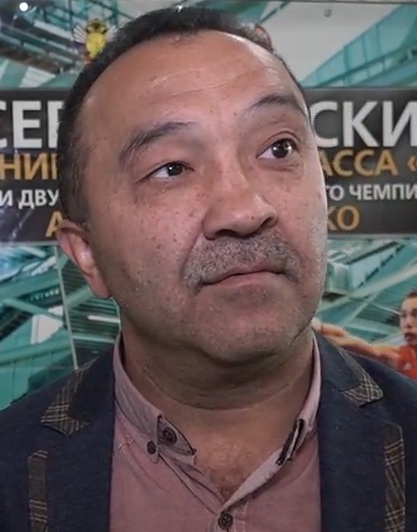
- Nazarov in 2018

Personal information
- Nickname: Gussie
- Nationality: Soviet; Kyrgyzstan
- Born: August 30, 1966 (age 59) Kant, Kyrgyz SSR, USSR
- Height: 5 ft 7 1/2 in (171 cm)
- Weight: Lightweight

Boxing career
- Reach: 71 in (180 cm)
- Stance: Southpaw

Boxing record
- Total fights: 27
- Wins: 26
- Win by KO: 19
- Losses: 1
Medal record
Men's Boxing
Representing Soviet Union
World Amateur Championships
Bronze medal – third place	1986 Reno	Lightweight
European Amateur Championships
Gold medal – first place	1987 Turin	Lightweight

Orzubek Nazarov (born August 30, 1966 in Kant, Kyrgyz SSR) is a Kyrgyz boxer, who won the bronze medal at the 1986 World Amateur Boxing Championships in Reno. He is a former WBA Lightweight Champion.

== Amateur career ==
As an amateur Nazarov was the World bronze medalist in 1986 and European champion in 1987 and had a record of 153-12.

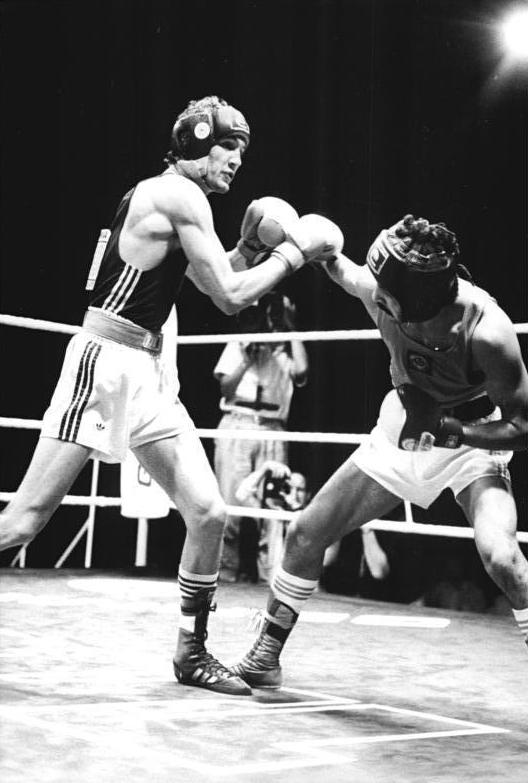
Nazarov (right) versus Andreas Otto of East Germany, 1989

== Professional career ==
The southpaw turned pro in 1990 in Japan, one of the six Amateur Elite boxers (including Yuri Arbachakov) scouted out of the old Soviet Union by the Kyoei Gym.

=== Vs. Dingaan Thobela ===
In 1993 he won the WBA lightweight title against South African Dingaan Thobela via a unanimous decision. His first defence would be a rematch with Thobela, Orzubek also won the second contest via unanimous decision.

=== Vs. Jean Baptiste Mendy ===
Eye problems plagued him and he retired after being upset by Jean Baptiste Mendy in France.

== Professional boxing record ==
27 fights	26 wins	1 loss
By knockout	19	0
By decision	7	1

No.	Result	Record	Opponent	Type	Round, time	Date	Location	Notes
27	Loss	26–1	Jean Baptiste Mendy	UD	12	May 16, 1998	Palais Omnisport de Paris-Bercy, Paris, France	Lost WBA lightweight title
26	Win	26–0	Freddy Cruz	PTS	8	Apr 8, 1998	Galisbay, Guadeloupe	
25	Win	25–0	Oscar Natalio Lopez	KO	4 (10)	Oct 4, 1997	Le Grande Dome, Villebon, Essonne, France	
24	Win	24–0	Leavander Johnson	TKO	7 (12)	May 10, 1997	Convention Center, Miami, Florida, U.S.	Retained WBA lightweight title
23	Win	23–0	Adrianus Taroreh	KO	4 (12)	Apr 15, 1996	Korakuen Hall, Tokyo, Japan	Retained WBA lightweight title
22	Win	22–0	Dindo Canoy	UD	12	Nov 14, 1995	Municipal Gymnasium, Iwaki, Fukushima, Japan	Retained WBA lightweight title
21	Win	21–0	Won Park	KO	2 (12)	May 15, 1995	Korakuen Hall, Tokyo, Japan	Retained WBA lightweight title
20	Win	20–0	Joey Gamache	KO	2 (12)	Dec 10, 1994	Cumberland County Civic Center, Portland, Maine, U.S.	Retained WBA lightweight title
19	Win	19–0	Dingaan Thobela	UD	12	Mar 19, 1994	Nasrec Indoor Arena, Johannesburg, South Africa	Retained WBA lightweight title
18	Win	18–0	Dingaan Thobela	UD	12	Oct 30, 1993	Nasrec Indoor Arena, Johannesburg, South Africa	Won WBA lightweight title
17	Win	17–0	Boy Ligas	PTS	12	Jul 19, 1993	Japan	Retained OPBF lightweight title
16	Win	16–0	Kwang-Shik Song	TKO	2 (12)	Mar 22, 1993	Japan	Retained OPBF lightweight title
15	Win	15–0	Ernie Alesna	TKO	5 (12)	Dec 11, 1992	Ariake Coliseum, Tokyo, Japan	Retained OPBF lightweight title
14	Win	14–0	Noparatnoi Vor Varapol	KO	2 (12)	Sep 28, 1992	Japan	Retained OPBF lightweight title
13	Win	13–0	Francis Velasquez	KO	10 (12)	Jun 24, 1992	Osaka, Japan	Retained OPBF lightweight title
12	Win	12–0	Iwao Otomo	PTS	12	May 11, 1992	Korakuen Hall, Tokyo, Japan	Won OPBF lightweight title
11	Win	11–0	Noparatnoi Vor Varapol	KO	2 (10)	Apr 10, 1992	Metropolitan Gym, Tokyo, Japan	
10	Win	10–0	Takehito Nakano	KO	1 (10)	Feb 17, 1992	Japan	Retained Japanese lightweight title
9	Win	9–0	Daomai Sithkodom	PTS	10	Dec 16, 1991	Japan	
8	Win	8–0	Ernie Alesna	KO	4 (12)	Oct 28, 1991	Japan	
7	Win	7–0	Katsumi Maruyama	KO	2 (10)	Aug 1, 1991	Japan	Retained Japanese lightweight title
6	Win	6–0	Kenji Yagi	TKO	4 (10)	Apr 22, 1991	Japan	Won Japanese lightweight title
5	Win	5–0	Tadashi Domoto	KO	1 (8)	Nov 12, 1990	Korakuen Hall, Tokyo, Japan	
4	Win	4–0	Takashi Saito	KO	1 (?)	Sep 10, 1990	Japan	
3	Win	3–0	Hogan Noguchi	KO	1 (6)	Jul 9, 1990	Korakuen Hall, Tokyo, Japan	
2	Win	2–0	Young Man Jun	TKO	3 (?)	Apr 12, 1990	Korakuen Hall, Tokyo, Japan	
1	Win	1–0	Makoto Nishizawa	TKO	1 (6)	Feb 1, 1990	Kokugikan, Tokyo, Japan	

== See also ==
- List of southpaw stance boxers
- List of world lightweight boxing champions

Sporting positions
Regional boxing titles
Preceded by Kenji Yagi	Japanese lightweight champion April 22, 1991 – 1992; Vacated	Vacant Title next held by Takashi Saito
Preceded by Iwao Otomo	OPBF lightweight champion May 11, 1992 – 1993; Vacated	Vacant Title next held by Adrianus Taroreh
World boxing titles
Preceded by Dingaan Thobela	WBA lightweight champion October 30, 1993 – May 16, 1998	Succeeded by Jean Baptiste Mendy
