= Johnny Lewis (boxing trainer) =

Australian boxing trainer

John Alfred Lewis
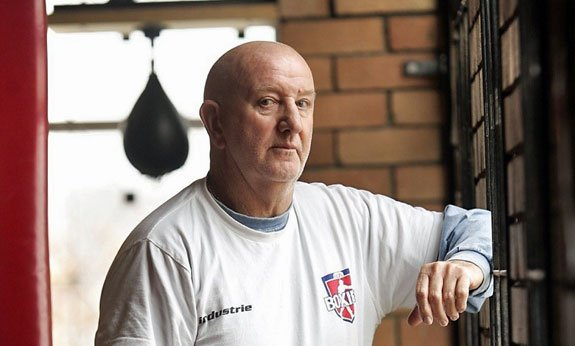
- Johnny Lewis at Newtown Boxing Club, 2017

Personal information
- Nickname: Johnny
- Nationality: Australian
- Born: 18 March 1944 Erskineville, New South Wales, Australia

Boxing career

John Alfred “Johnny” Lewis OAM (born 18 March 1944) is an Australian boxing trainer and the head coach of six world champions, most notably Jeff Fenech, Jeff Harding, Gairy St. Clair and Kostya Tszyu.

Lewis’ career spans from training amateur boxers on the local Sydney circuit to working with Australian boxing champions and rugby league international representatives. The philosophies and coaching career of Lewis merited him many accolades including an Order of Australia medal and an induction into the International Boxing Hall of Fame, both of which were achieved in 2006. Due to these accolades, Lewis has been asserted as one of Australia's most acclaimed boxing coaches.

== Early life ==
John Alfred Lewis was born on 18 March 1944 at Bankstown hospital to father Alfred and mother Marge Lewis. His family lived in Wallangarra at the time, before moving into a housing commission flat in Erskineville, in Sydney's inner-west.

Lewis' first employment was selling papers at Australian rules football games as well as working the scoreboard at Erskineville Oval for local first-grade Australian Rules matches, where he would listen to coaches’ team talks. Lewis played football and tennis throughout his teenage years. An athletic career for Lewis was cut short at age 19 when he sustained an ankle injury after falling off a ladder while sign writing.

In 1957, a thirteen-year-old Lewis began training under coaches Snowy MacFadyen and Jack Blom at the Newtown Police Boys Club, travelling to Cowra, Orange, Griffith and Singleton in regional New South Wales for amateur boxing competitions. As a physically disadvantaged boxer, Lewis trained under Dick O’Connor until he was 17, without losing a fight under his guidance. Lewis models much of his coaching style on O’Connor's.

== Amateur coaching career ==
Lewis’ introduction to coaching came by coincidence - at age 17 as his coach Ken Shorter, assigned him to corner six amateur boxers at a tournament in Parramatta, all of which won their respective bouts. In 1961, Lewis took over the Newtown PCYC boxing club as its head trainer. A year later, McFaden would re-enter the gym, training alongside Lewis for 3 years.

In 1966, Lewis moved to the Botany Street gym in partnership with Mick Fernandez, where Fernandez would train professional fighters and Lewis would train the amateur fighters. Fernandez also taught Lewis how to wrap hands and clean cuts. Later, Lewis would incorporate Fernandez into Snowy Robbin's gym in Erskineville.

In 1978, Phil McElwaine won a gold medal in the middleweight division at the Commonwealth Games in Edmonton, Canada with Lewis in his corner.

In November 1988, Lewis was appointed head trainer for the Australian Amateur Boxing Team for the Seoul Olympics.

=== Young Offenders Program ===
In January 1986, Lewis took several of his fighters including Jeff Fenech to Parklea Prison to spar inmates in makeshift rings, the point of which was to demonstrate the outcomes of poor behaviour for his fighters and an appropriate outlet of aggression for the prisoners.

Brian Moore started the Young Offenders Program in the Newtown Police Boys Club. Lewis would join this partnership by continuing to take boxers to prisons across New South Wales. As the program developed it became more theoretical, boxers would spar less and instead hand out Big League Magazines and videos of boxing matches.

== Professional coaching career ==
=== Summary ===
The professional career of Lewis catalysed due to the rapid rise of Jeff Fenech. This in turn caused Jeff Harding to relocate from Grafton to train under him and Russian World Amateur Champion Kostya Tszyu to turn professional under Lewis’ tutelage. These accreditations prompted several fighters to also be trained by Lewis.

=== Fighters Trained ===
==== Virgil Hill ====
American Virgil Hill moved to Australia to train at Newtown in an attempt to regain his world light-heavyweight title. In 1992 was Hill's third fight under Lewis, in which he won a unanimous decision against Frank Tate to gain the vacant WBA light heavyweight title. This was a short-term partnership however as Hill returned to the United States after the victory.

==== Joe Bugner ====
In 1986, Joe Bugner came out of retirement for one last campaign, aiming to fight heavyweight champion Mike Tyson. In moving to Australia, Bugner went on a three-fight win streak before stopped in the eighth round by Frank Bruno. Bugner had domestic success after his partnership with Lewis, winning the Australian Heavyweight title.

At the peak of Bugner's comeback, he won a unanimous decision against Greg Page in Sydney. On this card, Johnny Lewis had Jeff Harding finish Johnny Tapau Sr in the second round and Peter Mitrevski winning a decision over Charlie Brown.

==== Justin Rowsell ====
Following the 1992 Olympics, Justin Roswell, a promising Australian amateur turned professional under Lewis, winning the WBO intercontinental lightweight championship. Rowsell had a more acclaimed amateur career however, with a bronze medal at the 1991 Amateur Boxing World Championships, a gold medal at the Canada Cup and a Commonwealth games silver medal.

==== Gairy St. Clair ====
In his training with Lewis, Gairy St. Clair won the International Boxing Federation and International Boxing Organization World Super Featherweight Title in South Africa, winning a unanimous decision 116–112, 115–113, 115–114 over Cassius Baloyi. Lewis regarded St Clair as not only one of the best movers he'd trained but seen.

==== Billy Dib ====
Billy Dib would win his first world title, the IBO Super-featherweight championship in 2008 against Zolani Marali after switching trainers to have Lewis in his corner. While a brief training partnership, Dib became Lewis’ sixth World Title holder.

==== Jeff Malcolm ====
Jeff Malcolm was managed by New South Wales Blues and Australian Kangaroos Rugby League representative Tommy Raudonikis while being trained by Lewis. Lewis trained Malcolm for sixteen years, holding the Australian Super Lightweight Title before relocating to the United States in the quest for a world title.

==== Peter Mitrevski ====
Peter Mitrevski won the vacant Australian flyweight title against Charlie Brown in 1988 under the training of Lewis. Lewis stated Mitrevski may not go any further in the sport of boxing, suggesting his retirement. Mitrevski was upset by this statement however stayed with Lewis due to his friendship with Jeff Fenech.

==== Paul Briggs ====
Paul Briggs asked Lewis to take over his training after a majority decision loss to Tomasz Adamek for the WBC Light Heavyweight title. After the training of Lewis, Briggs got his rematch against Adamek, only to lose again via majority decision. After this loss, Lewis began to reduce training fighters, giving time to his family.

==== Jeff Fenech ====
Lewis met Fenech in 1981, when Fenech came in to the Newtown boxing gym for Rugby League fitness. Fenech was cornered by Lewis since his professional debut at Blacktown Police Boys Club, with a win over Craig Easey. Lewis was unimpressed by Fenech's fighting style in the early years and tried to implement discipline in Fenech's life in and out of the ring. By this time, Lewis was 37 years-old and had over 20 years of experience training boxers.

After winning a bronze medal at the 1983 Rome World Cup and captaining the Australian amateur team in the 1984 Olympics Fenech would turn professional under Lewis the following year. Fenech stopped Junior Thompson in the fourth round to win the Australian super-fliyweight title in his third fight. With struggles to cut down to the 115-pound junior bantamweight division, Lewis moved Fenech up to bantamweight. Lewis aimed to match Fenech up against different styles to concentrate on one aspect of the sport at a time. This was evidenced by Fenech's matchup against Rolly Navarro, a southpaw. Despite dominating the fight, Lewis ordered Fenech to keep the fight going for his experience.

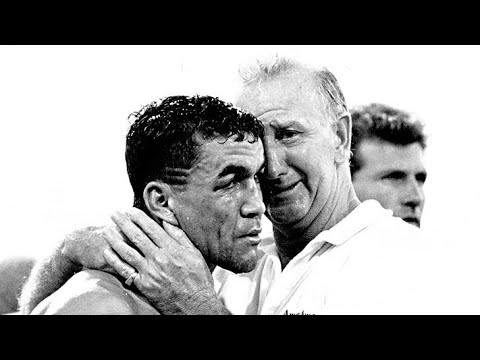
Johnny Lewis with Jeff Fenech

===== Fenech vs Shingaki =====
After only 7 consecutive wins to start his career Fenech would win the IBF World bantamweight title against Satoshi Shingaki. Lewis and manager Bill Mordey accepted a rematch with Shingaki in order to stall top contender Jerome Coffee and give Fenench more experience. In the rematch Fenech broke Shingaki's nose in the first round before stopping him in the third.

===== IBF Title Defences =====
Fenech went 15 rounds with American contender Jerome Coffee before being awarded a unanimous decision victory, 148–140, 146–141 and 145–140. After the title defence, Lewis would have Fenech train under shadow boxing conditions due to broken hand injuries.

Fenech would defend the IBF title against Steve McCrory, despite being dominated in the latter rounds, almost forcing Lewis to throw the towel in.

===== Fenech vs Payakaroon =====
Fenech would knock out Samart Payakaroon in the fourth round to win the WBC Super bantamweight title.

===== WBC Title Defences =====
Fenech earned a technical decision victory over Carlos Zarate after a cut was patched up by Lewis in between rounds.

Lewis notoriously demoralised opponents by picking up his fighter and pushing him toward the centre of the ring before the beginning of each round. Lewis would do this in Fenech's career against Victor Callejas earning him a victory and Azumah Nelson for a split decision draw.

Fenech would lose a rematch against Nelson, Lewis would only not retire his fighter as he felt he deserved a better ending.

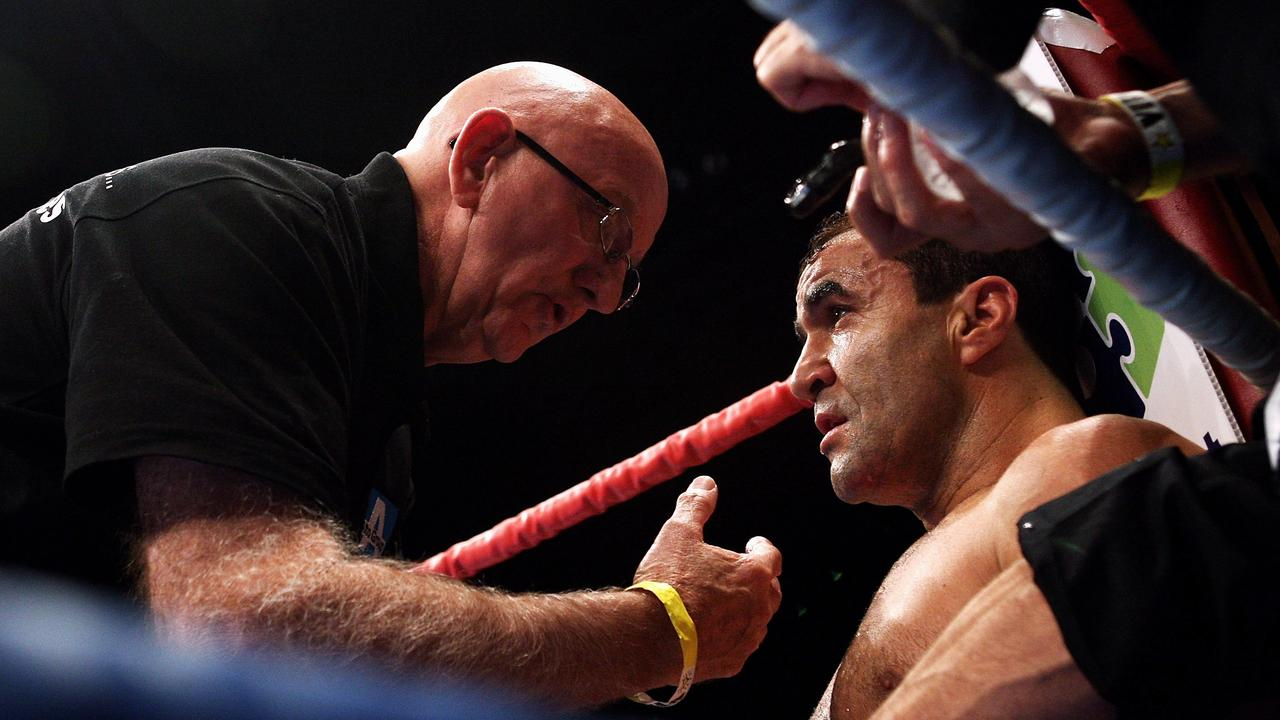
Johnn Lewis cornering Jeff Fenech

Lewis led Fenech to three world titles at bantamweight, featherweight and super featherweight respectively.

==== Jeff Harding ====
Jeff Harding was introduced to Lewis at the 1984 Olympics. Lewis moved Harding up to Light Heavyweight permanently after his New South Wales Cruiserweight title victory in 1988.

In his first fight outside Australia Harding defeated Dennis Andries, trained by Hall of Fame trainer Emmanuel Steward solidifying Lewis amongst the elite boxing trainers. Before the final round, it was revealed that Lewis said “go out one more time and come back world champion.”

==== Kostya Tszyu ====
In coaching the Australian amateur team at the World Championships in Moscow, Lewis met Russian Lightweight Kostya Tszyu. Tszyu would move to Australia permanently to train under Lewis and after an impressive knockout streak that would move him up the professional ranks toward light-welterweight contention.

Tszyu would capture the IBF light-welterweight title in January 1995 against Jake Rodriguez. In 2001, Tszyu would defeat Zab Judah to become the WBC, WBA and IBF champion. Revealed in his biography by Paul Kent, Lewis would feel a rift with Tszyu after allegedly being underpaid. Further revelations involved the attempts of Lewis to depart as head coach, feeling as if he was not needed in the Tszyu camp.

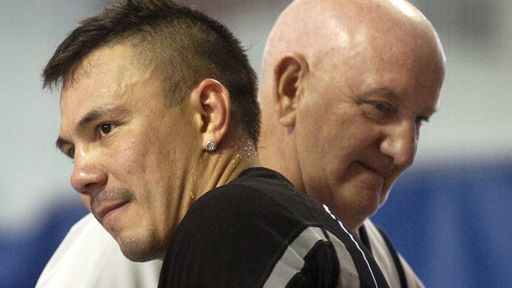
Johnny Lewis and Kostya Tszyu

== Philosophies ==
Lewis would tape a white cross on each of his fighter's wrists, one for him and one for his opponent so they may be watched over during the fight. He would say “we want them all to go down, but we want them all to get up after the count of ten.”

In his early 20s, Lewis journeyed to Thailand and witness the fighters hitting target pads. After noticing the difference in speed that Thai boxers possessed, he would implement pads into his gym at Newtown. Target pads were seen in all boxing gyms in Australia since then, formerly coaches used larger gloves as the target.

Lewis would say “I love you” to all his fighters, sending them out for the next round – revealed in his biography that he was looking for “trust”. Further corner work would involve Lewis pushing his fighter to the middle of the ring before the round began to exhibit a quick recovery and high work rate to demoralise the opponent.

Lewis used a personal solution with a Friars' balsam base to stop cuts and peppermint oil for fighters to sniff before and during the fight for breathing purposes.

Lewis highlighted the importance of high intensity training, likening it to a marathon as it would be easier if run in stages.

== Honours ==
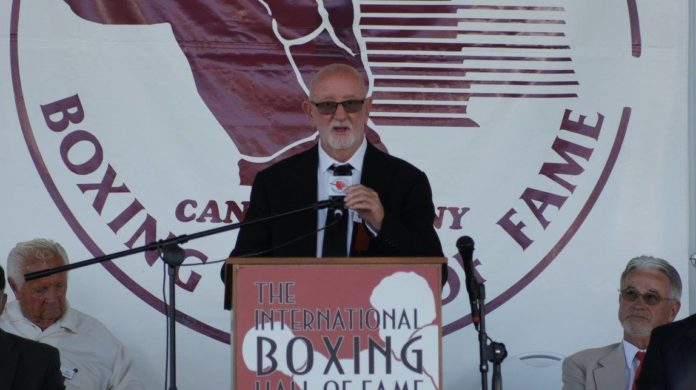
Johnny Lewis Hall of Fame Induction

In December 1989, Lewis was named Coach of the Year at the Sport Australia Awards. At the time, Lewis had two concurrent champions in his gym and held a record of 13–0 in title fights.

In 2006, Lewis was awarded the Medal of the Order of Australia and inducted into the Boxing Hall of Fame.

== Rugby league ==
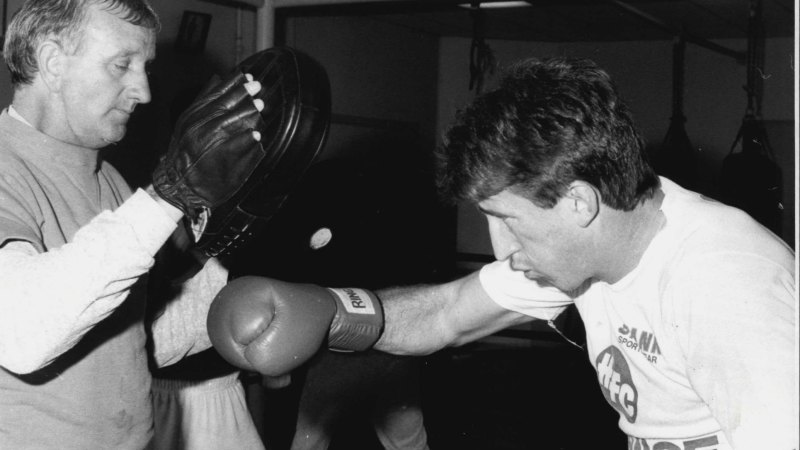
Johnny Lewis padwork with Steve Mortimer

Lewis had been on the Newtown Jets Rugby League Club committee since 1973, when Jack Gibson was appointed coach. Newtown's captain, Tommy Raudonikis trained with Lewis for extra fitness sessions.

In 1989, through rugby league international player, coach and personal friend Bob Fulton, Lewis became a trainer of the Australian Kangaroos 1990 Tour of Great Britain and France.

== Personal life ==
Lewis has lived in Erskineville his whole life, working as a signwriter for the Sydney County Council for majority of it, whilst simultaneously training fighters. Lewis has four children, Brent, Leisa, Jackson and Johnnie Jr.

Lewis operated the Newtown Police Boys Club Boxing gym alongside childhood friend and Newtown Jets centre, Brian Moore.

In April 1999, a hailstorm caused damage to the roof of the Newtown Police Boys Club with repairs costing an approximate one million dollars, the Inner West Council put the building up for sale. At age 61, the gym closure forced Lewis to train fighters at PCYC institutes in Woolloomooloo, South Sydney and Marrickville as well as the HK Ward University of Sydney boxing gym.
