= Ahmed Santos (boxer) =

Mexican boxer

Ahmed Abitai Santos (born February 19, 1974, in Los Mochis, Sinaloa, Mexico) is a newspaper columnist and former boxer.

== Boxing career ==
Santos debuted professionally on October 2, 1992, with a ten-round draw against Francisco Sandoval in Los Mochis. Santos then won seven fights in a row, including a second-round knockout of Sandoval in a rematch held at Culiacán, before moving to Phoenix in 1995.

He kept his winning streak going until April 22, 1996, when he lost to former world title challenger David Sample by a ten-round decision at Tempe, after having reached thirteen wins in a row.

He then won six of his next fights, drawing the other two, with two knockouts. After that, he challenged Pete Talliaferro for the IBA's light welterweight title. He won that belt on September 10, 1997, with a nine-round knockout in Las Vegas. He defended the title only once, losing to Antonio Diaz by a twelve-round decision on December 20 of the same year.

Santos then won three of his next four bouts before challenging for the North American Boxing Federation light welterweight title. Among the three boxers he beat during that span were former world title challenger Billy Irwin and Ricky Quiles.

On April 16, 1999, at Bossier City, Louisiana, he beat Patrick Thomas by a twelve-round decision. On February 12, 2000, he received a shot at WBC light welterweight champion Kostya Tszyu. Santos lost that fight by a knockout in eight rounds.

He went on to lose two of his next three fights before retiring. Santos had a ring record of 26 wins, 5 losses and 4 draws, with 14 wins by knockout.

== Writing career ==
After retiring from boxing, Santos started to write articles for the Phoenix edition of the American Spanish language newspaper, Prensa Hispana. In 2003, Prensa Hispana's main Phoenix competitor, La Voz, lured him to their roster of writers.

He lives in Phoenix, Arizona.
