= Jean Baptiste Mendy =

French boxer (1963–2020)

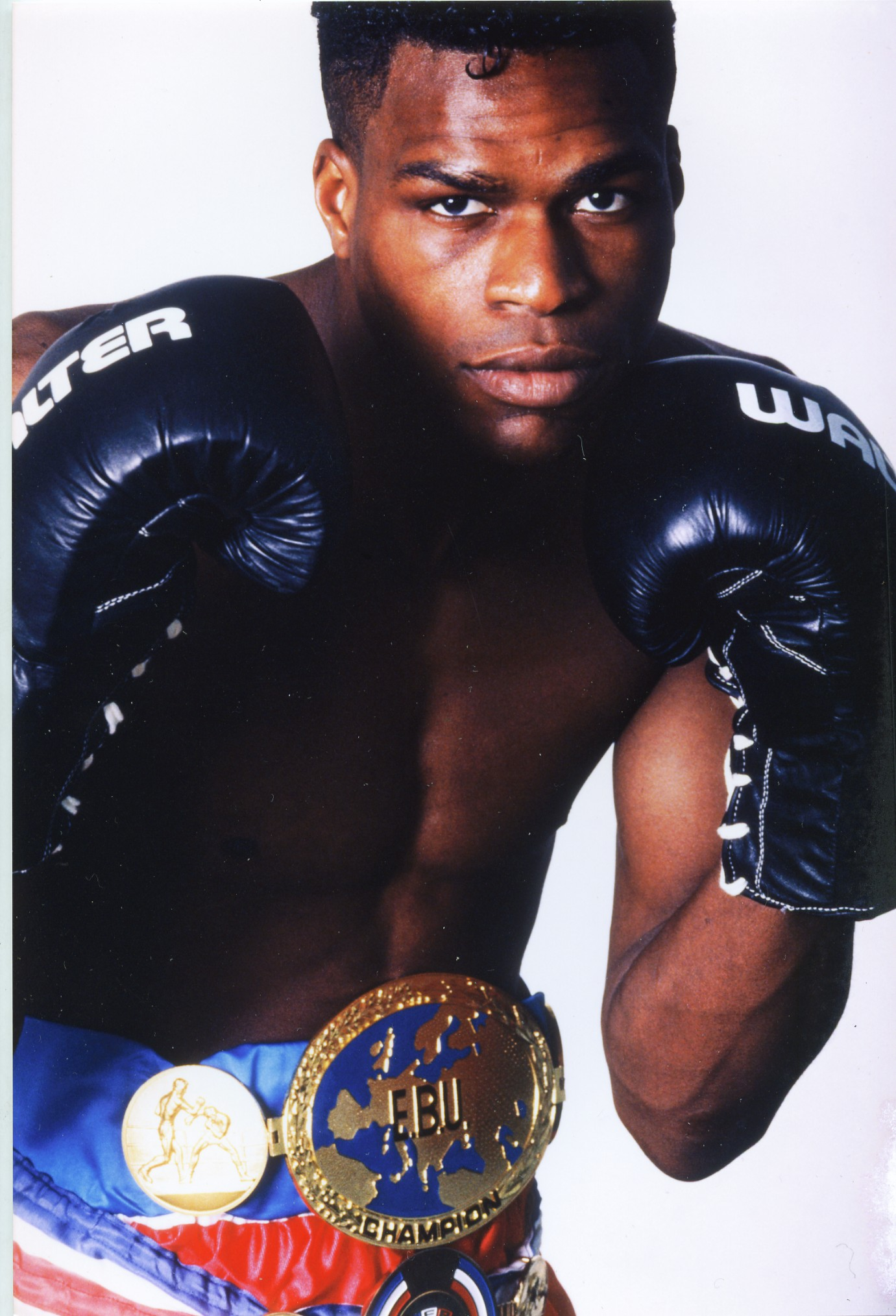
- Photo of Jean-Baptiste Mendy

Personal information
- Nationality: French
- Born: 16 March 1963 Dakar, Senegal
- Died: 31 August 2020 (aged 57) Paris, France
- Height: 5 ft 9 1/2 in (177 cm)
- Weight: Lightweight; Light welterweight

Boxing career
- Stance: Southpaw

Boxing record
- Total fights: 67
- Wins: 55
- Win by KO: 31
- Losses: 8
- Draws: 3
- No contests: 1

Jean-Baptiste Mendy (16 March 1963 – 31 August 2020) was a Senegal-born French professional boxer who competed from 1983 to 2000. He was a two-time lightweight world champion, having held the WBC title from 1996 to 1997 and the WBA title from 1998 to 1999. At regional level he held the European lightweight title twice between 1992 and 1995.

== Professional career ==
Mendy turned professional in 1983 and compiled a record of 45–4–2 (1 NC) before facing Miguel Ángel González for the WBC lightweight title, he would lose via fifth round stoppage.

=== WBC lightweight title ===
Mendy would get another shot at the same title two years later but this time would be successful and won the belt vacated by González by beating Lamar Murphy. He lost the title in his first defense to Stevie Johnston the following year.

=== WBA lightweight title ===
In 1998, he captured the WBA lightweight title with a decision win over Orzubek Nazarov. He defended the belt once before losing it to Julien Lorcy in 1999. He retired the following year.

== Professional boxing record ==
67 fights	55 wins	8 losses
By knockout	31	4
By decision	23	4
By disqualification	1	0
Draws	3	
No contests	1	

No.	Result	Record	Opponent	Type	Round, time	Date	Location	Notes
67	Win	55–8–3 (1)	Pedro García	PTS	8 (8)	2000-04-08	Palais Omnisport de Paris-Bercy, Paris, France	
66	Draw	54–8–3 (1)	Djamel Lifa	PTS	10 (10)	2000-01-31	Paris, France	
65	Win	54–8–2 (1)	Agustin Lorenzo	TKO	4 (?)	1999-11-15	Paris, France	
64	Loss	53–8–2 (1)	Julien Lorcy	TKO	6 (12)	1999-04-10	Palais Omnisport de Paris-Bercy, Paris, France	Lost WBA lightweight title
63	Win	53–7–2 (1)	Alberto Esteban Sicurella	UD	12 (12)	1999-01-25	Palais des Sports, Paris, France	Retained WBA lightweight title
62	Win	52–7–2 (1)	Viktor Baranov	PTS	10 (10)	1998-10-10	Palais Omnisport de Paris-Bercy, Paris, France	
61	Win	51–7–2 (1)	Orzubek Nazarov	UD	12 (12)	1998-05-16	Palais Omnisport de Paris-Bercy, Paris, France	Won WBA lightweight title
60	Loss	50–7–2 (1)	Khalid Rahilou	UD	12 (12)	1998-02-21	Palais Omnisport de Paris-Bercy, Paris, France	For WBA light-welterweight title
59	Win	50–6–2 (1)	Steve Valdez	PTS	8 (8)	1997-12-17	Thiais, France	
58	Loss	49–6–2 (1)	Stevie Johnston	SD	12 (12)	1997-03-01	Halle Georges Carpentier, Paris, France	Lost WBC lightweight title
57	Win	49–5–2 (1)	Lamar Murphy	UD	12 (12)	1996-04-20	Palais Marcel Cerdan, Levallois-Perret, France	Won vacant WBC lightweight title
56	Win	48–5–2 (1)	Rimvydas Bilius	RTD	6 (10)	1995-07-04	Thiais, France	
55	Win	47–5–2 (1)	Oleg Marchenko	UD	12 (12)	1995-02-14	Thiais, France	Retained European lightweight title
54	Win	46–5–2 (1)	Racheed Lawal	TKO	9 (12)	1994-12-04	Palais Omnisports de Thiais, Thiais, France	Won European lightweight title
53	Loss	45–5–2 (1)	Miguel Ángel González	TKO	5 (12)	1994-03-29	Palais Marcel Cerdan, Levallois-Perret, France	For WBC lightweight title
52	Win	45–4–2 (1)	Angel Mona	TKO	9 (12)	1993-10-05	Dijon, France	Retained European lightweight title
51	Win	44–4–2 (1)	Carl Crook	KO	8 (12)	1993-04-29	Levallois-Perret, France	Retained European lightweight title
50	Win	43–4–2 (1)	Antonio Renzo	TKO	3 (12)	1993-01-28	Levallois-Perret, France	Retained European lightweight title
49	Win	42–4–2 (1)	Paul Burke	UD	12 (12)	1992-11-17	Palais Marcel Cerdan, Levallois-Perret, France	Retained European lightweight title
48	Win	41–4–2 (1)	Angel Mona	PTS	12 (12)	1992-08-14	Ajaccio, France	Retained European lightweight title
47	Win	40–4–2 (1)	Stefano Cassi	RTD	3 (12)	1992-05-28	Creil, France	Retained European lightweight title
46	Win	39–4–2 (1)	Antonio Renzo	TKO	9 (12)	1992-03-27	Creil, France	Won European lightweight title
45	Win	38–4–2 (1)	Jeff Roberts	KO	5 (8)	1992-01-10	Salle des sports Maurice Piot, Vitrolles, France	
44	Win	37–4–2 (1)	Danilo Cabrera	TKO	7 (8)	1991-12-12	Massy, France	
43	Win	36–4–2 (1)	Angel Mona	TKO	1 (10)	1991-05-31	Échirolles, France	Won French lightweight title
42	Win	35–4–2 (1)	Christian Merle	KO	10 (10)	1991-04-12	Salle du Cosec, Clermont-Ferrand, France	
41	Win	34–4–2 (1)	Abdelak Lahmeri	TKO	7 (8)	1991-03-01	Aix-en-Provence, France	
40	Loss	33–4–2 (1)	Christian Merle	UD	10 (10)	1990-03-10	Clermont-Ferrand, France	
39	Win	33–3–2 (1)	Julio Cesar Miranda	PTS	10 (10)	1989-10-07	Bordeaux, France	
38	Win	32–3–2 (1)	Jesus Quinones	KO	2 (?)	1989-04-10	Nogent-sur-Marne, France	
37	Loss	31–3–2 (1)	Lofti Ben Sayel	KO	8 (8)	1988-11-14	Pavillon Baltard, Nogent-sur-Marne, France	
36	Win	31–2–2 (1)	Jose Rojas	KO	3 (?)	1988-09-26	Pavillon Baltard, Nogent-sur-Marne, France	
35	Win	30–2–2 (1)	Refugio Alvarado	TKO	5 (?)	1988-05-26	Paris, France	
34	Win	29–2–2 (1)	Angel Luis Garcia	KO	3 (8)	1988-03-12	Stade de Levallois, Levallois-Perret, France	
33	NC	28–2–2 (1)	Angel Luis Garcia	NC	2 (10)	1988-02-27	Roberto Clemente Coliseum, San Juan, Puerto Rico	
32	Win	28–2–2	Chris Silvas	TKO	4 (8)	1987-12-19	Palais Omnisport de Paris-Bercy, Paris, France	
31	Win	27–2–2	Kevin Pritchard	KO	5 (8)	1987-11-06	Salle Sallusse Santoni, Antibes, France	
30	Win	26–2–2	Jose Mosqueda	PTS	8 (8)	1987-10-10	Le Zénith, Paris, France	
29	Win	25–2–2	Sebastian Wilburn	KO	4 (?)	1987-07-12	Sports Complex, Mérignac, France	
28	Win	24–2–2	Arturo Hernandez	KO	5 (?)	1987-06-08	Mérignac, France	
27	Win	23–2–2	Aristides Acevedo	PTS	8 (8)	1987-05-25	Villeurbanne, France	
26	Win	22–2–2	Mario Salazar	KO	2 (?)	1987-05-12	Le Mans, France	
25	Win	21–2–2	Rafael Gandarilla	KO	7 (?)	1987-02-28	Paris, France	
24	Win	20–2–2	Vicente Macias	KO	5 (?)	1987-02-06	Bordeaux, France	
23	Win	19–2–2	Mike Durvan	KO	3 (10)	1986-12-08	Usines Center, Paris, France	
22	Win	18–2–2	Ilaitia Vaka	TKO	6 (10)	1986-06-07	Omni Sports Stadium, Nouméa, New Caledonia	
21	Win	17–2–2	Vicente Jorge	DQ	3 (?)	1986-05-23	Bordeaux, France	
20	Win	16–2–2	Michele Siracusa	RTD	6 (?)	1986-04-05	Bordeaux, France	
19	Win	15–2–2	Rafael Sanchez Munoz	TKO	4 (?)	1986-03-14	Bordeaux, France	
18	Win	14–2–2	Raffaele Paoletti	PTS	8 (8)	1986-02-03	Paris, France	
17	Win	13–2–2	Edgar Castro	PTS	8 (8)	1985-06-01	Parc des Princes, Paris, France	
16	Win	12–2–2	Sanna Kabore	PTS	8 (8)	1985-05-17	Dakar, Senegal	
15	Win	11–2–2	Jesus Bezanilla	KO	1 (?)	1985-03-29	Bordeaux, France	
14	Win	10–2–2	Vicente Macias	PTS	8 (8)	1984-12-07	Bordeaux, France	
13	Win	9–2–2	Dusan Radosavljevic	PTS	6 (6)	1984-06-26	Belgrade, SFR Yugoslavia	
12	Win	8–2–2	Antoine Vivarelli	PTS	6 (6)	1984-04-13	Salle Sallusse Santoni, Antibes, France	
11	Win	7–2–2	Dzavid Mahmutovic	TKO	8 (?)	1984-03-25	Podgorica, SFR Yugoslavia	
10	Loss	6–2–2	Vicente Macias	PTS	8 (8)	1984-03-02	Bayonne, France	
9	Draw	6–1–2	Nihat Er	PTS	8 (8)	1984-01-21	Montargis, France	
8	Loss	6–1–1	Lahcen Oumghar	TKO	3 (?)	1983-11-14	Sportpaleis Ahoy', Rotterdam, Netherlands	
7	Win	6–0–1	Abdel Chahboune	PTS	6 (6)	1983-10-10	Palais des Sports, Paris, France	
6	Draw	5–0–1	Jean Luc Sautreau	PTS	6 (6)	1983-08-06	Dijon, France	
5	Win	5–0	Norbert Alcade	TKO	2 (?)	1983-06-13	Paris, France	
4	Win	4–0	Lexter Boucaud	PTS	6 (6)	1983-03-14	Paris, France	
3	Win	3–0	Tiburce Mondelice	PTS	6 (6)	1983-03-07	Paris, France	
2	Win	2–0	Yannick Blandin	PTS	6 (6)	1983-02-28	Paris, France	
1	Win	1–0	Gilles Beaurain	PTS	6 (6)	1983-01-15	Guise, France	

== Personal life ==
He died at the age of 57 from cancer on 31 August 2020 in Paris, France.

== See also ==
- List of southpaw stance boxers
- List of world lightweight boxing champions

Sporting positions
Regional boxing titles
Preceded by Angel Mona	French lightweight champion May 31, 1991 – March 27, 1992; Won European title	Vacant Title next held by Charles Baou
Preceded by Antonio Renzo	European lightweight champion March 27, 1992 – 1994; Vacated	Vacant Title next held by Racheed Lawal
Preceded by Racheed Lawal	European lightweight champion December 4, 1994 – 1995; Vacated	Vacant Title next held by Angel Mona
World boxing titles
Vacant Title last held by Miguel Ángel González	WBC lightweight champion April 20, 1996 – March 1, 1997	Succeeded by Stevie Johnston
Preceded by Orzubek Nazarov	WBA lightweight champion May 16, 1998 – April 10, 1999	Succeeded by Julien Lorcy
