= Sharmba Mitchell =

American boxer (born 1970)

Personal information
- Nickname: Little Big Man
- Nationality: American
- Born: Sharmba David Mitchell; August 27, 1970 (age 55) Takoma Park, Maryland, U.S.
- Height: 5 ft 7 in (170 cm)
- Weight: Lightweight; Light welterweight; Welterweight

Boxing career
- Reach: 72 in (183 cm)
- Stance: Southpaw

Boxing record
- Total fights: 63
- Wins: 57
- Win by KO: 30
- Losses: 6

Sharmba David Mitchell (/ˈʃɑːrmbeɪ/ SHARM-bay; born August 27, 1970) is an American former professional boxer who competed from 1988 to 2006. He held the WBA light welterweight title from 1998 to 2001, and the IBF interim light welterweight title in 2004.

== Professional career ==
Mitchell began his professional boxing career on September 23, 1988, knocking out Eddie Colón in three rounds at Atlantic City, New Jersey.

He had a mark of 14 wins and no losses with seven knockouts - including victories over former Olympic Games bronze medalist Aristides Acevedo and over Dana Roston - when he met a former or future world champion for the first time inside a ring. On March 8, 1990, he beat the famed former world champion Rafael Limón in Atlantic City by an eight-round unanimous decision.

Mitchell kept on winning, running his record up to 27-0 with sixteen knockouts, including a victory against former world title challenger Miguel Santana. He then fought former world champion Rocky Lockridge on April 22, 1992, winning a ten-round unanimous decision.

Mitchell had recorded a 31-0 record until he lost two fights in a row to begin 1994: one against future world champion Leavander Johnson in eight rounds, then to future two-time world lightweight champion Stevie Johnston in nine rounds. He did not lose another fight in the next seven years.

After six more wins in a row, including one over future world champion Terron Millett, Mitchell fought for the WBC continental Americas light welterweight title in Dallas, Texas on April 11, 1996. He won the title by knocking out Gilberto Floes in the second round.

On May 10, 1997, Mitchell defeated Jose Rafael Barboza by a twelve-round decision in Miami, Florida to win the WBA's Fedelatin belt in the same weight division. After two more victories, he got his first chance at winning a world title.

=== WBA light welterweight champion ===
On October 10, 1998, he beat Moroccan Khalid Rahilou by a twelve-round unanimous decision in Paris, France, becoming the WBA light welterweight champion.

Mitchell retained his world title four times, his last successful defense being against Puerto Rican Felix Flores on September 16, 2000, at Las Vegas. Mitchell was dropped in the first round, but he recovered and edged the challenger by two scores of 116-111 and one of 116-113.

=== First fight with Tszyu ===
After that fight, demand rose for a unification title bout between Mitchell and Kostya Tszyu of Australia, the WBC light welterweight champion.

The highly anticipated match took place in Las Vegas on February 3, 2001. The outcome was controversial, as Mitchell broke his knee early in the fight and he could not continue after round seven. Although Mitchell was not knocked out in a conventional way, this nevertheless counted as a knockout loss in his record.

Mitchell then fought eight bouts, winning each of them, including victories over former world champion Vince Phillips and winning the IBF super lightweight title against Lovemore N'Dou in Atlantic City New Jersey. Defending that title ounce in Manchester England. He also beat and became and the first person to have knocked down Ben Tackie.

=== Rematch with Tszyu ===
Negotiations for a rematch with Tszyu had been taking place long before the fights with the aforementioned rivals. Tszyu, however, had his own health problems, and the fight kept being cancelled. First scheduled for Australia and then for Moscow, the rematch finally took place on November 6, 2004, in Phoenix, Arizona. Mitchell was floored four times in the second bout with Tszyu before being stopped in round three, losing by knockout.

=== Losses to Mayweather and Williams ===
On November 19, 2005, Mitchell was defeated by Floyd Mayweather Jr. in their 147-lbs. non-title bout in Portland, Oregon. Mayweather dropped Mitchell in the third round with a straight right hand to the head, and again dropped him in the sixth with a hook to the body, ending the fight. During his most recent bout - against Paul Williams in Reno, Nevada, on August 19, 2006 - Mitchell was knocked down in the third round, and three times in the fourth round. Referee Richard Steele stopped the bout at 2:57 when Mitchell arose wobbly from the final knockdown. Mitchell retired for good shortly thereafter.

Mitchell finished his professional boxing career of 57 wins and 6 losses, with 30 knockout wins.

== Professional boxing record ==
63 fights	57 wins	6 losses
By knockout	30	6
By decision	27	0

No.	Result	Record	Opponent	Type	Round, time	Date	Location	Notes
63	Loss	57–6	Paul Williams	KO	4 (12), 2:57	Aug 19, 2006	Events Center, Reno, Nevada, U.S.	For WBC–USNBC and WBO–NABO welterweight titles
62	Win	57–5	Jose Luis Cruz	UD	10	May 3, 2006	Big League Dreams, Cathedral City, California, U.S.	
61	Loss	56–5	Floyd Mayweather Jr.	TKO	6 (12), 2:06	Nov 19, 2005	Rose Garden, Portland, Oregon, U.S.	
60	Win	56–4	Chris Smith	TD	5 (12), 0:16	Jun 11, 2005	MCI Center, Washington, D.C., U.S.	Won WBA–NABA welterweight title; Unanimous TD after Mitchell was cut from an accidental head clash
59	Loss	55–4	Kostya Tszyu	TKO	3 (12), 2:48	Nov 6, 2004	Glendale Arena, Phoenix, Arizona, U.S.	For IBF and The Ring light welterweight titles
58	Win	55–3	Moises Pedroza	KO	2 (10), 2:55	Aug 7, 2004	Foxwoods Resort Casino, Ledyard, Connecticut, U.S.	
57	Win	54–3	Michael Stewart	UD	12	Apr 3, 2004	MEN Arena, Manchester, England	Retained IBF interim light welterweight title
56	Win	53–3	Lovemore N'dou	UD	12	Feb 7, 2004	Bally's, Atlantic City, New Jersey, U.S.	Won vacant IBF interim light welterweight title
55	Win	52–3	Ben Tackie	UD	12	May 17, 2003	City Center Pavilion, Reno, Nevada, U.S.	
54	Win	51–3	Carlos Vilches	TKO	4 (12), 2:58	Jan 25, 2003	Bally's, Atlantic City, New Jersey, U.S.	
53	Win	50–3	Vince Phillips	MD	10	Nov 9, 2002	Coca-Cola Bricktown Events Center, Oklahoma City, Oklahoma, U.S.	
52	Win	49–3	Frank Houghtaling	UD	10	Jul 2, 2002	Lincoln Theatre, Washington, D.C., U.S.	
51	Win	48–3	Bernard Harris	UD	10	Mar 28, 2002	DAR Constitution Hall, Washington, D.C., U.S.	
50	Loss	47–3	Kostya Tszyu	RTD	7 (12), 3:00	Feb 3, 2001	Mandalay Bay Events Center, Paradise, Nevada, U.S.	Lost WBA light welterweight title; For WBC light welterweight title
49	Win	47–2	Felix Flores	UD	12	Sep 16, 2000	MGM Grand Garden Arena, Paradise, Nevada, U.S.	Retained WBA light welterweight title
48	Win	46–2	Elio Ortiz	UD	12	Nov 13, 1999	Thomas & Mack Center, Paradise, Nevada, U.S.	Retained WBA light welterweight title
47	Win	45–2	Reggie Green	MD	12	Apr 24, 1999	MCI Center, Washington, D.C., U.S.	Retained WBA light welterweight title
46	Win	44–2	Pedro Saiz	UD	12	Feb 6, 1999	Convention Center, Washington, D.C., U.S.	Retained WBA light welterweight title
45	Win	43–2	Khalid Rahilou	UD	12	Oct 10, 1998	Palais Omnisports, Paris, France	Won WBA light welterweight title
44	Win	42–2	Bobby Elkins	TKO	1 (10), 2:10	Feb 21, 1998	Miccosukee Resort & Gaming, Miami, Florida, U.S.	
43	Win	41–2	Dezi Ford	KO	5	Jul 15, 1997	Nashville, Tennessee, U.S.	
42	Win	40–2	Jose Rafael Barboza	PTS	12	May 10, 1997	Coconut Grove Convention Center, Miami, Florida, U.S.	Won vacant WBA Fedelatin light welterweight title
41	Win	39–2	John Stewart	KO	1	Oct 19, 1996	Show Place Arena, Upper Marlboro, Maryland, U.S.	
40	Win	38–2	Gilberto Flores	KO	2 (12), 1:06	Apr 11, 1996	Dallas, Texas, U.S.	Won vacant WBC Continental Americas light welterweight title
39	Win	37–2	Harold Bennett	TKO	1 (8), 1:40	Feb 10, 1996	MGM Grand Garden Arena, Paradise, Nevada, U.S.	
38	Win	36–2	Allen Osborne	TKO	2	Dec 7, 1995	Show Place Arena, Upper Marlboro, Maryland, U.S.	
37	Win	35–2	James Gatlin	TKO	5	Nov 21, 1995	Convention Center, Washington, D.C., U.S.	
36	Win	34–2	Terron Millett	TKO	1 (8), 2:38	Sep 16, 1995	The Mirage, Paradise, Nevada, U.S.	
35	Win	33–2	Wayne Boudreaux	TKO	5	Mar 23, 1995	The Palace, Auburn Hills, Michigan, U.S.	
34	Win	32–2	Lyndon Walker	KO	2	Oct 22, 1994	Convention Center, Washington, D.C., U.S.	
33	Loss	31–2	Stevie Johnston	TKO	9 (10), 1:02	Jun 21, 1994	MGM Grand Garden Arena, Paradise, Nevada, U.S.	
32	Loss	31–1	Leavander Johnson	KO	8 (12), 1:33	Mar 18, 1994	MGM Grand Garden Arena, Paradise, Nevada, U.S.	Lost NABF lightweight title
31	Win	31–0	Chad Broussard	TKO	1 (12), 2:25	Nov 6, 1993	Caesars Palace, Paradise, Nevada, U.S.	Won vacant NABF lightweight title
30	Win	30–0	Kenny Baysmore	KO	1 (10), 1:44	May 22, 1993	Robert F. Kennedy Memorial Stadium, Washington, D.C., U.S.	
29	Win	29–0	Eric Whitfield	TKO	2 (10), 2:55	Nov 29, 1992	Convention Center, Washington, D.C., U.S.	
28	Win	28–0	Rocky Lockridge	UD	10	Apr 22, 1992	Brendan Byrne Arena, East Rutherford, New Jersey, U.S.	
27	Win	27–0	Gilberto Flores	TKO	5 (10), 1:46	Feb 15, 1992	The Mirage, Paradise, Nevada, U.S.	
26	Win	26–0	Leo Martinez	TKO	1	Jan 14, 1992	Atlantic City, New Jersey, U.S.	
25	Win	25–0	Keeley Thompson	TKO	10 (12), 0:38	Oct 29, 1991	Convention Center, Washington, D.C., U.S.	
24	Win	24–0	Miguel Santana	TKO	3	Jul 23, 1991	Broadway by the Bay Theater, Atlantic City, New Jersey, U.S.	
23	Win	23–0	Darryl Richardson	KO	2 (10), 2:10	Apr 10, 1991	La Fontaine Bleue, Lanham, Maryland, U.S.	
22	Win	22–0	Felix Gonzales	TKO	5 (10), 2:36	Mar 19, 1991	High School, Woodbridge, New Jersey, U.S.	
21	Win	21–0	Kevin Marston	UD	10	Jan 16, 1991	La Fontaine Bleue, Lanham, Maryland, U.S.	
20	Win	20–0	Robert Byrd	RTD	7 (10), 3:00	Nov 1, 1990	Etess Arena, Atlantic City, New Jersey, U.S.	
19	Win	19–0	Rodney Fennell	PTS	6	Sep 7, 1990	UDC Physical Activities Center, Washington, D.C., U.S.	
18	Win	18–0	Freddie Sevilla	TKO	5 (10)	Jul 20, 1990	The Blue Horizon, Philadelphia, Pennsylvania, U.S.	
17	Win	17–0	Eric Podolak	TKO	5 (10)	Jul 3, 1990	Convention Center, Washington, D.C., U.S.	
16	Win	16–0	Nigel Wenton	UD	8	Apr 29, 1990	Circus Maximus Showroom, Atlantic City, New Jersey, U.S.	
15	Win	15–0	Billy Young	UD	10	Apr 3, 1990	The Blue Horizon, Philadelphia, Pennsylvania, U.S.	
14	Win	14–0	Rafael Limón	UD	8	Mar 3, 1990	Trump Plaza Hotel and Casino, Atlantic City, New Jersey, U.S.	
13	Win	13–0	Bobby Brewer	UD	8	Feb 1, 1990	Trump Plaza Hotel and Casino, Atlantic City, New Jersey, U.S.	
12	Win	12–0	Dana Roston	TKO	1 (8), 1:10	Jan 11, 1990	Trump Plaza Hotel and Casino, Atlantic City, New Jersey, U.S.	
11	Win	11–0	Joseph Alexander	UD	8	Nov 16, 1989	Steel Pier, Atlantic City, New Jersey, U.S.	
10	Win	10–0	Juan Torres	TKO	3	Oct 26, 1989	Steel Pier, Atlantic City, New Jersey, U.S.	
9	Win	9–0	Aristides Acevedo	UD	8	Sep 21, 1989	Atlantic City, New Jersey, U.S.	
8	Win	8–0	Perry McQueen	KO	1	Aug 16, 1989	Washington, D.C., U.S.	
7	Win	7–0	Javier Chavez	RTD	2 (4), 3:00	May 23, 1989	Showboat Hotel Casino and Bowling Center, Atlantic City, New Jersey, U.S.	
6	Win	6–0	Verrol Liverpool	PTS	6	Apr 27, 1989	D.C. Armory, Washington, D.C., U.S.	
5	Win	5–0	Thomas Baker	UD	6	Mar 23, 1989	National Guard Armory, Glen Burnie, Maryland, U.S.	
4	Win	4–0	Craig Wills	UD	4	Jan 15, 1989	Circus Maximus Showroom, Atlantic City, New Jersey, U.S.	
3	Win	3–0	Willie Rivera	UD	4	Nov 22, 1988	Steel Pier, Atlantic City, New Jersey, U.S.	
2	Win	2–0	Randy Kearse	TKO	2	Oct 11, 1988	Steel Pier, Atlantic City, New Jersey, U.S.	
1	Win	1–0	Eddie Colon	TKO	3	Sep 23, 1988	Steel Pier, Atlantic City, New Jersey, U.S.	Professional debut

== Awards ==
- 2011: Washington D.C. Lifetime Achievement Award
- 2012: Maryland Sports Hall of Fame inductee

Sporting positions
Regional boxing titles
Vacant Title last held by Rafael Ruelas	NABF lightweight champion November 6, 1993 – March 18, 1994	Succeeded by Leavander Johnson
Vacant Title last held by Scott Walker	WBC Continental Americas light welterweight champion April 11, 1996 – May 1997; Vacated	Vacant Title next held by Antonio Pitalúa
Vacant Title last held by Walter Javier Crucce	WBA Fedelatin light welterweight champion May 10, 1997 – October 1998; Vacated	Vacant Title last held by Elio Ortiz
Preceded by Chris Smith	WBA–NABA welterweight champion June 11, 2005 – November 2005; Vacated	Vacant Title last held by Oscar Díaz
World boxing titles
Preceded by Khalid Rahilou	WBA light welterweight champion October 10, 1998 – February 3, 2001; Lost bid for Unified title	Succeeded by Kostya Tszyu as Unified champion
Vacant Title last held by Zab Judah	IBF light welterweight champion Interim title February 7, 2004 – November 6, 2004; Lost bid for full title	Title discontinued
