= Ben Tackie =

Ghanaian boxer (born 1973)

Personal information
- Nickname: Wonder
- Nationality: Ghanaian
- Born: Benjamin Tackie; 23 July 1973 (age 52) Accra, Ghana
- Height: 5 ft 9 in (175 cm)
- Weight: Welterweight

Boxing career
- Reach: 71 in (180.3 cm)
- Stance: Orthodox

Boxing record
- Total fights: 44
- Wins: 31
- Win by KO: 18
- Losses: 13

Benjamin Tackie (born 23 July 1973) is a Ghanaian former professional boxer and world title challenger. He was known for his excellent chin and ability to throw a high volume of punches. All but one of his losses came via decision.

== Professional career ==
Known as "Wonder", Tackie turned pro in 1994 and won his first 18 fights before losing a decision to Gregorio Vargas in 1999. In 2002, he took on Kostya Tszyu for the unified WBC, WBA and IBF light welterweight titles but lost a decision. He lost his next two fights to Sharmba Mitchell and Ricky Hatton. He lost to Matthew Hatton on 22 September 2008 on the undercard to Ricky Hatton's Light Welterweight title defence in Las Vegas.

Tackie's 10th-round knockout of Robert Garcia was named Ring Magazine Knockout of the Year for 2000.

So far in his 41 pro fights Tackie has been knocked down only once.

== Stalking charge ==
In February 2015, Tackie's stalking conviction was reversed in Bronx county court in New York. The threat communicated "Don't let me use my boxing skills on you" apparently did not rise to the legal requirement to uphold his conviction. http://law.justia.com/cases/new-york/other-courts/2015/2015-ny-slip-op-50117-u.html

== Professional boxing record ==
| 44 fights | 31 wins | 13 losses |
|---|---|---|
| By knockout | 18 | 1 |
| By decision | 13 | 12 |

Key to abbreviations used for results
| DQ | Disqualification | RTD | Corner retirement |
| KO | Knockout | SD | Split decision / split draw |
| MD | Majority decision / majority draw | TD | Technical decision / technical draw |
| NC | No contest | TKO | Technical knockout |
| PTS | Points decision | UD | Unanimous decision / unanimous draw |

Boxing record
| No. | Result | Record | Opponent | Type | Round(s) | Time | Date | Location | Notes |
|---|---|---|---|---|---|---|---|---|---|
| 44 | Loss | 31–13 | (Mexico) Ramón Álvarez | TKO | 4 (10) | 1:52 | 10 Oct 2015 | Arena Ciudad de México, Mexico City, Mexico | |
| 43 | Win | 31–12 | (Ghana) Gabriel Adoku | TKO | 4 (8) | 2:47 | 8 Mar 2014 | City Engineers Yard, Accra, Greater Accra, Ghana | |
| 42 | Loss | 30–12 | (Philippines) Dennis Laurente | UD | 8 | N/a | 12 Mar 2010 | (United States) Gaylord Hotel, Grapevine, Texas, U.S. | |
| 41 | Loss | 30–11 | (United Kingdom) Matthew Hatton | UD | 10 | N/a | 22 Nov 2008 | (United States) MGM Grand Garden Arena, Paradise, Nevada, U.S. | |
| 40 | Loss | 30–10 | (Puerto Rico) Henry Bruseles | SD | 10 | N/a | 11 Apr 2008 | (United States) Tropicana Hotel & Casino, Atlantic City, New Jersey, U.S. | |
| 39 | Loss | 30–9 | (United States) Kendall Holt | MD | 10 | N/a | 7 Feb 2008 | (United States) Hard Rock Hotel and Casino, Las Vegas, Nevada, U.S. | |
| 38 | Loss | 30–8 | (Mexico) Alfonso Gómez | UD | 10 | N/a | 16 Oct 2007 | (United States) Home Depot Center, Carson, California, U.S. | |
| 37 | Loss | 30–7 | (Mexico) Freddy Hernández | UD | 10 | N/a | 1 Jun 2007 | (United States) Cicero Stadium, Cicero, Illinois, U.S. | |
| 36 | Win | 30–6 | (Mexico) Esau Herrera de la Cruz | UD | 10 | N/a | 21 Oct 2006 | (United States) Don Haskins Center, El Paso, Texas, U.S. | |
| 35 | Win | 29–6 | (Puerto Rico) Wilfredo Negrón | TKO | 9 (10) | 0:26 | 15 Jul 2006 | (United States) MGM Grand Garden Arena, Paradise, Nevada, U.S. | |
| 34 | Loss | 28–6 | (Mexico) Juan Lazcano | UD | 10 | N/a | 24 Feb 2006 | (United States) Mandalay Bay Events Center, Paradise, Nevada, U.S. | |
| 33 | Win | 28–5 | (Mexico) Roberto Valenzuela | TD | 6 (8) | 3:00 | 16 Dec 2005 | (United States) Austin Convention Center, Austin, Texas, U.S. | |
| 32 | Win | 27–5 | (United States) Norberto Bravo | MD | 10 | N/a | 23 Sep 2005 | (United States) Lyon Center, Los Angeles, California, U.S. | |
| 31 | Win | 26–5 | (Puerto Rico) Edwin Algarin | UD | 8 | N/a | 27 May 2005 | (United States) Club Cinema, Pompano Beach, Florida, U.S. | |
| 30 | Win | 25–5 | (United States) Jonathan Nelson | TKO | 2 (8) | 1:17 | 4 Dec 2004 | (United States) Mandalay Bay Events Center, Paradise, Nevada, U.S. | |
| 29 | Loss | 24–5 | (United Kingdom) Ricky Hatton | UD | 12 | N/a | 13 Dec 2003 | (United Kingdom) Manchester Arena, Manchester, Greater Manchester, UK | For WBU light welterweight title |
| 28 | Loss | 24–4 | (United States) Sharmba Mitchell | UD | 12 | N/a | 17 May 2003 | (United States) Silver Legacy Resort & Casino, Reno, Nevada, U.S. | IBF light welterweight title eliminator |
| 27 | Loss | 24–3 | (Australia) Kostya Tszyu | UD | 12 | N/a | 18 May 2002 | (United States) Mandalay Bay Events Center, Paradise, Nevada, U.S. | For WBA, WBC, IBF and The Ring undisputed light welterweight title |
| 26 | Win | 24–2 | (Jamaica) Teddy Reid | TKO | 5 (12) | 2:35 | 25 Jan 2002 | (United States) Ramada Plaza Hotel, Rosemont, Illinois, U.S. | Retained NABF light welterweight title |
| 25 | Win | 23–2 | (United States) Ray Oliveira | MD | 12 | N/a | 10 Aug 2001 | (United States) Foxwoods Resort, Mashantucket, Connecticut, U.S. | Won vacant NABF light welterweight title |
| 24 | Win | 22–2 | (United States) Terrell Finger | TKO | 6 (10) | 0:59 | 8 Apr 2001 | (United States) Grand Victoria Casino, Elgin, Illinois, U.S. | |
| 23 | Loss | 21–2 | (Puerto Rico) John John Molina | SD | 10 | N/a | 11 Nov 2000 | (United States) Mandalay Bay Events Center, Paradise, Nevada, U.S. | |
| 22 | Win | 21–1 | (United States) Freddie Pendleton | KO | 1 (10) | 2:29 | 18 Aug 2000 | (United States) Lucky Star Casino, Concho, Oklahoma, U.S. | |
| 21 | Win | 20–1 | (United States) Roberto Garcia | TKO | 10 (10) | 0:35 | 3 Jun 2000 | (United States) MGM Grand Garden Arena, Paradise, Nevada, U.S. | |
| 20 | Win | 19–1 | (United States) Golden Johnson | UD | 10 | N/a | 19 Mar 2000 | (United States) Horseshoe Casino Tunica, Tunica, Mississippi, U.S. | |
| 19 | Loss | 18–1 | (Mexico) Gregorio Vargas | UD | 12 | N/a | 16 Jan 1999 | (United States) MGM Grand Garden Arena, Paradise, Nevada, U.S. | For vacant WBC continental americas lightweight title |
| 18 | Win | 18–0 | (Cuba) Hicklet Lau | UD | 10 | N/a | 13 Nov 1998 | (United States) Miccosukee Indian Gaming Resort, Miami, Florida, U.S. | |
