= Serov =

Serov (Russian: Серов) is a Russian masculine surname, its feminine counterpart is Serova. Notable people with the surname include:

- Aleksander Serov (born 1954), Ukrainian-born Russian popular singer
- Alexander Serov (1820–1871), Russian composer and music critic
- Alexander Serov (cyclist) (born 1982), Russian road and track racing cyclist
- Anatoly Serov (1910–1939), Soviet fighter pilot
- Anna Lidia Vega Serova (born 1968), Cuban writer
- Daria Serova (born 1982), Russian freestyle skier
- Irina Serova (born 1966), Austrian-Soviet badminton player
- Ivan Serov (1905–1990), head of the KGB in 1954–1958 and of the GRU in 1958–1963
- Marina Serova (born 1966), Soviet figure skater
- Roman Serov (b. 1976), Russian-born figure skater competing for Israel
- Valentin Serov (1865–1911), Russian painter
- Valentina Serova (1917–1975), Soviet film and theatre actress
- Valentina Serova (composer) (1846–1924), Russian composer
- Vasili Serov (born 1829-1901), A Russian general participating in the Turkestan campaigns
- Vladimir Serov (footballer) (born 1979), Russian football player
- Vladimir Serov (pilot) (1922–1944), Soviet flying ace
- Yelena Serova (born 1976), Russian cosmonaut

== See also ==
- Serov (town), a town in Sverdlovsk Oblast, Russia
- Serow (disambiguation)
