= List of world light-welterweight boxing champions =

This is a chronological List of World Super Lightweight/Light Welterweight/Junior Welterweight Boxing Champions, as recognized by four of the better-known sanctioning organizations:

- The World Boxing Association (WBA), founded in 1921 as the National Boxing Association (NBA) before renaming itself in 1962;
- The World Boxing Council (WBC), founded in 1963;
- The International Boxing Federation (IBF), founded in 1983;
- The World Boxing Organization (WBO), founded in 1988.

Other major world titles include those handed out by The Ring magazine since 1928 and the New York State Athletic Commission (NYSAC) from 1922 to 1962.

Reign Began	Reign Ended	Champion	Recognition
World Claim
1923-06	1924-04-08	(United States) Paul Doyle	World claim
Lost to Willie Harmon
1925-03-27	1925-08-18	(United States) James Red Herring	NBA claim
Lost to Mushy Callahan; continued to claim title until 1929
1931-04-21	1932-05-20	(United Kingdom) Jack Kid Berg	World claim
Lost to Sammy Fuller
1932-05-20	1933-11-17	(United States) Sammy Fuller	World claim
Lost to Barney Ross
NBA/NYSAC/World
1922-11-22	1926-09-21	(United States) Pinky Mitchell	Undisputed (NBA and possible NYSAC recognition)
The NYSAC may or may not have also recognized Mitchell until August 1925 when he temporarily moved up to welterweight. After this, Willie Harmon claimed the belt until August 1926 when recognition was then apparently given back to Mitchell.
1925-08-14	1926-08 Abandoned	(United States) Willie Harmon	NYSAC (Possible recognition)
1926-09-21	1930-02-18	(United States) Mushy Callahan	Undisputed (NBA/NYSAC)
1930-02-18	1931-04-24	(United Kingdom) Jack Kid Berg	Undisputed
1931-04-24	1932-01-18	(United States) Tony Canzoneri	Undisputed
1932-01-18	1933-02-06 Vacated	(United States) Johnny Jadick	Undisputed/NYSAC
The NBA stopped recognizing the division on 20 September 1932. The NYSAC would later follow suit after Jadick vacated the belt.
1933-02-20	1933-05-21	(Mexico) Battling Shaw	World
1933-05-21	1933-06-23	(United States) Tony Canzoneri	World
1933-06-23	1935-04-15 Vacated	(United States) Barney Ross	World
The NBA and the NYSAC temporarily resumed championship recognition of the division and crowned Tippy Larkin on 29 April 1946 after he defeated Willie Joyce.
1946-04-29	1946-11-05 Vacated	(United States) Tippy Larkin	Undisputed (NBA/NYSAC)
NBA and NYSAC titles remained vacant until Carlos Ortiz defeated Kenny Lane on 12 Jun 1959.
1959-06-12	1960-09-01	(Puerto Rico) Carlos Ortiz	Undisputed (NBA/NYSAC)
1960-09-01	1962-09-14	(Italy) Duilio Loi	Undisputed
1962-09-14	1962-12-15	(United States) Eddie Perkins	Undisputed
1962-12-15	1963-01-24 Retired	(Italy) Duilio Loi	Undisputed

This is a chronological List of World Super Lightweight/Light Welterweight/Junior Welterweight Boxing Champions, as recognized by four of the better-known sanctioning organizations:

Reign Began	Reign Ended	Champion	Recognition
WBC
Title inaugurated
1963-06-15	1965-01-18	(United States) Eddie Perkins	WBC
1965-01-18	1966-04-29	(Venezuela) Carlos Morocho Hernández	WBC
1966-04-29	1967-04-30	(Italy) Sandro Lopopolo	WBC
1967-04-30	1968 Stripped	(Japan) Takeshi Fuji	WBC
1968-12-14	1970-01-31	(Philippines) Pedro Adigue	WBC
1970-01-31	1974-02 Vacated	(Italy) Bruno Arcari	WBC
1974-09-21	1975-07-15	(Spain) Perico Fernandez	WBC
1975-07-15	1976-06-30	(Thailand) Saensak Muangsurin	WBC
1976-06-30	1976-10-29	(Spain) Miguel Velasquez	WBC
1976-10-29	1978-12-30	(Thailand) Saensak Muangsurin	WBC
1978-12-30	1980-02-23	(South Korea) Sang Hyun Kim	WBC
1980-02-23	1982-06-26	(United States) Saoul Mamby	WBC
1982-06-26	1983-05-18	(United States) Leroy Haley	WBC
1983-05-18	1984-01-29	(United States) Bruce Curry	WBC
1984-01-29	1985-08-21	(United States) Billy Costello	WBC
1985-08-21	1986-05-05	(United States) Lonnie Smith	WBC
1986-05-05	1986-07-24	(Mexico) Rene Arredondo	WBC
1986-07-24	1987-07-22	(Japan) Tsuyoshi Hamada	WBC
1987-07-22	1987-11-12	(Mexico) Rene Arredondo	WBC
1987-11-12	1989-05-13	(United States) Roger Mayweather	WBC
1989-05-13	1994-01-29	(Mexico) Julio César Chávez	WBC
1994-01-29	1994-05-07	(United States) Frankie Randall	WBC
1994-05-07	1996-06-07	(Mexico) Julio César Chávez	WBC
1996-06-07	1997-04-12 Vacated	(United States) Oscar De La Hoya	WBC
1999-08-21	2004-01 Stripped	(Australia) Kostya Tszyu	WBC
2004-01-24	2005-06-25	(Canada) Arturo Gatti	WBC
2005-06-25	2006-03-23 Vacated	(United States) Floyd Mayweather Jr.	WBC
2006-09-15	2008-05-10	(United Kingdom) Junior Witter	WBC
2008-05-10	2009-04-28 Vacated	(United States) Timothy Bradley	WBC
2009-08-01	2011-01-29	(United States) Devon Alexander	WBC
2011-01-29	2011-07-29 Stripped	(United States) Timothy Bradley	WBC
2011-09-17	2012-03-23 Stripped	(Mexico) Erik Morales	WBC
2012-03-24	2015-06-11 Vacated	(United States) Danny Garcia	WBC
2015-10-03	2016-07-23	(Ukraine) Viktor Postol	WBC
2016-07-23	2017-10-26 Vacated	(United States) Terence Crawford	WBC
2018-03-17	2021-05-22	(United States) Jose Ramirez	WBC
2021-05-22	2022-07-01 Vacated	(United Kingdom) Josh Taylor	WBC
2022-11-26	2023-12-09	(United States) Regis Prograis	WBC
2023-12-09	2024-06-24	(United States) Devin Haney	WBC
2024-06-24	2025-07-12	(Dominican Republic) Alberto Puello	WBC
2025-07-12	2026-01-10	(Puerto Rico) Subriel Matias	WBC
2026-01-10	Present	(United Kingdom) Dalton Smith	WBC
WBA
Title inaugurated
1962-09-14	1962-12-15	(United States) Eddie Perkins	WBA
1962-12-15	1963-01-24 Retired	(Italy) Duilio Loi	WBA
1963-03-21	1963-06-15	(Philippines) Roberto Cruz	WBA
1963-06-15	1965-01-18	(United States) Eddie Perkins	WBA
1965-01-18	1966-04-29	(Venezuela) Carlos Morocho Hernández	WBA
1966-04-29	1967-04-30	(Italy) Sandro Lopopolo	WBA
1967-04-30	1968-12-12	(Japan) Takeshi Fuji	WBA
1968-12-12	1972-03-10	(Argentina) Nicolino Locche	WBA
1972-03-10	1972-10-28	(Panama) Alfonso Frazer	WBA
1972-10-28	1976-03-06	(Colombia) Antonio Cervantes	WBA
1976-03-06	1977 Stripped	(Puerto Rico) Wilfred Benítez	WBA
1977-06-25	1980-08-02	(Colombia) Antonio Cervantes	WBA
1980-08-02	1983-09-09 Stripped	(United States) Aaron Pryor	WBA
1984-01-22	1984-06-01	(United States) Johnny Bumphus	WBA
1984-06-01	1985-07-21	(United States) Gene Hatcher	WBA
1985-07-21	1986-03-15	(Argentina) Ubaldo Nestor Sacco	WBA
1986-03-15	1987-07-04	(Italy) Patrizio Oliva	WBA
1987-07-04	1990-08-17	(Argentina) Juan Martin Coggi	WBA
1990-08-17	1991-06-14	(United States) Loreto Garza	WBA
1991-06-14	1992-04-10	(Puerto Rico) Edwin Rosario	WBA
1992-04-10	1992-09-09	(Japan) Akinobu Hiranaka	WBA
1992-09-09	1993-01-12	(Philippines) Morris East	WBA
1993-01-12	1994-09-17	(Argentina) Juan Martin Coggi	WBA
1994-09-17	1996-01-13	(United States) Frankie Randall	WBA
1996-01-13	1996-08-16	(Argentina) Juan Martin Coggi	WBA
1996-08-16	1997-01-11	(United States) Frankie Randall	WBA
1997-01-11	1998-10-10	(Morocco) Khalid Rahilou	WBA
1998-10-10	2001-02-03	(United States) Sharmba Mitchell	WBA
2001-02-03	2004 Stripped	(Australia) Kostya Tszyu	WBA Super Champion
2002-05-11	2002-10-19	(Cuba) Diosbelys Hurtado	WBA Regular Champion
2002-10-19	2005-06-25	(Guyana) Vivian Harris	WBA Regular Champion
2005-06-25	2005-11-26	(Colombia) Carlos Maussa	WBA
2005-11-26	2006-05-06 Vacated	(United Kingdom) Ricky Hatton	WBA
2006-09-02	2007-07-21	(France) Souleymane M'Baye	WBA
2007-07-21	2008-03-22	(United Kingdom) Gavin Rees	WBA
2008-03-22	2009-07-18	(Ukraine) Andreas Kotelnik	WBA
2009-07-18	2012-07-14	(United Kingdom) Amir Khan	WBA Super Champion
2011-07-23	2012-07-31 Vacated	(Argentina) Marcos Maidana	WBA Regular Champion
2011-12-10	2012-06-27 Stripped	(United States) Lamont Peterson	WBA Super Champion
2012-07-14	2015-09-11 Vacated	(United States) Danny García	WBA Super Champion
2012-11-30	2014-04-12	(Russia) Khabib Allakhverdiev	WBA Regular Champion
2014-04-12	2015-08-09 Stripped	(United States) Jessie Vargas	WBA Regular Champion
2015-10-03	2016-03-31 Stripped	(United States) Adrien Broner	WBA Super Champion
2016-05-28	2017-04-15	(United Kingdom) Ricky Burns	WBA
2017-04-15	2017-08-19	(Namibia) Julius Indongo	WBA
2017-08-19	2017-10-26 Vacated	(United States) Terence Crawford	WBA
2018-03-10	2019-04-27	(Belarus) Kiryl Relikh	WBA
2019-04-27	2019-10-26	(United States) Regis Prograis	WBA
2019-10-26	2022-05-14 Vacated	(United Kingdom) Josh Taylor	WBA Super Champion
2022-08-20	2023-05-10 Stripped	(Dominican Republic) Alberto Puello	WBA
2023-05-20	2024-03-30	(United States) Rolando Romero	WBA
2024-03-30	2024-08-03	(Mexico) Isaac Cruz	WBA
2024-08-03	2025-03-01	(United States) José Valenzuela	WBA
2025-03-01	Present	(United States) Gary Antuanne Russell	WBA
IBF
Title inaugurated
1984-06-22	1985-03-02 Stripped	(United States) Aaron Pryor	IBF
1986-04-26	1986-10-30	(United States) Gary Hinton	IBF
1986-10-30	1987-03-04	(United States) Joe Manley	IBF
1987-03-04	1987-07-01 Retired	(United Kingdom) Terry Marsh	IBF
1988-02-14	1988-09-03	(United States) James McGirt	IBF
1988-09-03	1990-03-17	(United States) Meldrick Taylor	IBF
1990-03-17	1991-03-18 Vacated	(Mexico) Julio César Chávez	IBF
1991-12-07	1992-07-18	(Colombia) Rafael Pineda	IBF
1992-07-18	1993 Vacated	(United States) Pernell Whitaker	IBF
1993-05-15	1994-02-13	(United States) Charles Murray	IBF
1994-02-13	1995-01-28	(Puerto Rico) Jake Rodriguez	IBF
1995-01-28	1997-05-31	(Australia) Kostya Tszyu	IBF
1997-05-31	1999-02-20	(United States) Vince Phillips	IBF
1999-02-20	2000 Stripped	(United States) Terron Millett	IBF
2000-02-12	2001-11-03	(United States) Zab Judah	IBF
2001-11-03	2005-06-04	(Australia) Kostya Tszyu	IBF
2005-06-04	2006-03-29 Vacated	(United Kingdom) Ricky Hatton	IBF
2006-06-30	2007-01-20	(Colombia) Juan Urango	IBF
2007-01-20	2007-02-09 Vacated	(United Kingdom) Ricky Hatton	IBF
2007-02-04	2007-06-16	(South Africa) Lovemore N'dou	IBF
2007-06-16	2008-09-19 Vacated	(United States) Paul Malignaggi	IBF
2009-01-30	2010-03-06	(Colombia) Juan Urango	IBF
2010-03-06	2010-10-22 Stripped	(United States) Devon Alexander	IBF
2011-03-05	2011-07-23	(United States) Zab Judah	IBF
2011-07-23	2011-12-10	(United Kingdom) Amir Khan	IBF
2011-12-10	2015-04-11 Stripped	(United States) Lamont Peterson	IBF
2015-07-18	2015-11-04	(Argentina) Cesar Cuenca	IBF
2015-11-04	2016-12-03	(Russia) Eduard Troyanovsky	IBF
2016-12-03	2017-08-19	(Namibia) Julius Indongo	IBF
2017-08-19	2017–08–30 Vacated	(United States) Terence Crawford	IBF
2017-11-04	2018-03-10	(Russia) Sergey Lipinets	IBF
2018-03-10	2018-04-18 Vacated	(United States) Mikey Garcia	IBF
2018-10-27	2019-05-18	(Belarus) Ivan Baranchyk	IBF
2019-05-18	2022-08-24 Vacated	(United Kingdom) Josh Taylor	IBF
2023-02-25	2024-06-15	(Puerto Rico) Subriel Matías	IBF
2024-06-15	2024-12-07	(Australia) Liam Paro	IBF
2024-12-07	2026-04-20 Vacated	(United States) Richardson Hitchins	IBF
WBO
Title inaugurated
1989-03-06	1991-02-23	(Puerto Rico) Héctor Camacho	WBO
1991-02-23	1991-05-18	(United States) Greg Haugen	WBO
1991-05-18	1992 Vacated	(Puerto Rico) Héctor Camacho	WBO
1992-06-29	1993-06-07	(Mexico) Carlos Gonzalez	WBO
1993-06-07	1994-07-24 Retired	(United States) Zack Padilla	WBO
1995-02-20	1996-03-09	(Puerto Rico) Sammy Fuentes	WBO
1996-03-09	1998-05-29	(Italy) Giovanni Parisi	WBO
1998-05-29	1999-05-15	(Mexico) Carlos Gonzalez	WBO
1999-05-15	2000-07-22	(United States) Randall Bailey	WBO
2000-07-22	2001-06-30 Stripped	(Colombia) Ener Julio	WBO
2001-06-30	2003-07-12	(United States) DeMarcus Corley	WBO
2003-07-12	2004 Vacated	(United States) Zab Judah	WBO
2004-09-11	2006-10-27 Vacated	(Puerto Rico) Miguel Cotto	WBO
2006-11-18	2008-07-05	(Colombia) Ricardo Torres	WBO
2008-07-05	2009-04-04	(United States) Kendall Holt	WBO
2009-04-04	2012-06-09 Vacated	(United States) Timothy Bradley	WBO
2012-06-09	2013-10 Stripped	(Mexico) Juan Manuel Marquez	WBO
2013-10	2013-10-19	(United States) Mike Alvarado	WBO
2013-10-19	2014-06-14	(Russia) Ruslan Provodnikov	WBO
2014-06-14	2014-11-22 Stripped	(United States) Chris Algieri	WBO
2015-04-18	2017-10-26 Vacated	(United States) Terence Crawford	WBO
2018-06-09	2019-07-27	(United States) Maurice Hooker	WBO
2019-07-27	2021-05-22	(United States) Jose Ramirez	WBO
2021-05-22	2023-06-10	(United Kingdom) Josh Taylor	WBO
2023-06-10	2026-01-31	(United States) Teofimo Lopez	WBO
2026-01-31	Present	(United States) Shakur Stevenson	WBO

== See also ==
- List of British world boxing champions
