= Carlos González (boxer, born 1972) =

Mexican boxer

Personal information
- Nickname: Bolillo
- Born: Carlos González Ferrer; 15 June 1972 (age 54) Xochimilco, Mexico
- Height: 5 ft 8 in (173 cm)
- Weight: Light welterweight; Welterweight

Boxing career
- Reach: 72 in (183 cm)
- Stance: Orthodox

Boxing record
- Total fights: 64
- Wins: 55
- Win by KO: 46
- Losses: 8
- Draws: 1

Carlos González Ferrer (born June 15, 1972), is a former boxer from Xochimilco, Mexico, and a former WBO world junior welterweight champion.

== Professional career ==
He began boxing professionally in 1988, and captured the WBO Light Welterweight Title with a TKO victory over Jimmy Paul in 1992. He defended the title three times before losing it to Zack Padilla in 1993. He captured the title again in 1998 with a TKO win over Giovanni Parisi. He lost the belt in his first defense to Randall Bailey by KO in the first round. He retired in 2005 after being TKO'd by Felix Flores.

== Professional boxing record ==
64 fights	55 wins	8 losses
By knockout	46	4
By decision	8	4
By disqualification	1	0
Draws	1	

No.	Result	Record	Opponent	Type	Round, time	Date	Location	Notes
64	Loss	55–8–1	Felix Flores	TKO	8 (12)	2005-05-13	Plaza Hotel & Casino, Downtown Las Vegas, Nevada, U.S.	For vacant WBO Latino welterweight title
63	Loss	55–7–1	Gil Reyes	UD	12 (12)	2005-02-11	Miccosukee Resort & Gaming, Miami, Florida, U.S.	For vacant WBA Fedecentro welterweight title
62	Win	55–6–1	Saúl Duran	SD	10 (10)	2004-11-26	Poliforo Juan Gabriel, Ciudad Juárez, Mexico	
61	Win	54–6–1	Wilmer Gonzalez	TKO	6 (12)	2004-08-20	Centro de Convenciones, Tlalnepantla de Baz, Mexico	Retained WBC FECARBOX welterweight title
60	Win	53–6–1	Anderson Clayton	TKO	3 (12)	2004-05-11	Centro de Convenciones, Tlalnepantla de Baz, Mexico	Won vacant WBC FECARBOX welterweight title
59	Loss	52–6–1	Nelson Estupiñán	TKO	2 (12)	2003-12-05	Commerce Casino, Commerce, California, U.S.	
58	Win	52–5–1	Aladino Alanis	RTD	3 (12)	2003-11-01	Grand Oasis Arena, Cancún, Mexico	Won vacant WBO Latino welterweight title
57	Win	51–5–1	Dumont Welliver	MD	8 (8)	2003-04-12	MGM Grand Garden Arena, Paradise, Nevada, U.S.	
56	Loss	50–5–1	Noel Cortez	UD	10 (10)	2001-09-15	Mexico City, Mexico	
55	Win	50–4–1	Juan Carlos Sánchez	UD	10 (10)	2001-05-25	Discoteca El Alebrije, Acapulco, Mexico	
54	Win	49–4–1	Jose Luis Cruz	TKO	5 (10)	1999-11-20	Paradise Casino, Yuma, Arizona, U.S.	
53	Loss	48–4–1	Randall Bailey	KO	1 (12)	1999-05-15	Jai Alai Fronton, Miami, Florida, U.S.	Lost WBO light-welterweight title
52	Win	48–3–1	Giovanni Parisi	TKO	9 (12)	1998-05-29	Palasport, Pesaro, Italy	Won WBO light-welterweight title
51	Win	47–3–1	Elias Cruz	TKO	4 (?)	1997-07-28	Great Western Forum, Inglewood, California, U.S.	
50	Win	46–3–1	Héctor López	UD	10 (10)	1997-03-17	Great Western Forum, Inglewood, California, U.S.	
49	Loss	45–3–1	Mark Lewis	TD	5 (10)	1996-10-28	Great Western Forum, Inglewood, California, U.S.	
48	Draw	45–2–1	Giovanni Parisi	SD	12 (12)	1996-06-20	Forum, Assago, Italy	For WBO light-welterweight title
47	Win	45–2	Juan Carlos Rodríguez	KO	4 (10)	1996-03-23	Caesars Palace, Paradise, Nevada, U.S.	
46	Win	44–2	Silverio Flores	TKO	1 (10)	1996-02-05	Arrowhead Pond, Anaheim, California, U.S.	
45	Win	43–2	Jose Luis Verdugo	TKO	7 (?)	1995-12-11	Great Western Forum, Inglewood, California, U.S.	
44	Win	42–2	Gerald Reed	TKO	4 (10)	1995-07-24	Great Western Forum, Inglewood, California, U.S.	
43	Win	41–2	Nino Cirilo	KO	1 (10)	1995-04-25	Convention Center, South Padre Island, Texas, U.S.	
42	Win	40–2	Ray Collins	TD	2 (10)	1995-03-06	Great Western Forum, Inglewood, California, U.S.	
41	Win	39–2	Wilberforce Kiggundu	KO	8 (10)	1994-12-12	Great Western Forum, Inglewood, California, U.S.	
40	Loss	38–2	Rene Francisco Herrera	TKO	9 (10)	1994-04-29	Ciudad Juárez, Mexico	
39	Win	38–1	Steve Larrimore	TKO	2 (10)	1994-02-07	Great Western Forum, Inglewood, California, U.S.	
38	Win	37–1	Rod Sequenan	UD	10 (10)	1993-10-11	Great Western Forum, Inglewood, California, U.S.	
37	Loss	36–1	Zack Padilla	UD	12 (12)	1993-06-07	Thomas & Mack Center, Paradise, Nevada, U.S.	Lost WBO light-welterweight title
36	Win	36–0	Tony Baltazar	TKO	1 (12)	1993-03-22	Great Western Forum, Inglewood, California, U.S.	Retained WBO light-welterweight title
35	Win	35–0	Rafael Ortiz	TKO	1 (12)	1992-12-14	Frontón México, Mexico City, Mexico	Retained WBO light-welterweight title
34	Win	34–0	Lorenzo Smith	RTD	6 (12)	1992-11-09	Great Western Forum, Inglewood, California, U.S.	Retained WBO light-welterweight title
33	Win	33–0	José Rodríguez	DQ	2 (?)	1992-08-24	Frontón México, Mexico City, Mexico	
32	Win	32–0	Jimmy Paul	TKO	2 (12)	1992-06-29	Great Western Forum, Inglewood, California, U.S.	Won vacant WBO light-welterweight title
31	Win	31–0	Tim Brooks	UD	10 (10)	1992-05-11	Great Western Forum, Inglewood, California, U.S.	
30	Win	30–0	Cesar Flores	TKO	1 (?)	1992-03-16	Frontón México, Mexico City, Mexico	
29	Win	29–0	Daniel Hernandez	TKO	5 (?)	1992-02-05	Mexico City, Mexico	
28	Win	28–0	Guillermo Cruz	TKO	1 (10)	1991-12-20	Arena Naucalpan, Naucalpan, Mexico	
27	Win	27–0	Alberto Santana Llanes	TKO	1 (?)	1991-11-30	Mexico City, Mexico	
26	Win	26–0	Fernando Rodriguez	TKO	1 (?)	1991-10-19	Mexico City, Mexico	
25	Win	25–0	Jose Mendez	TKO	6 (?)	1991-09-28	Arena Coliseo, Mexico City, Mexico	
24	Win	24–0	Antonio Ortega	KO	5 (?)	1991-06-17	Tijuana, Mexico	
23	Win	23–0	Antonio Ojeda	KO	1 (10)	1991-05-18	Mexico City, Mexico	
22	Win	22–0	Francisco Martinez Laguna	TKO	4 (10)	1991-03-30	Mexico City, Mexico	
21	Win	21–0	Amancio Castro	TKO	1 (?)	1991-03-07	Mexico City, Mexico	
20	Win	20–0	Mario Estrada	KO	1 (?)	1991-01-26	Mexico City, Mexico	
19	Win	19–0	Raul Feregrino	TKO	1 (10)	1990-12-15	Mexico City, Mexico	
18	Win	18–0	Oscar Lopez	PTS	10 (10)	1990-09-30	Plaza de Toros Calafia, Mexicali, Mexico	
17	Win	17–0	Juan Ulloa	TKO	6 (?)	1990-09-05	Mexico City, Mexico	
16	Win	16–0	Felipe Rojas	TKO	1 (?)	1990-07-21	Mexico City, Mexico	
15	Win	15–0	Juan Gerardo Cedillo	TKO	1 (?)	1990-06-23	Mexico City, Mexico	
14	Win	14–0	Gilberto Flores	KO	1 (?)	1990-03-24	Arena México, Mexico City, Mexico	
13	Win	13–0	Alfonso Martinez	TKO	2 (?)	1990-02-10	Mexico City, Mexico	
12	Win	12–0	Juan Lopez	TKO	3 (?)	1989-11-25	Mexico City, Mexico	
11	Win	11–0	Marco Antonio Lopez	TKO	2 (?)	1989-09-23	Mexico City, Mexico	
10	Win	10–0	Alfonso Martinez	KO	1 (?)	1989-08-09	Mexico City, Mexico	
9	Win	9–0	Luis Vera	TKO	2 (?)	1989-06-21	Mexico City, Mexico	
8	Win	8–0	Jaime Lopez	TKO	4 (?)	1989-06-07	Mexico City, Mexico	
7	Win	7–0	Juan Ramirez	TKO	2 (?)	1989-05-13	Mexico City, Mexico	
6	Win	6–0	Leonardo Rosales	TKO	1 (?)	1989-03-25	Arena Coliseo, Mexico City, Mexico	
5	Win	5–0	Enrique Picasso	TKO	1 (?)	1989-01-28	Mexico City, Mexico	
4	Win	4–0	Aaron Zarate	TKO	5 (?)	1988-11-19	Mexico City, Mexico	
3	Win	3–0	Maximino Rosario Llano	KO	3 (?)	1988-10-09	Mexico City, Mexico	
2	Win	2–0	Francisco Paco Garcia	TKO	1 (?)	1988-09-18	Revolution Ice Rink, Mexico City, Mexico	
1	Win	1–0	Alfonso Martinez	KO	1 (?)	1988-07-01	Mexico City, Mexico	

== See also ==
- List of Mexican boxing world champions
- List of world light-welterweight boxing champions

Sporting positions
Regional boxing titles
Vacant Title last held by Sebastián Luján	WBO Latino welterweight champion November 1, 2003 – 2004; Vacated	Vacant Title next held by Henry Bruseles
Vacant Title last held by Ernesto Carmona	WBC FECARBOX welterweight champion May 11, 2004 – 2005; Vacated	Vacant Title next held by Xavier Toliver
World boxing titles
Vacant Title last held by Héctor Camacho	WBO light-welterweight champion June 29, 1992 – June 7, 1993	Succeeded by Zack Padilla
Preceded by Giovanni Parisi	WBO light-welterweight champion May 29, 1998 – May 15, 1999	Succeeded by Randall Bailey
