= Ray Oliveira =

American boxer

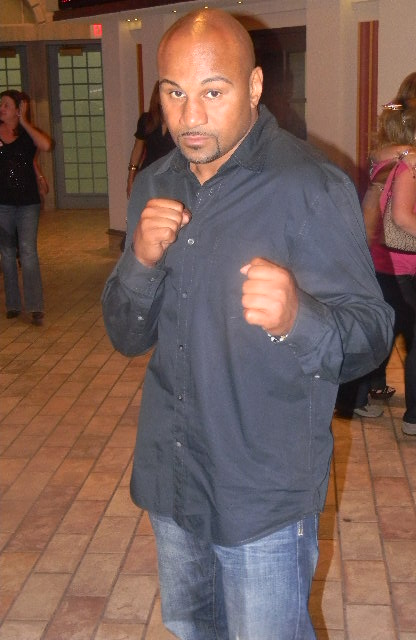
- Ray Oliveira at a fight card at Foxwoods, 2010

Personal information
- Nickname: Sucra
- Born: Raymond Reinaldo Oliveira; October 6, 1968 (age 58) New Bedford, Massachusetts, United States
- Height: 5 ft 11 in (180 cm)
- Weight: Super-lightweight, welterweight

Boxing career
- Reach: 73 in (185 cm)
- Stance: Orthodox

Boxing record
- Total fights: 60
- Wins: 47
- Win by KO: 22
- Losses: 11
- Draws: 2

Raymond Reinaldo Oliveira (born October 6, 1968) is an American former professional boxer, known by the nickname 'Sucra'. He fought for world titles at both super-lightweight and welterweight, winning the International Boxing Union world welterweight title twice, in 2003 and 2004.

== Amateur career ==
Born in New Bedford, Massachusetts, Oliveira was one of 19 children. He started boxing at the age of 11, and went on to have over 300 amateur bouts. Among his achievements as an amateur were five New England Golden Gloves titles in five different weight classes.

== Professional career ==
Oliveira made his professional debut in July 1990 with a second round knockout of Joe Goss. He won his first 13 fights before suffering a majority-decision defeat to Terry Southerland in March 1992.

In December 1993 he challenged Zack Padilla for the WBO world super-lightweight title, losing on points in a fight that broke records for the number of punches thrown and landed, a fate repeated four months later when he challenged for Jake Rodriguez's IBF title.

A string of wins led to a challenge for Charles Murray's NABF title in April 1997. He won by unanimous decision but lost the title in his first defence four months later to Reggie Green. In November 1997 he moved up to welterweight to challenge for Vernon Forrest's WBC Continental Americas title, losing by a wide unanimous decision.

After a win over the previously-unbeaten Vivian Harris in February 2000, in December that year he regained the NABF super-lightweight title, beating former world champion Vince Phillips by majority decision, but again lost it in his first defence to Ben Tackle.

Oliveira moved up to welterweight again and challenged for Lorenzo Smith's IBU world title in January 2003. Oliveira took the belt after Smith retired in the sixth round. He lost the title in May that year to Elio Ortiz, but regained it October 2004 with a unanimous points win over Hicklet Lau. Two months later he unsuccessfully challenged Ricky Hatton for the WBU super-lightweight world title in a pay-per-view fight at the ExCel Arena in London, Hatton winning by a tenth-round knockout, the first time in Oliveira's career that he had been stopped. Oliveira fought only once more – an eighth-round stoppage loss to Emanuel Augustus; He began experiencing serious pains at the base of his skull midway through the fight, as well as loss of feeling in his arms and shaking, and the referee stopped the bout after noticing that Augustus was avoiding throwing punches to Oliveira's head.

Oliveira had planned to make a comeback against Joey Spina on October 2, 2010, but despite being passed fit to fight by one neurologist, another appointed by the Mashantucket Pequot Tribal Nation Gaming Commission refused to allow him to fight, and Oliveira never fought again.

After retiring as a fighter, Oliveira trained boxers at his gym. Oliveira's son, Ray Jr. is also a professional boxer.
