= Charles Murray (boxer) =

American boxer (born 1968)

Personal information
- Nickname: The Natural
- Nationality: American
- Born: August 18, 1968 (age 57) Rochester, New York, U.S.
- Height: 5 ft 10 in (178 cm)
- Weight: Light welterweight

Boxing career
- Reach: 74 in (188 cm)
- Stance: Orthodox

Boxing record
- Total fights: 53
- Wins: 44
- Win by KO: 26
- Losses: 9

Charles Murray (born August 18, 1968 in Rochester, New York, United States) is a retired American boxer who boxed at light welterweight.

== Career ==
Murray was the 1987 United States Amateur Lightweight champion. Known as "The Natural", Murray turned pro in 1989 & compiled a record of 20-0 before being upset by veteran Terrence Alli. He would rebound from the loss & go on to win the vacant IBF light welterweight title with a decision win over Rodney Moore in 1993. He defended the title twice before losing it in 1994 to Jake Rodriguez via a majority decision. After the loss to Rodriguez, Murray quickly drifted from championship status to journeyman. He never challenged for a major title again and hasn't fought since 2004.

== Professional boxing record ==
53 fights	44 wins	9 losses
By knockout	26	2
By decision	18	7

No.	Result	Record	Opponent	Type	Round, time	Date	Location	Notes
53	Loss	44–9	Darien Ford	UD	6 (6)	2004-07-28	Frontier Field, Rochester, New York, U.S.	
52	Loss	44–8	Robert Frazier	UD	10 (10)	2003-04-17	Blue Cross Arena, Rochester, New York, U.S.	
51	Loss	44–7	Alfredo Cuevas	TKO	7 (10)	2002-04-19	Black Orchid Theatre, Chicago, Illinois, U.S.	
50	Loss	44–6	Larry Marks	UD	10 (10)	2000-11-24	JFK High School, Paterson, New Jersey, U.S.	
49	Win	44–5	Gary Richardson	TKO	4 (10)	2000-09-28	ESL Center, Rochester, New York, U.S.	
48	Win	43–5	Samuel Harvey	TKO	8 (10)	2000-05-11	ESL Center, Rochester, New York, U.S.	
47	Win	42–5	Ed Griffin	UD	10 (10)	1999-04-30	Turning Stone Resort Casino, Verona, New York, U.S.	
46	Win	41–5	Rick Edson	KO	1 (8)	1998-10-01	Robert Treat Hotel, Newark, New Jersey, U.S.	
45	Loss	40–5	Alfonso Sanchez	TKO	3 (10)	1997-09-19	Ballys Park Place, Atlantic City, New Jersey, U.S.	
44	Win	40–4	Israel Cardona	SD	10 (10)	1997-05-25	The Roxy, Boston, Massachusetts, U.S.	
43	Loss	39–4	Ray Oliveira	UD	12 (12)	1997-04-15	South Mountain Arena, West Orange, New Jersey, U.S.	Lost NABF light welterweight title
42	Win	39–3	Livingstone Bramble	UD	10 (10)	1997-03-01	Convention Center, Atlantic City, New Jersey, U.S.	
41	Win	38–3	Benji Singleton	TKO	5 (10)	1996-09-25	Robert Treat Hotel, Newark, New Jersey, U.S.	
40	Win	37–3	Jake Rodríguez	TKO	7 (12)	1996-06-25	War Memorial Auditorium, Rochester, New York, U.S.	Retained NABF light welterweight title
39	Win	36–3	Tony Lopez	UD	12 (12)	1996-03-26	Blue Cross Arena, Rochester, New York, U.S.	Retained NABF light welterweight title
38	Win	35–3	Reggie Green	TKO	2 (12)	1995-10-10	Blue Cross Arena, Rochester, New York, U.S.	Won vacant NABF light welterweight title
37	Win	34–3	Fitz Vanderpool	KO	6 (10)	1995-07-15	Silver Stadium, Rochester, New York, U.S.	
36	Win	33–3	Jimmy Deoria	UD	10 (10)	1995-02-11	War Memorial Auditorium, Rochester, New York, U.S.	
35	Loss	32–3	Ray Oliveira	UD	10 (10)	1994-10-05	Merv Griffin's Resorts, Atlantic City, New Jersey, U.S.	
34	Win	32–2	Lyndon Walker	UD	10 (10)	1994-07-28	Convention Center, Atlantic City, New Jersey, U.S.	
33	Loss	31–2	Jake Rodríguez	MD	12 (12)	1994-02-13	Ballys Park Place, Atlantic City, New Jersey, U.S.	Lost IBF light welterweight title
32	Win	31–1	Courtney Hooper	RTD	5 (12)	1993-11-19	Convention Center, Atlantic City, New Jersey, U.S.	Retained IBF light welterweight title
31	Win	30–1	Juan Laporte	UD	12 (12)	1993-07-24	Showboat Hotel and Casino, Las Vegas, Nevada, U.S.	Retained IBF light welterweight title
30	Win	29–1	Rodney Moore	UD	12 (12)	1993-05-15	Trump Castle, Atlantic City, New Jersey, U.S.	Won IBF light welterweight title
29	Win	28–1	Tony Martin	UD	10 (10)	1993-04-08	Resorts Casino Hotel, Atlantic City, New Jersey, U.S.	
28	Win	27–1	Juan Ramon Cruz	KO	2 (?)	1992-12-05	Trump Taj Mahal, Atlantic City, New Jersey, U.S.	
27	Win	26–1	Jerry Smith	TKO	5 (10)	1992-09-11	Atlantis Hotel & Casino, Atlantic City, New Jersey, U.S.	
26	Win	25–1	Sammy Fuentes	UD	10 (10)	1992-07-16	Trump Taj Mahal, Atlantic City, New Jersey, U.S.	
25	Win	24–1	Alberto Alcaraz	KO	9 (10)	1992-02-08	Trump Taj Mahal, Atlantic City, New Jersey, U.S.	
24	Win	23–1	Livingstone Bramble	UD	10 (10)	Dec 13, 1991	Convention Center, Atlantic City, New Jersey, U.S.	
23	Win	22–1	Manuel Salas	TKO	3 (10)	1991-09-25	Waterloo Village, Stanhope, New Jersey, U.S.	
22	Win	21–1	Carlos Bates	KO	1 (10)	1991-07-25	Trump Taj Mahal, Atlantic City, New Jersey, U.S.	
21	Loss	20–1	Terrence Alli	SD	12 (12)	1991-05-12	War Memorial Auditorium, Rochester, New York, U.S.	For NABF light welterweight title
20	Win	20–0	Bernard Gray	TKO	6 (10)	1991-04-04	War Memorial Auditorium, Rochester, New York, U.S.	
19	Win	19–0	David Taylor	UD	12 (12)	1991-01-13	Trump Taj Mahal, Atlantic City, New Jersey, U.S.	Retained USBA light welterweight title
18	Win	18–0	Micky Ward	UD	12 (12)	1990-10-18	War Memorial Auditorium, Rochester, New York, U.S.	Won vacant USBA light welterweight title
17	Win	17–0	Salvador Villa	KO	1 (8)	1990-08-18	Bally's, Paradise, Nevada, U.S.	
16	Win	16–0	Alfredo Rojas	KO	4 (10)	1990-07-15	Tropicana Hotel & Casino, Atlantic City, New Jersey, U.S.	
15	Win	15–0	Robert Guy	TKO	7 (10)	1990-05-31	War Memorial Auditorium, Rochester, New York, U.S.	
14	Win	14–0	Elvis Perez	TKO	3 (10)	1990-05-03	Quality Inn Hotel, Newark, New Jersey, New Jersey, U.S.	
13	Win	13–0	Clarence Coleman	KO	1 (8)	1990-03-16	Essex County College, Newark, New Jersey, U.S.	
12	Win	12–0	Arturo Lozano	KO	3 (6)	1990-03-02	Hacienda, Paradise, Nevada, U.S.	
11	Win	11–0	Charles Duffy	UD	6 (6)	1990-02-18	Resorts Casino Hotel, Atlantic City, New Jersey, U.S.	
10	Win	10–0	Howard Stewart	UD	8 (8)	1989-11-14	South Mountain Arena, West Orange, New Jersey, U.S.	
9	Win	9–0	Francisco Mesquita Pereira	TKO	6 (8)	1989-10-20	Resorts Casino Hotel, Atlantic City, New Jersey, U.S.	
8	Win	8–0	Dwayne Peterson	UD	4 (4)	1989-09-12	South Mountain Arena, West Orange, New Jersey, U.S.	
7	Win	7–0	Joseph Alexander	UD	6 (6)	1989-08-15	South Mountain Arena, West Orange, New Jersey, U.S.	
6	Win	6–0	Frank Vasquez	KO	2 (6)	1989-07-16	Harrah's, Atlantic City, New Jersey, U.S.	
5	Win	5–0	Troy Smith	TKO	3 (4)	1989-06-20	Resorts Casino Hotel, Atlantic City, New Jersey, U.S.	
4	Win	4–0	David Levi	UD	4 (4)	1989-05-16	Tyndall Armory, Indianapolis, Indiana, U.S.	
3	Win	3–0	Jose Luis Sanchez	TKO	1 (4)	1989-04-25	Showboat Hotel and Casino, Las Vegas, Nevada, U.S.	
2	Win	2–0	Benjamin Quintero	TKO	2 (4)	1989-03-25	Hilton Hotel, Winchester, Nevada, U.S.	
1	Win	1–0	Martin Vargas	TKO	4 (4)	1989-02-28	Showboat Hotel and Casino, Las Vegas, Nevada, U.S.	

== Personal life ==
Murray has six children, Marquis Rashaad, Kennedy B., Tehilyah Lyric, Chase “Prince”, Kendrick, and Ava. Murray was married on August 16, 2008, in addition a step-son Nyles Goodwin.

== Boxing trainer ==
Murray now trains boxers, and has trained Jerson Ravelo amongst other professional fighters.

== See also ==
- List of world light-welterweight boxing champions

Sporting positions
Amateur boxing titles
Previous: Vince Phillips	U.S. lightweight champion 1987	Next: Romallis Ellis
Regional boxing titles
Vacant Title last held by Loreto Garza	USBA light welterweight champion October 18, 1990 – 1991; Vacated	Vacant Title next held by Darryl Tyson
Vacant Title last held by Jaime Balboa	NABF light welterweight champion October 10, 1995 – April 15, 1997	Succeeded by Ray Oliveira
World boxing titles
Vacant Title last held by Pernell Whitaker	IBF light welterweight champion May 15, 1993 – February 13, 1994	Succeeded by Jake Rodríguez
