= Gil Reyes (boxer) =

American boxer

Gilberto Reyes (born February 19, 1981, in Lawrence, Massachusetts) is a professional boxer.

Reyes, whose nickname is "Sugar", fights out of Miami, Florida. He has been featured numerous times on ESPN2 and Telemundo. In February 2005, Reyes beat Carlos González for the vacant WBA Fedecentro Title. He lost the title less than a year later in a 7th-round knockout by Cosme Rivera.

In his first fight of 2007, in the Miguel Cotto-Oktay Urkal undercard & having lost 2 straight being The fifth fight of the evening which also was a short one when Cotto's sparring partner Gilberto Reyes (18–5–1, 11 KOs) suffered a broken jaw in the first round of his bout against Carlos de la Cruz (9–6, 9 KOs). Reyes appeared to win the first round but did not come out for the second.

As of March 2007, his record is 18–5 with 11 KOs.

Preceded by Rico Tan; Vacated	WBA Fedecentro Welterweight Title; Feb 11, 2005–Mar 24, 2006	Succeeded by Cosme Rivera
