= Sammy Fuentes =

Puerto Rican boxer

Personal information
- Nickname: Mangani
- Born: February 18, 1964 (age 62) Loíza, Puerto Rico
- Height: 5 ft 7 in (170 cm)
- Weight: Light welterweight

Boxing career
- Reach: 70 in (178 cm)
- Stance: Orthodox

Boxing record
- Total fights: 54
- Wins: 34
- Win by KO: 28
- Losses: 18
- Draws: 2
Medal record
Men's Boxing
Representing Puerto Rico
Central American and Caribbean Games
Silver medal – second place	1982 Havana	Featherweight

Sammy Fuentes (born February 18, 1964) in Loíza, Puerto Rico is a retired Puerto Rican boxer.

== Professional career ==
Fuentes turned professional in 1982 & compiled a record of 21–6–1 before facing Julio César Chávez for the WBC light-welterweight title, he would lose via tenth round stoppage. On February 20, 1995, he defeated Fidel Avendano to win the WBO light-welterweight title. Fuentes defended the title once against Hector Lopez before losing it to Giovanni Parisi.

== Professional boxing record ==
54 fights	34 wins	18 losses
By knockout	28	11
By decision	6	6
By disqualification	0	1
Draws	2	

No.	Result	Record	Opponent	Type	Round, time	Date	Location	Notes
54	Loss	34–18–2	José Luis López	TKO	2 (12)	1998-05-09	ARCO Arena, Sacramento, California, U.S.	
53	Loss	34–17–2	Frank Olsen	UD	10 (10)	1998-03-20	Vejlby-Risskov Hallen, Aarhus, Denmark	
52	Draw	34–16–2	Antonio Rivera	PTS	10 (10)	1997-10-25	San Juan, Puerto Rico	
51	Loss	34–16–1	Santos Cardona	TKO	7 (?)	1997-05-31	Coliseo Tomás Dones, Fajardo, Puerto Rico	
50	Loss	34–15–1	Jaime Balboa	RTD	6 (10)	1997-03-22	Condado, Puerto Rico	
49	Win	34–14–1	Rene Valdez	PTS	10 (10)	1997-01-18	Condado, Puerto Rico	
48	Loss	33–14–1	Giovanni Parisi	TKO	8 (12)	1996-03-09	PalaLido, Milan, Italy	Lost WBO light-welterweight title
47	Win	33–13–1	Marco Antonio Lizarraga	KO	4 (10)	1995-12-11	Great Western Forum, Inglewood, California, U.S.	
46	Win	32–13–1	Juan Soberanes	RTD	4 (10)	1995-10-23	Great Western Forum, Inglewood, California, U.S.	
45	Win	31–13–1	Héctor López	SD	12 (12)	1995-06-10	Caesars Palace, Paradise, Nevada, U.S.	Retained WBO light-welterweight title
44	Win	30–13–1	Fidel Avendano	TKO	2 (12)	1995-02-20	Great Western Forum, Inglewood, California, U.S.	Won vacant WBO light-welterweight title
43	Win	29–13–1	Daniel Hernandez	RTD	6 (10)	1994-12-03	Caesars Palace, Paradise, Nevada, U.S.	
42	Win	28–13–1	David Ojeda	KO	5 (12)	1994-11-07	Great Western Forum, Inglewood, California, U.S.	
41	Win	27–13–1	Andreas Panayi	TKO	4 (12)	1994-09-17	Leisure Centre, Crawley, England, U.K.	
40	Win	26–13–1	Gilberto Flores	KO	1 (10)	1994-08-15	Great Western Forum, Inglewood, California, U.S.	
39	Loss	25–13–1	Vyacheslav Yanovskiy	UD	10 (10)	1994-05-27	Club Neva, Saint Petersburg, Russia	
38	Win	25–12–1	Charlie Brown	KO	2 (10)	1993-07-09	Nouméa, New Caledonia	
37	Win	24–12–1	Charles Baou	TKO	5 (10)	1993-05-15	Nouméa, New Caledonia	
36	Loss	23–12–1	Ángel Hernández	SD	10 (10)	1993-03-19	Isla Verde, Puerto Rico	
35	Loss	23–11–1	Kostya Tszyu	TKO	1 (10)	1992-11-13	Festival Hall, Melbourne, Australia	
34	Loss	23–10–1	Charles Murray	UD	10 (10)	1992-07-16	Trump Taj Mahal, Atlantic City, New Jersey, U.S.	
33	Win	23–9–1	Marco Antonio Lizarraga	KO	7 (10)	1992-06-01	Great Western Forum, Inglewood, California, U.S.	
32	Win	22–9–1	Liasu Braimoh	KO	5 (?)	1992-01-27	Great Western Forum, Inglewood, California, U.S.	
31	Loss	21–9–1	David Kamau	UD	10 (10)	1991-11-04	Great Western Forum, Inglewood, California, U.S.	
30	Loss	21–8–1	Rodney Moore	TKO	2 (10)	1991-06-04	The Blue Horizon, Philadelphia, Pennsylvania, U.S.	
29	Loss	21–7–1	Julio César Chávez	RTD	10 (12)	1989-11-18	Caesars Palace, Paradise, Nevada, U.S.	For WBC light-welterweight title
28	Win	21–6–1	Rodolfo Aguilar	UD	12 (12)	1989-08-14	Great Western Forum, Inglewood, California, U.S.	Won vacant WBC Continental Americas light-welterweight title
27	Draw	20–6–1	Rodolfo Aguilar	MD	12 (12)	1989-05-15	Great Western Forum, Inglewood, California, U.S.	
26	Win	20–6	John Montes	KO	7 (10)	1989-02-28	Great Western Forum, Inglewood, California, U.S.	
25	Win	19–6	Santos Cardona	TKO	2 (10)	1989-01-09	Great Western Forum, Inglewood, California, U.S.	
24	Win	18–6	Vincent Releford	TKO	2 (10)	1988-10-05	Great Western Forum, Inglewood, California, U.S.	
23	Win	17–6	Frank Smith	KO	4 (?)	1988-04-15	Saint Thomas, U.S. Virgin Islands	
22	Loss	16–6	Freddie Pendleton	TKO	1 (10)	1988-02-12	Resorts Casino Hotel, Atlantic City, New Jersey, U.S.	
21	Win	16–5	Tony Martin	TKO	5 (10)	1987-12-09	Harrah's Marina Resort, Atlantic City, New Jersey, U.S.	
20	Win	15–5	Nick Parker	TKO	6 (10)	1987-06-25	Caribe Hilton Hotel, San Juan, Puerto Rico	
19	Win	14–5	Jerome Spotsville	TKO	1 (8)	1987-04-18	Caribe Hilton Hotel, San Juan, Puerto Rico	
18	Loss	13–5	Roger Mayweather	RTD	9 (12)	1986-11-28	Trump Casino Hotel, Atlantic City, New Jersey, U.S.	For vacant WBC Continental Americas lightweight title
17	Loss	13–4	Frankie Randall	TKO	2 (10)	1986-05-30	Trump Casino Hotel, Atlantic City, New Jersey, U.S.	
16	Loss	13–3	Frankie Warren	SD	10 (10)	1986-04-06	Memorial Coliseum, Corpus Christi, Texas, U.S.	
15	Win	13–2	Marvin Garris	TKO	5 (10)	1986-02-14	Resorts Casino Hotel, Atlantic City, New Jersey, U.S.	
14	Win	12–2	Ali Kareem Muhammad	TKO	8 (10)	1986-01-10	Resorts Casino Hotel, Atlantic City, New Jersey, U.S.	
13	Win	11–2	Roberto Juarez	TKO	8 (10)	1985-11-13	Showboat Hotel and Casino, Las Vegas, Nevada, U.S.	
12	Win	10–2	Harry Arroyo	KO	7 (10)	1985-10-09	Trump Casino Hotel, Atlantic City, New Jersey, U.S.	
11	Win	9–2	Othal Dixon	MD	10 (10)	1985-06-19	Atlantis Hotel & Casino, Atlantic City, New Jersey, U.S.	
10	Win	8–2	Cirilo Morell	TKO	2 (6)	1985-03-25	Felt Forum, New York City, New York, U.S.	
9	Win	7–2	Jocko King	UD	6 (6)	1985-02-21	Resorts Casino Hotel, Atlantic City, New Jersey, U.S.	
8	Win	6–2	Roberto Ortiz	KO	8 (?)	1984-09-01	Carolina, Puerto Rico	
7	Loss	5–2	Fitzroy Davidson	DQ	7 (?)	1983-12-16	Port of Spain, Trinidad and Tobago	
6	Win	5–1	Angus Alleyne	KO	1 (?)	1983-11-11	Port of Spain, Trinidad and Tobago	
5	Loss	4–1	Juan Nazario	KO	5 (?)	1983-08-18	Trujillo Alto, Puerto Rico	
4	Win	4–0	Edwin Rodriguez	KO	2 (?)	1983-04-16	Trujillo Alto, Puerto Rico	
3	Win	3–0	Victor Fontanez	KO	2 (?)	1983-03-24	Trujillo Alto, Puerto Rico	
2	Win	2–0	Roberto Ortiz	PTS	6 (6)	1983-02-12	Canóvanas, Puerto Rico	
1	Win	1–0	Victor Aponte	KO	3 (4)	1982-11-20	Aguadilla, Puerto Rico	

== See also ==
- Boxing in Puerto Rico
- List of Puerto Rican boxing world champions
- List of world light-welterweight boxing champions

Sporting positions
Regional boxing titles
Vacant Title last held by Loreto Garza	WBC Continental Americas light-welterweight champion August 14, 1989 – August, 1989; Vacated	Vacant Title next held by Mike Johnson
World boxing titles
Vacant Title last held by Zack Padilla	WBO light-welterweight champion February 20, 1995 – March 9, 1996	Succeeded by Giovanni Parisi
