= Félix Trinidad vs. Pernell Whitaker =

The Big Picture
- Date: February 20, 1999
- Venue: Madison Square Garden, New York, New York, U.S.
- Title(s) on the line: IBF welterweight title

Tale of the tape
Boxer	Félix Trinidad	Pernell Whitaker
Nickname	Tito	Sweet Pea
Hometown	San Juan, Puerto Rico	Norfolk, Virginia, U.S.
Purse	$4,500,000	$2,500,000
Pre-fight record	33–0 (29 KO)	40–2–1 (1) (17 KO)
Age	26 years, 1 month	35 years, 1 month
Height	5 ft 11 in (180 cm)	5 ft 6 in (168 cm)
Weight	147 lb (67 kg)	147 lb (67 kg)
Style	Orthodox	Southpaw
Recognition	IBF; Welterweight Champion; The Ring pound-for-pound No. 4 ranked fighter	4-division world champion

Result
- Trinidad wins via unanimous decision (118–109, 118–109, 117–110)

Félix Trinidad vs. Pernell Whitaker, billed as The Big Picture, was a professional boxing match contested on February 20, 1999, for the IBF welterweight title.

== Background ==
A fight between Trinidad and Whitaker had been in the works for several years. In 1995, both fighters had appeared in a doubleheader event billed as Collision Course in which IBF welterweight champion Trinidad would defeat his mandatory challenger Larry Barnes, while Whitaker, then the WBC welterweight champion, would defeat his mandatory challenger Jake Rodriguez. Following their victories, initial plans called for a unification bout in which both fighters' titles would be on the line with both fighters expressing hopes for the fight to happen the following year in 1996 during the post-fight press conference. Whitaker had begun training for his expected fight against Trinidad in April 1996, but the following month, negotiations between Whitaker's promoter Dino Duva and Trinidad's promoter Don King had reached an impasse largely due to a dispute between HBO, who had an exclusive contract with Whitaker, and Showtime, who usually broadcast fights featuring King's fighters, and the fight was called off.

In 1997, Whitaker's career would begin to take a downward spiral. After losing his WBC welterweight title to Oscar De La Hoya in April, Whitaker met Andrey Pestryayev, the WBA's number-one ranked welterweight contender, in an "elimination' bout to determine who would next face WBA welterweight champion Ike Quartey. Though Whitaker originally defeated Pestryayev to gain the title match against Quartey the following April, a post-fight drug test revealed that he had tested positive for cocaine, causing his victory to be overturned and he was issued a six-month suspension as a result. Whitaker's ban was lifted in February 1998 and he was initially allowed to continue on with his title fight against Quartey, but when he failed another drug test two weeks later, the Quartey fight was cancelled and he was sent to a drug rehabilitation center. Trinidad would also run into trouble of his own which led to a 10-month absence from the ring, launching a lawsuit against King in June 1998 citing fraud and breach of contract and attempted to sever ties with King completely, agreeing in principle to a 8-fight, $30 million deal with Main Events and HBO. However, a federal judge ruled in King's favor preventing Trinidad's separation from King in November and in December Trinidad and King came to an agreement on a $42.9 million deal nine-fight, three-year deal that would keep Trinidad under King's promotion.

In early January 1999, Whitaker and Trinidad would officially announce their title fight would finally take place on February 20, 1999, in Madison Square Garden. Whitaker, who was ending his 16-month period of inactivity and was now 35-years old, nine years older than the 26-year old Trinidad, who had made 13 consecutive successful defenses of his title, came into the fight a 5-1 underdog. Upon arriving to the pre-fight weigh-in, Trinidad reportedly weighed three pounds over the 147-pound limit, leading to him having to run around New York City wearing heavy clothing while Don King stalled for time. When he returned nearly an hour later, Trinidad had made the weight.

== The fight ==
Whitaker got off to a good start, winning the first round on two scorecards, but was dominated by Trinidad for almost the entire rest of the fight, losing an extremely lopsided unanimous decision with two judges scoring the fight 118–109 and one scoring the fight 117–110, all in Trinidad's favor. Trinidad had almost ended the fight during the sixth round after fracturing Whitaker's jaw in the round, though Whitaker insisted on continuing the fight. Whitaker was the busier fighter, throwing 749 punches compared to Trinidad's 518, though he landed just 234 for a 31% success rate while Trinidad scored 278 punches for a 58% success rate. This was seen in the eyes of many boxing observers as Whitaker's "first actual loss" of his career.

== Fight card ==
Confirmed bouts:

Weight Class	Weight		vs.		Method	Round	Notes
Welterweight	147 lbs.	Félix Trinidad (c)	def.	Pernell Whitaker	UD	12/12	^{Note 1}
Super Lightweight	140 lbs.	Terron Millett	def.	Vince Phillips	TKO	5/12	^{Note 2}
Middleweight	160 lbs.	Julio César Green	def.	Darren Obah	TKO	9/12	^{Note 3}
Super Lightweight	140 lbs.	Gilberto Serrano	def.	Edelmiro Martinez	KO	6/8
Lightweight	135 lbs.	Melissa Del Valle	def.	Cora Webber	UD	8/8
Light Middleweight	154 lbs.	Vernon Forrest	def.	Mark Fernandez	TKO	2/8
Light Middleweight	154 lbs.	Andrew Lewis	def.	John Stewart	TKO	1/8
Super Bantamweight	122 lbs.	Omar Adorno	def.	Pedro Santos	KO	4/6
Welterweight	147 lbs.	Vivian Harris	def.	Jerry Smith	KO	1/4

^Note 1 For IBF Welterweight title
^Note 2 For IBF Super Lightweight title
^Note 3 For WBA Interim Middleweight title

== Broadcasting ==
Country	Broadcaster
United States	HBO

Preceded by vs. Mahenge Zulu	Félix Trinidad's bouts 20 February 1999	Succeeded by vs. Hugo Pineda
Preceded by vs. Andrey Pestryayev	Pernell Whitaker's bouts 20 February 1999	Succeeded by vs. Carlos Bojorquez
