= Zack Padilla =

American boxer

Personal information
- Nickname: Zack Attack
- Born: Zachary P. Padilla; March 15, 1963 (age 63) Azusa, California, U.S.
- Height: 5 ft 7 1/2 in (171 cm)
- Weight: Light welterweight

Boxing career
- Reach: 70 in (178 cm)
- Stance: Orthodox

Boxing record
- Total fights: 24
- Wins: 22
- Win by KO: 14
- Losses: 1
- Draws: 1

Zachary P. "Zack" Padilla (born March 15, 1963, in Azusa, California), and also known as Zack Attack, is a retired American boxer and a former WBO Light Welterweight champion.

== Professional career ==
Padilla turned pro in 1985 and retired shortly thereafter in 1986 after a TKO loss to Dwayne Prim.

In 1991, he returned to boxing and went on a nine-fight winning streak, which included victories over future champion James Page and former champion Roger Mayweather, before challenging for a world title. In 1993, he captured the WBO Light Welterweight Title in an upset unanimous decision victory over undefeated Carlos Gonzalez. Later that year, he was named the Ring magazine comeback fighter of the year. Padilla successfully defended his title four times with victories over Efrem Calamati (35-0-1), Ray Oliveira, Harold Miller, and former champion Juan Laporte. His fight with Olivera in 1993 once held the Compubox record for the most punches thrown in a fight at 3,020.

== Professional boxing record ==
24 fights	22 wins	1 loss
By knockout	14	1
By decision	8	0
Draws	1	

No.	Result	Record	Opponent	Type	Round, time	Date	Location	Notes
24	Win	22–1–1	Juan Laporte	RTD	9 (12)	1994-07-24	Olympic Auditorium, Los Angeles, California, U.S.	Retained WBO light welterweight title
23	Win	21–1–1	Harold Miller	TKO	7 (12)	1994-04-18	Sportpaleis Ahoy', Rotterdam, Netherlands	Retained WBO light welterweight title
22	Win	20–1–1	Dwayne Swift	TKO	4 (10)	1994-03-12	Olympic Auditorium, Los Angeles, California, U.S.	
21	Win	19–1–1	Ray Oliveira	UD	12 (12)	1993-12-16	Foxwoods Resort Casino, Mashantucket, Connecticut, U.S.	Retained WBO light welterweight title
20	Win	18–1–1	Efrem Calamati	TKO	8 (12)	1993-11-19	Palasport, Arezzo, Italy	Retained WBO light welterweight title
19	Win	17–1–1	Carlos González	UD	12 (12)	1993-06-07	Thomas & Mack Center, Paradise, Nevada, U.S.	Won WBO light welterweight title
18	Win	16–1–1	Roger Mayweather	SD	10 (10)	1993-04-24	Aladdin Hotel & Casino, Paradise, Nevada, U.S.	
17	Win	15–1–1	Ricky Meyers	RTD	6 (10)	1993-02-05	Harrah's Casino Hotel, Atlantic City, New Jersey, U.S.	
16	Win	14–1–1	Miguel González	UD	10 (10)	1992-12-09	Hollywood Palladium, Hollywood, California, U.S.	
15	Win	13–1–1	Jesus Cardenas	TKO	5 (10)	1992-08-24	Great Western Forum, Inglewood, California, U.S.	
14	Win	12–1–1	José Castro	TKO	6 (10)	1992-06-25	Marriott Hotel, Irvine, California, U.S.	
13	Win	11–1–1	Danny Perez	UD	10 (10)	1992-03-19	Marriott Hotel, Irvine, California, U.S.	
12	Win	10–1–1	James Page	UD	6 (6)	1991-11-15	Civic Auditorium, San Francisco, California, U.S.	
11	Win	9–1–1	Cesar Valdez	PTS	6 (6)	1991-08-26	Great Western Forum, Inglewood, California, U.S.	
10	Win	8–1–1	Johnny Gonzalez	PTS	4 (4)	1991-06-17	Great Western Forum, Inglewood, California, U.S.	
9	Loss	7–1–1	Dwayne Prim	TKO	2 (8)	1986-04-11	Sahara Hotel & Casino, Winchester, Nevada, U.S.	
8	Win	7–0–1	Eddie Gonzalez	KO	1 (8)	1986-02-07	Cal Poly Pomona Gym, Pomona, California, U.S.	
7	Win	6–0–1	Frank Lopez	TKO	2 (8)	1985-12-17	Club Metro, Riverside, California, U.S.	
6	Win	5–0–1	Andres Felix	TKO	3 (6)	1985-11-17	Coachella Valley High School, Thermal, California, U.S.	
5	Win	4–0–1	Lawrence Caver	TKO	4 (4)	1985-11-10	Cal Poly Pomona Gym, Pomona, California, U.S.	
4	Win	3–0–1	Miguel Chamiso	KO	1 (4)	1985-08-24	Pride Pavilion, Phoenix, Arizona, U.S.	
3	Draw	2–0–1	Ernie Landeros	PTS	4 (4)	1985-07-25	Showboat Hotel and Casino, Las Vegas, Nevada, U.S.	
2	Win	2–0	Carl McCoy	KO	2 (?)	1985-06-10	San Rafael, California, U.S.	
1	Win	1–0	Francisco Gutierrez	KO	2 (4)	1985-05-16	El Cortez Hotel, San Diego, California, U.S.	

== Final retirement ==
During a sparring session with Shane Mosley, Padilla was hit with a hard punch which aggravated a head injury from his last fight. Padilla's boxing license was then suspended indefinitely, and he never fought again. He had a career record of 24-1-1 with 14 KOs.

== See also ==
- Cauliflower Alley Club
- List of Mexican boxing world champions
- List of world light-welterweight boxing champions

Sporting positions
World boxing titles
Preceded by Carlos González	WBO light welterweight champion June 7, 1993 – 1994; Retired	Vacant Title next held by Sammy Fuentes
