= Terron Millett =

American boxer

Personal information
- Nickname: The Tramp
- Born: June 28, 1968 (age 58) Colorado Springs, Colorado, U.S.
- Height: 5 ft 7 in (170 cm)
- Weight: Light welterweight

Boxing career
- Reach: 67 in (170 cm)
- Stance: Orthodox

Boxing record
- Total fights: 33
- Wins: 27
- Win by KO: 19
- Losses: 5
- Draws: 1

Terron Millett (/təˈrɒn mɪˈlɛt/ tə-RON mi-LET; born June 28, 1968) is an American former professional boxer who competed from 1993 to 2003, holding the IBF light welterweight title from 1999 to 2000. As an amateur, he was a National Golden Gloves champion.

== Amateur career ==
Millett was the 1991 National Golden Gloves Light welterweight champion.

== Professional career ==
Millett made his professional debut in 1993, defeating Louis Saucedo. He won the IBF junior welterweight title on February 20, 1999, upsetting Vince Phillips via fifth-round technical knockout (TKO) at Madison Square Garden. He was stripped of his belt due to an injury preventing him from defending the title. He would get another shot at the title against Zab Judah but was stopped in the fourth round. He would also face future hall of famer Arturo Gatti, losing via stoppage.

== Professional boxing record ==
33 fights	27 wins	5 losses
By knockout	19	4
By decision	8	1
Draws	1	

No.	Result	Record	Opponent	Type	Round, time	Date	Location	Notes
33	Loss	27–5–1	Michael Stewart	TKO	3 (12)	2003-06-27	Tropicana Hotel & Casino, Atlantic City, New Jersey, U.S.	For USBA light-welterweight title
32	Loss	27–4–1	Ricardo Williams	UD	10 (10)	2002-11-02	MGM Grand Garden Arena, Paradise, Nevada, U.S.	
31	Win	27–3–1	Damone Wright	SD	8 (8)	2002-05-11	SC Expo Hall, Colorado Springs, Colorado, U.S.	
30	Loss	26–3–1	Arturo Gatti	TKO	4 (10)	Jan 26, 2002	MSG Theater, New York City, New York, U.S.	
29	Win	26–2–1	Bernard Harris	UD	10 (10)	2001-10-19	Hilton & Towers, Washington, D.C., U.S.	
28	Win	25–2–1	Fray Luis Sierra	KO	5 (10)	2001-07-17	State Fairgrounds, Des Moines, Iowa, U.S.	
27	Win	24–2–1	Luis Deines Pérez	UD	10 (10)	2001-05-11	Civic Center, Savannah, Georgia, U.S.	
26	Win	23–2–1	Mickle Orr	TKO	1 (?)	2001-04-05	Mountaineer Casino, New Cumberland, West Virginia, U.S.	
25	Loss	22–2–1	Zab Judah	TKO	4 (12)	2000-08-05	Mohegan Sun Casino, Uncasville, Connecticut, U.S.	For IBF light-welterweight title
24	Win	22–1–1	Virgil McClendon	TKO	12 (12)	1999-07-24	Flamingo Hilton, Paradise, Nevada, U.S.	Retained IBF light-welterweight title
23	Win	21–1–1	Vince Phillips	TKO	5 (12)	1999-02-20	Madison Square Garden, New York City, New York, U.S.	Won IBF light-welterweight title
22	Win	20–1–1	Freddie Pendleton	UD	12 (12)	1998-05-29	Las Vegas Hilton, Winchester, Nevada, U.S.	Won USBA light-welterweight title
21	Win	19–1–1	Nelson Hernandez	TKO	1 (10)	1998-03-14	Palace Theater, Altoona, Iowa, U.S.	
20	Win	18–1–1	Bernard Grant	PTS	10 (10)	1997-10-14	Nashville, Tennessee, U.S.	
19	Win	17–1–1	Jimmie Morgan	TKO	1 (10)	1997-07-19	Arena, Nashville, Tennessee, U.S.	
18	Win	16–1–1	Tony Limones	TKO	3 (?)	1997-04-19	Memorial Auditorium, Shreveport, Louisiana, U.S.	
17	Win	15–1–1	Eric Ramon Vazquez	TKO	1 (8)	1996-11-20	War Memorial Auditorium, Fort Lauderdale, Florida, U.S.	
16	Win	14–1–1	Ruben Otero	TKO	1 (8)	1996-09-18	War Memorial Auditorium, Fort Lauderdale, Florida, U.S.	
15	Win	13–1–1	John Jeter	TKO	2 (?)	1996-09-03	Memphis, Tennessee, U.S.	
14	Win	12–1–1	Clifford Hicks	TKO	3 (?)	1996-02-24	Coliseum, Richmond, Virginia, U.S.	
13	Loss	11–1–1	Sharmba Mitchell	TKO	1 (8)	1995-09-16	The Mirage, Paradise, Nevada, U.S.	
12	Win	11–0–1	Juan Martin Galvan	TKO	1 (8)	1995-08-12	MGM Grand Garden Arena, Paradise, Nevada, U.S.	
11	Win	10–0–1	Ruben Otero	TKO	1 (?)	1995-01-03	Memphis, Tennessee, U.S.	
10	Draw	9–0–1	Ken Jamerson	SD	8 (8)	1994-06-23	Florissant, Missouri, U.S.	
9	Win	9–0	Alvin Patten	PTS	4 (4)	1994-02-19	Coliseum, Charlotte, North Carolina, U.S.	
8	Win	8–0	Jorge Valenzuela	KO	1 (4)	1994-01-29	MGM Grand Garden Arena, Paradise, Nevada, U.S.	
7	Win	7–0	Daniel Hernandez	UD	6 (6)	1993-12-15	Aladdin Hotel & Casino, Paradise, Nevada, U.S.	
6	Win	6–0	Billy Outley	KO	1 (?)	1993-10-30	Westport Playhouse, St. Louis, Missouri, U.S.	
5	Win	5–0	Ruben Gonzalez	PTS	4 (4)	1993-09-10	Alamodome, San Antonio, Texas, U.S.	
4	Win	4–0	Glenn Smith	TKO	1 (4)	1993-08-27	Regal Riverfront Hotel, St. Louis, Missouri, U.S.	
3	Win	3–0	Anthony Nellems	KO	1 (?)	1993-06-25	Regal Riverfront Hotel, St. Louis, Missouri, U.S.	
2	Win	2–0	Porfirio Torres	TKO	2 (4)	1993-05-07	Sands Hotel and Casino, Paradise, Nevada, U.S.	
1	Win	1–0	Louis Saucedo	TKO	1 (4)	1993-04-20	Riviera Hotel & Casino, Winchester, Nevada, U.S.	

== See also ==
- List of world light-welterweight boxing champions

Sporting positions
Amateur boxing titles
Previous: Mark Lewis	Golden Gloves light-welterweight champion 1991	Next: Robert Frazier
Regional boxing titles
Preceded by Freddie Pendleton	USBA light-welterweight champion May 29, 1998 – February 20, 1999; Won world title	Vacant Title next held by DeMarcus Corley
World boxing titles
Preceded by Vince Phillips	IBF light-welterweight champion February 20, 1999 – December 22, 1999; Stripped	Vacant Title next held by Zab Judah
