= Charlie Brown (boxer) =

American boxer

Personal information
- Nickname: Choo Choo
- Born: April 5, 1958 (age 68) Philadelphia, Pennsylvania, U.S.
- Height: 5 ft 6 in (168 cm)
- Weight: Lightweight

Boxing career
- Reach: 72 in (183 cm)
- Stance: Orthodox

Boxing record
- Total fights: 44
- Wins: 26
- Win by KO: 18
- Losses: 16
- Draws: 2

Charlie "Choo Choo" Brown (born April 5, 1958 in Philadelphia, Pennsylvania) is an American former professional boxer who was the IBF Lightweight champion of the world.

== Professional career ==
Known as "Choo-Choo" Brown, Brown turned pro in 1979 and captured the vacant newly created IBF lightweight title with a decision win over Melvin Paul in 1984. He lost the belt in his first defense to Harry Arroyo the same year, in a bout refereed by International Boxing Hall of Fame member Larry Hazzard. Brown never fought for another major title and retired after 11 consecutive losses in 1993, including losses to Tyrone Crawley, Loreto Garza, Cornelius Boza-Edwards, and José Luis Ramírez.

== Professional boxing record ==
44 fights	26 wins	16 losses
By knockout	18	11
By decision	8	5
Draws	2	

No.	Result	Record	Opponent	Type	Round, time	Date	Age	Location	Notes
44	Loss	26–16–2	Sammy Fuentes	KO	2 (10)	Jul 9, 1993	35 years, 65 days	Noumea, New Caledonia	
43	Loss	26–15–2	Johnny Bizzarro	KO	10 (10)	Feb 7, 1993	34 years, 278 days	Erie, Pennsylvania, U.S.	
42	Loss	26–14–2	Tommy Small	TKO	4 (?), 1:00	Oct 10, 1992	34 years, 158 days	Clarksburg, West Virginia, U.S.	
41	Loss	26–13–2	Joseph Alexander	TKO	4 (8)	Oct 5, 1989	31 years, 153 days	Blue Horizon, Philadelphia, Pennsylvania, U.S.	
40	Loss	26–12–2	Donald Gwinn	UD	8	Jul 14, 1989	31 years, 70 days	Parkersburg, West Virginia, U.S.	
39	Loss	26–11–2	Genaro León	KO	2 (10)	Jul 23, 1988	30 years, 79 days	Tijuana, Baja California, Mexico	
38	Loss	26–10–2	Stanley Longstreet	TKO	4 (10), 1:09	Apr 29, 1988	29 years, 360 days	Cobo Arena, Detroit, Michigan, U.S.	
37	Loss	26–9–2	Loreto Garza	TKO	4 (10), 1:09	Feb 12, 1988	29 years, 283 days	Arco Arena, Sacramento, California, U.S.	
36	Loss	26–8–2	Tony Martin	TKO	8 (10)	Nov 11, 1987	29 years, 190 days	Resorts International, Atlantic City, New Jersey, U.S.	
35	Loss	26–7–2	José Luis Ramírez	UD	10	Oct 25, 1986	28 years, 173 days	Zenith Palais, Paris, France	
34	Loss	26–6–2	Anthony Williams	MD	8	Sep 30, 1986	28 years, 148 days	Blue Horizon, Philadelphia, Pennsylvania, U.S.	
33	Win	26–5–2	Nick Parker	PTS	10	Dec 2, 1985	27 years, 211 days	Entertainment Centre, Sydney, New South Wales, Australia	
32	Win	25–5–2	Pat Leglise	KO	3 (10)	Sep 20, 1985	27 years, 138 days	Hordern Pavilion, Sydney, New South Wales, Australia	
31	Loss	24–5–2	Tyrone Crawley	MD	12	Jun 5, 1985	27 years, 31 days	Resorts International, Atlantic City, New Jersey, U.S.	For vacant NABF lightweight title
30	Draw	24–4–2	Jorge Nina	PTS	8	Feb 7, 1985	26 years, 278 days	Golden Eagle Caterers, Philadelphia, Pennsylvania, U.S.	
29	Loss	24–4–1	Cornelius Boza-Edwards	TKO	3 (10), 1:27	Oct 13, 1984	26 years, 161 days	Kings Hall, Belfast, Northern Ireland, U.K.	
28	Win	24–3–1	Ezzard Charles Adams	TKO	1 (10), 0:43	Aug 29, 1984	26 years, 116 days	Sands Casino Hotel, Atlantic City, New Jersey, U.S.	
27	Loss	23–3–1	Harry Arroyo	TKO	14 (15), 2:07	Apr 15, 1984	25 years, 346 days	Sands Casino Hotel, Atlantic City, New Jersey, U.S.	Lost IBF lightweight title
26	Win	23–2–1	Melvin Paul	SD	15	Jan 30, 1984	25 years, 270 days	Sands Casino Hotel, Atlantic City, New Jersey, U.S.	Won inaugural IBF lightweight title
25	Win	22–2–1	Ruben Munoz Jr.	KO	1 (10), 1:32	Dec 13, 1983	25 years, 222 days	Sands Casino Hotel, Atlantic City, New Jersey, U.S.	
24	Win	21–2–1	Sammy Matos	TKO	2 (10)	Oct 26, 1983	25 years, 174 days	Sands Casino Hotel, Atlantic City, New Jersey, U.S.	
23	Win	20–2–1	Jerome Artis	UD	10	Jun 15, 1983	25 years, 41 days	Playboy Hotel & Casino, Atlantic City, New Jersey, U.S.	
22	Win	19–2–1	Al Carter	TKO	9 (10)	May 5, 1983	25 years, 0 days	Resorts International, Atlantic City, New Jersey, U.S.	
21	Win	18–2–1	Gary Gibson	UD	8	Nov 18, 1982	24 years, 197 days	Ice World, Totowa, New Jersey, U.S.	
20	Win	17–2–1	Marcus Starks	UD	8	Jun 13, 1982	24 years, 39 days	Sands Casino Hotel, Atlantic City, New Jersey, U.S.	
19	Win	16–2–1	Luis Mejias	UD	10	May 16, 1982	24 years, 11 days	Harrah's Marina Resort, Atlantic City, New Jersey, U.S.	
18	Win	15–2–1	Derrick Cuttino	TKO	6 (8)	Mar 27, 1982	23 years, 326 days	Civic Center, Philadelphia, Pennsylvania, U.S.	
17	Win	14–2–1	Quentin Blackman	TKO	1 (?), 0:50	Nov 10, 1981	23 years, 189 days	Sands Casino Hotel, Atlantic City, New Jersey, U.S.	
16	Win	13–2–1	Dexter Smith	TKO	4 (6)	Jul 25, 1981	23 years, 81 days	Resorts International, Atlantic City, New Jersey, U.S.	
15	Win	12–2–1	Gary Brown	TKO	8 (8), 1:19	Jun 14, 1981	23 years, 40 days	Sands Casino Hotel, Atlantic City, New Jersey, U.S.	
14	Win	11–2–1	Marion Thomas	TKO	1 (?)	Mar 28, 1981	22 years, 327 days	Resorts International, Atlantic City, New Jersey, U.S.	
13	Loss	10–2–1	Curtis Harris	TKO	4 (10), 1:20	Sep 18, 1980	22 years, 136 days	Ice World, Totowa, New Jersey, U.S.	
12	Win	10–1–1	Gary Hinton	PTS	10	Jul 3, 1980	22 years, 59 days	Resorts International Rutland Room, Atlantic City, New Jersey, U.S.	
11	Win	9–1–1	Michael Ross	TKO	6 (8), 1:32	Jun 5, 1980	22 years, 31 days	Resorts International, Atlantic City, New Jersey, U.S.	
10	Draw	8–1–1	Greg Netter	PTS	6	Feb 18, 1980	21 years, 289 days	Forum, Upper Darby, Pennsylvania, U.S.	
9	Win	8–1	Elliot Freeman	KO	3 (8)	Nov 29, 1979	21 years, 208 days	Alan B. Shepard Civic Center, Virginia Beach, Virginia, U.S.	
8	Loss	7–1	Jose Gonzalez	UD	6	Nov 21, 1979	21 years, 200 days	Rockne Hall, Allentown, Pennsylvania, U.S.	
7	Win	7–0	Jerry Strickland	KO	2 (?), 1:25	Nov 8, 1979	21 years, 187 days	Tyndall Armory, Indianapolis, Indiana, U.S.	
6	Win	6–0	Angel Cruz	PTS	6	Sep 11, 1979	21 years, 129 days	Spectrum, Philadelphia, Pennsylvania, U.S.	
5	Win	5–0	Danny Daniels	TKO	1 (6) 2:40	Aug 18, 1979	21 years, 87 days	Resorts International, Atlantic City, New Jersey, U.S.	
4	Win	4–0	Henry Barber	KO	3 (?), 0:43	Jul 31, 1979	21 years, 87 days	Steel Pier Arena, Atlantic City, New Jersey, U.S.	
3	Win	3–0	C.J. Faison	KO	3 (?), 0:45	May 23, 1979	21 years, 18 days	Starplex Armory, Washington, D.C., U.S.	
2	Win	2–0	Cortez Jackson	KO	1 (4), 1:09	May 22, 1979	21 years, 17 days	Forum, Upper Darby, Pennsylvania, U.S.	
1	Win	1–0	Wayne Dabney	KO	1 (4), 1:30	Apr 10, 1979	20 years, 340 days	The Blue Horizon, Philadelphia, Pennsylvania, U.S.	

== See also ==
List of world lightweight boxing champions

Sporting positions
World boxing titles
Inaugural champion	IBF lightweight champion January 30, 1984 – April 15, 1984	Succeeded by Harry Arroyo
