= Harry Arroyo =

American boxer

Personal information
- Nickname: Dirty
- Born: October 25, 1957 (age 68) Youngstown, Ohio, U.S.
- Height: 5 ft 10 in (178 cm)
- Weight: Lightweight; Light welterweight; Light middleweight

Boxing career
- Reach: 72 in (183 cm)
- Stance: Orthodox

Boxing record
- Total fights: 51
- Wins: 40
- Win by KO: 30
- Losses: 11

Harry Arroyo (born October 25, 1957) is an American former professional boxer who held the IBF lightweight title from 1984 to 1985.

== Early years ==
Nicknamed "Dirty Harry", Arroyo, of Puerto Rican descent, was born on the south side of Youngstown, Ohio, a steel-manufacturing center near the Pennsylvania border. As a child, he reportedly told his 15 siblings about his dream of becoming a nationally known fighter. In the 1980s, he became one of the most recognizable boxers on television and regularly appeared on the covers of boxing magazines. In 1984, Arroyo, with fellow Youngstown native Ray Mancini, was listed among the nation's top 10 contenders by the World Boxing Association. This was after Mancini had lost that organization's world title to Livingstone Bramble.

== Boxing career ==
Arroyo fought for nine years as an amateur boxer, winning several Golden Glove tournaments as well as eight AAU Regional Tournaments. As an amateur he had 110 wins and 15 losses. He worked up a record of 40 wins and 11 losses as a professional, and won the IBF's world lightweight title by beating Charlie "Choo Choo" Brown in the 14th round on April 15, 1984. Arroyo, a late substitute for Cornelius Boza Edwards, staggered Brown with two blows to the head, prompting referee Larry Hazzard to stop the fight. On September 1, 1984, Arroyo successfully defended his title against Charlie "White Lightning" Brown, in a bout held in Struthers, Ohio. The champion successfully defended his title once more against Terrence Alli, before losing to Jimmy Paul on April 4, 1985.

== Professional boxing record ==
51 fights	40 wins	11 losses
By knockout	30	4
By decision	10	7

No.	Result	Record	Opponent	Type	Round, time	Date	Location	Notes
51	Loss	40–11	Vinny Letizia	UD	10 (10)	1993-02-26	Union Hall, Countryside, Illinois, U.S.	
50	Win	40–10	Jerry Massey	TKO	7 (?)	1992-05-29	Struthers, Ohio, U.S.	
49	Loss	39–10	Javier Castillejo	TKO	3 (8)	1992-04-10	Leganés, Spain	
48	Win	39–9	Homknokkor Som Song	PTS	10 (10)	1991-08-15	Plaza de Toros de Puerto Banus, Marbella, Spain	
47	Loss	38–9	Tommy Small	MD	12 (12)	1991-06-22	Greer Pavilion, Morgantown, West Virginia, U.S.	For vacant WBF light-middleweight title
46	Loss	38–8	Valery Kayumba	TKO	7 (10)	1991-04-17	Paris, France	
45	Loss	38–7	Carl Griffith	UD	10 (10)	1990-08-24	Landerhaven Country Club, Mayfield, Ohio, U.S.	
44	Loss	38–6	Roger Brown	UD	10 (10)	1989-05-04	Diplomat Hotel, Hallandale Beach, Florida, U.S.	
43	Win	38–5	Bruce Strauss	TKO	2 (10)	1989-01-26	War Memorial Auditorium, Rochester, New York, U.S.	
42	Win	37–5	Raul Torres	SD	10 (10)	1988-11-19	Quality Inn, Erie, Pennsylvania, U.S.	
41	Loss	36–5	Loreto Garza	TKO	1 (12)	1988-04-22	ARCO Arena, Sacramento, California, U.S.	Lost WBC Continental Americas light-welterweight title
40	Win	36–4	Rick Souce	TKO	8 (12)	1988-02-23	Dallas, Texas, U.S.	Won vacant WBC Continental Americas light-welterweight title
39	Win	35–4	Nick Parker	TKO	5 (10)	1987-11-18	Maronite Center, Youngstown, Ohio, U.S.	
38	Win	34–4	Nick Parker	TKO	7 (10)	1987-08-28	Hyatt Regency, Columbus, Ohio, U.S.	
37	Win	33–4	Reggie Robinson	UD	10 (10)	1987-07-03	Harlingen, Texas, U.S.	
36	Loss	32–4	Roger Brown	MD	10 (10)	1987-02-19	Cascade Holiday Inn, Akron, Ohio, U.S.	
35	Win	32–3	Derwin Richards	SD	10 (10)	1987-01-17	Casa de Amistad, Harlingen, Texas, U.S.	
34	Win	31–3	Rick Kaiser	TKO	2 (10)	1986-11-25	Harvey Hall, Tyler, Texas, U.S.	
33	Win	30–3	Danny Ferris	TKO	2 (10)	1986-11-01	Coliseum Theatre, Latham, New York, U.S.	
32	Loss	29–3	Vinny Paz	UD	10 (10)	1986-05-18	Civic Center, Providence, Rhode Island, U.S.	
31	Win	29–2	Paul Graham	KO	8 (10)	1986-03-19	Warren, Ohio, U.S.	
30	Win	28–2	Leo Simmons	TKO	5 (10)	1986-02-04	Mr. Anthony's, Youngstown, Ohio, U.S.	
29	Win	27–2	Darrell Jacobs	TKO	6 (10)	1985-12-04	Mr. Anthony's, Youngstown, Ohio, U.S.	
28	Loss	26–2	Sammy Fuentes	KO	7 (10)	1985-10-09	Trump Hotel and Casino, Atlantic City, New Jersey, U.S.	
27	Loss	26–1	Jimmy Paul	UD	15 (15)	1985-04-06	Bally's Park Place, Atlantic City, New Jersey, U.S.	Lost IBF lightweight title
26	Win	26–0	Terrence Alli	TKO	11 (15)	1985-01-12	Bally's Park Place, Atlantic City, New Jersey, U.S.	Retained IBF lightweight title
25	Win	25–0	Charlie Brown	TKO	8 (15)	1984-09-01	High Stadium, Struthers, Ohio, U.S.	Retained IBF lightweight title
24	Win	24–0	Charlie Brown	TKO	14 (15)	1984-04-15	Sands Casino, Atlantic City, New Jersey, U.S.	Won IBF lightweight title
23	Win	23–0	Robin Blake	UD	10 (10)	1984-01-14	Resorts Casino Hotel, Atlantic City, New Jersey, U.S.	
22	Win	22–0	Danny Avery	TKO	9 (10)	1983-10-20	Resorts Casino Hotel, Atlantic City, New Jersey, U.S.	
21	Win	21–0	Steve Hilliard	TKO	5 (10)	1983-10-06	Resorts Casino Hotel, Atlantic City, New Jersey, U.S.	
20	Win	20–0	Tomas Chavez	TKO	9 (10)	1983-06-15	Grand Olympic Auditorium, Los Angeles, California, U.S.	
19	Win	19–0	Roberto Garcia	TKO	2 (10)	1983-04-03	Phoenix Civic Plaza, Phoenix, Arizona, U.S.	
18	Win	18–0	Kelvin Lampkin	PTS	10 (10)	1983-02-12	Buckner Fieldhouse, Fort Richardson, Alaska, U.S.	
17	Win	17–0	Joe Manley	SD	10 (10)	1982-10-30	Sands Casino, Atlantic City, New Jersey, U.S.	
16	Win	16–0	Arnie Wells	UD	10 (10)	1982-08-30	V.I.P. Club, Niles, Ohio, U.S.	
15	Win	15–0	Kevin Austin	TKO	5 (8)	1982-07-24	Mollenkopf Stadium, Warren, Ohio, U.S.	
14	Win	14–0	Paul Hodge	KO	1 (10)	1982-07-08	Idora Park, Youngstown, Ohio, U.S.	
13	Win	13–0	Mike Soldier	KO	2 (10)	1982-05-27	Idora Park, Youngstown, Ohio, U.S.	
12	Win	12–0	Robert Bo Moody	TKO	10 (10)	1982-04-28	Field House, Struthers, Ohio, U.S.	
11	Win	11–0	Greg Young	TKO	4 (?)	1982-04-17	Harrah's Marina Resort, Atlantic City, New Jersey, U.S.	
10	Win	10–0	Sam Gervins	TKO	6 (8)	1982-03-17	V.I.P. Club, Niles, Ohio, U.S.	
9	Win	9–0	Bruce Williams	TKO	5 (6)	1982-03-13	Playboy Hotel & Casino, Atlantic City, New Jersey, U.S.	
8	Win	8–0	Blas Dechamps	PTS	6 (6)	1982-01-26	Tropicana Hotel & Casino, Atlantic City, New Jersey, U.S.	
7	Win	7–0	Roberto Munoz	TKO	2 (6)	1981-12-29	Tropicana Hotel & Casino, Atlantic City, New Jersey, U.S.	
6	Win	6–0	Ken Payton	TKO	1 (6)	1981-12-23	Memorial Civic Center, Canton, Ohio, U.S.	
5	Win	5–0	Leon Gardner	TKO	6 (6)	1981-10-29	Packard Music Hall, Warren, Ohio, U.S.	
4	Win	4–0	Kean McGill	UD	6 (6)	1981-10-21	V.I.P. Club, Niles, Ohio, U.S.	
3	Win	3–0	Tim Murphy	KO	1 (6)	1981-08-15	Gannon College Auditorium, Erie, Pennsylvania, U.S.	
2	Win	2–0	Jesse Jackson	TKO	2 (4)	1980-12-16	Masonic Auditorium, Cleveland, Ohio, U.S.	
1	Win	1–0	Dale Gordon	TKO	4 (6)	1980-09-30	V.I.P. Club, Niles, Ohio, U.S.	

== Retirement ==
Arroyo has expressed disappointment over the fact that he never had a chance to meet fellow Youngstown pugilist Ray "Boom Boom" Mancini in the ring. The possibility of a matchup between the two fighters emerged in the early 1980s, but circumstances intervened. Arroyo won the IBF title just two months before Mancini's first loss to Livingstone Bramble. Mancini took a break from boxing for several years after losing his title, and by the time he re-entered the ring, Arroyo's career had waned considerably. Both men were on hand, however, when fellow Youngstown native Kelly Pavlik took the WBC and WBO middleweight world championship in Atlantic City on September 29, 2007.

Even at the height of his popularity and while fighting main card events on network television, Arroyo continued to work as a police officer for the Mill Creek Park Police and was easily recognizable in the community. Arroyo was highly popular across the Mahoning Valley region and was readily accessible to his fans. He continued to work the park district long after retiring from boxing.

Retired from the ring, Arroyo is married and has five children.

== Officiating career ==
After his retirement, Arroyo become a boxing referee, and has officiated dozens of fights, mainly in Ohio.

== See also ==
- Boxing in Puerto Rico
- List of Puerto Rican boxing world champions
- List of world lightweight boxing champions

Sporting positions
Regional boxing titles
Vacant Title last held by Mauricio Rodriguez	WBC Continental Americas light-welterweight champion February 23, 1988 – April 22, 1988	Succeeded by Loreto Garza
World boxing titles
Preceded by Charlie Brown	IBF lightweight champion April 15, 1984 – April 6, 1985	Succeeded by Jimmy Paul
