= Giovanni Parisi =

Italian boxer

Personal information
- Nickname: Flash
- Born: 2 December 1967 Vibo Valentia, Italy
- Died: 25 March 2009 (aged 41) Voghera, Italy
- Height: 5 ft 8 in (173 cm)
- Weight: Lightweight; Light welterweight; Welterweight

Boxing career
- Stance: Orthodox

Boxing record
- Total fights: 47
- Wins: 41
- Win by KO: 29
- Losses: 5
- Draws: 1
Medal record
Men's Boxing
Representing Italy
Olympic Games
Gold medal – first place	1988 Seoul	Featherweight

Giovanni Parisi (2 December 1967 – 25 March 2009) was an Italian boxer who competed from 1989 to 2006. He was a world champion in two weight classes, having held the World Boxing Organization (WBO) lightweight title from 1992 to 1994, and the WBO light-welterweight title 1996 to 1998. As an amateur, he won the gold medal in the featherweight weight class at the 1988 Summer Olympics.

== 1988 Olympic results ==
Below is the record of Giovanni Parisi, an Italian featherweight boxer who competed at the 1988 Seoul Olympics:

- Round of 64: bye
- Round of 32: defeated Lu Chih Hsiung (Taipei) by decision, 5-0
- Round of 16: defeated Mikhail Kazaryan (Soviet Union) referee stopped contest in the second round
- Quarterfinal: defeated Ya'acov Shmuel (Israel) by decision, 5-0
- Semifinal: defeated Abdelhak Achik (Morocco) referee stopped contest in the first round
- Final: defeated Daniel Dumitrescu (Romania) by first-round knockout (won gold medal)

== Professional career ==
A native of Vibo Valentia, Calabria, Parisi began his professional career in 1989 and won the vacant WBO lightweight title by defeating Javier Altamirano in 1992. He later defeated former champion Freddie Pendleton and in 1995 challenged Mexican legend Julio César Chávez for the WBC light-welterweight Title, losing a unanimous decision. Parisi went on to capture the WBO light-welterweight title and defend it successfully six times. He lost the WBO light-welterweight belt to Carlos Gonzalez in May 1998, and failed in a challenge for the welterweight title against Daniel Santos in July 2000.

He last fought in September 2006, when he lost a majority decision against Frederic Klose in Milan for the European welterweight crown.

== Professional boxing record ==
47 fights	41 wins	5 losses
By knockout	29	3
By decision	12	2
Draws	1	

No.	Result	Record	Opponent	Type	Round, time	Date	Location	Notes
47	Loss	41–5–1	Frederic Klose	MD	12	8 Oct 2006	PalaLido, Milan, Italy	For European welterweight title
46	Win	41–4–1	Lubomir Wejs	TKO	6 (8)	9 May 2006	Sazka Arena, Prague, Czech Republic	
45	Win	40–4–1	Louis Mimoune	UD	10	12 Mar 2005	Mazda Palace, Milan, Italy	
44	Win	39–4–1	Miguel Ángel Peña	UD	8	11 Feb 2003	Pentagono, Bormio, Italy	
43	Loss	38–4–1	Daniel Santos	KO	4 (12)	29 Jul 2000	Stadio Oreste Granillo, Reggio Calabria, Italy	For WBO welterweight title
42	Win	38–3–1	Jose Luis Baltazar	TKO	1 (8)	4 Aug 1999	Tezze sul Brenta, Italy	
41	Win	37–3–1	Benjamin Martinez	PTS	8	17 Apr 1999	Palazzetto dello Sport, Sassari, Italy	
40	Loss	36–3–1	Carlos González	TKO	9 (12)	29 May 1998	Palasport, Pesaro, Italy	Lost WBO light-welterweight title
39	Win	36–2–1	Jose Manuel Berdonce	UD	12	6 Dec 1997	Palasport, Catanzaro, Italy	Retained WBO light-welterweight title
38	Win	35–2–1	Nigel Wenton	RTD	8 (12)	4 Oct 1997	Vibo Valentia, Italy	Retained WBO light-welterweight title
37	Win	34–2–1	Harold Miller	TKO	8 (12)	19 Apr 1997	PalaLido, Milan, Italy	Retained WBO light-welterweight title
36	Win	33–2–1	Sergio Rey	KO	4 (12)	12 Oct 1996	Forum, Assago, Italy	Retained WBO light-welterweight title
35	Draw	32–2–1	Carlos González	SD	12	20 Jun 1996	Forum, Assago, Italy	Retained WBO light-welterweight title
34	Win	32–2	Sammy Fuentes	TKO	8 (12)	9 Mar 1996	PalaLido, Milan, Italy	Won WBO light-welterweight title
33	Win	31–2	Hector Ulises Chong	TKO	7 (10)	16 Dec 1995	Voghera, Italy	
32	Win	30–2	Angel Fernandez	KO	5 (10)	14 Jul 1995	Sheraton Golfo Parco de' Medici, Rome, Italy	
31	Loss	29–2	Julio César Chávez	UD	12	8 Apr 1995	Caesars Palace, Paradise, Nevada, U.S.	For WBC light-welterweight title
30	Win	29–1	Freddie Pendleton	SD	10	17 Sep 1994	MGM Grand Garden Arena, Paradise, Nevada, U.S.	
29	Win	28–1	Richie Hess	KO	2 (10)	7 May 1994	MGM Grand Garden Arena, Paradise, Nevada, U.S.	
28	Win	27–1	Mike Bryan	TKO	1 (10)	29 Jan 1994	MGM Grand Garden Arena, Paradise, Nevada, U.S.	
27	Win	26–1	Antonio Rivera	UD	12	24 Sep 1993	PalaEur, Rome, Italy	Retained WBO lightweight title
26	Win	25–1	Jesus Rojas	TKO	5 (10)	30 Jul 1993	Salò, Italy	
25	Win	24–1	Michael Ayers	UD	12	16 Apr 1993	PalaEur, Rome, Italy	Retained WBO lightweight title
24	Win	23–1	Mark Smith	KO	4 (10)	13 Jan 1993	Sanremo, Italy	
23	Win	22–1	Francisco Javier Altamirano	TKO	10 (12)	25 Sep 1992	Stadio di Voghera, Voghera, Italy	Won vacant WBO lightweight title
22	Win	21–1	Fernando Ramos	KO	4 (?)	10 Jun 1992	Godiasco Salice Terme, Italy	
21	Win	20–1	Wanerge Acosta	TKO	6 (8)	11 Apr 1992	Terni, Italy	
20	Win	19–1	Silvestre Castillo	TKO	7 (?)	14 Mar 1992	Arezzo, Italy	
19	Win	18–1	Martin Cruz	KO	3 (?)	15 Feb 1992	Lumezzane, Italy	
18	Win	17–1	Tony Foster	KO	6 (8)	21 Nov 1991	Palazzo Dello Sport, Perugia, Italy	
17	Win	16–1	Stefano Cassi	KO	2 (12)	28 Sep 1991	Veroli, Italy	Won vacant Italian lightweight title
16	Win	15–1	Rudi Valentino	UD	8	17 Jul 1991	Abbiategrasso, Italy	
15	Win	14–1	Marvin P Gray	KO	6 (8)	15 May 1991	Montichiari, Italy	
14	Win	13–1	Alan Peacock	PTS	6	27 Mar 1991	Mestre, Italy	
13	Loss	12–1	Antonio Rivera	KO	3 (?)	10 Nov 1990	Monsano, Italy	
12	Win	12–0	Tony Richards	PTS	8	10 Mar 1990	Priolo Gargallo, Italy	
11	Win	11–0	Roberto Rubaldino	TKO	1 (10)	6 Jan 1990	Druzhba Multipurpose Arena, Moscow, Russia	
10	Win	10–0	Brian Brown	PTS	8	27 Oct 1989	Saint-Vincent, Italy	
9	Win	9–0	Alain Bamba	TKO	5 (?)	13 Sep 1989	Godiasco Salice Terme, Italy	
8	Win	8–0	Higinio DeLeon	RTD	5 (?)	20 Aug 1989	Terracina, Italy	
7	Win	7–0	Gary Gamble	KO	2 (?)	9 Aug 1989	Anagni, Italy	
6	Win	6–0	Phil Carter	TKO	6 (?)	15 Jul 1989	Trump's Castle, Atlantic City, New Jersey, U.S.	
5	Win	5–0	Bobby Moore	TKO	1 (?)	10 Jun 1989	Palazzo Dello Sport, Frosinone, Italy	
4	Win	4–0	Tchoza Mukuta	PTS	6	22 Apr 1989	Perugia, Italy	
3	Win	3–0	Benito Rodriguez	KO	3 (?)	29 Mar 1989	Cariati, Italy	
2	Win	2–0	Richard Campbell	KO	2 (?)	11 Mar 1989	Acqui Terme, Italy	
1	Win	1–0	Kenny Brown	KO	3 (?)	15 Feb 1989	Vibo Valentia, Italy	

== Titles in boxing ==
=== Major world titles ===
- WBO lightweight champion (135 lbs)
- WBO light-welterweight champion (140 lbs)

=== Regional/International titles ===
- Italian lightweight champion (135 lbs)

== Death ==
On 25 March 2009, Parisi was driving a car at Voghera, near Pavia, when it crashed head-on with a truck. Parisi died at the scene; he was 41.

== See also ==
- List of world lightweight boxing champions
- List of world light-welterweight boxing champions

Sporting positions
Regional boxing titles
Vacant Title last held by Antonio Renzo	Italian lightweight champion 28 September 1991 – 25 September 1992; Won world title	Vacant Title next held by Antonio Strabello
World boxing titles
Vacant Title last held by Dingaan Thobela	WBO lightweight champion 25 September 1992 – 23 January 1994; Vacated	Vacant Title next held by Oscar De La Hoya
Preceded by Sammy Fuentes	WBO light-welterweight champion 9 March 1996 – 29 May 1998	Succeeded by Carlos González
light-welterweight status
Preceded by Edwin Rosario	Latest born world champion to die 25 March 2009 – 11 July 2009	Succeeded by Arturo Gatti
