= Jimmy Paul =

American boxer

Personal information
- Nickname: The Ringmaster
- Nationality: American
- Height: 5 ft 9 in (175 cm)
- Weight: Lightweight; Light welterweight

Boxing career
- Reach: 72 in (183 cm)
- Stance: Orthodox

Boxing record
- Total fights: 39
- Wins: 33
- Win by KO: 24
- Losses: 6

Jimmy Paul is a former professional boxer in the lightweight division.

== Professional career ==
He became International Boxing Federation world Lightweight champion in 1985 when he beat Harry Arroyo by a 15 round unanimous decision. He would defend the title three times including against Darryl Tyson, before losing it to Greg Haugen, also by 15 round decision.

== Professional boxing record ==
39 fights	33 wins	6 losses
By knockout	24	4
By decision	9	2

No.	Result	Record	Opponent	Type	Round, time	Date	Location	Notes
39	Win	33–6	Ali Kareem Muhammad	UD	8	Oct 28, 1999	Hollywood Casino, Aurora, Illinois, U.S.	
38	Loss	32–6	Kenneth Gould	RTD	4 (10)	Aug 27, 1993	Charlotte Memorial Auditorium, Punta Gorda, Florida, U.S.	
37	Loss	32–5	Carlos González	TKO	2 (12)	Jun 29, 1992	Great Western Forum, Inglewood, California, U.S.	For vacant WBO light welterweight title
36	Win	32–4	Bernard Gray	TKO	6 (10)	Apr 21, 1992	The Palace, Auburn Hills, Michigan, U.S.	
35	Win	31–4	Todd Foster	TKO	7 (10)	Feb 7, 1992	Boardwalk Hall, Atlantic City, New Jersey, U.S.	
34	Win	30–4	Higinio DeLeon	TKO	1 (?)	Dec 11, 1991	Duluth, Minnesota, U.S.	
33	Win	29–4	Refugio Guerrero	UD	10	Oct 12, 1991	Lampkin Gym, Maryville, Missouri, U.S.	
32	Win	28–4	Juan Carlos Nunez	KO	2 (?)	Sep 21, 1991	Convention Center, Washington, D.C., U.S.	
31	Win	27–4	Martin Cruz	TKO	5 (?)	Aug 24, 1991	Shawnee State University, Portsmouth, Ohio, U.S.	
30	Loss	26–4	Othal Dixon	KO	4 (10)	Oct 17, 1987	Harrah's Marina Hotel Casino, Atlantic City, New Jersey, U.S.	
29	Loss	26–3	Amancio Castro	KO	2 (?)	Apr 30, 1987	Cobo Arena, Detroit, Michigan, U.S.	
28	Loss	26–2	Greg Haugen	MD	15	Dec 5, 1986	Caesars Palace, Paradise, Nevada, U.S.	Lost IBF lightweight title
27	Win	26–1	Darryl Tyson	UD	15	Aug 15, 1986	Cobo Arena, Detroit, Michigan, U.S.	Retained IBF lightweight title
26	Win	25–1	Irleis Perez	MD	15	Jun 4, 1986	Meadowlands Arena, East Rutherford, New Jersey, U.S.	Retained IBF lightweight title
25	Win	24–1	Freddie Pendleton	UD	10	Nov 20, 1985	Resorts Casino Hotel, Atlantic City, New Jersey, U.S.	
24	Win	23–1	Robin Blake	TKO	14 (15)	Jun 30, 1985	Tropicana Hotel & Casino, Paradise, Nevada, U.S.	Retained IBF lightweight title
23	Win	22–1	Harry Arroyo	UD	15	Apr 6, 1985	Bally's Park Place, Atlantic City, New Jersey, U.S.	Won IBF lightweight title
22	Win	21–1	Idelmar Jose Paisan	UD	10	Jan 12, 1985	Concorde Boxing Arena, Oranjestad, Aruba	
21	Win	20–1	Dwight Pratchett	UD	10	Sep 27, 1984	Cobo Hall, Detroit, Michigan, U.S.	
20	Win	19–1	Alvin Hayes	KO	6 (12)	Jun 15, 1984	Caesars Palace, Paradise, Nevada, U.S.	Retained USBA lightweight title
19	Win	18–1	Richard Fowler	TKO	9 (12)	Feb 11, 1984	Joe Louis Arena, Detroit, Michigan, U.S.	
18	Loss	17–1	Darryl Tyson	SD	10	Oct 11, 1983	Tropicana Hotel & Casino, Atlantic City, New Jersey, U.S.	
17	Win	17–0	Andrew Ganigan	TKO	6 (12)	Jun 12, 1983	Graham Central Station, Phoenix, Arizona, U.S.	Won vacant USBA lightweight title
16	Win	16–0	Pat Duran	TKO	6 (10)	Dec 3, 1982	Superdome, New Orleans, Louisiana, U.S.	
15	Win	15–0	Jorge Morales	TKO	4 (10)	Oct 10, 1982	Cobo Arena, Detroit, Michigan, U.S.	
14	Win	14–0	Tyrone Lee	TKO	1 (10)	Sep 4, 1982	Cobo Hall, Detroit, Michigan, U.S.	
13	Win	13–0	Darrell Stovall	TKO	7 (10)	May 20, 1982	Fairgrounds Youth Center, Phoenix, Arizona, U.S.	
12	Win	12–0	Jerome Artis	UD	10	Apr 29, 1982	Sands Casino Hotel, Atlantic City, New Jersey, U.S.	
11	Win	11–0	Roberto Garcia	TKO	4 (10)	Apr 20, 1982	Fairgrounds Youth Center, Phoenix, Arizona, U.S.	
10	Win	10–0	Sergio Aguirre	KO	5 (10)	Mar 16, 1982	Fairgrounds Youth Center, Phoenix, Arizona, U.S.	
9	Win	9–0	Salvador Ugalde	KO	4 (10)	Jan 28, 1982	Fairgrounds Youth Center, Phoenix, Arizona, U.S.	
8	Win	8–0	Jerome McKinney	TKO	2 (6)	Jan 23, 1982	Cobo Hall, Detroit, Michigan, U.S.	
7	Win	7–0	Chico Rodriguez	TKO	1 (6)	Nov 19, 1981	Cobo Hall, Detroit, Michigan, U.S.	
6	Win	6–0	Jerome McKinney	TKO	2 (6)	Sep 10, 1981	The 20 Grand, Detroit, Michigan, U.S.	
5	Win	5–0	Billy Madison	KO	2 (6)	Jul 9, 1981	The 20 Grand, Detroit, Michigan, U.S.	
4	Win	4–0	Antonio Rutledge	TKO	2 (6)	May 14, 1981	Cobo Hall, Detroit, Michigan, U.S.	
3	Win	3–0	Clinton Harris	TKO	4 (6)	Mar 13, 1981	Civic Center, Lansing, Michigan, U.S.	
2	Win	2–0	Cedric Barkley	KO	1 (6)	Dec 12, 1980	Cobo Hall, Detroit, Michigan, U.S.	
1	Win	1–0	Ken Reed	TKO	5 (6)	Oct 23, 1980	Cobo Arena, Detroit, Michigan, U.S.	

== See also ==
- Kronk Gym
- List of world lightweight boxing champions

Sporting positions
Regional boxing titles
Vacant Title last held by Roger Mayweather	USBA lightweight champion June 12, 1983 – April 6, 1985; Won world title	Vacant Title next held by Terrence Alli
World boxing titles
Preceded by Harry Arroyo	IBF lightweight champion April 6, 1985 – December 5, 1986	Succeeded by Greg Haugen
