= Paradise Casino =

Casino in Yuma, Arizona

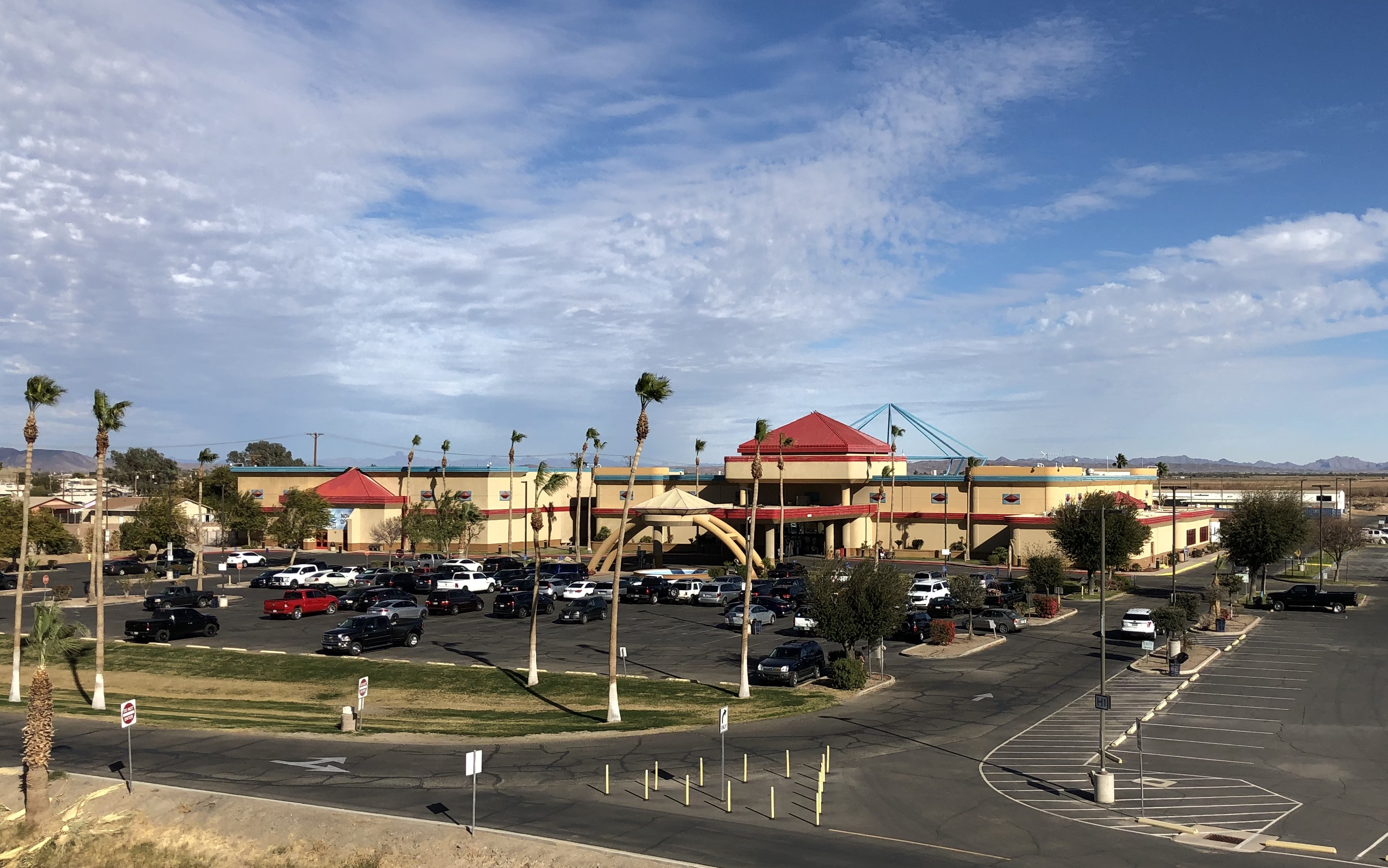
- Interactive map of Paradise Casino
- Location: Yuma, Arizona; 450 Quechan Drive; 32.734371°N 114.613377°W
- Opened: July 31, 1996
- Notable restaurants: The Cove
- Casino type: Tribal
- Owner: Fort Yuma Quechan Tribe
- Renovated in: 2011
- Website: paradise-casinos.com

Paradise Casino is a small tribal casino located just outside of Yuma, Arizona on the Fort Yuma Indian Reservation. The property straddles the Arizona–California state line, but the casino building lies in Arizona. It is owned and operated by the Quechan Tribe of the Fort Yuma Indian Reservation.

== History ==
In 1993, the Quechan tribe signed a compact with the state of Arizona to allow construction of a casino with 475 slot machines. Construction began in January 1996. The casino opened to tribe members on July 31, 1996, and opened to the general public the next day. It was built at a cost of $13 million.

In 1999, the tribe negotiated a compact with the state of California to open a casino on the other side of the state line, seven feet away from the existing casino. Operating in California would allow the casino to offer blackjack, which was not allowed under Arizona gaming compacts at the time. The extra space would also reduce crowding in the existing casino. Construction of the California casino began in February 2002. It opened on December 20, 2002, with 20 blackjack tables and 200 slot machines. The two casinos were jointly operated as Paradise Casino Arizona and Paradise Casino California.

In 2009, Paradise Casino California was closed, as the tribe's California gaming operation was transferred to the newly constructed Quechan Casino Resort, seven miles to the west. The new casino resort was expected to draw away tourist traffic, leaving Paradise Casino Arizona as more of a locals casino. Paradise Casino California was then converted into an 800-seat event venue, the Paradise Event Center, which opened with a Lonestar concert in June 2009.

A major renovation of the Paradise Casino was completed in 2011.
