= Rico Tan =

Canadian boxer

Rico "Juice" Tan (born February 26, 1978, in Toronto, Ontario) was a Canadian welterweight boxer of Chinese Indonesian descent from 2000 to 2003. Tan retired with a 12-2-2 (11 ko's) professional boxing record. Tan now owns a Hawaiian BBQ food truck and catering company named "Liko's Hawaiian Barbecue".
