= Vince Phillips =

American boxer

Personal information
- Nickname: Cool
- Born: Vincent Edwards Phillips; July 23, 1963 (age 63) Pensacola, Florida, U.S.
- Height: 5 ft 7 1/2 in (171 cm)
- Weight: Light welterweight; Welterweight; Light middleweight

Boxing career
- Reach: 70 in (178 cm)
- Stance: Orthodox

Boxing record
- Total fights: 61
- Wins: 48
- Win by KO: 34
- Losses: 12
- Draws: 1

Vincent Edwards "Vince" Phillips (born July 23, 1963) is an American former professional boxer who competed from 1989 to 2007. He held the IBF junior welterweight title from 1997 to 1999, notably scoring an upset victory against then-undefeated Kostya Tszyu to become champion.

== Amateur career ==
As an amateur, Phillips won the U.S. National Golden Gloves in 1985, and the U.S. National Championships in 1985 and 1986, all in the lightweight division.

== Professional career ==
Phillips made his professional debut on February 28, 1989, stopping Octavio Guardado in two rounds. He would win his next 27 fights until losing to Anthony Jones November 18, 1993, due to cuts in the seventh round. On April 12, 1996, Phillips made his first world title challenge by facing WBA welterweight champion Ike Quartey, but was stopped in three rounds. A year later, on May 31, 1997, he scored a major upset by defeating then-unbeaten world champion Kostya Tszyu to win the IBF junior welterweight title, which was named the Upset of the Year by The Ring magazine. Phillips made three successful title defenses throughout 1997 and 1998, until a fifth-round stoppage loss to Terron Millett on February 20, 1999. He would fight for another eight years, albeit never again for a world title, and ended his career with a ten-round unanimous decision loss to Alisultan Nadirbegov on May 6, 2007.

== Professional boxing record ==
61 fights	48 wins	12 losses
By knockout	34	4
By decision	14	8
Draws	1	

No.	Result	Record	Opponent	Type	Round, time	Date	Location	Notes
61	Loss	48–12–1	Alisultan Nadirbegov	UD	10	May 6, 2007	Arsenal Stadium, Tula, Russia	
60	Loss	48–11–1	Jesús Soto Karass	RTD	9 (12), 3:00	Jun 2, 2006	Envy Nightclub, Tucson, Arizona, U.S.	Lost WBC Continental Americas welterweight title
59	Loss	48–10–1	Jesse Feliciano	MD	10	Mar 17, 2006	The Roxy, Boston, Massachusetts, U.S.	
58	Win	48–9–1	Kelson Pinto	TD	5 (12), 3:00	Oct 13, 2005	Convention Center, Ontario, California, U.S.	Retained WBC Continental Americas welterweight title; Majority TD after Phillips was cut from an accidental head clash
57	Win	47–9–1	Mauro Lucero	KO	2 (12), 2:05	Jun 3, 2005	Poliforo Juan Gabriel, Ciudad Juárez, Mexico	Won WBC Continental Americas welterweight title
56	Loss	46–9–1	Alex Bunema	SD	12	Mar 24, 2005	Coeur d'Alene Casino Resort Hotel, Worley, Idaho, U.S.	For WBC Continental Americas super welterweight title
55	Win	46–8–1	Dumont Welliver	TD	8 (10), 3:00	Nov 4, 2004	Coeur d'Alene Casino Resort Hotel, Worley, Idaho, U.S.	Unanimous TD after Phillips could not continue from an accidental head clash
54	Win	45–8–1	Paulino Avitia	TKO	5 (8)	Jul 23, 2004	Warnors Theatre, Fresno, California, U.S.	
53	Loss	44–8–1	Ricky Hatton	UD	12	Apr 5, 2003	MEN Arena, Manchester, England	For WBU light welterweight title
52	Loss	44–7–1	Sharmba Mitchell	MD	10	Nov 9, 2002	Coca-Cola Event Center, Oklahoma City, Oklahoma, U.S.	
51	Win	44–6–1	Nick Acevedo	UD	10	Mar 29, 2002	Paris Las Vegas, Paradise, Nevada, U.S.	
50	Win	43–6–1	Carlito Brosas	TKO	3 (10), 2:19	Nov 3, 2001	MGM Grand Garden Arena, Paradise, Nevada, U.S.	
49	Win	42–6–1	Marlon Haynes	TKO	7 (10), 2:12	Jun 23, 2001	Mohegan Sun Arena, Montville, Connecticut, U.S.	
48	Loss	41–6–1	Ray Oliveira	MD	12	Dec 22, 2000	Foxwoods Resort Casino, Ledyard, Connecticut, U.S.	For vacant NABF light welterweight title
47	Win	41–5–1	Pedro Saiz	TKO	5 (10), 3:00	Aug 31, 2000	Grand Casino, Tunica, Mississippi, U.S.	
46	Draw	40–5–1	Ricky Quiles	PTS	12	Apr 29, 2000	Lafayette, Louisiana, U.S.	For WBO–NABO light welterweight title
45	Loss	40–5	Vernon Forrest	UD	12	Jan 22, 2000	The Joint, Paradise, Nevada, U.S.	For NABF welterweight title
44	Win	40–4	Angel Beltre	KO	3 (10), 1:33	Dec 10, 1999	Grand Casino, Biloxi, Mississippi, U.S.	
43	Loss	39–4	Terron Millett	TKO	5 (12), 1:58	Feb 20, 1999	Madison Square Garden, New York City, New York, U.S.	Lost IBF light welterweight title
42	Win	39–3	Alfonso Sanchez	KO	1 (12), 2:30	Mar 14, 1998	Etess Arena, Atlantic City, New Jersey, U.S.	Retained IBF light welterweight title
41	Win	38–3	Freddie Pendleton	TKO	10 (12), 0:41	Dec 13, 1997	Amphitheater, Pompano Beach, Florida, U.S.	Retained IBF light welterweight title
40	Win	37–3	Micky Ward	TKO	3 (12), 2:49	Aug 9, 1997	The Roxy, Boston, Massachusetts, U.S.	Retained IBF light welterweight title
39	Win	36–3	Kostya Tszyu	TKO	10 (12), 1:22	May 31, 1997	Etess Arena, Atlantic City, New Jersey, U.S.	Won IBF light welterweight title
38	Loss	35–3	Romallis Ellis	SD	10	Jan 11, 1997	Hynes Convention Center, Boston, Massachusetts, U.S.	
37	Win	35–2	Juan Carlos Rodriguez	TKO	5 (10)	Oct 28, 1996	Great Western Forum, Inglewood, California, U.S.	
36	Win	34–2	Jerry Smith	RTD	3 (10), 3:00	Jun 16, 1996	Casino Magic, Bay St. Louis, Mississippi, U.S.	
35	Loss	33–2	Ike Quartey	TKO	3 (12), 2:31	Apr 12, 1996	Atlantis Casino, Sint Maarten, Netherlands Antilles	For WBA welterweight title
34	Win	33–1	Mauro Gutierrez	KO	3 (10), 1:35	Oct 28, 1995	Caesars Palace, Paradise, Nevada, U.S.	
33	Win	32–1	Omar Flores	TKO	1 (10), 2:19	Sep 25, 1995	Great Western Forum, Inglewood, California, U.S.	
32	Win	31–1	Jaime Balboa	UD	10	Jul 24, 1995	Great Western Forum, Inglewood, California, U.S.	
31	Win	30–1	Rene Francisco Herrera	UD	10	May 22, 1995	Great Western Forum, Inglewood, California, U.S.	
30	Win	29–1	Jose Flores	TKO	4 (10), 2:51	Dec 3, 1994	Caesars Palace, Paradise, Nevada, U.S.	
29	Loss	28–1	Anthony Jones	TKO	7 (10), 1:16	Nov 18, 1993	The Palace, Auburn Hills, Michigan, U.S.	
28	Win	28–0	Walid Underwood	UD	8	Sep 24, 1993	Parkers Ballroom, Seattle, Washington, U.S.	
27	Win	27–0	Julio Flores	TKO	1 (10), 2:50	Jan 16, 1993	Convention Center, Reno, Nevada, U.S.	
26	Win	26–0	Juan Soberanes	KO	6 (10)	Jul 23, 1992	Sports Arena, San Diego, California, U.S.	
25	Win	25–0	Tyrone Downes	TKO	7 (10), 1:01	Jun 11, 1992	Broadway by the Bay Theater, Atlantic City, New Jersey, U.S.	
24	Win	24–0	Harold Brazier	UD	12	Apr 9, 1992	Bally's Las Vegas, Paradise, Nevada, U.S.	Won IBF Inter-Continental light welterweight title
23	Win	23–0	Tim Brooks	TKO	3 (10)	Jan 26, 1992	Adam's Mark Hotel, Indianapolis, Indiana, U.S.	
22	Win	22–0	Jesus Rojas	TKO	6 (8), 2:01	Dec 7, 1991	Convention Center, Reno, Nevada, U.S.	
21	Win	21–0	David Taylor	PTS	10	May 10, 1991	John O'Donnell Stadium, Davenport, Iowa, U.S.	
20	Win	20–0	Mike Johnson	TKO	5 (10), 1:18	Apr 7, 1991	Bally's Las Vegas, Paradise, Nevada, U.S.	
19	Win	19–0	Benjie Marquez	TKO	4 (8), 2:18	Feb 15, 1991	Caesars Palace, Paradise, Nevada, U.S.	
18	Win	18–0	Tim Bonds	UD	8	Jan 6, 1991	Civic Center, Bismarck, North Dakota, U.S.	
17	Win	17–0	Victorio Belcher	SD	10	Nov 29, 1990	Horizon Lake Tahoe, Stateline, Nevada, U.S.	
16	Win	16–0	Derrick McGuire	TKO	2 (8), 1:12	Oct 11, 1990	Bally's Las Vegas, Paradise, Nevada, U.S.	
15	Win	15–0	William Hernandez	TKO	6 (8), 0:32	Jul 27, 1990	Bally's Las Vegas, Paradise, Nevada, U.S.	
14	Win	14–0	Terry Ford	UD	8	Jun 15, 1990	Bally's Las Vegas, Paradise, Nevada, U.S.	
13	Win	13–0	Martin Quiroz	TKO	5 (8), 2:46	May 24, 1990	Bally's Las Vegas, Paradise, Nevada, U.S.	
12	Win	12–0	Heriberto Ruiz	TKO	4 (6), 1:43	Apr 12, 1990	Harrah's Lake Tahoe, Stateline, Nevada, U.S.	
11	Win	11–0	Howard Stewart	SD	6	Jan 12, 1990	Trump Plaza Hotel and Casino, Atlantic City, New Jersey, U.S.	
10	Win	10–0	Santos Moreno	UD	4	Dec 7, 1989	The Mirage, Paradise, Nevada, U.S.	
9	Win	9–0	Dwayne Peterson	TKO	7 (8), 2:46	Nov 21, 1989	Showboat Hotel and Casino, Las Vegas, Nevada, U.S.	
8	Win	8–0	Jose Luis Nino	KO	1 (4), 2:30	Oct 10, 1989	Bally's Las Vegas, Paradise, Nevada, U.S.	
7	Win	7–0	Jorge Hernandez	UD	6	Aug 29, 1989	Showboat Hotel and Casino, Las Vegas, Nevada, U.S.	
6	Win	6–0	Jorge Rivera	TKO	5 (6), 1:55	Aug 1, 1989	Showboat Hotel and Casino, Las Vegas, Nevada, U.S.	
5	Win	5–0	John Edwards	KO	2 (4), 0:45	Jul 18, 1989	Showboat Hotel and Casino, Las Vegas, Nevada, U.S.	
4	Win	4–0	Jose Luis Gonzalez	KO	1 (4), 2:09	Jun 27, 1989	Showboat Hotel and Casino, Las Vegas, Nevada, U.S.	
3	Win	3–0	Ricardo Luna	KO	1 (4), 1:08	May 16, 1989	Tyndall Armory, Indianapolis, Indiana, U.S.	
2	Win	2–0	Enrique Ventura	KO	1 (4), 0:58	Apr 25, 1989	Showboat Hotel and Casino, Las Vegas, Nevada, U.S.	
1	Win	1–0	Octavio Guardado	TKO	2 (4), 1:14	Feb 28, 1989	Showboat Hotel and Casino, Las Vegas, Nevada, U.S.	

Sporting positions
Regional boxing titles
Previous: Marvin Chambers	U.S. Golden Gloves lightweight champion 1985	Next: Lavell Finger
Previous: Victor Levine	U.S. lightweight champion 1985, 1986	Next: Charles Murray
Regional boxing titles
Preceded by Harold Brazier	IBF Inter-Continental light welterweight champion April 9, 1992 – July 1992; Vacated	Vacant Title next held by Pedro Padilla Estrada
Preceded by Mauro Lucero	WBC Continental Americas welterweight champion March 24, 2005 – June 2, 2006	Succeeded by Jesús Soto Karass
World boxing titles
Preceded by Kostya Tszyu	IBF light welterweight champion May 31, 1997 – 20 February 1999	Succeeded by Terron Millett
Awards
Previous: Evander Holyfield; TKO11 Mike Tyson	The Ring Upset of the Year; TKO10 Kostya Tszyu; 1997	Next: Ivan Robinson; SD10 Arturo Gatti
Previous: Danny Romero	The Ring Comeback of the Year; 1997	Next: Kostya Tszyu
