= Loreto Garza =

American boxer (born 1962)

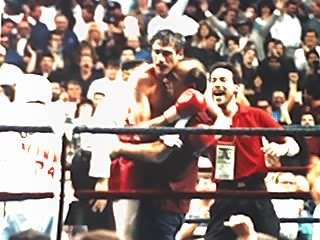
- Image of Loreto Garza, the former world champion of light welterweight

Personal information
- Nationality: American
- Born: May 23, 1962 (age 64) Sacramento, California, U.S.
- Height: 5 ft 10 in (178 cm)
- Weight: Light welterweight

Boxing career
- Reach: 72 in (183 cm)
- Stance: Orthodox

Boxing record
- Total fights: 34
- Wins: 31
- Win by KO: 26
- Losses: 2
- Draws: 1

Loreto Garza (born May 23, 1962 in Sacramento, California) is an American former professional boxer and world champion at light welterweight.

== Career ==
=== Amateur ===
Garza started boxing amateur at 18 years old and did it for three years. He won the Golden Gloves all three years, along with other big tournaments and was also on the U.S. boxing team.

=== Professional ===
Garza turned pro in 1982 at the age of 21. Working his way up the ranks, he got his opportunity. In 1988, Garza won the WBC Americas light welterweight championship with a spectacular first-round knockout of former world champion Harry Arroyo. Arroyo was knocked down three times in the fight. Later on that year, Garza knocked out former world champion Charlie Brown (other wise known as "Choo Choo" Brown) in four rounds.

In 1989, Garza, with a single right hand in the 7th round, knocked out former world champion Joe Manley. Manley was out cold. A couple of months later on August 12, 1989, Garza won a unanimous decision in a 12-round war to win the USBA championship over #1 ranked contender Frankie Warren; Garza fought the last five rounds with his left eye swelled shut. Many boxing annals argue that Garza vs. Warren should have been the fight of the year.

On August 17, 1990, with only two weeks notice, Garza flew to Nice, France, and won the WBA light welterweight world title by majority decision over the reigning three-time world champion Juan Coggi. Garza looked sharp with a beautiful display of counter punching. He came back to his hometown of Sacramento and defended his world title against former five-time world champion Vinny Pazienza. Garza out-smarted and out-boxed Pazienza and had his face bloody and battered. Pazienza was frustrated throughout the fight and in the 11th round, Pazienza picked up Garza and tried to slam him in the ring, so the referee disqualified Pazienza. The following year, Garza lost the belt to Edwin Rosario via 3rd round TKO. Garza was down twice the first and twice in the third round.

Garza had three more fights after that and won them by knockout, and was promised another world title shot, but it seemed like all the world champions would duck when it came to Garza. He retired in 1993.

As a main event fighter, Garza also headlined two pay-per-view fights.

== Professional boxing record ==
34 fights	31 wins	2 losses
By knockout	26	2
By decision	4	0
By disqualification	1	0
Draws	1	

No.	Result	Record	Opponent	Type	Round, time	Date	Location	Notes
34	Win	31–2–1	Gilberto Flores	TKO	8 (10)	1993-03-25	Radisson Hotel, Sacramento, California, U.S.	
33	Win	30–2–1	Tony Contreras	KO	2 (10)	1992-09-30	Radisson Hotel, Sacramento, California, U.S.	
32	Win	29–2–1	Alberto Castro	KO	7 (10)	1991-11-15	ARCO Arena, Sacramento, California, U.S.	
31	Loss	28–2–1	Edwin Rosario	TKO	3 (12)	1991-06-14	ARCO Arena, Sacramento, California, U.S.	Lost WBA super lightweight title
30	Win	28–1–1	Vinny Pazienza	DQ	11 (12)	1990-12-01	ARCO Arena, Sacramento, California, U.S.	Retained WBA super lightweight title
29	Win	27–1–1	Juan Martin Coggi	MD	12 (12)	1990-08-17	Palais des Congrès Acropolis, Nice, France	Won WBA super lightweight title
28	Win	26–1–1	Rosenberg Rosas	KO	5 (10)	1990-02-05	ARCO Arena, Sacramento, California, U.S.	
27	Win	25–1–1	Frankie Warren	UD	12 (12)	1989-08-12	ARCO Arena, Sacramento, California, U.S.	
26	Win	24–1–1	Francisco Tomas da Cruz	TKO	4 (10)	1989-05-15	Radisson Hotel, Sacramento, California, U.S.	
25	Win	23–1–1	Manuel Nery	KO	2 (10)	1989-03-05	ARCO Arena, Sacramento, California, U.S.	
24	Win	22–1–1	Joe Manley	KO	7 (10)	1989-01-25	ARCO Arena, Sacramento, California, U.S.	
23	Win	21–1–1	Stewart Baynes	TKO	9 (10)	1988-07-23	ARCO Arena, Sacramento, California, U.S.	
22	Win	20–1–1	Harry Arroyo	TKO	1 (12)	1988-04-22	ARCO Arena, Sacramento, California, U.S.	Won WBC Continental Americas super lightweight title
21	Win	19–1–1	Charlie Brown	TKO	4 (10)	1988-02-12	ARCO Arena, Sacramento, California, U.S.	
20	Win	18–1–1	Javier Juarez	TKO	1 (10)	1987-09-25	ARCO Arena, Sacramento, California, U.S.	
19	Win	17–1–1	Amy Pacana	KO	1 (10)	1987-09-01	ARCO Arena, Sacramento, California, U.S.	
18	Win	16–1–1	Gary Williams	TKO	1 (10)	1987-07-01	ARCO Arena, Sacramento, California, U.S.	
17	Win	15–1–1	Willie Montana	TKO	6 (10)	1987-05-21	ARCO Arena, Sacramento, California, U.S.	
16	Win	14–1–1	Mauricio Nava	KO	1 (6)	1987-03-09	ARCO Arena, Sacramento, California, U.S.	
15	Win	13–1–1	Roberto Garcia	KO	7 (8)	1986-09-27	Caesars Tahoe, Stateline, Nevada, U.S.	
14	Win	12–1–1	Roberto Garcia	TKO	2 (6)	1986-07-20	Caesars Tahoe, Stateline, Nevada, U.S.	
13	Win	11–1–1	Erwin Brown	KO	3 (8)	1986-06-05	ARCO Arena, Sacramento, California, U.S.	
12	Win	10–1–1	Chauncey Hayes	UD	8 (8)	1986-02-23	Auditorium, Richmond, California, U.S.	
11	Win	9–1–1	Rene Hedman	TKO	1 (6)	1985-08-15	Memorial Auditorium, Sacramento, California, U.S.	
10	Draw	8–1–1	Ernie Landeros	PTS	6 (6)	1985-06-18	Memorial Auditorium, Sacramento, California, U.S.	
9	Win	8–1	Mario Lopez	TKO	2 (6)	1984-07-03	Memorial Auditorium, Sacramento, California, U.S.	
8	Win	7–1	Jerry Lewis	KO	3 (6)	1984-04-03	Memorial Auditorium, Sacramento, California, U.S.	
7	Win	6–1	Peter Cunningham	SD	6 (6)	1984-03-06	Memorial Auditorium, Sacramento, California, U.S.	
6	Loss	5–1	Francisco Tomas da Cruz	TKO	4 (6)	1983-11-15	Memorial Auditorium, Sacramento, California, U.S.	
5	Win	5–0	Jose Resendez	KO	3 (5)	1983-10-25	Memorial Auditorium, Sacramento, California, U.S.	
4	Win	4–0	Howard Smith	KO	4 (?)	1983-10-21	Vallejo, California, U.S.	
3	Win	3–0	Francisco Estrella	KO	1 (6)	1983-06-21	Memorial Auditorium, Sacramento, California, U.S.	
2	Win	2–0	James Sowell	KO	2 (6)	1983-04-05	Memorial Auditorium, Sacramento, California, U.S.	
1	Win	1–0	Don Canada	KO	2 (5)	1983-02-01	Memorial Auditorium, Sacramento, California, U.S.	

== See also ==
- List of world light-welterweight boxing champions

Sporting positions
World boxing titles
Preceded by Juan Martin Coggi	WBA super lightweight champion August 17, 1990 – June 14, 1991	Succeeded by Edwin Rosario
