= Jake Rodríguez =

Puerto Rican boxer

Personal information
- Nationality: Puerto Rican
- Born: October 2, 1965 (age 60) Arroyo, Puerto Rico
- Height: 5 ft 8 in (173 cm)
- Weight: Light welterweight Welterweight; Light middleweight

Boxing career
- Stance: Southpaw

Boxing record
- Total fights: 38
- Wins: 28
- Win by KO: 8
- Losses: 8
- Draws: 2

Evaristo "Jake" Rodríguez (born October 2, 1965) is a Puerto Rican former professional boxer who competed from 1988 to 1997. In 1994 he defeated Charles Murray to become the IBF junior welterweight champion. Two successful defenses of the title were made, until a loss to Kostya Tszyu in 1995. Later that year Rodríguez challenged WBC welterweight champion Pernell Whitaker, but lost via knockout.

Regional titles
Preceded by Charles Murray	IBF junior welterweight champion February 13, 1994 – January 28, 1995	Succeeded by Kostya Tszyu

== See also ==
- List of Puerto Rican boxing world champions
