= Teatro Caupolicán =

Venue in Chile

Coordinates: 33°27′22.38″S 70°38′57.16″W

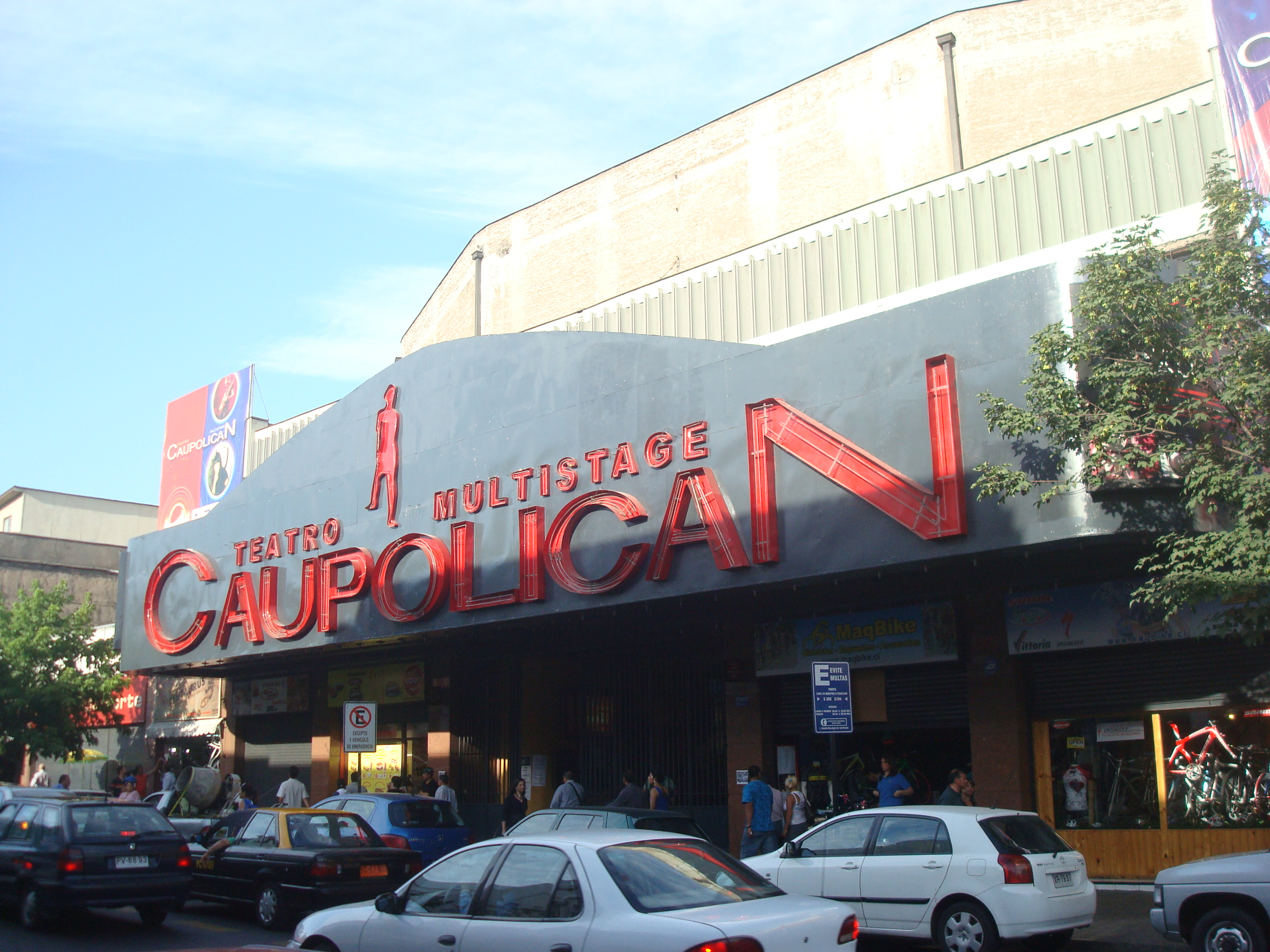
- Interactive map of Teatro Caupolicán
- Former names: Teatro Monumental (1994-2004)
- Location: Santiago, Chile
- Capacity: 4,500

Construction
- Opened: 1936

Teatro Caupolicán (Caupolicán Theatre) is a theatre and music venue located on the San Diego street in Santiago, Chile. It was opened in 1936. During its long history has hosted sporting, political, and cultural events. Currently is an important concert venue for popular Chilean and international artists, with a seating capacity of 4,500 and a total capacity of 5,400 (including standing places).

== History ==
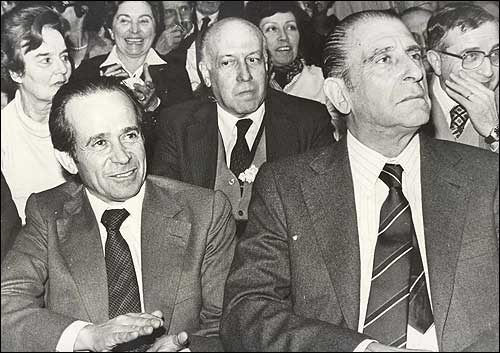
Zaldivar with Eduardo Frei Montalva voting no in the Chilean constitutional referendum of 1980 in the Teatro Caupolicán

The history of Teatro Caupolicán began in 1936, when the Caja de Empleados Públicos (or the resources for public employment), financed the construction of the location for large scale spectacles in Santiago.

The theatre has hosted a wide array of types of events. In 1939 there was an opera program which included The Barber of Seville, Madame Butterfly, and Rigoletto. European symphony orchestras have also performed at the theatre. The Soviet ballet Beriosk came, as well as the Moscow Circus, and the Chinese Circus. Later, the ice skating show Holiday on Ice performed on a number of occasions.

In 1946 women's Chilean basketball won its first South American title there. The theatre hosted boxing events, including fights with Arturo Godoy, Antonio Fernández, Godfrey Stevens, Samuel Serrano defending his WBA world Junior Lightweight title against Benedicto Villablanca, and Martín Vargas.

Teatro Caupolicán has been a political forum in Chilean history as well. Former presidents Arturo Alessandri, Eduardo Frei Montalva and Salvador Allende all held rallies in this theatre. Allende's personal secretary recounts the Unidad Popular's rally held there. Some of these political speeches have been printed and are sold as books.

== Notable performers ==
Nobel prize winning Chilean poet Pablo Neruda once spoke at this theatre. Neruda's speech had some political content criticizing Argentina in 1944. In 1945 Neruda chose the theatre as a place to declare himself a member of the Communist Party.

Enrique Venturino Soto ran the theatre at the beginning of the 1940s.

Venturino also formed the Chilean circus troupe, Las Águilas Humanas (in English, "the human eagles") during an earlier era in which the space was dubbed Teatro Circo (or Circus Theatre) for its circus schedule.

The list of artists who have performed on its stage includes Roxette, Louis Armstrong, Caterina Valente, Duke Ellington, Bill Haley & His Comets, Jorge Negrete, Lucho Gatica, El Indio Araucano, (singer) winner of El Disco De Oro in 1938, Raphael, Lola Flores, Maurice Chevalier, Juliette Gréco, Gojira, Lamb of God, Chito Faró, the New York Philharmonic, Toto, Electric Light Orchestra Part II, Chick Corea, Herbie Hancock, Ghost, Creedence Clearwater Revisited, Green Day, The Ramones, Claudio Arrau and Mexicano 777.

== Bullfighting fiasco ==
Among the most unusual spectacles there was an attempt to hold a bullfight in 1954 with Peruvian-raised bulls. The theatre was prepared for 20 days in order to prepare a bullring, plenty of sand and dirt. Nevertheless, the show was a true fiasco. The bulls, perhaps young ones, according to Chino Allende, remained paralyzed on the floor. And those that moved did so only to raise and throw the abundant sand and dirt at the spectators. "The bulls ate the lenses, the electric lights. They missed the sun, the sky, I have never seen bulls so afraid," said Sergio Venturino in explaining the failure.

== Music venue ==
Other artists that have performed at Teatro Caupolicán include: Air Supply, 2 Minutos, Alice Cooper, All Time Low, An Cafe, Anathema, Avenged Sevenfold, Bad Religion, Beastie Boys, Belinda, Black Rebel Motorcycle Club, Black Veil Brides, Brett Anderson, Bring Me the Horizon, Bruce Dickinson, Cannibal Corpse, Carcass, Chancho en Piedra, Cyndi Lauper, Creed, Creedence Clearwater Revisited, Day6, Death, Deep Purple, Dir En Grey, Epica, Eterna Inocencia, Europe, Faith No More, Fear Factory, Fiskales Ad-Hok, Five (group), Garbage, (G)I-dle, Gojira, Green Day, Gustavo Cerati, Hatebreed, Iron Maiden, Jamiroquai, JYJ, Klaxons, Korn, La Polla Records, Lacuna Coil, Lamb of God, Los Fabulosos Cadillacs, Los Miserables, Mägo de Oz, Marillion, McFLY, Megadeth, Misfits, Motörhead, Mon Laferte, Muse, Nightwish, Noel Gallagher, NOFX, Opeth, Ozzy Osbourne, Panda, Pantera, Paradise Lost, The Ramones, Roxette, Scorpions, Sepultura, Sex Pistols, Simple Plan, Shaila, Slash, Soda Stereo, Sonata Arctica, Steven Wilson, Stryper, Suicidal Tendencies, Symphony X, Tarja Turunen, The Exploited, The Gathering, The Gazette, The Hives, The Kooks, The Rapture, TVXQ, Vamps, Vicentico, WarCry, Within Temptation, X Japan, Yngwie Malmsteen, Emma Shapplin, Ha*Ash, NMIXX, Mexicano 777, among others.

== Bibliography ==
- Sosa Abascal, Arturo (1995). Rómulo Betancourt y el Partido del Pueblo: 1937-1941. Chile: Universidad Católica Andres. p. 618. ISBN 978-980-6191-29-7.
- Gill, Nicolas; Pashby, Christie; Schrek, Kristina (2011). Frommer's Guide to Chile and Easter Island. John Wiley & Sons. p. 480. ISBN 978-1-118-10189-6.
- Pradenas, Luis (2006). Teatro en Chile: Huellas y Trayectorias Siglos XVI-XX. Chile: LOM Ediciones. p. 517. ISBN 9789562827805.
