= Arlene Istar Lev =

American family therapist

- Education: Herkimer County Community College; Binghamton University; University at Albany
- Known for: Clinical social worker, family therapist, educator

Arlene Istar Lev is a North American clinical social worker, family therapist, and educator. She is an independent scholar, who has lectured internationally on topics related to sexual orientation and gender identity, sexuality, and LGBTQ families.

She has been a lecturer at the School of Social Welfare at the State University of New York at Albany since 1988, and is the founder and project director of its Sexual Orientation and Gender Identity Project. Additionally she has been an adjunct professor at Smith College, Empire College, Rockway Institute, California School of Professional Psychology at Alliant International University, Excelsior College, Vermont College, and the Union Institute and University.

Lev has been a practicing psychotherapist and family therapist, and is the founder and clinical director of Choices Counseling and Consulting in Albany, New York. She is the author of the groundbreaking book Transgender Emergence: Therapeutic Guidelines for Working with Gender-Variant People and their Families, as well as The Complete Lesbian and Gay Parenting Guide.

== Early life and education ==
Arlene Lev (née Weinstein) was born and raised in Brooklyn, New York, to a working class Jewish family. She is an only child and was raised partially by her single mother (Mindy), and partially by her grandparents (Ethel and Sam Brown).

She received her associate degree in 1975 from Herkimer County Community College and bachelor's degree in sociology in 1979 from Binghamton University. In 1986, she graduated from the University at Albany with a Master of Social Work degree.

== Career ==
In 1986, Lev founded Choices Counseling and Consulting in Albany, New York's Capital District, to specialize in working with lesbian and gay individuals, couples and families. She is the clinical director of the practice, which focuses on lesbian, gay, bisexual, transgender, queer (LGBTQ) clients and their families. The practice has a goal of keeping therapy affordable for a community that often has suffered from economic hardships. Grounded in feminist family therapy, therapeutic services are directed towards empowerment and authenticity and the nurturing of healthy queer families. In recent years, Choices Counseling and Consulting has expanded, with a staff of eight, as well as working with social work and psychology interns from various local colleges.

Lev is also a CASAC (Crediential Alcoholism and Substance Abuse Counselor).

In 2000 Lev founded the Rainbow Access Initiative, a training program on LGBTQ issues for therapists and medical professionals in the Capital Region of New York. She was the first project director, and wrote the original proposal for the project, which was funded through grants from the New York State Department of Health. She served as Project Manager from 2000 through 2004 and Lead Trainer & Consultant from 2000 through 2008.

As Lev began to work with transgender clients and their families in the mid-1980s, she realized that her training had prepared her inadequately for dealing with issues in sexuality, sexual practices and gender. In 2004, after many years of working in this field, she published her first book, Transgender Emergence: Therapeutic Guidelines for Working with Gender-Variant People and their Families. In 2006, the book won an American Psychological Association (Division 44) Distinguished Book Award for its large contribution to a sparsely covered area, and for being "filled with clinical wisdom and understanding." It was chosen as a 2006 book of "Exceptional Merit" by the Society for Sex Therapy and Research. The book is encyclopedic, and became required reading for social workers and mental health counselors working with transgender people. It was called groundbreaking for outlining the shift toward a collaborative model of treatment.

Lev is project director of the Sexual Orientation and Gender Identity Project (SOGI), which was formed in 2009 to "enhance the clinical skills of graduate students working with lesbian, gay, bisexual, transgender, queer individuals (LGBTQ) clients and their families, as well as develop educational and campus-wide access for students across disciplines who are interested in LGBTQ studies." Lev was key in the formation of this program as part of her work as an independent scholar, which was honored by the university in May 2011. Lev was also honored in 2014 with the President's Award for Exemplary Community Engagement.

In 2010, Lev founded TIGRIS: The Institute for Gender, Relationships, Identity, and Sexuality, a post-graduate training program in Albany, New York. She serves as training director.

Lev is the clinical supervisor for the Pride Center of the Capital Region's internship program through the University of Albany's School of Social Welfare Social Work Program.

Lev is on the board of directors of the American Family Therapy Academy, and serves on the editorial boards of The Journal of GLBT Family Studies, and The International Journal of Transgender Health. She is also a member of the World Professional Association for Transgender Health, and worked on developing the 7th edition of the Standards of Care.

== Personal life ==
Lev is an out lesbian.

== Awards ==
- University at Albany, President's Award for Exemplary Community Engagement, 2014
- Innovative Contribution to Family Therapy,, American Family Therapy Academy, 2013
- Ally Award, Freedom Center for Social Justice, TransFaith in Color Conference, 2011
- Unsung Hero Award from the University at Albany, Lavender Graduation, 2010
- Community Service Award, Capital District Gay and Lesbian Community Council, 2010
- Transgender Emergence won the American Psychological Association, Division 44, as Distinguished Book of the Year, 2006
- Transgender Emergence chosen by the Society of Sex Therapy and Research as Book of Special Merit, 2006
- "Positive Difference Award", the Office of Learning Disabled Students Services Department of Student Life, University at Albany, 2003

== Selected publications ==
=== Books ===
- Lev, Arlene Istar (2004). Transgender Emergence: Therapeutic Guidelines for Working with Gender-variant People and Their Families. Haworth Clinical Practice Press. ISBN 978-0-7890-2117-5.
- Lev, Arlene Istar (2004). The Complete Lesbian & Gay Parenting Guide. Berkley Books. ISBN 978-0-425-19197-2.

=== Book chapters ===
- Lev, A.I. (in press). Understanding Transgender Identities and Exploring Sexuality and Desire. In Allex, G.H. (Ed). "Sexual Diversity and Sexual Offending. Research, Assessment and Clinical Treatment in Psychosexual Therapy. London: Kamac.
- Lev, A.I. (in press). Resilience in Lesbian and Gay Couples. In K. Skerrett, K. & K. Fergus (Eds). 2014. Couple resilience across the lifespan: Emerging perspectives. New York: Springer Press.
- Lev, A.I., & Sennott, S. (2013). Clinical Work with LGBT Parents and Prospective Parents. In A. Goldberg & K. R. Allen (Eds) LGBT-Parent Families: Possibilities for New Research and Implications for Practice. New York: Springer Press.
- Lev, A.I. & Sennott, S. (2012). Trans-sexual Desire in Different Gendered Bodies. In J.J. Bigner & J.L. Wetchler (Eds.), Handbook of LGBT-Affirmative Couple and Family Therapy. NY: Taylor & Francis.
- Lev, A.I., & Sennott, S. (2012). Understanding Gender Nonconformity and Transgender Identity: A Sex Positive Approach, In P. Kleinplatt's (Ed.) New Directions in Sex Therapy (2nd Edition), NY: Routledge Press.
- Kleinplatz, P.J., Moser, C., & Lev, A.I (in press). Sex and Gender Identity Disorders. In G. Stricker & Tom Widiger, (Eds.), Clinical Psychology (Vol. 8) Handbook of Psychology (2nd Edition). Hoboken, NJ: Wiley & Sons.
- Lev, A.I (2007). Understanding Sexual Orientation and Gender Identity: The need for education in servicing victims of trauma. In Encyclopedia of Domestic Violence, (Ed.) Nicky Ali Jackson, Ph.D. NY: Routledge.
- Lev, A.I. (2006). Transgender Communities: Developing Identity through Connection In Bieschke, K., Perez, R. & DeBord, K. (Eds.). Handbook of Counseling and Psychotherapy with Lesbian, Gay, and Bisexual Clients (2nd Ed). American Psychological Association, Washington, D.C., 147–175.
- Lev, A.I. (2006). Transgender Emergence within Families. Sexual orientation and gender identity in social work practice. Morrow, D.F, & Messinger, L. (Eds.) NY: Columbia University Press, 263–283.
- Lev, A. Lev, S. (1999). Sexual Assault in the Lesbian, Gay, Bisexual and Transgendered Communities in. Joan C. McClennen & J. Gunther (Eds.) A Professional Guide to Understanding Gay and Lesbian Domestic Violence: Understanding Practice Interventions. Lewiston NY: Edwin Mellen Press, 35–62.
- Lev, Arlene I. (1996), "Couple assessment: identifying and intervening in domestic violence in lesbian relationships", in Renzetti, Claire M.; Miley, Charles Harvey (eds.), Violence in gay and lesbian domestic partnerships, New York: Harrington Park Press, pp. 93–106, ISBN 9781560230748. [Monograph also published in journal format.]

=== Journal articles ===
- Lev, Arlene Istar (2013). "Gender Dysphoria: Two Steps Forward, One Step Back". Clinical Social Work Journal. 41 (3): 288–296. doi:10.1007/s10615-013-0447-0. S2CID 144556484.
- Coleman, E., Bockting, W., Botzer, M., CohenKettenis, P., DeCuypere, G., Feldman, J., Fraser, L., Green, J., Knudson, G., Meyer, W., Monstrey, S., Adler, R., Brown, G., Devor, A., Ehrbar, R., Ettner, R., Eyler, E., Garofalo, R., Karasic, D., Lev, A.I ., Mayer, G., MeyerBahlburg, H., Hall, B. P., Pfaefflin, F., Rachlin, K., Robinson, B., Schechter, L., Tangpricha, V., van Trotsenburg, M., Vitale, A., Winter, S., Whittle, S., Wylie, K., & Zucker, K. (2011). Standards of Care for the health of transsexual, transgender, and gender nonconforming people, 7th Version, International Journal of Transgender Health. http://wpath.org.
- Tasker, F.; Buxton, A.P.; Fedewa, A.; Goldberg, A.; Gottlieb, A.; Green, R-J.; LaSala, M.; Lev, A.I; Lynch, J.; Tunnell, G.; Wetchler, J.L. (2011). "Jerry J. Bigner: A Tribute to the Founding Editor of the Journal of GLBT Family Studies". Journal of GLBT Family Studies. 7 (5): 419–422. doi:10.1080/1550428X.2011.623926. S2CID 216112149.
- Rachlin, K.; Lev, A.I. (2011). "Challenging Cases for Experienced Therapists". Journal of Gay & Lesbian Mental Health. 15 (2): 1–20. doi:10.1080/19359705.2011.553783. S2CID 145016607.
- Lev, A., Winters, K., Alie, L., Ansara, Y., Deutsch, M., Dickey, L., Ehrbar, R., Ehrensaft, D., Green, J., Meier, S., Richmond, K., Samons, S., Susset, F., (2010). “Response to Proposed DSM-5 Diagnostic Criteria,” Professionals Concerned with Gender Diagnoses in the DSM'Italic text, https://web.archive.org/web/20160422030121/http://professionals.gidreform.org/.
- Lev, A.I. (2010). "How queer - The development of gender identity and sexual orientation in LGBTQ-headed families". Family Process. 49 (2): 268–290. doi:10.1111/j.1545-5300.2010.01323.x. PMID 20831761. S2CID 143771065.
- Lev, A.I. (2010). ""A review of "Gay and lesbian parents and their children: Research on the family life cycle; Who's your daddy? And other writings on queer parenting; Becoming parent: Lesbians, gay men, and family". Journal of GLBT Family Studies. 6 (3): 341–348. doi:10.1080/1550428X.2010.490903. S2CID 216117936.
- Lev, A.I. (2009). "The ten tasks of the mental health provider: Recommendations for revision of the World Professional Association for Transgender Health's Standards of Care". International Journal of Transgenderism. 11 (2): 74–99. doi:10.1080/15532730903008032. S2CID 144111188.
- Lev, A.I. (2008). "More than surface tension: Femmes in families". Journal of Lesbian Studies. 12 (2–3): 2–3. doi:10.1080/10894160802161299. PMID 19042728. S2CID 9394693.
- Lev, A.I. (2006). "Intersexuality in the family: An unacknowledged trauma". The Journal of Gay and Lesbian Psychotherapy. 10 (2): 27–56. doi:10.1300/J236v10n02_03. S2CID 71890610.
- Lev, A.I. (2006). "Gay Dads: Choosing surrogacy". The British Psychological Society Lesbian and Gay Psychology Review. 7 (1): 72–76.
- Lev, Arlene Istar (2006). "Disordering Gender Identity: Gender Identity Disorder in the DSM-IV-TR". Journal of Psychology & Human Sexuality. 17 (3–4): 35–69. doi:10.1300/J056v17n03_03. S2CID 216147670.
- Lev, Arlene Istar (2006). "Intersexuality in the Family: An Unacknowledged Trauma". Journal of Gay & Lesbian Psychotherapy. 10 (2): 27–56. doi:10.1300/J236v10n02_03. S2CID 71890610.
- Lev, Arlene Istar (2008). "More than Surface Tension: Femmes in Families". Journal of Lesbian Studies. 12 (2–3): 127–144. doi:10.1080/10894160802161299. PMID 19042728. S2CID 9394693.
- Lev, Arlene Istar (2010). "How Queer!—The Development of Gender Identity and Sexual Orientation in LGBTQ-Headed Families". Family Process. 49 (3): 268–290. doi:10.1111/j.1545-5300.2010.01323.x. PMID 20831761. S2CID 143771065.
- Lev, A., Winters, K., Alie, L., Ansara, Y., Deutsch, M., Dickey, L., Ehrbar, R., Ehrensaft, D., Green, J., Meier, S., Richmond, K., Samons, S., Susset, F., (2010). “Response to Proposed DSM-5 Diagnostic Criteria,” Professionals Concerned With Gender Diagnoses in the DSM,.[16]
- Rachlin, Katherine; Istar Lev, Arlene (2013). "Challenging Cases for Experienced Therapists". Journal of Gay & Lesbian Mental Health. 15 (2): 180–199. doi:10.1080/19359705.2011.553783. S2CID 145016607.
