= Maltzman =

Maltzman is an Ashkenazi Jewish occupational surname asociated with the production of malt, produced from the surname Maltz with the suffix '-man'. Notable people with the surname include:

- Daniel Maltzman (born 1963), American artist
- Max Maltzman, American architect
