= Sophia the Ocean =

Sophia The Ocean
- Origin: Viña del Mar, Chile
- Genres: Alternative rock, indie rock, power pop, pop punk, R&B, electronic music, post-hardcore (early)
- Years active: 2005 – present
- Label: La Somba Records
- Members: Juan Pablo Osses; Sebastian Osses; Sergio Alvarez; Luis A. Boza; Francisco Tapia
- Website: www.sophiatheocean.com

Sophia The Ocean is an alternative rock band from Viña del Mar, Chile formed in 2007. The band music mixture alternative rock, pop punk, experimental rock, indie rock, electronic music, power pop, soul, blues and R&B, also post-hardcore and emo in the first EP. The songs of the band contain English and Spanish, sometimes both in one song, this is because the brothers Osses lived some years on Hallandale, Florida.

The name of the band means "wisdom of the ocean", the female name "Sophia", means "wisdom", according by words of Juan Pablo Osses.

The band influences are variety, New Kids On The Block, Justin Timberlake, Ne-Yo, Sugar Ray, Nsync, Lagwagon, Pennywise, NOFX, Sublime, Every Avenue, The Audition, The Killers, Kings of Leon, Maroon 5, Bee Gees, Lit, Simple Plan, Panic! at the Disco, Comeback Kid, Anberlin, Emery, among many others.

== History ==
The band was formed by the brothers Juan Pablo (vocals & guitar) and Sebastian Osses (vocals, bass & programming), Luis A. Boza (guitar) and Sergio Alvarez (drums). The rhythm guitarist, Francisco Tapia was joined the band on early 2010.

Sophia independently released Cities are like Black Holes EP in the Summer of 2008. In April 2008, the band appeared on MTV Latin America on the TV show "LA ZONA", ranking first place of the rest of the bands from Chile.

Sophia The Ocean has gone on three national tours so far. In 2008, they went on the "Let The Critics Talk...Tour" and in the winter of the same year they toured the country again with Rosewell on "The Dance Party Winter Tour". On other tours, Sophia participated with bands as Admira mi Desastre (from Chile), Have Heart (from USA), Boom Boom Kid and Eterna Inocencia (both from Argentina).

They were signed to "La Somba Records" in 2009. And released their second EP We Own The Night, at beginning of 2010.

The band has recently gone on their first international tour ("Trading Mercenaries From The Black Rock Tour 2010"), traveling around Chile, Peru and Ecuador.

They are also preparing an album to release later in 2012.

== Members ==
- Juan Pablo Ossès — lead vocals, rhythm guitar, harmonica
- Sebastian Ossès — vocals, bass, programming, samples, additional guitars
- Francisco Tapia — screamed vocals, rhythm guitar, backing vocals
- Sergio Alvarez — drums, percussion
- Luis A. Boza — lead guitar, backing vocals

== Discography ==
- Cities Are Like Black Holes (EP, self-released, 2008)
- Homeless Hype on a Bacherlor's Night (Single, with Made To Be Broken, 2008)
- We Own The Night (EP, La Somba Records, 2009)

== Videography ==
- "High On The Delivery" (2011, Directed by Fernando Galván)
