= Maltz =

Maltz (from German: Malz - malt) is a German and Jewish surname. It may be an occupational surname associated with the production of malt. Variant: Malz. Notable people with the surname include:

- Albert Maltz (1908–1985), American writer
- Benjamin N. Maltz (1901–1993), American banker and philanthropist
- Carlos Maltz (born 1962), Brazilian drummer
- Dylan Maltz (born 1994), American lacrosse player
- George L. Maltz (1842–1910), American banker and politician
- Maxwell Maltz (1899–1975), American plastic surgeon and author
- Michael Maltz (born 1938), American criminologist and electrical engineer
- Peter Jacob Maltz (born 1973), Israeli artist
- Wendy Maltz (born 1950), American sex therapist

== See also ==
- Maltz, a Klingon in Star Trek III; see List of Star Trek characters: G-M#M
- Maltzman
