= Roger Mayweather =

American boxer (1961–2020)

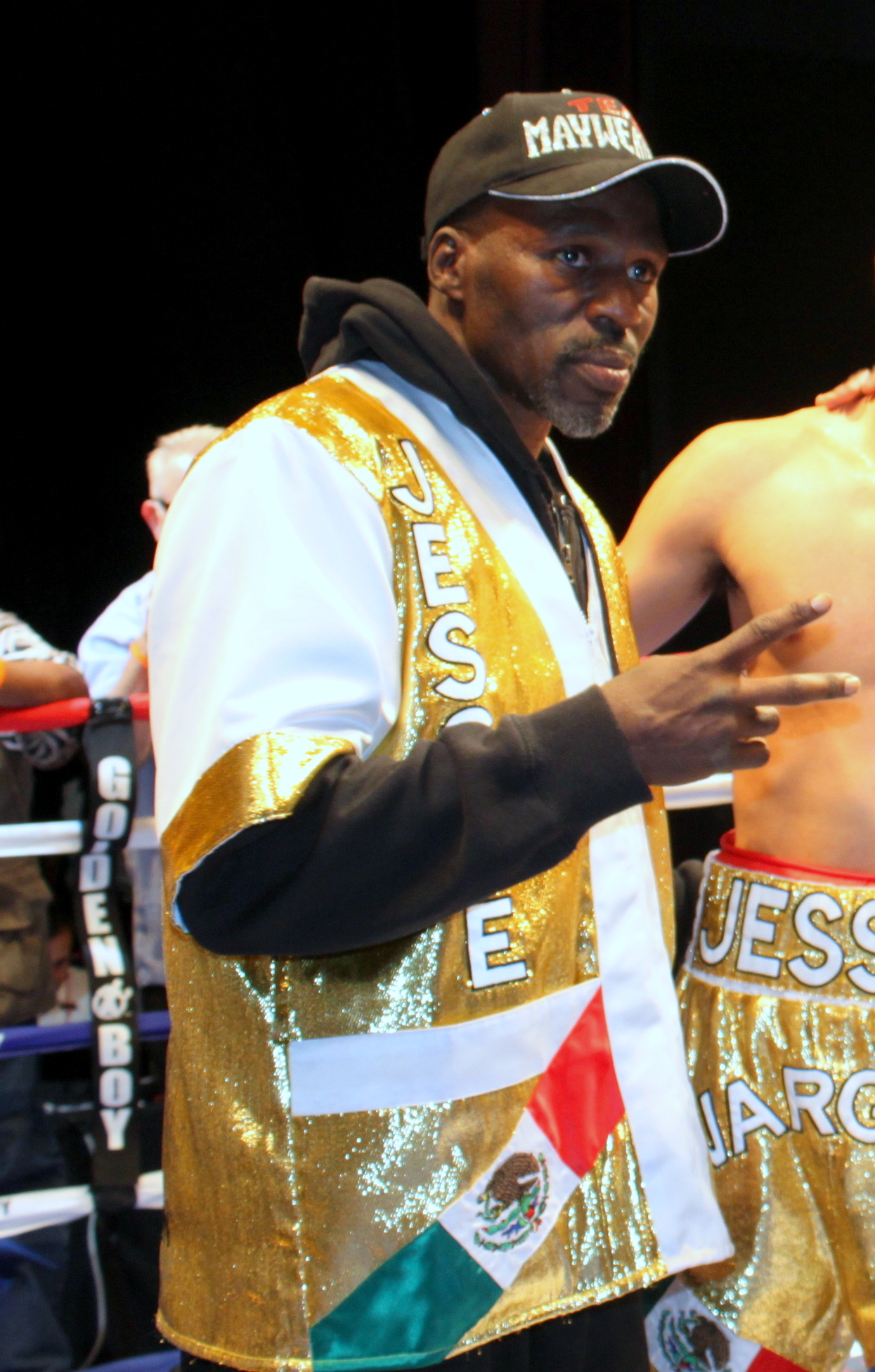
- Mayweather in 2010

Personal information
- Nickname: Black Mamba
- Born: Roger L. Mayweather; April 24, 1961 Grand Rapids, Michigan, U.S.
- Died: March 17, 2020 (aged 58) Las Vegas, Nevada, U.S.
- Height: 5 ft 7 1/2 in (171 cm)
- Weight: Super featherweight; Lightweight; Light welterweight; Welterweight

Boxing career
- Reach: 73 1/2 in (187 cm)
- Stance: Orthodox

Boxing record
- Total fights: 72
- Wins: 59
- Win by KO: 35
- Losses: 13

Roger L. Mayweather (April 24, 1961 – March 17, 2020) was an American professional boxer who competed from 1981 to 1999 and later on a boxing trainer. He was a two-division world champion, having held the World Boxing Association (WBA) and Ring magazine super featherweight titles from 1983 to 1984, and the World Boxing Council (WBC) light welterweight title from 1987 to 1989. Additionally he held the IBO light welterweight title in 1994, and the IBO welterweight title from 1994 to 1995.

Mayweather served as the trainer for his nephew, Floyd Mayweather Jr., from 2000 to 2012. He emphasized the Michigan Defense and use of a defensive technique known as the shoulder roll. Under Roger's guidance, Floyd Jr. became one of the biggest names in the sport of boxing and one of the pound for pound greats.

== Professional boxing career ==
=== Super featherweight and lightweight ===
Mayweather, who was 64–4 as an amateur, made his professional debut on July 29, 1981, against Andrew Ruiz. Mayweather won by technical knockout (TKO) in the first round. In his thirteenth fight, Mayweather beat Ruben Muñoz Jr. for the IBF-USBA lightweight title.

After improving his record to 14–0, Mayweather earned a title shot on January 19, 1983, against lineal and WBA super featherweight champion, Samuel Serrano. Serrano entered the bout with a record of 47–5–1 and had lost only once since first winning the title in 1976. Nonetheless, Mayweather led on all three judges' scorecards before he beat Serrano by TKO in round eight and effectively ended Serrano's career.

Mayweather made two successful title defenses against Jorge Alvarado and Benedicto Villablanca before suffering his first loss via first-round knockout against Rocky Lockridge on February 22, 1984.

Mayweather won the IBF-USBA super featherweight title when he gave Kenny Baysmore his first loss, by TKO in round three. Thus, Mayweather earned the opportunity to fight against WBC super featherweight champion, Julio César Chávez, on July 7, 1985. Although Mayweather won the first round on the judges' scorecards, he was knocked down twice in round two and lost by TKO.

On November 28, 1986, Mayweather beat Sammy Fuentes for the WBC Continental Americas lightweight title. In his next bout, on March 28, 1987, Mayweather fought against Pernell Whitaker for the WBC-NABF lightweight title. Mayweather was knocked down in round one, but he knocked down Whitaker in round nine. Whitaker won by unanimous decision (UD).

=== Light welterweight ===
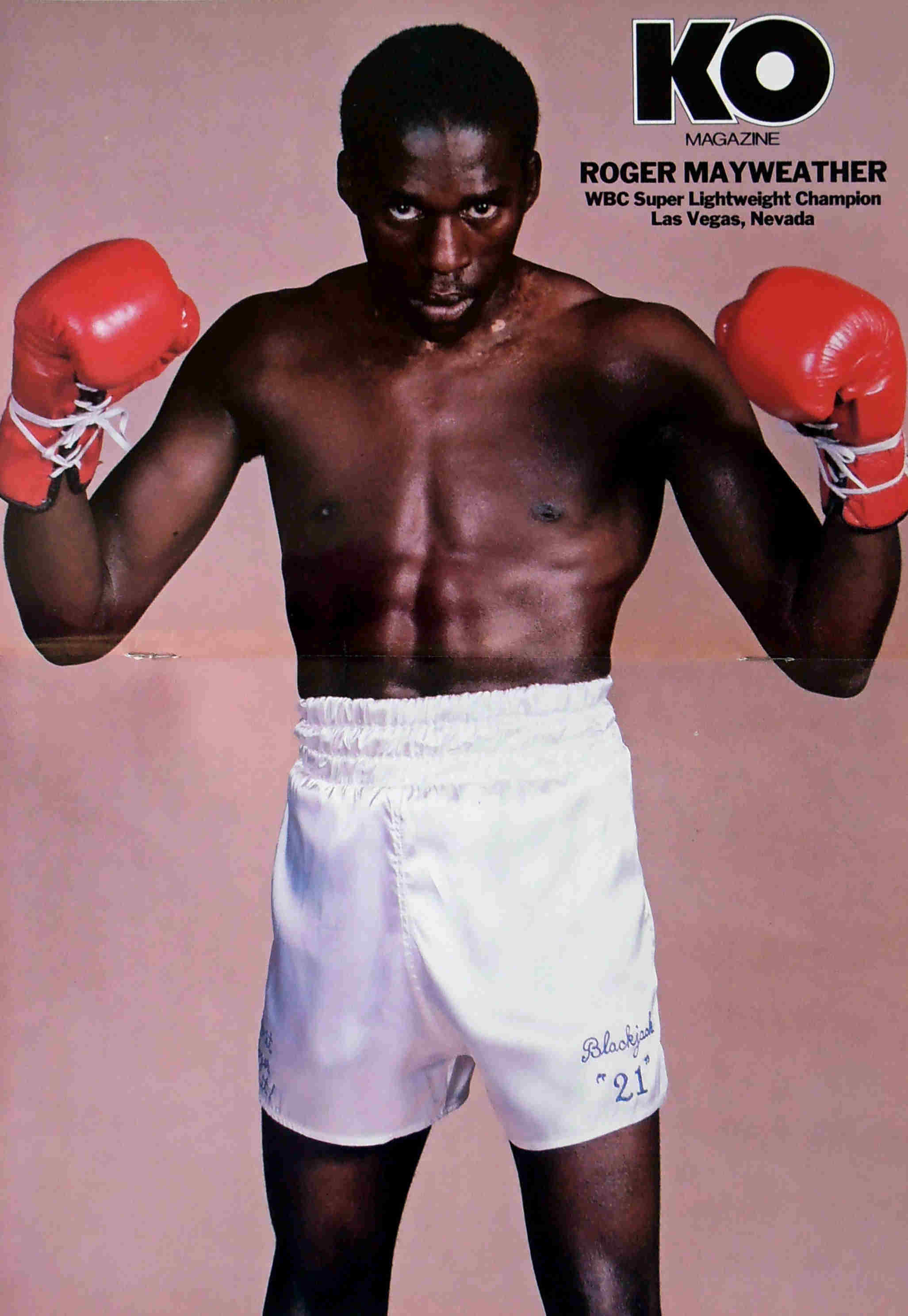
Mayweather c. 1988

After Mayweather moved up to the light welterweight division, he fought against WBC light welterweight champion, Rene Arredondo, on November 12, 1987. Mayweather led on the scorecards and knocked down Arredondo three times in round six to win by TKO.

Mayweather made four successful title defenses before he encountered Mexican champion Julio César Chávez again on May 13, 1989. Prior to this fight, Mayweather was being called by several boxing writers as "The Mexican assassin" due to his numerous wins over Mexican fighters during the last few years. Chávez was still undefeated at the time, and with a 63–0 record, he was becoming a legend. Mayweather retired after round ten due to the body damage inflicted by Chávez.

Mayweather won the WBA Americas light welterweight title on April 5, 1990, from Ildemar Paisan. He fought Rafael Pineda for the vacant IBF light welterweight title on December 7, 1991, but he lost by KO in round nine.

On March 14, 1993, Mayweather beat former WBA lightweight champion, Livingstone Bramble by corner stoppage in round five. Bramble had defeated Ray 'Boom Boom' Mancini twice for the title in the mid-1980s.

Mayweather defeated Eduardo Montes for the IBO light welterweight title by third-round KO on May 28, 1994. Less than three weeks later, he defeated Marco Antonio Ramirez by TKO in round three.

=== Welterweight ===
In his next fight, against Johnny Bizzarro on August 4, 1994, Mayweather won the IBO welterweight title by unanimous decision. He defended the belt once in 1995.

On June 25, 1995, Mayweather fought the 14–0 Kostya Tszyu for the IBF light welterweight title. Tszyu won by unanimous decision.

Mayweather won his last title—the IBA welterweight title—on March 12, 1997, when he beat Carlos Miranda via twelfth-round TKO. Mayweather's final bout was a majority decision victory over Javier Francisco Mendez on May 8, 1999. He ended his career with a total of nine major and minor titles in four weight classes.

== Black Mamba ==
When asked about his ring nickname, Roger stated:

"It's funny because I wanted a boxing nickname that wouldn’t be common to most people. One day when I was flipping through channels and I came upon this channel showing different reptiles, and they were showing the black mamba, one of the most deadly snakes in the world. I loved the way the mamba attacked so quietly, but when he hit you he just hit you one time and the venom was in you. That reminded me of myself right there."

== Training career ==
When Floyd Mayweather Jr. turned pro in 1996, Roger Mayweather turned his attention away from his own competitive boxing career and focused more on being the younger Mayweather's trainer. Roger trained Floyd Jr. until early 1998, when Floyd Mayweather Sr. was released from prison and became Mayweather Jr's trainer. However, soon after Mayweather defeated Gregorio Vargas on March 18, 2000, Mayweather Jr. fired Mayweather Sr. as his trainer and brought uncle Roger back.

Roger Mayweather garnered national attention during and after Floyd Mayweather Jr. vs. Zab Judah on April 8, 2006. Near the conclusion of the tenth round, Judah hit Mayweather with a left hand that was clearly below the belt and followed up with a right-handed rabbit punch. After referee Richard Steele called time with five seconds remaining in the round, Roger Mayweather entered the ring, but was restrained by Steele. Judah's father and trainer, Yoel Judah, entered the ring and swung at Roger. Zab then went after Roger—taking a swing and grappling with him until security broke it up and cleared the ring. Roger was ejected, but the boxers finished the remaining two rounds, and Mayweather won by unanimous decision. Five days after the fight, the Nevada State Athletic Commission decided not to overturn the result of the bout, but Roger Mayweather was fined US $200,000 and suspended for one year.

== Controversy ==
Mayweather was arrested in August 2009 in Las Vegas for allegedly attacking one of his former boxers, female boxer Melissa St. Vil. Mayweather allegedly hit her several times in the ribs, then tried to choke her, causing her to spit up blood when police arrived. Appearing on the HBO series 24/7, Mayweather admitted to choking St. Vil in an effort to restrain her, but denied that he physically struck her.

== Personal life ==
Mayweather was born in Grand Rapids, Michigan, the son of Bernice (Ambrose) and Theartha Mayweather. He is a part of the Mayweather boxing family: his brothers are Floyd Mayweather Sr. and Jeff Mayweather, and his nephew is Floyd Mayweather Jr.

== Death ==
Mayweather died on March 17, 2020, in Las Vegas, Nevada at age 58, after years of deteriorating health. Floyd opened up about Roger's health back in 2015, and thinks that boxing is the main cause of it.

He did not specify the cause, but said his uncle's “health was failing him for several years.” Roger Mayweather had a number of long-term health problems, including diabetes.

"My uncle Roger Mayweather has lost a lot of memory from the sport of boxing, he's only in his 50s, but it seems like he's an old man in his 80s." Floyd said.

== Professional boxing record ==
72 fights	59 wins	13 losses
By knockout	35	6
By decision	23	7
By disqualification	1	0

No.	Result	Record	Opponent	Type	Round, time	Date	Location	Notes
72	Win	59–13	Javier Francisco Méndez	MD	10	May 8, 1999	Club Cal Neva, Reno, Nevada, U.S.	
71	Win	58–13	Patrick Byrd	UD	10	Nov 13, 1998	Jackpot Junction Casino Hotel, Morton, Minnesota, U.S.	
70	Win	57–13	Carlos Miranda	TKO	12 (12), 2:51	Mar 12, 1997	Stadium Arena, Grand Rapids, Michigan, U.S.	Won vacant IBA welterweight title
69	Loss	56–13	Juan Soberanes	SD	10	Sep 21, 1996	Harrah's Laughlin, Nevada, U.S.	
68	Win	56–12	Tom McCain	TKO	5 (10), 1:45	Aug 3, 1996	Erlanger, Kentucky, U.S.	
67	Win	55–12	Clifford Hicks	TKO	3 (10)	Oct 21, 1995	Miami Beach, Florida, U.S.	
66	Loss	54–12	Kostya Tszyu	UD	12	Jun 25, 1995	Entertainment Centre, Newcastle, Australia	For IBF light welterweight title
65	Win	54–11	Mike Mungin	MD	10	Apr 30, 1995	Rio All Suite Hotel and Casino, Paradise, Nevada, U.S.	
64	Win	53–11	Aaron McLaurine	TKO	9 (12), 2:44	Feb 17, 1995	Silver Nugget, North Las Vegas, Nevada, U.S.	Retained IBO welterweight title
63	Win	52–11	Francisco Barra	TKO	3 (8), 1:45	Dec 29, 1994	Silver Nugget, North Las Vegas, Nevada, U.S.	
62	Loss	51–11	Ray Lovato	KO	2 (10), 0:39	Sep 16, 1994	The Aladdin, Paradise, Nevada, U.S.	
61	Win	51–10	Johnny Bizzarro	UD	12	Aug 8, 1994	Foxwoods Resort Casino, Ledyard, Connecticut, U.S.	Won IBO welterweight title
60	Win	50–10	Marco Antonio Ramirez	TKO	3 (10), 1:35	Jun 16, 1994	Silver Nugget, North Las Vegas, Nevada, U.S.	
59	Win	49–10	Eduardo Montes	KO	3 (12)	May 28, 1994	St. George, Utah, U.S.	Won vacant IBO light welterweight title
58	Win	48–10	Miguel González	UD	10	Apr 8, 1994	Flamingo Hilton, Laughlin, Nevada, U.S.	
57	Win	47–10	Nino Cirilo	TKO	3 (10), 2:18	Mar 17, 1994	Silver Nugget, North Las Vegas, Nevada, U.S.	
56	Win	46–10	Rod Sequenan	UD	10	Feb 9, 1994	Silver Nugget, North Las Vegas, Nevada, U.S.	
55	Win	45–10	Bruno Rabanales	PTS	10	Dec 18, 1993	Cancún, Mexico	
54	Loss	44–10	Darryl Tyson	SD	12	Oct 27, 1993	Bally's Park Place, Atlantic City, New Jersey, U.S.	For vacant USBA light welterweight title
53	Win	44–9	Carl Griffith	UD	10	Jul 1, 1993	The Aladdin, Paradise, Nevada, U.S.	
52	Loss	43–9	Zack Padilla	SD	10	Apr 24, 1993	The Aladdin, Paradise, Nevada, U.S.	
51	Win	43–8	Livingstone Bramble	DQ	5 (10), 1:10	Mar 14, 1993	The Aladdin, Paradise, Nevada, U.S.	Bramble disqualified after corner entered the ring too early
50	Win	42–8	Gilberto Flores	TKO	3 (10)	Dec 9, 1992	Hollywood Palladium, Los Angeles, California, U.S.	
49	Loss	41–8	Fidel Avendano	UD	10	Sep 28, 1992	Great Western Forum, Inglewood, California, U.S.	
48	Win	41–7	Pedro De La Cruz	TKO	2 (10), 2:32	Aug 10, 1992	Great Western Forum, Inglewood, California, U.S.	
47	Loss	40–7	Rafael Pineda	KO	9 (12), 2:00	Dec 7, 1991	Convention Center, Reno, Nevada, U.S.	For vacant IBF light welterweight title
46	Win	40–6	Alberto Alcaraz	SD	10	May 11, 1991	Memorial Coliseum, Portland, Oregon, U.S.	
45	Win	39–6	Santos Moreno	TKO	3 (10), 1:47	Dec 27, 1990	Hacienda, Paradise, Nevada, U.S.	
44	Win	38–6	Mike Johnson	UD	10	Oct 11, 1990	Bally's Las Vegas, Paradise, Nevada, U.S.	
43	Win	37–6	Terrence Alli	UD	10	Jul 15, 1990	TropWorld Casino and Entertainment Resort, Atlantic City, New Jersey, U.S.	
42	Win	36–6	Ildemar Jose Paisan	UD	12	Apr 5, 1990	Bally's Las Vegas, Paradise, Nevada, U.S.	Won vacant WBA Americas light welterweight title
41	Win	35–6	Jose Rivera	KO	5 (10), 1:51	Feb 2, 1990	Bally's Las Vegas, Paradise, Nevada, U.S.	
40	Loss	34–6	Julio César Chávez	RTD	10 (12), 3:00	May 13, 1989	Great Western Forum, Inglewood, California, U.S.	Lost WBC light welterweight title
39	Win	34–5	Vinny Pazienza	UD	12	Nov 7, 1988	Caesars Palace, Paradise, Nevada, U.S.	Retained WBC light welterweight title
38	Win	33–5	Rodolfo González	TKO	12 (12), 2:13	Sep 22, 1988	Memorial Sports Arena, Los Angeles, California, U.S.	Retained WBC light welterweight title
37	Win	32–5	Harold Brazier	SD	12	Jun 6, 1988	Las Vegas Hilton, Winchester, Nevada, U.S.	Retained WBC light welterweight title
36	Win	31–5	Mauricio Aceves	TKO	3 (12), 1:32	Mar 24, 1988	Memorial Sports Arena, Los Angeles, California, U.S.	Retained WBC light welterweight title
35	Win	30–5	Marvin Garris	TKO	7 (10), 2:58	Jan 5, 1988	Showboat Hotel and Casino, Las Vegas, Nevada, U.S.	
34	Win	29–5	René Arredondo	TKO	6 (12), 2:00	Nov 12, 1987	Memorial Sports Arena, Los Angeles, California, U.S.	Won WBC light welterweight title
33	Win	28–5	Mitchell Julien	TKO	3 (10), 3:59	Jul 14, 1987	Bally's Las Vegas, Paradise, Nevada, U.S.	
32	Win	27–5	Frankie Davis	TKO	4 (10), 0:59	May 14, 1987	Showboat Hotel and Casino, Las Vegas, Nevada, U.S.	
31	Loss	26–5	Pernell Whitaker	UD	12	Mar 28, 1987	Scope, Norfolk, Virginia, U.S.	For vacant NABF lightweight title
30	Win	26–4	Sammy Fuentes	RTD	9 (12), 3:00	Nov 28, 1986	Trump Plaza Hotel and Casino, Atlantic City, New Jersey, U.S.	Won vacant WBC Continental Americas lightweight title
29	Win	25–4	Sergio Zambrano	RTD	6 (10), 3:00	Aug 7, 1986	Grand Olympic Auditorium, Los Angeles, California, U.S.	
28	Win	24–4	Oscar Bejines	RTD	7 (10), 3:00	Jul 3, 1986	Grand Olympic Auditorium, Los Angeles, California, U.S.	
27	Loss	23–4	Freddie Pendleton	KO	6 (10), 0:54	Mar 12, 1986	Sahara Hotel and Casino, Winchester, Nevada, U.S.	
26	Win	23–3	Walter Sims	UD	10	Jan 15, 1986	Sahara Hotel and Casino, Winchester, Nevada, U.S.	
25	Win	22–3	Mario Martinez	SD	10	Nov 7, 1985	Grand Olympic Auditorium, Los Angeles, California, U.S.	
24	Loss	21–3	Julio César Chávez	TKO	2 (12), 2:30	Jul 7, 1985	Riviera, Winchester, Nevada, U.S.	For WBC super featherweight title
23	Win	21–2	Kenny Baysmore	TKO	3 (12), 1:28	May 12, 1985	The Oil Palace, Tyler, Texas, U.S.	Won USBA super featherweight title
22	Win	20–2	Billy White	TKO	5 (10), 2:18	Feb 28, 1985	Showboat Hotel and Casino, Las Vegas, Nevada, U.S.	
21	Win	19–2	Martin Quiroz	TKO	3 (10), 0:21	Nov 21, 1984	Riviera, Winchester, Nevada, U.S.	
20	Win	18–2	Efrain Nieves	UD	10	Sep 22, 1984	Gerald R. Ford Fieldhouse, Grand Rapids, Michigan, U.S.	
19	Loss	17–2	Tony Baltazar	UD	10	Jul 8, 1984	Country Club, Reseda, California, U.S.	
18	Loss	17–1	Rocky Lockridge	KO	1 (15), 1:31	Feb 26, 1984	Civic Center, Beaumont, Texas, U.S.	Lost WBA and The Ring super featherweight titles
17	Win	17–0	Benedicto Villablanca	KO	1 (15), 3:04	Aug 17, 1983	Showboat Hotel and Casino, Las Vegas, Nevada, U.S.	Retained WBA and The Ring super featherweight titles
16	Win	16–0	Jorge Alvarado	TKO	8 (15)	Apr 20, 1983	Civic Auditorium, San Jose, California, U.S.	Retained WBA and The Ring super featherweight titles
15	Win	15–0	Samuel Serrano	TKO	8 (15), 2:13	Jan 19, 1983	Hiram Bithorn Stadium, San Juan, Puerto Rico	Won WBA and The Ring super featherweight titles
14	Win	14–0	Elmer Suttington	TKO	2 (10), 1:01	Nov 17, 1982	Civic Arena, St. Joseph, Missouri, U.S.	
13	Win	13–0	Ruben Munoz Jr.	UD	12	Oct 23, 1982	Convention Hall, Atlantic City, New Jersey, U.S.	Won USBA lightweight title
12	Win	12–0	Frankie Moultrie	TKO	9 (10), 0:53	Sep 30, 1982	Dunes, Paradise, Nevada, U.S.	
11	Win	11–0	Arturo Leon	UD	10	Aug 18, 1982	Dunes, Paradise, Nevada, U.S.	
10	Win	10–0	Carlton Sparrow	TKO	4 (12), 2:43	Jul 29, 1982	Las Vegas, Nevada, U.S.	
9	Win	9–0	Kelvin Lampkin	UD	10	May 26, 1982	Showboat Hotel and Casino, Las Vegas, Nevada, U.S.	
8	Win	8–0	Jimmy Blevins	PTS	10	Apr 3, 1982	The Aladdin, Paradise, Nevada, U.S.	
7	Win	7–0	Roberto Garcia	TKO	3 (8)	Jan 28, 1982	Showboat Hotel and Casino, Las Vegas, Nevada, U.S.	
6	Win	6–0	Adriano Arreola	TKO	6 (8)	Nov 14, 1981	Showboat Hotel and Casino, Las Vegas, Nevada, U.S.	
5	Win	5–0	Vinnie Hines	TKO	2 (6), 1:56	Nov 7, 1981	Hacienda, Paradise, Nevada, U.S.	
4	Win	4–0	Juan Manuel Hernandez	UD	6	Oct 21, 1981	Silver Slipper, Paradise, Nevada, U.S.	
3	Win	3–0	Javier Benitez	KO	5 (6)	Sep 24, 1981	Hacienda, Paradise, Nevada, U.S.	
2	Win	2–0	Jaime Nava	PTS	8	Aug 5, 1981	Silver Slipper, Paradise, Nevada, U.S.	
1	Win	1–0	Andrew Ruiz	TKO	1 (4)	Jul 29, 1981	Silver Slipper, Paradise, Nevada, U.S.	

== Titles in boxing ==
=== Major world titles ===
- WBA super featherweight champion (130 lbs)
- WBC light welterweight champion (140 lbs)

=== The Ring magazine titles ===
- The Ring super featherweight champion (130 lbs)

=== Minor world titles ===
- IBO light welterweight champion (140 lbs)
- IBO welterweight champion (147 lbs)
- IBA welterweight champion (147 lbs)

=== Regional/International titles ===
- USBA super featherweight champion (130 lbs)
- USBA lightweight champion (135 lbs)
- WBC Continental Americas lightweight champion (135 lbs)
- WBA Americas light welterweight champion (140 lbs)

== See also ==
- List of world super-featherweight boxing champions
- List of world light-welterweight boxing champions
- List of boxing families

Sporting positions
Regional boxing titles
Preceded by Ruben Munoz Jr.	USBA lightweight champion October 23, 1982 – January 1983; Vacated	Vacant Title next held by Jimmy Paul
Preceded by Kenny Baysmore	USBA super featherweight champion May 12, 1985 – July 1985; Vacated	Vacant Title next held by Kenny Baysmore
Vacant Title last held by Darryl Tyson	WBC Continental Americas lightweight champion November 28, 1986 – March 1987; Vacated	Vacant Title next held by John Duplessis
Minor world boxing titles
Vacant Title last held by Mike Johnson	IBO light welterweight champion May 28, 1994 – August 1994; Vacated	Vacant Title next held by Lester Ellis
Preceded by Johnny Bizzarro	IBO welterweight champion August 4, 1994 – June 1995; Vacated	Vacant Title next held by Kip Diggs
New title	IBA welterweight champion March 12, 1997 – November 1998; Vacated	Vacant Title next held by Oscar De La Hoya
Major world boxing titles
Preceded by Samuel Serrano	WBA super featherweight champion January 19, 1983 – February 26, 1984	Succeeded by Rocky Lockridge
Preceded by Samuel Serrano	The Ring super featherweight champion January 19, 1983 – February 26, 1984	Succeeded by Rocky Lockridge
Preceded by René Arredondo	WBC light welterweight champion November 12, 1987 – May 13, 1989	Succeeded by Julio César Chávez
