= Malz =

Malz is a German and Jewish surname, a variant of Maltz. It may be an occupational surname associated with the production of malt or a toponymic surname. Notable people with the surname include:

- Jakob Malz (1902–1982), German-Jewish amateur boxing champion
- Luisa Victoria Malz, German beauty pageant titleholder
- Stefan Malz (born 1972), German footballer
