= Pipino Cuevas vs. Thomas Hearns =

Boxing match

World War II
- Date: August 2, 1980
- Venue: Joe Louis Arena, Detroit, Michigan, U.S.
- Title(s) on the line: WBA welterweight title

Tale of the tape
Boxer	Pipino Cuevas	Thomas Hearns
Nickname		The Hitman
Hometown	Santo Tomás, Edomex, Mexico	Detroit, Michigan, U.S.
Purse	$1,500,000	$500,000
Pre-fight record	27–6 (24 KO)	28–0 (26 KO)
Age	22 years, 7 months	21 years, 9 months
Height	5 ft 8 in (173 cm)	6 ft 1 in (185 cm)
Weight	146 1/2 lb (66 kg)	146 lb (66 kg)
Style	Orthodox	Orthodox
Recognition	WBA; Welterweight Champion	USBA welterweight champion

Result
- Hearns wins via TKO in the second round

Pipino Cuevas vs. Thomas Hearns, billed as World War II, was a professional boxing match contested on August 2, 1980, for the WBA welterweight title.

== Background ==
Following an impressive 28–0 start to his career, Thomas Hearns was installed as the top contender to WBA welterweight champion Pipino Cuevas with the bout being announced in June 1980 to take place in August in Hearns hometown of Detroit, Michigan. The 21-year old Hearns had won all but two of his 28 fights by knockout while the 22-year old Cuevas was in the midst of a four-year reign as WBA welterweight champion and had knocked out 11 opponents in his 12 title fights dating back to 1976, though at 6'1", Hearns possessed a four-inch height advantage over the 5'9" Cuevas. Hearns claimed to have "no fear" of Cuevas and stated "If I see an opening to get my right hand on him, then I think I'll knock him out."

The fight was scheduled shortly after the heavily hyped and much watched Leonard–Durán fight in which Durán had defeated Leonard to win the WBC's version of the welterweight title. Both Cuevas and Hearns expressed heavy interest in a possible unification match with Durán should they win this bout with Cuevas stating he would "outbrawl, outbox and outpunch" Durán while Hearns exclaimed that he "can't wait to get Durán" after defeating Cuevas.

== The fight ==
During the first round, Hearns, with a distinct height and reach advantage, used his left jab effectively to keep the much shorter Cuevas at bay and frequently hammered him with numerous combinations while Cuevas struggled to penetrate Hearns' defense leading to Hearns easily winning the round on the judges scorecards. Hearns continued to control the fight in the second round before landing a big right hand to Cuevas' head which dropped the champion face first to the canvas. Cuevas was able to answer the referee's 10-count and rose to his feet but was clearly hurt and on wobbly knees causing his manager Lupe Sanchez to enter the ring to prevent further damage which in turn led referee Stanley Christodoulou to end the fight and award Hearns the victory via technical knockout at 2:39 of the round.

== Fight card ==
Confirmed bouts:

Weight Class	Weight		vs.		Method	Round	Notes
Welterweight	147 lbs.	Thomas Hearns	def.	Pipino Cuevas (c)	TKO	2/15	^{Note 1}
Super Featherweight	130 lbs.	Yasutsune Uehara	def.	Samuel Serrano (c)	KO	6/15	^{Note 2}
Lightweight	135 lbs.	Hilmer Kenty (c)	def.	Young Ho Oh	TKO	9/15	^{Note 3}
Heavyweight	200+ lbs.	Randall "Tex" Cobb	def.	Earnie Shavers	TKO	8/10

^Note 1 For WBA Welterweight title
^Note 2 For WBA and The Ring Super Featherweight titles
^Note 3 For WBA lightweight title

== Broadcasting ==
Country	Broadcaster
United Kingdom	ITV

Preceded by vs. Harold Volbrecht	Pipino Cuevas's bouts 2 August 1980	Succeeded by vs. Bernardo Prada
Preceded by vs. Eddie Gazo	Thomas Hearns's bouts 2 August 1980	Succeeded by vs. Luis Primera
