= Wendy Maltz =

Sex therapist

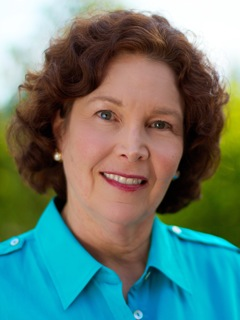
- Maltz at home in Eugene, OR 2011
- Born: Wendy Lee Becker; January 12, 1950 (age 76); Washington, D.C.
- Occupations: Sex therapist, psychotherapist, author, educator
- Website: http://www.healthysex.com

Wendy Maltz (born January 12, 1950) is an American sex therapist, psychotherapist, author, educator, and clinical social worker. She is an expert on the sexual repercussions of sexual abuse, understanding women's sexual fantasies, treating pornography-related problems, and promoting healthy sexuality. She has taught at the University of Oregon and, up until her retirement in 2016 from providing counseling services, was co-director with her husband, Larry Maltz, of Maltz Counseling Associates therapy practice in Eugene, Oregon.

== Personal life and education ==
Maltz graduated from the University of Colorado-Boulder with a bachelor of arts degree in Psychology. She also has a master's degree in social welfare from the University of California at Berkeley. She has been married to Larry Maltz, a sex and relationship therapist, since 1978. They live and work in Eugene, Oregon and have two grown children.

== Career ==
On October 25, 2014, Maltz received the Carnes Award from the Society for the Advancement of Sexual Health for her "outstanding work in the field of sexual addiction."

Maltz began her career as a therapist providing sexuality education in schools, counseling survivors of sexual abuse, and conducting sexual enrichment programs for pre-orgasmic women. Maltz was influenced by advancements in women's rights and sexual freedoms. In an article in Contemporary Sexuality, she explained, "I'm passionate about empowering women and men to overcome silence and unnecessary shame about sexual concerns."

Maltz has developed models for understanding healthy sexuality. These include the CERTS Conditions for Healthy Sexuality (consent, equality, respect, trust, and safety) model first described in Maltz, Wendy and Beverly Holman. Incest and Sexuality: A Guide to Understanding and Healing. Lanham: Lexington Books (1991) and The Maltz Hierarchy for Sexual Interaction. (Maltz, 1995).

Her work has been included and/or discussed in sexuality textbooks, including: Carroll, Janell, Sexuality Now: Embracing Diversity (2013) Cengage Learning: Belmont, CA; Kleinplatz, Peggy, New Directions in Sex Therapy (2012) Taylor & Francis Publishers: New York, NY; Wilmer, Graham, et al. Understanding and Treating the Life-Long Consequences of Childhood Sexual Abuse (2012) The Lantern Project, UK; Long, Lynn, Burnett, Judith & Thomas, Valerie, Sexuality Counseling: An Integrative Approach (2005) Pearson, Merrill, Prentice Hall Publishers: Upper Saddle River, NJ; Crooks, Robert & Karla Baur, Our Sexuality (5th edition, 1993) Benjamin Cummings Publishing: Redwood City, CA, pp. 498–501; Crooks, Robert & Karla Baur, Our Sexuality (11th edition, 2011) Cengage Learning: Belmont, CA; and; and, Katz, Lori S., Treating Military Sexual Trauma (2015) Springer Publishing, New York, NY.

Her books have been reviewed in Sexual and Relationship Therapy, Sexual Addiction and Compulsivity: The Journal of Treatment and Prevention, Journal of Poetry Therapy, The Electronic Journal of Human Sexuality, Annals of Behavioral Sciences and Medical Education, and Journal of Sex & Marital Therapy.

Maltz has been a keynote presenter, speaker and workshop presenter at psychology and sexuality conferences in the United States, Canada, and New Zealand. She presented a keynote address at the 2009 Utah Coalition Against Pornography on pornography problems and healthy sexuality that was made available online by UCAP in 2015. Maltz presented a keynote entitled, "Let's Talk About Sex: Sexual Nature, Harm and Healing", as well as an advanced workshop on "Healing Unwanted Sexual Fantasies" at the Society for the Advancement of Sexual Health 2015 annual conference in Philadelphia, PA.

=== Sexual abuse recovery ===
During her four-decade career, Maltz has written numerous books, chapters and articles on sexuality and sexual recovery topics (see Bibliography). Her first book, Incest and Sexuality: A Guide to Understanding and Healing (coauthored with Beverly Holman, 1987), was the first book to address the sexual problems caused by incest and remains a professional classic. It was followed by her most popular book, The Sexual Healing Journey: A Guide for Survivors of Sexual Abuse, which was also called a "classic" in Psychology Today.

An article in the Pandora's Box Newsletter (March 2013) included a detailed description and illustration of the "Drawing on Body" exercise.

In the fall of 2015, Maltz, along with Intervision Media Services, made both of her sexual healing videos, "Partners in Healing: Couples Overcoming the Sexual Repercussions of Incest," and "Relearning Touch: Healing Techniques for Couples" available for viewing at her HealthySex.com website.

In 2021 HarperCollinsMéxico published a Spanish-language edition of The Sexual Healing Journey, El viaje para sanar la sexualidad: Una guía para sobrevivientes de abuso sexual.

In 2022 Horusz, an imprint of Angyali Menedek, published a Hungarian edition of The Sexual Healing Journey, A Szexuális Gyógyulás Útján.

=== Pornography recovery ===
During the mid-2000s, with the growing proliferation of high-speed Internet pornography, Maltz began seeing increasing numbers of people in her therapy practice who were suffering from pornography-related problems. This occurrence led her to research and study how accessible, on-demand pornography was impacting sexuality and relationships, and what interventions were helpful to individuals and couples if they were experiencing negative consequences from using pornography. Maltz and her husband, Larry Maltz, coauthored a sexual recovery book entitled, The Porn Trap: The Essential Guide to Overcoming Problems Caused by Pornography, which describes serious porn-related problems, such as pornography addiction and intimate relationship concerns, and provides strategies and techniques for effectively addressing them. In a 2009 article in The Daily Beast/Newsweek discussing potential negative effects of heavy porn use, Maltz recommends that pornography, like cigarettes, be subject to regulation and warning labels. "I often feel like doctors must have in the 1950s," she said, "seeing firsthand the devastating consequences of cigarette smoking while living in a society that continues to glamorize use, ignore research, overlook consequences and resist regulation."

== Media ==
Maltz has been written about in publications such as Salon, Self, Therapy Today, Psychology Today, The Daily Beast/Newsweek, Mother Jones, Natural News, Times of India, New York Times, The Oregonian, The Register-Guard, Examiner, Bottomline Health, WebMD, Alternet, Metro, The Daily Emerald, St. George Utah News, The Atlantic, CBC News, Refinery29 , Irish Times, and O: The Oprah Magazine.

She has been written about in sexual recovery publications, including Pandora's Project Newsletter, Porn Addict Hubby, and Cybersolutions Today.

Maltz has also been interviewed on television and radio programs, and podcasts, discussing sexual healing from sexual abuse, sexual fantasies, porn addiction recovery, and sexual love poetry.

Singer/songwriter Alanis Morissette features Maltz in her "Conversation with Alanis" podcast series, Episode No. 5, with Maltz discussing a variety of intimacy topics, including sex, love, porn issues, fantasies, and sexual healing.

== Bibliography ==
- Maltz, Wendy and Beverly Holman. Incest and Sexuality: A Guide to Understanding and Healing. Lanham: Lexington Books (1991). ISBN 0669140856
- Maltz, Wendy and Suzie Boss. In the Garden of Desire: The Intimate World of Women's Sexual Fantasies. New York: Broadway Books (1997). ISBN 0553067702
- Maltz, Wendy & Suzie Boss (with foreword by Beverly Whipple). Private Thoughts: Exploring the Power of Women's Sexual Fantasies. Charleston: BookSurge Publishing (2008). ISBN 1419690701
- Maltz, Wendy & Suzie Boss (with foreword by Beverly Whipple). Private Thoughts: Exploring the Power of Women's Sexual Fantasies. Novato: New World Library (2012).
- Maltz, Wendy (with Thomas Moore). Intimate Kisses: The Poetry of Sexual Pleasure. Novato: New World Library (2003). ISBN 157731445X
- Maltz, Wendy (with forwards by Molly Peacock and Barry McCarthy). Passionate Hearts: The Poetry of Sexual Love. Novato: New World Library (2006). ISBN 1577315677
- Maltz, Wendy & Lori S. Katz. "Healthy Sexual Functioning After Military Sexual Trauma: An Interview With Wendy Maltz" in Treating Military Sexual Trauma, Springer Publishing: New York, NY (2015). ISBN 9780826127785
- Maltz, Wendy & Larry Maltz. The Porn Trap: The Essential Guide to Overcoming Problems Caused by Pornography. New York: William Morrow Paperbacks (2009). ISBN 0061231878
- Maltz, Wendy (2009). "Out of the Shadow (aka Is Porn Bad for You?)." The Psychotherapy Networker, Nov–Dec.
- Maltz, Wendy. The Sexual Healing Journey: A Guide for Survivors of Sexual Abuse. New York: William Morrow Paperbacks (2012). ISBN 0062130730
- Maltz, Wendy. (1988). "Identifying and Treating the Sexual Repercussions of Incest: A Couples Therapy Approach." Journal of Sex & Marital Therapy 14, (2) (Summer): 142–170.
- Maltz, Wendy. (1995). "The Maltz Hierarchy of Sexual Interaction." Sexual Addiction and Compulsivity 2, no. 1: 5–18.
- Maltz, Wendy (2002). "Treating the Sexual Intimacy Concerns of Sexual Abuse Survivors." Sexual and Relationship Therapy, Vol 17, No 4.
