= Yasutsune Uehara =

Japanese boxer (born 1949)

Yasutsune Uehara 上原 康恒
Personal information
- Nationality: Japanese
- Born: 12 October 1949 (age 76) Naha, Okinawa, USCAR (nowadays Japan)
- Height: 5 ft 5 in (165 cm)
- Weight: Super featherweight

Boxing career
- Reach: 68 in (173 cm)
- Stance: Orthodox

Boxing record
- Total fights: 32
- Wins: 27
- Win by KO: 21
- Losses: 5
Medal record
Men's Boxing
Representing Japan
Asian Games
Bronze medal – third place	1970 Bangkok	Light welterweight

Yasutsune Uehara (上原 康恒, Uehara Yasutsune; born October 12, 1949 in Okinawa, Japan) is a former professional boxer and former WBA and lineal super featherweight champion. He is one of the few Japanese boxers to have won the world title fighting outside Japan.

== Biography ==
Uehara was born in Naha, Okinawa. He won the inter-high school boxing tournament in his senior year in high school, and moved on to Nihon University, where he won amateur titles in two weight classes, compiling a distinguished amateur record of 117–8 (87RSC). He was already touted as the next Japanese world champion when he announced his decision to turn professional.

Uehara made his debut on November 14, 1972, with a fourth-round knockout in Honolulu, Hawaii. He suffered his first professional loss in his second fight. He returned to Japan after five fights in the United States.

He won nine fights in a row after returning to Japan, including seven victories by knockout. Uehara returned to the United States in August, 1974 to challenge WBA super featherweight champion Ben Villaflor, but lost by second-round knockout.

Uehara won the Japanese super featherweight title on July 21, 1971, knocking out his opponent in the first round. He defended the title a total of ten times, a considerable number of defenses for a regional title.

Uehara was once again ranked as the number one WBA super featherweight challenger in 1980, and challenged Samuel Serrano for the Lineal and WBA super featherweight titles on the undercard of Thomas Hearns' win over José Cuevas in Detroit. Uehara was losing on all three judges' scorecards before connecting with a right hook to knock out the defending champion in the sixth round. Uehara's victory was named The Ring's 1980 upset of the year.

Uehara defended his title in November 1980, before meeting Serrano for the second time in April 1981. He lost the rematch by unanimous decision, and announced his retirement shortly afterwards. His record was 27-5-0 (21KOs).

== Professional boxing record ==
32 fights	27 wins	5 losses
By knockout	21	1
By decision	6	4

No.	Result	Record	Opponent	Type	Round, time	Date	Location	Notes
32	Loss	27–5	Samuel Serrano	UD	15	Apr 9, 1981	Prefectural Gymnasium, Wakayama, Japan	Lost WBA and The Ring super featherweight titles
31	Win	27–4	Leonel Hernandez	SD	15	Nov 20, 1980	Kokugikan, Tokyo, Japan	Retained WBA and The Ring super featherweight titles
30	Win	26–4	Samuel Serrano	KO	6 (15), 2:59	Aug 2, 1980	Joe Louis Arena, Detroit, Michigan, U.S.	Won WBA and The Ring super featherweight titles
29	Win	25–4	Blazer Okubo	KO	5 (10), 2:23	Mar 18, 1980	Japan	Retained Japanese super featherweight title
28	Win	24–4	Kojiro Sasaki	KO	10 (10), 2:39	Nov 10, 1979	Naha, Japan	Retained Japanese super featherweight title
27	Win	23–4	Yoshitaka Ikehara	PTS	10	Jul 12, 1979	Korakuen Hall, Tokyo, Japan	Retained Japanese super featherweight title
26	Win	22–4	Yasuhide Takahashi	KO	6 (10)	Feb 27, 1979	Japan	
25	Win	21–4	Hideyoshi Horinaga	KO	2 (10), 0:50	Nov 25, 1978	Korakuen Hall, Tokyo, Japan	Retained Japanese super featherweight title
24	Win	20–4	Tatsuya Moriyasu	KO	2 (10)	Aug 9, 1978	Omiya, Japan	
23	Win	19–4	Ryu Fukita	KO	7 (10), 1:50	Apr 28, 1978	Japan	Retained Japanese super featherweight title
22	Win	18–4	Tadashi Akiyama	RTD	7 (10), 3:00	Dec 4, 1977	Korakuen Hall, Tokyo, Japan	Retained Japanese super featherweight title
21	Win	17–4	Suketoshi Maruyama	KO	6 (10)	Sep 9, 1977	Nagoya, Japan	
20	Win	16–4	Shoji Okano	KO	2 (10), 1:33	May 29, 1977	Onoyama Gym, Naha, Japan	Retained Japanese super featherweight title
19	Loss	15–4	Joe Lim	PTS	10	Nov 25, 1976	Manila, Philippines	
18	Win	15–3	Masa Ito	PTS	10	Jul 29, 1976	Japan	Won Japanese super featherweight title
17	Loss	14–3	Masa Ito	PTS	10	Apr 23, 1976	Tokuyama, Japan	Lost Japanese super featherweight title
16	Win	14–2	Susumu Okabe	KO	8 (10), 2:24	Dec 9, 1975	Japan	Retained Japanese super featherweight title
15	Win	13–2	Masa Ito	KO	5 (10), 2:21	Oct 19, 1975	City Gymnasium, Okinawa, Japan	Retained Japanese super featherweight title
14	Win	12–2	Susumu Okabe	KO	1 (10), 1:52	Jul 21, 1975	Korakuen Hall, Tokyo, Japan	Won Japanese super featherweight title
13	Win	11–2	Freddie Mensah	PTS	10	Nov 30, 1974	Akita City, Japan	
12	Loss	10–2	Ben Villaflor	KO	2 (15), 1:17	Aug 24, 1974	Honolulu International Center, Honolulu, Hawaii, U.S.	For WBA and The Ring super featherweight title
11	Win	10–1	Masaharu Tsuchiya	KO	1 (10)	May 28, 1974	Korakuen Hall, Tokyo, Japan	
10	Win	9–1	Kae Shik Yuh	KO	6 (12)	Mar 26, 1974	Nagoya, Japan	
9	Win	8–1	Ricardo Arredondo	UD	10	Nov 29, 1973	Onoyama Gym, Naha, Japan	
8	Win	7–1	Tokikazu Ichikawa	KO	3 (10)	Oct 28, 1973	Japan	
7	Win	6–1	Ricky Sawa	KO	6 (10)	Aug 4, 1973	Naha, Japan	
6	Win	5–1	Noriaki Yoshimura	KO	5 (10)	Jun 14, 1973	Japan	
5	Win	4–1	Danny Campos	TKO	6 (8)	Mar 12, 1973	Honolulu International Center, Honolulu, Hawaii, U.S.	
4	Win	3–1	Rogelio Tulunghari	TKO	1 (6)	Feb 13, 1973	Honolulu International Center, Honolulu, Hawaii, U.S.	
3	Win	2–1	Shichiro Saito	PTS	6	Dec 12, 1972	Honolulu International Center, Honolulu, Hawaii, U.S.	
2	Loss	1–1	Mar Yuzon	PTS	6	Nov 21, 1972	Honolulu International Center, Honolulu, Hawaii, U.S.	
1	Win	1–0	Sam Fraticelli	TKO	4 (6)	Nov 14, 1972	Honolulu International Center, Honolulu, Hawaii, U.S.	

== See also ==
- Lineal championship
- Boxing in Japan
- List of Japanese boxing world champions
- List of world super-featherweight boxing champions

Sporting positions
Regional boxing titles
Preceded by Susumu Okabe	Japanese super featherweight champion July 21, 1975 – April 23, 1976	Succeeded by Masa Ito
Preceded by Masa Ito	Japanese super featherweight champion July 29, 1976 – 1980; Vacated	Vacant Title next held by Hikaru Tomonari
World boxing titles
Preceded by Samuel Serrano	WBA super featherweight champion August 2, 1980 – April 9, 1981	Succeeded by Samuel Serrano
Preceded by Samuel Serrano	The Ring super featherweight champion August 2, 1980 – April 9, 1981	Succeeded by Samuel Serrano
Awards
Previous: Vito Antuofermo D10 vs. Marvelous Marvin Hagler	The Ring magazine Upset of the Year; KO6 vs. Samuel Serrano; 2011	Next: Roger Stafford W10 vs. Pipino Cuevas
