= Kenny Baysmore =

American boxer

Kenny Baysmore (born June 1, 1961 in Washington, D.C.), nicknamed The Technician, is an American former professional boxer.

Baysmore won the 1979 National Golden Gloves bantamweight title. He turned professional in 1981, and after a successful career start he was named The Ring Prospect of the Year in 1983. This award existed between 1983 and 1988, and among others it was issued to future world champions Mark Breland, Mike Tyson and Michael Moorer.

Baysmore won the USBA super featherweight title in 1984 TKOing Freddy Chumpitaz in the sixth round. After defending the title once he lost it to Roger Mayweather next year via a third round KO, losing his first fight after 20 victories. Mayweather went on to become a two-division world boxing champion and to fight Julio César Chávez twice, once for the WBC super featherweight title and once defending his WBC Super-Lightweight one, while Baysmore regained the vacated USBA title against Anthony English in 1986. He defended the title twice more, before losing it to Harold Knight in 1987.

Baysmore never fought for a major title again, his closest call being in 1994 when he lost to then reigning WBC lightweight world champion Miguel Ángel González in a non-title fight. He effectively finished his career in 1996, with one more fight in 2001. His professional record concluded 28-13-2, losing his last eight fights.

Preceded by (Established)	The Ring Prospect of the Year; 1983	Succeeded by Mark Breland
