= Ben Villaflor =

Filipino boxer

Personal information
- Born: Benjamin Villaflor; November 10, 1952 (age 73) Negros Occidental, Philippines
- Height: 5 ft 5 1/2 in (166 cm)
- Weight: Super-featherweight

Boxing career
- Reach: 67 in (170 cm)
- Stance: Southpaw

Boxing record
- Total fights: 68
- Wins: 54
- Win by KO: 31
- Losses: 6
- Draws: 6

Benjamin Villaflor (born November 10, 1952) is a Filipino former professional boxer who competed from 1966 to 1976. He was a two-time WBA and The Ring super-featherweight champion between 1972 and 1976.

== Professional boxing career ==
According to records, Villaflor began his career as a professional boxer when he was only thirteen years old, on October 1, 1966, beating Flash Javier by decision in four rounds. Most of Villaflor's early bouts' records were not well kept, therefore, although October 1, 1966 appears to have been the date of Villaflor's professional debut, this is not known with certainty, and neither is the location where the fight took place. Villaflor ran a record of twelve wins without a loss, with eight knockouts before he suffered his first loss, against Roger Boy Pedrano, by an eight-round decision in a fight apparently held on July 1, 1967, at the Philippines.

After winning his next fight, he faced Pedrano and again lost by decision, in another fight without much documented data.

Villaflor had his first documented fight on February 1, 1968, at Manila. Villaflor and Rod Sario had a technical draw (tie) after four rounds. Villaflor would have a total of seven draws in his professional boxing career, a relatively large number in that category.

Although Villaflor won nine, lost two and drew two of his next thirteen bouts, his fighting in the Philippines exclusively represented a problem for him to become known overseas. He began the 1970s by losing two ten-round decisions in a row, to Pedro Martinez on March 7, 1970, and to Alfredo Avila, six weeks later.

Villaflor won his next seventeen bouts, however, eleven of them by knockout. He moved to Honolulu, Hawaii, so he could get more exposure in the United States and the rest of the world. Villaflor liked Honolulu so much that he still lives in the Hawaiian city. He beat Rafael López by a first-round knockout, on April 13, 1971, in what represented both his first fight in Honolulu and also his first fight abroad. He also beat former world champion Raul Cruz, beaten by knockout in ten rounds, November 11, 1971.

On April 25, 1972, Villaflor was given his first opportunity at a world title, when faced with WBA and Lineal Jr. Lightweight champion Alfredo Marcano of Venezuela. Villaflor became world champion by defeating Marcano by a fifteen-round unanimous decision at Honolulu.

Villaflor then engaged in a series of non-title bouts, including one against Roberto Durán world title challenger Jimmy Robertson, beaten by Villaflor by a ten-round decision on November 15 of that year. Prior to that, he had retained the title with a fifteen-round draw against Victor Echegaray, on September 25.

On March 12, 1973, Villaflor lost his title for the first time, being beaten on points by Japan's Kuniaki Shibata over fifteen rounds in Honolulu. But, after two knockout wins, Villaflor had a rematch with Shibata, also in Honolulu, and he recovered the WBA world Jr. Lightweight championship with a first-round knockout, on October 17, also at Honolulu.

Next for Villaflor was a widely expected fight across Asia, as he met Japan's top rated challenger, Apollo Yoshio, on March 14, 1974, at Toyama. The two boxers fought to a fifteen-round draw. After another non-title win, Villaflor met future world champion Yasutsune Uehara, on August 24 in Honolulu, knocking out Uehara in the second round. After that, Villaflor made his mainland United States debut, when he and perennial challenger Ray Lunny III fought to a six-round technical draw on November 14, a cut on Villaflor's head which had been caused by a headbutt being the determining factor for the fight to end with such result.

Villaflor retained the title twice more, then met Samuel Serrano for the first time, on April 13, 1976, in Honolulu, and the two combatants fought to a fifteen-round draw. The draw was so controversial that the WBA ordered an immediate rematch. After winning a non-title bout by knockout, Villaflor traveled to Puerto Rico for the rematch, held on November 16, at Hiram Bithorn stadium, in San Juan. Serrano outpointed Villaflor over fifteen rounds in what turned out to be Villaflor's last professional bout.

He is currently involved in managing other boxers' careers. Villaflor was the Sergeant At Arms for the Hawaii State Senate, a position to which he was appointed by a vote of the Senate each year. He retired from his Sergeant At Arms position on September 30, 2026.

== Professional boxing record ==
| 68 fights | 56 wins | 6 losses |
|---|---|---|
| By knockout | 31 | 0 |
| By decision | 25 | 6 |
| Draws | 6 | |

| No. | Result | Record | Opponent | Type | Round(s), time | Date | Age | Location | Notes |
|---|---|---|---|---|---|---|---|---|---|
| 68 | Loss | 56–6–6 | Samuel Serrano | UD | 15 | Oct 16, 1976 | 23 years, 341 days | Hiram Bithorn Stadium, San Juan, Puerto Rico | Lost WBA and The Ring super featherweight titles |
| 67 | Win | 56–5–6 | Rogelio Castaneda | UD | 10 | Aug 31, 1976 | 23 years, 295 days | Blaisdell Center Arena, Honolulu, Hawaii, U.S. | |
| 66 | Draw | 55–5–6 | Samuel Serrano | SD | 15 | Apr 13, 1976 | 23 years, 155 days | Blaisdell Center Arena, Honolulu, Hawaii, U.S. | Retained WBA and The Ring super featherweight titles |
| 65 | Win | 55–5–5 | Morito Kashiwaba | KO | 13 (15), 1:29 | Jan 12, 1976 | 23 years, 63 days | Korakuen Hall, Tokyo, Japan | Retained WBA and The Ring super featherweight titles |
| 64 | Win | 54–5–5 | Hyun Chi Kim | SD | 15 | Mar 13, 1975 | 22 years, 123 days | Araneta Coliseum, Barangay Cubao, Quezon City, Metro Manila, Philippines | Retained WBA and The Ring super featherweight titles |
| 63 | Draw | 53–5–5 | Ray Lunny III | TD | 6 (10) | Nov 14, 1974 | 22 years, 4 days | Cow Palace, Daly City, California, U.S. | |
| 62 | Win | 53–5–4 | Yasutsune Uehara | KO | 2 (15), 1:17 | Aug 24, 1974 | 21 years, 287 days | Honolulu International Center, Honolulu, Hawaii, U.S. | Retained WBA and The Ring super featherweight titles |
| 61 | Win | 52–5–4 | Takao Maruki | TKO | 7 (10), 0:47 | Jul 19, 1974 | 21 years, 251 days | Araneta Coliseum, Barangay Cubao, Quezon City, Metro Manila, Philippines | |
| 60 | Draw | 51–5–4 | Apollo Yoshio | SD | 15 | Mar 14, 1974 | 21 years, 124 days | City Gymnasium, Toyama, Japan | Retained WBA and The Ring super featherweight titles |
| 59 | Win | 51–5–3 | Kuniaki Shibata | KO | 1 (15), 1:56 | Oct 17, 1973 | 20 years, 341 days | Honolulu International Center, Honolulu, Hawaii, U.S. | Won WBA and The Ring super featherweight titles |
| 58 | Win | 50–5–3 | Akihiro Kawasaki | KO | 3 (10), 2:20 | Aug 21, 1973 | 20 years, 284 days | Honolulu International Center, Honolulu, Hawaii, U.S. | |
| 57 | Win | 49–5–3 | Kenji Iwata | KO | 1 (10), 2:58 | Jul 18, 1973 | 20 years, 250 days | Honolulu International Center, Honolulu, Hawaii, U.S. | |
| 56 | Loss | 48–5–3 | Kuniaki Shibata | UD | 15 | Mar 12, 1973 | 20 years, 122 days | Honolulu International Center, Honolulu, Hawaii, U.S. | Lost WBA and The Ring super featherweight titles |
| 55 | Win | 48–4–3 | Juan Collado | UD | 10 | Jan 30, 1973 | 20 years, 81 days | Honolulu International Center, Honolulu, Hawaii, U.S. | |
| 54 | Win | 47–4–3 | Jimmy Robertson | UD | 10 | Nov 14, 1972 | 20 years, 4 days | Honolulu International Center, Honolulu, Hawaii, U.S. | |
| 53 | Draw | 46–4–3 | Victor Federico Echegaray | SD | 15 | Sep 5, 1972 | 19 years, 300 days | Honolulu International Center, Honolulu, Hawaii, U.S. | Retained WBA and The Ring super featherweight titles |
| 52 | Win | 46–4–2 | Carlos Fernandez | TKO | 3 (10), 1:37 | Jul 5, 1972 | 19 years, 167 days | Honolulu International Center, Honolulu, Hawaii, U.S. | |
| 51 | Win | 45–4–2 | Alfredo Marcano | UD | 15 | Apr 25, 1972 | 19 years, 167 days | Honolulu International Center, Honolulu, Hawaii, U.S. | Won WBA and The Ring super featherweight titles |
| 50 | Win | 44–4–2 | Jose Luis Lopez | KO | 2 (10), 2:21 | Mar 7, 1972 | 19 years, 118 days | Honolulu International Center, Honolulu, Hawaii, U.S. | |
| 49 | Win | 43–4–2 | Frankie Crawford | TKO | 1 (10), 2:52 | Jan 25, 1972 | 19 years, 76 days | Honolulu International Center, Honolulu, Hawaii, U.S. | |
| 48 | Win | 42–4–2 | Ray Vega | KO | 7 (10), 1:39 | Dec 14, 1971 | 19 years, 34 days | Honolulu International Center, Honolulu, Hawaii, U.S. | |
| 47 | Win | 41–4–2 | Raul Cruz | TKO | 8 (10), 1:42 | Nov 16, 1971 | 19 years, 6 days | Honolulu International Center, Honolulu, Hawaii, U.S. | |
| 46 | Win | 40–4–2 | Ricardo Garcia | UD | 10 | Sep 28, 1971 | 18 years, 322 days | Honolulu International Center, Honolulu, Hawaii, U.S. | |
| 45 | Win | 39–4–2 | Tadashi Okamoto | KO | 1 (10), 0:50 | Sep 14, 1971 | 18 years, 308 days | Honolulu International Center, Honolulu, Hawaii, U.S. | |
| 44 | Win | 38–4–2 | Manuel Mendoza | UD | 10 | Aug 10, 1971 | 18 years, 273 days | Honolulu International Center, Honolulu, Hawaii, U.S. | |
| 43 | Win | 37–4–2 | Memin Hernandez | KO | 1 (10), 1:27 | Jul 6, 1971 | 18 years, 238 days | Honolulu International Center, Honolulu, Hawaii, U.S. | |
| 42 | Win | 36–4–2 | Jesus Mariscal | TKO | 4 (10), 1:26 | Jun 22, 1971 | 18 years, 224 days | Honolulu International Center, Honolulu, Hawaii, U.S. | |
| 41 | Win | 35–4–2 | Delfino Camacho | TKO | 2 (10) | Jun 8, 1971 | 18 years, 210 days | Honolulu International Center, Honolulu, Hawaii, U.S. | |
| 40 | Win | 34–4–2 | Jose Luis Martinez | KO | 5 (10), 1:02 | May 18, 1971 | 18 years, 189 days | Honolulu International Center, Honolulu, Hawaii, U.S. | |
| 39 | Win | 33–4–2 | Memo Morales | TKO | 6 (10), 2:37 | Apr 26, 1971 | 18 years, 167 days | Honolulu International Center, Honolulu, Hawaii, U.S. | |
| 38 | Win | 32–4–2 | Rafael Lopez | TKO | 1 (10), 1:43 | Apr 13, 1971 | 18 years, 154 days | Honolulu International Center, Honolulu, Hawaii, U.S. | |
| 37 | Win | 31–4–2 | Arturo "Baby" Lorona | PTS | 10 | Nov 14, 1970 | 18 years, 4 days | Quezon City, Metro Manila, Philippines | |
| 36 | Win | 30–4–2 | Don Johnson | TKO | 7 (10) | Sep 19, 1970 | 17 years, 313 days | Araneta Coliseum, Barangay Cubao, Quezon City, Metro Manila, Philippines | |
| 35 | Win | 29–4–2 | Tony Jumao As | PTS | 10 | Jul 25, 1970 | 17 years, 257 days | Araneta Coliseum, Barangay Cubao, Quezon City, Metro Manila, Philippines | |
| 34 | Win | 28–4–2 | Willie Asuncion | PTS | 10 | Jul 12, 1970 | 17 years, 244 days | Manila, Metro Manila, Philippines | |
| 33 | Win | 27–4–2 | Ernie Cruz | PTS | 10 | Jun 6, 1970 | 17 years, 208 days | Araneta Coliseum, Barangay Cubao, Quezon City, Metro Manila, Philippines | |
| 32 | Draw | 26–4–2 | Tony Jumao As | TD | 5 (10) | Feb 28, 1970 | 17 years, 110 days | Rizal Memorial Coliseum, Manila, Metro Manila, Philippines | |
| 31 | Win | 26–4–1 | Arturo Eracho | PTS | 10 | Dec 20, 1969 | 17 years, 40 days | Manila, Metro Manila, Philippines | |
| 30 | Win | 25–4–1 | Fil Del Mundo | PTS | 10 | Oct 4, 1969 | 16 years, 328 days | Manila, Metro Manila, Philippines | |
| 29 | Win | 24–4–1 | Marcial Macatangay Jr. | KO | 7 (10) | Aug 20, 1969 | 16 years, 283 days | Manila, Metro Manila, Philippines | |
| 28 | Win | 23–4–1 | Billy Cangas | PTS | 10 | Jul 7, 1969 | 16 years, 239 days | Quezon City, Metro Manila, Philippines | |
| 27 | Win | 22–4–1 | Boy Torno | PTS | 10 | May 1, 1969 | 16 | Philippines | Uncertain of date |
| 26 | Win | 21–4–1 | Baby Paramount | PTS | 10 | Mar 1, 1969 | 16 | Philippines | Date unknown |
| 25 | Win | 20–4–1 | Carlito Kid | PTS | 10 | Feb 1, 1969 | 16 | Philippines | Date unknown |
| 24 | Loss | 19–4–1 | Ely Yares | PTS | 10 | Jul 1, 1968 | 15 | Philippines | Date unknown |
| 23 | Win | 19–3–1 | Flash Barba | KO | 8 (?) | Jun 1, 1968 | 15 | Philippines | Date unknown |
| 22 | Loss | 18–3–1 | Baby Paramount | PTS | 10 | Apr 10, 1968 | 15 | Philippines | Date unknown |
| 21 | Win | 18–2–1 | Tanny Amancio | KO | 7 (10) | Apr 1, 1968 | 15 | Philippines | Date unknown |
| 20 | Win | 17–2–1 | Ver Quizon | PTS | 10 | Mar 1, 1968 | 15 | Philippines | Date unknown |
| 19 | Win | 16–2–1 | Rocky Villahermosa | KO | 5 (?) | Feb 10, 1968 | 15 | Philippines | Date unknown |
| 18 | Draw | 15–2–1 | Blackie Olympia | PTS | 10 | Jan 1, 1968 | 15 | Philippines | Date unknown |
| 17 | Win | 15–2 | Flash Barba | PTS | 10 | Nov 1, 1967 | 14 | Philippines | Date unknown |
| 16 | Win | 14–2 | Boy Olayan | PTS | 8 | Oct 1, 1967 | 14 | Philippines | Date unknown |
| 15 | Loss | 13–2 | Roger Boy Pedrano | PTS | 8 | Sep 1, 1967 | 14 | Philippines | Date unknown |
| 14 | Win | 13–1 | Ben Aranas | KO | 8 (?) | Aug 1, 1967 | 14 | Philippines | Date unknown |
| 13 | Loss | 12–1 | Roger Boy Pedrano | PTS | 8 | Jul 1, 1967 | 14 | Philippines | Date unknown |
| 12 | Win | 12–0 | Little Pedring | PTS | 6 | Jun 1, 1967 | 14 | Philippines | Date unknown |
| 11 | Win | 11–0 | Young Francisco | KO | 3 (?) | May 1, 1967 | 14 | Philippines | Date unknown |
| 10 | Win | 10–0 | Luis Manuel | PTS | 6 | Apr 1, 1967 | 14 | Philippines | Date unknown |
| 9 | Win | 9–0 | Matt Villa | KO | 3 (?) | Mar 1, 1967 | 14 | Philippines | Date unknown |
| 8 | Win | 8–0 | Johnny Lozaga | KO | 6 (?) | Feb 1, 1967 | 14 | Philippines | Date unknown |
| 7 | Win | 7–0 | Eddie Valdez | PTS | 6 | Jan 1, 1967 | 14 | Philippines | Date unknown |
| 6 | Win | 6–0 | Joe Louis | KO | 1 (?) | Dec 10, 1966 | 14 | Philippines | Date unknown |
| 5 | Win | 5–0 | Rocky Romeo | KO | 4 (?) | Dec 1, 1966 | 14 | Philippines | Date unknown |
| 4 | Win | 4–0 | Pat Masong | KO | 4 (?) | Nov 10, 1966 | 14 | Philippines | Date unknown |
| 3 | Win | 3–0 | Bob Rule | PTS | 4 | Nov 1, 1966 | 13 | Philippines | Date unknown |
| 2 | Win | 2–0 | Little Timoteo | KO | 3 (?) | Oct 10, 1966 | 13 | Philippines | Date unknown |
| 1 | Win | 1–0 | Flash Javier | PTS | 4 | Oct 1, 1966 | 13 | Zamboanga City, Philippines | Date unknown |

== See also ==
- List of super featherweight boxing champions
- List of WBA world champions

Sporting positions
World boxing titles
| Preceded by Alfredo Marcano | WBA super-featherweight champion April 25, 1972 – March 12, 1973 | Succeeded by Kuniaki Shibata |
| Preceded by Alfredo Marcano | The Ring super-featherweight champion April 25, 1972 – March 12, 1973 | Succeeded by Kuniaki Shibata |
| Preceded by Kuniaki Shibata | WBA super-featherweight champion October 17, 1973 – October 16, 1976 | Succeeded by Samuel Serrano |
| Preceded by Kuniaki Shibata | The Ring super-featherweight champion October 17, 1973 – October 16, 1976 | Succeeded by Samuel Serrano |
