= Samuel Serrano =

Puerto Rican boxer

Personal information
- Nickname: El Torbellino (The Whirlwind)
- Nationality: Puerto Rican
- Born: November 17, 1952 (age 73) Toa Alta, Puerto Rico
- Height: 5 ft 8 1/2 in (174 cm)
- Weight: Featherweight; Super featherweight

Boxing career
- Reach: 71 in (180 cm)
- Stance: Orthodox

Boxing record
- Total fights: 57
- Wins: 50
- Win by KO: 17
- Losses: 6
- Draws: 1

Samuel Serrano (born November 17, 1952) is a Puerto Rican former professional boxer who competed from 1969 to 1984 and made a two-fight comeback from 1996 to 1997. He was a two-time super featherweight world champion, having held the WBA title twice between 1976 and 1983.

According to Serrano during a 2017 interview with El Nuevo Dia newspaper, he learned to box starting at age 5 when he lived at Palmarejos barrio in Corozal.

== Professional boxing career ==
External videos
- You may watch Samuel Serrano vs Benedicto Villablanca on YouTube

Serrano, owner of long arms, began his career on October 29, 1969, with a third-round knockout win over Ramon Laureano. He built a fan base in Puerto Rico, campaigning there for his first 23 bouts, including winning and losing the Puerto Rican Featherweight title v.s Francisco Villegas. For his 24th bout, he traveled to Panama City, where he met future world Featherweight champion Ernesto Marcel, who beat him on points in 10 rounds. That would be his last defeat in a long time.

He then continued his winning ways, including a 10-round decision win over tough veteran Cocoa Perez and one win over future title challenger Diego Alcala of Panama, also by decision in 10. Serrano then travelled in 1976 to Honolulu, Hawaii, to meet reigning Lineal and WBA world jr. Lightweight champion, the Filipino Ben Villaflor. By most writer's accounts, Serrano beat Villaflor, but he had to return home only with a 15-round draw (tie).

The WBA ordered an immediate rematch, and so on October 16 of the same year, Villaflor went to San Juan to defend his title for the second time vs. Serrano. Serrano beat Villaflor by using his ring technique to win 12 of the 15 rounds on each judges' scorecards. As life had it, Samuel Serrano was destined to become a world champion in front of his fans.

Serrano became a traveling champion, defending his title in places like Venezuela, Ecuador, South Africa, Japan (twice) and, of course, Puerto Rico. One of his defenses, against Julio "Diablito" Valdez, resulted in an after-fight brawl when Serrano was announced as winner by a unanimous decision and went to greet his rival but was received with a punch to the face. Serrano retaliated, and police intervention was needed. Both fighters were escorted to their dressing rooms by the police. But disaster struck for Serrano in Detroit on August 2 of 1980, when, after leading on all scorecards, he was struck by a Yasutsune Uehara right hand to the chin in round six, and lost his title by knockout to the Japanese. After that loss, he set his eyes on recovering his world title from the Japanese world champion, and so on April 9, 1981, they met again, this time in Wakayama, Japan. Serrano was more cautious this time, and didn't try to go for the knockout after building a points lead. Even though Uehara was fighting in his homeland, all judges agreed and gave Serrano more rounds than they gave Uehara, and Serrano the world title back by a fifteen-round unanimous decision.

Serrano made two defenses and then went to Chile to give challenger Benedicto Villablanca a chance at the title on June 3, 1982. It proved to be a highly controversial fight. After 5 rounds, Serrano was ahead on the scorecards. However, a cut appeared over his eye during the 6th, and the referee ruled it to be from a punch. Serrano kept fighting, but during the 11th round, the cut was so deep, the fight had to be stopped by the doctor and Serrano had to be taken to a Santiago hospital. Since the referee ruled the cut came from a punch, initially the fight and the world title were given to Villablanca.

Serrano and his corner filed a complaint, however, claiming the cut had been caused by a headbutt instead, and upon review at the WBA's Panama City offices, WBA officials announced they had effectively seen the headbutt that Serrano claimed opened his cut happen. So the WBA decided the cut had come from a headbutt, and the judges' scorecards were reviewed. They had Serrano ahead on points after 10 rounds, so the fight, and the crown, were given back to Serrano by a technical decision.

In his next defense he met the younger and physically stronger Roger Mayweather. Serrano and Mayweather gave it a good fight for most of 7 rounds, but Serrano was weakened by a barrage of punches towards the end of the 7th, and downed with a right hand in the 8th, this time, losing the title definitively.

== Retirement ==
Serrano retired from the ring for one year and came back in 1984, winning by first round knockout. Then, he retired again.

In 1996, Serrano won the Puerto Rican Lightweight title vs Sammy Mejias on a 12-round decision, and he also won a 10-round decision vs Anthony Ivory in 1997. Serrano retired after the Ivory fight with a final record of 50 wins, 5 defeats and 17 knockouts.

He made a television commercial for Budweiser in Puerto Rico in 1982.

As of 2017, Serrano was living in a beach house at Islote, ciudad de Arecibo. He dedicated himself to fixing beachfront apartments and renting them, as well as to creating mosaic art, some of which he sold.

== Professional boxing record ==
57 fights	50 wins	6 losses
By knockout	17	2
By decision	33	4
Draws	1	

No.	Result	Record	Opponent	Type	Round	Date	Location	Notes
57	Win	50–6–1	Anthony Ivory	PTS	10	Nov 6, 1997	Dorado, Puerto Rico	
56	Win	49–6–1	Sammy Mejias	UD	10	Jul 14, 1996	Bayamon, Puerto Rico	
55	Win	48–6–1	Candido Santamaria	KO	1 (?)	May 26, 1984	Mets Pavilion, Guaynabo, Puerto Rico	
54	Loss	47–6–1	Roger Mayweather	TKO	8 (15)	Jan 19, 1983	Hiram Bithorn Stadium, San Juan, Puerto Rico	Lost WBA and The Ring super featherweight titles
53	Win	47–5–1	Benedicto Villablanca	TD	11 (15)	Jul 5, 1982	Teatro Caupolican, Santiago, Chile	Retained WBA and The Ring super featherweight titles
52	Win	46–5–1	Hikaru Tomonari	TKO	12 (15)	Dec 10, 1981	Coliseo Roberto Clemente, San Juan, Puerto Rico	Retained WBA and The Ring super featherweight titles
51	Win	45–5–1	Leonel Hernandez	UD	15	Jul 29, 1981	El Poliedro, Caracas, Venezuela	Retained WBA and The Ring super featherweight titles
50	Win	44–5–1	Yasutsune Uehara	UD	15	Apr 9, 1981	Prefectural Gymnasium, Wakayama, Japan	Won WBA and The Ring super featherweight titles
49	Win	43–5–1	Jesus Delgado	KO	2 (?)	Sep 20, 1980	San Juan, Puerto Rico	
48	Loss	42–5–1	Yasutsune Uehara	KO	6 (15)	Aug 2, 1980	Joe Louis Arena, Detroit, Michigan, U.S.	Lost WBA and The Ring super featherweight titles
47	Win	42–4–1	Battlehawk Kazama	TKO	13 (15)	Apr 3, 1980	Central Gymnasium, Nara, Japan	Retained WBA and The Ring super featherweight titles
46	Win	41–4–1	Nkosana Mgxaji	TKO	8 (15)	Dec 9, 1979	Goodwood Showgrounds, Cape Town, South Africa	Retained WBA and The Ring super featherweight titles
45	Win	40–4–1	Julio Valdez	UD	15	Feb 18, 1979	San Juan, Puerto Rico	Retained WBA and The Ring super featherweight titles
44	Win	39–4–1	Takao Maruki	UD	15	Nov 29, 1978	Aichi Prefectural Gym, Nagoya, Japan	Retained WBA and The Ring super featherweight titles
43	Win	38–4–1	Young Ho Oh	RTD	9 (15)	Jul 8, 1978	San Juan, Puerto Rico	Retained WBA and The Ring super featherweight titles
42	Win	37–4–1	Mario Martínez	UD	15	Feb 18, 1978	San Juan, Puerto Rico	Retained WBA and The Ring super featherweight titles
41	Win	36–4–1	Tae-Ho Kim	TKO	10 (15)	Nov 19, 1977	San Juan, Puerto Rico	Retained WBA and The Ring super featherweight titles
40	Win	35–4–1	Apollo Yoshio	UD	15	Aug 27, 1977	San Juan, Puerto Rico	Retained WBA and The Ring super featherweight titles
39	Win	34–4–1	Leonel Hernandez	UD	15	Jul 26, 1977	Gimnasio Luis Ramos, Puerto La Cruz, Venezuela	Retained WBA and The Ring super featherweight titles
38	Win	33–4–1	Alberto Herrera	KO	11 (15)	Jan 15, 1977	Plaza de Toros, Guayaquil, Ecuador	Retained WBA and The Ring super featherweight titles
37	Win	32–4–1	Ben Villaflor	UD	15	Oct 16, 1976	San Juan, Puerto Rico	Won WBA and The Ring super featherweight titles
36	Win	31–4–1	Adrian Villanueva	KO	2 (?)	Sep 10, 1976	Bayamon, Puerto Rico	
35	Win	30–4–1	Mar Basa	TKO	9 (10)	May 8, 1976	Bayamon, Puerto Rico	
34	Draw	29–4–1	Ben Villaflor	SD	15	Apr 13, 1976	Blaisdell Center Arena, Honolulu, Hawaii, U.S.	For WBA, and The Ring super featherweight titles
33	Win	29–4	Maneul Rodriguez	TKO	6 (?)	Dec 13, 1975	San Juan, Puerto Rico	
32	Win	28–4	Diego Alcala	PTS	10	Oct 11, 1975	San Juan, Puerto Rico	
31	Win	27–4	Ahmet Tosci	KO	2 (10)	Sep 1, 1975	San Juan, Puerto Rico	
30	Win	26–4	Victor Echegaray	PTS	10	Jul 28, 1975	San Juan, Puerto Rico	
29	Win	25–4	Jose Pena	PTS	10	Apr 12, 1975	San Juan, Puerto Rico	
28	Win	24–4	Memo Cruz	PTS	10	Nov 15, 1974	San Juan, Puerto Rico	
27	Win	23–4	Ezequiel Cocoa Sanchez	PTS	10	Jul 29, 1974	San Juan, Puerto Rico	
26	Win	22–4	Gustavo Briceno	KO	10 (12)	Jul 15, 1974	San Juan, Puerto Rico	Won Puerto Rican featherweight title
25	Win	21–4	Lorenzo Trujillo	PTS	10	Apr 15, 1974	San Juan, Puerto Rico	
24	Loss	20–4	Ernesto Marcel	SD	10	Dec 5, 1973	Gimnasio Nuevo Panama, Panama City, Panama	
23	Win	20–3	Jose Issac Martin	PTS	10	Jul 21, 1973	San Juan, Puerto Rico	
22	Win	19–3	Freddie Major	KO	1 (10)	Jun 10, 1973	San Juan, Puerto Rico	
21	Win	18–3	Terry Rondeau	KO	2 (?)	Apr 14, 1973	Carolina, Puerto Rico	
20	Win	17–3	John Howard	PTS	10	Mar 24, 1973	Carolina, Puerto Rico	
19	Win	16–3	Nestor Rojas	PTS	10	Feb 16, 1973	San Juan, Puerto Rico	
18	Win	15–3	Angel Rivera	PTS	12	Dec 9, 1972	Ponce, Puerto Rico	
17	Loss	14–3	Francisco Villegas	PTS	12	Apr 8, 1972	San Juan, Puerto Rico	Lost Puerto Rican featherweight title
16	Win	14–2	Angel Rivera	PTS	10	Dec 4, 1971	Ponce, Puerto Rico	
15	Win	13–2	Francisco Villegas	PTS	12	Oct 25, 1971	San Juan, Puerto Rico	Won Puerto Rican featherweight title
14	Win	12–2	Braulio Rodriguez	PTS	10	July 3, 1971	San Juan, Puerto Rico	
13	Win	11–2	Gustavo Briceno	PTS	10	May 15, 1971	Ponce, Puerto Rico	
12	Loss	10–2	Fremio Jimenez	PTS	10	Mar 24, 1971	Santo Domingo, Dominican Republic	
11	Win	10–1	Wilson Yambo	PTS	10	Feb 4, 1971	Ponce, Puerto Rico	
10	Win	9–1	Modesto Concepcion	PTS	8	Oct 31, 1970	San Juan, Puerto Rico	
9	Win	8–1	Ramon Dominguez	PTS	6	Jun 6, 1970	San Juan, Puerto Rico	
8	Win	7–1	Modesto Concepcion	PTS	6	May 9, 1970	San Juan, Puerto Rico	
7	Win	6–1	Robert Guerrero	PTS	6	Apr 11, 1970	San Juan, Puerto Rico	
6	Win	5–1	Ramon Montes	PTS	6	Mar 14, 1970	San Juan, Puerto Rico	
5	Win	4–1	Modesto Escalera	PTS	6	Feb 14, 1970	San Juan, Puerto Rico	
4	Win	3–1	Sammy Correa	TKO	3 (?)	Jan 17, 1970	San Juan, Puerto Rico	
3	Loss	2–1	Enrique Roque	PTS	4	Dec 12, 1969	San Juan, Puerto Rico	
2	Win	2–0	Radames Pizzarro	PTS	4	Nov 13, 1969	San Juan, Puerto Rico	
1	Win	1–0	Ramon Laureano	KO	3 (?)	Nov 1, 1969	San Juan, Puerto Rico	

== See also ==
- List of world super-featherweight boxing champions
- List of Puerto Rican boxing world champions
- Sports in Puerto Rico
- Afro–Puerto Ricans

Sporting positions
World boxing titles
Preceded by Ben Villaflor	WBA super featherweight champion October 16, 1976 - August 2, 1980	Succeeded by Yasutsune Uehara
Preceded by Ben Villaflor	The Ring super featherweight champion October 16, 1976 - August 2, 1980	Succeeded by Yasutsune Uehara
Preceded by Yasutsune Uehara	WBA super featherweight champion April 9, 1981 - January 19, 1983	Succeeded by Roger Mayweather
Preceded by Yasutsune Uehara	The Ring super featherweight champion April 9, 1981 - January 19, 1983	Succeeded by Roger Mayweather
