= Daniel Maltzman =

American artist (born 1963)

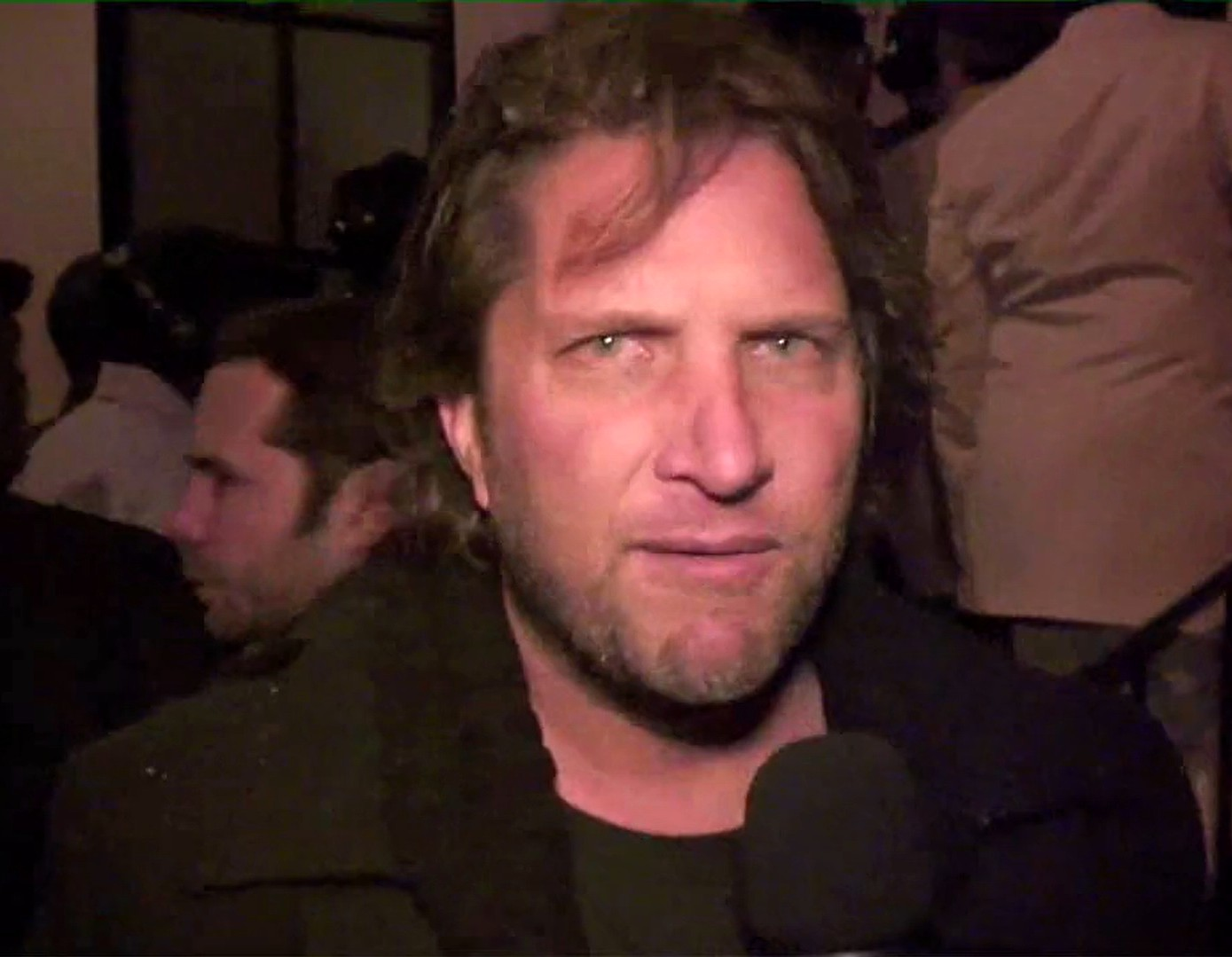
Maltzman in 2009

Daniel Maltzman (born March 9, 1963) is an American artist known for his Pop-Surrealist paintings. His work is contemporary and inspired by great artists in history, including Richter and Warhol. Maltzman focuses on drippy, layered abstracts, strong female forms, and a series of shadow figures. He lives and works in Los Angeles, California.

Maltzman's works are showcased in four galleries throughout the world, and is known for his frequent involvement with local charities. He and his art have been featured on television shows filmed in the Los Angeles Area.

== Works ==
=== Shadow Figures ===
As an early painter, inspired by Giacometti, Maltzman began his Shadow Figure series with Father and Daughter (1992). Ranging from singular figures to shadow groups, he captured an illusive form, highlighting light and dark. The series moved forward to colored shadow figures and panels. More than a decade later, Maltzman's Shadow Figures expanded to include Runway Shadow Figures (2003) which merged the original figures and those of fashion illustration. The Shadow Gallery also came about at this time, while Maltzman discovered an interest in perspective.

=== Babe ===
Maltzman's interest in the female form began early in his career with The Babe (1993). This bikini clad woman encompasses Maltzman's upbringing in Southern California. The woman is carefree and sun-kissed. Although each painting is unique and original, Maltzman continues to recreate this image.

=== Marilyn ===
Maltzman found Marilyn Monroe as a muse early on his career. The Marilyn series is ongoing. Portraits of Marilyn's face overlay Maltzman's abstract.

=== Abstracts ===
Inspired by Richter, Maltzman layers and pulls paints creating his bright and colorful abstracts. The drips Maltzman leaves behind have become an identifying feature to the artist's entire collection, especially his abstracts. These paintings can take anywhere from a month to three years to finish, as Maltzman often re-enters his abstract work. Most of these abstracts involve textured colors seeping through a more neutral top layer. Other types of abstracts include Maltzman's cubic abstract series. These panels, occasionally on wood rather than canvas, work singularly as thin pieces or come together as massive triptychs.

=== Women ===
Maltzman's largest series is entitled Women. The paintings consist of a female form overlaying a Maltzman abstract.

== Exhibitions ==
=== Solo exhibitions ===
2012 Permanent installation of new works. GALLERY-BEVERLY HILLS, CA 2008 “For A Cure”, LURIE GALLERY, Beverly Hills, CA

2004 “Women” THE FIGURATIVE GALLERY, La Quinta, CA

2003 MAGIDSON FINE ART GALLERY, Aspen, CO

2002 DON O’MELVENY GALLERY, Los Angeles, CA 2001 DENISE ROBERGE, Palm Desert, CA

2000 DESERT ART SOURCE, Rancho Mirage, CA

=== Group exhibitions ===
2012–Present CODA Gallery, Palm Desert, CA

2010 MELISA MORGAN FINE ART, Palm Desert, CA 2009–Present AMSTEL GALLERY, Amsterdam, the Netherlands 2009–Present RUSSEL COLLECTION, Austin, TX

2009–Present WEBER FINE ART, Greenwich, CT & Scarsdale, New York 2007–08 “Warhol and...” KANTOR FEUER GALLERY, Los Angeles, CA

2007–08 “Going to the Dogs” CATHERINE KELLEGHAN GALLERY Atlanta, GA

2005–08 “Pop” MODERN MASTERS FINE ART GALLERY, Palm Desert, CA

2004–08 “Shadows” SELBY FLEETWOOD GALLERY, Santa Fe, NM

2002 “Movement” BGH GALLERY, Bergamot Station, Santa Monica, CA

=== Museum exhibitions ===
2009–13 “Incognito” SANTA MONICA MUSEUM of ART, CA

2006 “Artists Emerging” LACMA, Los Angeles, CA

2006 HUNTSVILLE MUSEUM OF ART, Huntsville, AL

== Honors ==
2014 Official Artist of the Pebble Beach ProAm Golf Tournament

== Filmography ==
=== As himself ===
Year	Show	Notes
2009	The Millionaire Matchmaker	Various episodes
2009	Dog Whisperer	1 episode
2011	The Real Housewives of Orange County	1 episode
2013	The Real Housewives of Beverly Hills	Various episodes
2013	Astrid In Wonderland	1 episode
2014	Rich Kids of Beverly Hills	1 episode

=== Art appearances ===
The artwork of Daniel Maltzman has been featured on television shows such as: Don't Trust the B- in Apartment 23, Dirty Sexy Money, Dog Whisperer, MTV's Paris Hilton's New BFF, and Nip/Tuck.
