= Benedicto Villablanca =

Chilean boxer

Personal information
- Born: July 13, 1957 (age 69) Villarrica, Chile

Boxing career

Boxing record
- Total fights: 45
- Wins: 34
- Win by KO: 16
- Losses: 11

Benedicto Villablanca (born July 13, 1957) is a former professional boxer who came close to becoming Chile's first professional boxing world champion.

Villablanca was born in Villarrica, Chile. He became interested in boxing as a child. He started visiting his local boxing gym, and had a stellar amateur career.

At the age of 18, Villablanca started his career as a professional boxer, when he defeated Luis Conejeros by a decision in four rounds, on January 23, 1976, in Santiago. Villablanca obtained his first knockout during his second fight, beating Luis Arriagada in the second round on February 20, also in Santiago.

After two more victories, Villablanca was defeated for the first time, when he lost an eight-round decision to Juan Ule Castro on April 30, 1977 in Chiloé. He would lose his next fight, to Leopoldo Vargas, on May 7. After those two consecutive losses, Villablanca won one fight, then faced Vargas in a rematch, held on August 20, at Iquique. Villablanca suffered his first knockout loss, being beaten by Vargas in the seventh round.

After that loss, Villablanca embarked on a four fight winning streak. The first of those bouts, held on April 7, 1978, was for the Chilean Jr. Lightweight title. Villablanca became national champion by knocking Roberto Diaz out in the first round.

On January 20, 1979, Villablanca had his first fight as a professional abroad, when he faced Victor Etchegaray for the South American Jr. Lightweight championship in Bariloche, Argentina. Villablanca lost to Etchegaray, then a world ranked challenger, by knockout in round eight.

Back in Chile, Villablanca retained his Chilean Jr. Lightweight title with a victory over Diaz in a rematch, on March 3, 1979, by knockout in the eighth round. Like his first victory over Diaz, this represented the beginning of another four fight winning streak for Villablanca. He faced Etchegaray for the South American Jr. Lightweight title for a second time on June 8, 1980, losing by a seventh-round knockout in San Juan, Argentina.

Villablanca then embarked in an eleven fight winning streak, which included a twelve-round decision over Luis Bendezu on August 7, 1981, which made him the WBA's Fedelatin Jr. Lightweight champion. The victory over Bendezu also allowed Villablanca to become a ranked challenger in the Jr. Lightweight division. He also defeated Raul Silva, who had come off back to back losses to Eusebio Pedroza and Wilfredo Gómez. The win against Silva, a second-round knockout, came on December 28 of '81. This was followed by a victory over Julio Hernandez, who had also lost to Gómez in a WBC world Super Bantamweight championship try, by knockout in round three, on February 2, 1982.

After one more win, Villablanca had his first world title try. His fight against Puerto Rico's Samuel Serrano, it could be said, was both the defining moment of Villablanca's career and one of the most controversial championship fights of the 1980s.

On June 5 in Santiago, four months after his victory over Julio Hernandez, Villablanca challenged Serrano, for the WBA's world Jr. Lightweight title. Serrano started bleeding during round six, and the fight's referee declared that Serrano's cut was the product of a punch by Villablanca. When the fight was stopped in round eleven due to Serrano's cut, Villablanca was declared winner, and new WBA world Jr. Lightweight champion, by an eleventh-round knockout.

For some period afterwards, Villablanca became a national hero among his countrymen and women, just like Martin Vargas had. Villablanca and his compatriots thought that Villablanca had earned Chile's first world boxing championship. Serrano's team appealed the fight's result, however, claiming that the cut on Serrano's head was caused by a headbutt, not a punch. The WBA then held an emergency meeting in Panama City, Panama, to review the fight's tapes. After studying the fight, WBA officials concluded that Serrano and his team were right and the cut was produced by a headbutt. The WBA took into account the fact that Serrano was ahead on the judges' scorecards and reversed the fight's result, giving Serrano an eleventh round technical decision win. It shall be mentioned that the WBA's ruling in this case disqualified Villablanca as world champion, so Villablanca is not, officially speaking, recognized as a former world boxing champion.

After the disappointment of seeing his world champion status disappear, Villablanca returned to professional boxing with three consecutive victories, including a ten-round decision over Geronimo Luque.

On August 17, 1983, Villablanca made his United States debut, when he challenged Roger Mayweather for the WBA world Jr. Lightweight title that Mayweather had earned by knocking Serrano out in eight rounds at San Juan. There would be no controversy this time around, however, as Villablanca was dropped twice before the fight ended just as the bell rang to finish round one, with Mayweather retaining the title by a first-round knockout.

Villablanca announced his retirement from boxing after the fight, but he returned soon afterwards. In his first comeback fight, Villablanca faced Orlando Romero, losing a ten-round decision on January 14, 1984 in Trujillo, Peru. On May 19, he fought in Peru once again, losing in a rematch with Geronimo Luque for the WBC Continental Americas Lightweight title in Lima, by a knockout in round seven.

Villablanca won his next four bouts, but, after losing on December 20, 1985 to Ricardo Toledo by a knockout in three rounds in Santiago, he retired from professional boxing for good.

Villablanca had a professional record of 34 wins and 11 losses in 45 fights, with 16 wins by knockout.
