= New Directions in Sex Therapy =

2001 book

New Directions in Sex Therapy: Innovations and Alternatives
- Editor: Peggy J. Kleinplatz
- Language: English
- Subject: Non-fiction, Biography
- Published: 2001 (Brunner-Routledge, Taylor & Francis)
- Publication place: Canada
- Media type: Print (hardback, paperback)
- Pages: 375
- ISBN: 9780876309674
- OCLC: 804013010

New Directions in Sex Therapy: Innovations and Alternatives is a 2001 book by the Canadian sexologist Peggy J. Kleinplatz. It provides alternatives to the then conventional clinical strategies of treating sexual problems with medical and drug interventions.

== Contents ==
Introduction: A Critical Evaluation of Sex Therapy: Room for Improvement, Peggy Kleinplatz
Part I: Critiques of Conventional Models of Sex Therapy.
What the Sex Therapies Tell Us about Sex, Bernard Apfelbaum
Feminist Critique of Sex Therapy: Foregrounding the Politics of Sex, Leonore Tiefer
Challenging Dominant Discourses of Male (Hetero)Sexuality: The Clinical Implications of New Voices about Male Sexuality, Gary R. Brooks
Phenomenology of Sexuality, Christopher M. Aanstoos
Paraphilia: Another Confused Sexological Concept, Charles Moser
The Hazards of Safer Sex or a Critique of the Goals of Sex Therapy, Peggy Kleinplatz
Part II: New Alternatives/Innovations in Sex Therapy
Feminist Theory in the Age of Viagra, Charles Moser, Wendy Stock
Intimacy-based Sex Therapy: Sexual Choreography, Carol Rinkleib Ellison
Approaching Sexual Potential in Relationship: A Reward of Age and Maturity, Jeanne Shaw
"What Works" in Sex Therapy: A Common Factors Perspective, Karen M. Donahey, Scott D. Miller
How Can Experiential Psychotherapy Help Transform the Field of Sex Therapy? Alvin R. Mahrer, Donald B. Boulet
Sex Therapy with Survivors of Sexual Abuse: An Integrative/Eclectic Approach, Wendy Maltz
Beyond Forever After: Narrative Therapy with Lesbian Couples, Marny Hall
Sex Therapy for Male Couples of Mixed (Serodiscordant) HIV Status, Alex Carballo-Dieguez, Robert Remien
Integrating Sexuality and Spirituality: A Group Therapy Approach to Women's Sexual Dilemmas, Gina Ogden
Conclusion, Peggy Kleinplatz

== Publishing history ==
- New Directions in Sex Therapy: Innovations and Alternatives, Brunner-Routledge (2001)
- New Directions in Sex Therapy: Innovations and Alternatives, 2nd ed. Brunner-Routledge (2012)

== Reception ==
Meg Barker, in a review of New Directions in Sex Therapy, wrote "it gives us a much-needed critique of existing ways of understanding, and working with, sex in the therapy room.", and although having concerns about the lack of a chapter on bisexuality and the apparent underlying assumption that relationships should be sexual, concluded "I hope that this collection will encourage practitioners to critically consider the assumptions and practices that they may be taking for granted, and to start out in a new alternative direction that is truly transformative."

New Directions in Sex Therapy has also been reviewed by Sexual and Relationship Therapy, Psychotherapy in Australia, American Association for Marriage and Family Therapy, and the Journal of Psychology and Christianity.

It won the 2013 American Association for Marriage and Family Therapy (AASECT) Book Award, awarded to authors of "a book that makes a significant contribution to AASECTs vision of sexual health and to the clinical and educational standards of the field."
