= Eterna Inocencia =

Argentine rock band

- Origin: Quilmes
- Genres: Hardcore punk, melodic hardcore, emo, skate punk, alternative rock
- Years active: 1994–present
- Label: Discos del Sembrador
- Members: Guillermo Mármol; Roy Ota; Alejandro Navajas; Tomás Portela; Germán Rodriguez

Eterna Inocencia (Everlasting Innocence) is an Argentine rock band with politically motivated lyrics and opinions. Their origin dates to 1995, in the city of Quilmes, Buenos Aires Province. They come from the hardcore punk movement “Buenos Aires Hardcore” of the mid-1990s, from which many other important bands and musicians have flourished. They are considered to be the most influential and important band in South America in their genre, with a career spanning 30+ years and extensive non-stop live performances, touring and recording.

Conserving the trademark “do it yourself” work ethos, they are an independent group throughout the decades in their native Argentina. Their recorded material has been almost entirely released by their own independent label, called Discos Del Sembrador.

== Members ==
Current members

- Guillermo Mármol - lead vocals
- Roy Ota - lead guitar
- Alejandro Navajas - bass, backing vocals
- Tomás Portela - rhythm guitar, backing vocals
- Germán Rodriguez - drums

Former members

- Joan Sprei - drums
- Pablo Wilk - drums
- Tatán - bass
- Ero Javier "Cirilo" Pesquero - Guitar

== Discography ==
Studio albums

- Punkypatin (1995; La Unión)
- Días Tristes (1997; La Unión, Sniffing, W.C.)
- Recycle (1999; Sniffing)
- A Los Que Se Han Apagado (2001; Discos Del Sembrador)
- Las Palabras y los Ríos (2004; Discos Del Sembrador)
- La Resistencia (2006; Discos Del Sembrador)
- Ei (2009; Discos Del Sembrador)
- Entre Llanos y Antigales (2014; Discos Del Sembrador)
- No Bien Abran Las Flores (2022; Discos Del Sembrador)

Live albums

- Vivo Rock N Pop (2002; Discos Del Sembrador)
- Una Tarde Mágica CD/DVD (2004; Discos Del Sembrador, Activate)
- En Vivo 31/10/2009 (2011; Discos Del Sembrador)
- 08/11/15 Club Tucuman de Quilmes (2015; Discos Del Sembrador)
- Verano Permanente DVD (2018; Discos Del Sembrador)

EPs

- Tómalo con Calma (2003; Lee-Chi)
- Cañaveral (2005; Discos Del Sembrador)

Singles

- "Cosas por Hacer / Danilo" (2021; Discos Del Sembrador)
- "Despedida / Laguna Larga" (2021; Discos Del Sembrador)

Splits

- Juggling Jugulars / Divide And Conquer / Lee Majors / Eterna Inocencia (1997; Sanjam)
- Un Split Amigo 7" with Wisper (1997; Sniffing)
- Boda / Eterna Inocencia (2000; Sanjam, Shark Attack, Les Nains Aussi)

Compilation albums

- Lados B (2002; Discos Del Sembrador)
- Backflip/Un Salto Mortal Para Atrás (2002; Chumpire)
