= Peggy J. Kleinplatz =

21st-century Canadian clinical professor, psychologist, and sexologist

Academic background
- Education: University of Ottawa
- Thesis: The impact of gender-role identity, conformity and choice on women's self-esteem, lifestyle satisfaction and conflict (1987)
- Doctoral advisor: Michael McCarrey

Academic work
- Discipline: Psychology
- Sub-discipline: Sexology
- Institutions: University of Ottawa; Carleton University
- Notable works: New Directions in Sex Therapy: Innovations and Alternatives

Peggy Joy Kleinplatz is a Canadian clinical psychologist and sexologist whose work often concerns optimal sexuality, opposition to the medicalization of human sexuality, and outreach to marginalized groups. She is a full professor of medicine and clinical professor of psychology at the University of Ottawa.

== Education ==
Peggy Joy Kleinplatz graduated from the University of Ottawa with a B.A. (Honours) in Psychology in 1981 and Ph.D. in 1987. Her dissertation was titled The impact of gender-role identity, conformity and choice on women's self-esteem, lifestyle satisfaction and conflict. Kleinplatz's doctoral advisor was Michael McCarrey.

== Career ==
Kleinplatz is a certified clinical psychologist and sex therapist who has taught human sexuality for over 20 years at the University of Ottawa. She is a full professor in the Department of Medicine, a clinical professor of psychology at the University of Ottawa, with cross-appointments in the Faculty of Education and School of Epidemiology and Public Health. She is also Adjunct Research Professor at Carleton University. Kleinplatz has held the Chair of Ethics and the Chair of Certifications for the American Association of Sexuality Educators, Counsellors and Therapists (AASECT).

Kleinplatz and physician Charles Allen Moser argue that paraphilias should be removed from the Diagnostic and Statistical Manual of Mental Disorders (DSM). Kleinplatz wrote, "[T]he DSM criteria for diagnosis of unusual sexual interests as pathological rests on a series of unproven and more importantly, untested assumptions." Therapists who focus on "functional" versus "dysfunctional" sex, have an approach, she writes that "is, at best, limiting and constraining and, at worst, dehumanising and risks exacerbating rather than alleviating suffering." Kleinplatz criticized sex therapy as being "too performance oriented," and not focusing enough on desire. Her work has been to focus more on ways that partners can please one another by learning to listen to what their partners want. Kleinplatz has shown that "great sex flourishes in relationships that deepen with maturity," according to the Globe and Mail. She has also criticized the concepts premenstrual dysphoric disorder and dyspareunia as medicalizing women's bodies.

Her book, New Directions in Sex Therapy: Innovations and Alternatives (2001), was considered by the Journal of Sex & Marital Therapy to be an important challenge to current models of sex therapy. The book is also a feminist critique of sex therapy and describes modern issues facing the practice. The second edition, updated and expanded, came out in 2012 with a 3rd edition is forthcoming from Routledge in September 2024. New Directions in Sex Therapy (2nd edition) was a co-winner for an AASECT award in 2013. Her book, Sadomasochism:Powerful Pleasures (2006), examines fifteen in-depth cases of different types of couples who practices sadomasochism.

== Awards and honors ==
Kleinplatz was awarded the Prix d'Excellence at the University of Ottawa in 2000. In 2015, she was awarded the Professional Standard of Excellence Award from the American Association of Sexuality Educators, Counselors and Therapists (AASECT) for her contributions to the field.

== Selected works ==
=== Books ===
- Kleinplatz, Peggy J. (2001). New Directions in Sex Therapy: Innovations and Alternatives. Psychology Press. ISBN 9780876309674.
- Kleinplatz, Peggy J.; Moser, Charles (2006). Sadomasochism: Powerful Pleasures. Psychology Press. ISBN 9781560236405.
- Bouman, Walter Pierre; Kleinplatz, Peggy J. (2015). Sexuality and Ageing. Routledge. ISBN 9781138932630.
- Kleinplatz, Peggy J. (2019). Experimental Approach to Sexuality. Routledge. ISBN 978-1138821798.
- Kleinplatz, Peggy J.; Ménard, A. Dana (2020). Magnificent Sex: Lessons from Extraordinary Lovers. Routledge. ISBN 9780367181369.
