= Salvador Sánchez vs. Juan Laporte =

Boxing competition

- Date: December 13, 1980
- Venue: El Paso County Coliseum, El Paso, Texas, U.S.
- Title(s) on the line: WBC Featherweight Championship

Tale of the tape
Boxer	(Mexico) Salvador Sánchez	(Puerto Rico) Juan Laporte
Nickname	"Chava"	
Hometown	Santiago Tianguistenco, Edomex, Mexico	Guayama, Guayama, Puerto Rico
Pre-fight record	37–1–1 (29 KO)	15–1 (8 KO)
Age	21 years, 10 months	21 years
Height	5 ft 6 in (168 cm)	5 ft 5 in (165 cm)
Weight	126 lb (57 kg)	124 1/2 lb (56 kg)
Style	Orthodox	Orthodox
Recognition	WBC; Featherweight Champion	

Result
- Sánchez defeated Laporte by 15th round unanimous decision

Salvador Sánchez vs. Juan Laporte was a professional boxing match contested on December 13, 1980, for the WBC featherweight championship.

== Background ==
Salvador Sánchez had a record of 37 wins, 1 loss and one draw, with 29 knockouts. He had won the WBC world Featherweight championship by defeating Danny Lopez by a thirteenth-round knockout on February 2 of that year. He followed that win with defenses against Ruben Castillo, Lopez in a rematch and Patrick Ford. Despite the fact that Sanchez was a world champion, he had reached celebrity status only in his native Mexico and among hardcore boxing fans. It was when Sanchez beat Wilfredo Gómez that it can be said Sanchez gained full celebrity status.

On the other hand, Laporte was even lesser known than Sanchez, as even many among his fellow Puerto Ricans did not know him. He was known more than anywhere else in the New York City area, having fought at the Madison Square Garden often during the early parts of his career. He sported a record of 15 wins and 1 loss, with 8 wins by knockout, coming into his bout with Sanchez.

== The fight ==
Laporte was a mandatory challenger, meaning that Sanchez had to defend his WBC title against him or he could be stripped of the world championship. Don King, Sanchez's promoter, figuring that the fight would sell more tickets in a state near Mexico, worked a deal for the fight to take place in El Paso. A decisively pro-Sanchez crowd filled the County Coliseum the night of the fight. The event was televised live on ABC.

Laporte, the underdog, pressed Sanchez into a torrid pace since early on in the bout. Sanchez was knocked down only once in his career; Laporte only once also in over 50 fights. The two boxers traded punches toe to toe for most of the encounter, but Sanchez utilized his experience to his advantage. The less experienced Laporte, however, kept firing back at Sanchez, connecting with multiple hard shots that bounced off Sanchez's head and chin.

By the latter rounds, Sanchez's expertise was becoming more evident, as he repeatedly shook Laporte with blows to the head. Laporte, however, hung in and kept trying to overtake the champion. Much to the delight of the crowd, Laporte did not refuse to trade punches with the champion until the bell rang to end round fifteen, signifying the end of the bout. Fans gave both fighters a standing ovation after the bout was over.

Sanchez retained the title by unanimous decision, with scores of 148-142 (8-2-5 in rounds), 146-139 (11-4) and 147-140 (10-3-2).

== Aftermath ==
Sanchez was so impressed by his foe's performance that he went over to Laporte's dressing room and told Laporte that he would be the next great world Featherweight champion.

Laporte and Sanchez forged a friendship that lasted for the rest of Sanchez's life after the bout.

On August 21, 1981, Sanchez finally reached cross-over celebrity when he knocked out Gómez, as aforementioned, in eight rounds at Las Vegas, Nevada.

After having defeated Azumah Nelson to retain his title, Sanchez reportedly signed a contract to fight Laporte in a rematch, and he went to training soon after.

Sanchez's words to Laporte after their fight would tragically become prophetic when Sanchez was killed in a car accident on August 12 of 1982, and, on September 15, Laporte captured the vacant WBC world Featherweight title by knocking out Mario Miranda in ten rounds at the Madison Square Garden.

== Undercard ==
Confirmed bouts:

Preceded by vs. Patrick Ford	Salvador Sánchez's bouts 13 December 1980	Succeeded by vs. Roberto Castañón
Preceded by vs. Mano Morua	Juan Laporte's bouts 13 December 1980	Succeeded by vs. Roberto Bido
