= Enrique Solis =

Puerto Rican boxer (boxed 1972–1983)

Jose Enrique "Quique" Solis De Jesus born on January 29, 1958 in Caimito, Rio Piedras, Puerto Rico is a former boxer from Puerto Rico, who in 1978 challenged Eusebio Pedroza of Panama for Pedroza's WBA's recognized world Featherweight championship. Solis is a member of a prolific Puerto Rican boxing family, his brothers being former WBA and Ring Magazine world Bantamweight champion Julian Solís, former WBC world Junior Lightweight title challenger Rafael Solis and Santos Solis, who once fought Wilfred Benítez as a professional and went ten rounds with him.

== Professional boxing career ==
Quique Solis, the son of Jose Julian Solis and Gloria De Jesus, made his professional boxing debut on February 19, 1972 at the Hiram Bithorn Stadium in San Juan, defeating the also debuting Samuel Feliciano by first-round knockout. He followed that initial victory with an April 15 points win over Lecardo Millan, another debuting fighter.

On May 13, Solis tasted defeat as a professional for the first time, when facing debutant Santiago Rosas, who outpointed him over four rounds at San Juan. A rematch with Rosas was held in Ponce on July 8, and Solis was knocked out in round four.

Solis took off almost a year after the second loss to Rosas but re-emerged in the last seven months of 1973 fighting five times during that span, going 3-1-1 in those bouts, defeating 1-5 Gilberto Mendez on May 12 by a fourth-round knockout at the Country Club Stadium in Carolina, debuting Rolando Martinez by six-round decision at Isabela on July 14, and 8-2 Enrique Alonso by a ten-round decision November 30 at San Juan. He lost to 3-5-1 Tony Tris by split eight-round decision on August 21 in San Juan, and drew (tied) with Adriano Marrero, who'd later challenge Antonio Cervantes for the Colombian's WBA world Junior Welterweight title, over eight rounds at San Juan on October 24.

Solis' two 1974 bouts were significant because they were against Benjamin Ortiz, another Puerto Rican and who also fought multiple world class fighters. For their first bout, Ortiz came in with a 13-7 record. On March 3, Solis outpointed Ortiz over six rounds in San Juan, but on their rematch, June 26, Ortiz, by then 14-9, avenged that loss by a ten-round decision at the Roberto Clemente Coliseum also in San Juan.

Kiko Solis' 1975 professional boxing campaign included four bouts, in which he went 1-2-1 with one knockout. On April 12, he dropped a ten-round decision in San Juan to 14-4-2 local prospect Santos Luis Rivera; on July 28, he beat the mismatched Benito Estrella, 0-5-1, by knockout in round eight at the Roberto Clemente Coliseum; on September 20 he made his first fight abroad when losing by knockout in eight rounds to undefeated, 9-0 Oscar Arnal at the Nuevo Circo in Caracas, Venezuela and on November 17, he drew over ten rounds with 8-14 Andres Torres in San Juan.

Solis had four bouts in 1976, each against the same opponent: he and trial horse Francisco Cruz met on January 3, January 18, April 5 and June 5, each time at San Juan. Cruz was 5-10 before their first match, 5-11 before their second, 5-12 before their third and 5-14 before their fourth. Each time Solis won by ten-round decisions. Solis only had two bouts in 1977, but they were important ones: on July 11, he outpointed 28-1, world ranked Hector Medina over ten rounds at San Juan. This win propelled him to a top-ten ranking among the Featherweights by the WBA.

The win against Medina allowed Solis to have a chance at fighting former WBA world Featherweight champion Alexis Arguello, who'd later add two more world titles and be inducted into the International Boxing Hall of Fame. Arguello was by this time attempting to win a world Junior Lightweight title and was 51-4 coming into their fight. Solis went up in weight to the Junior Lightweight division for this bout, held at Somoza Stadium in Managua, Nicaragua on December 18. Solis was dropped twice in round five, the fight being stopped shortly thereafter.

On January 28, 1978, as part of the Arguello-Alfredo Escalera I's undercard, Solis faced Panamanian Diego Alcala, 27-10-2, with view of facing the Arguello-Escalera bout's winner for the WBC world Junior Lightweight title, in a fight held at Bayamon, Puerto Rico. Alcala, however, outpointed Solis over ten rounds. Solis then returned to the Featherweight division, where he had a pair of points wins over two debutant fighters, Frank Morales in eight rounds on February 14 at San Juan, and Frank Moncada over ten rounds on August 26 at Carolina. After this, Solis was given his world title chance.

=== World title fight ===
On November 27, 1978, Solis found himself challenging Eusebio Pedroza, a world-traveling World Boxing Association's Featherweight champion of the world, in a 15-round bout for the Panamanian's world championship at the Roberto Clemente Coliseum in San Juan. Solis gave a good account of himself against the 19-3 Pedroza, winning a few rounds on each of the three judges' scorecards, but he still lost a unanimous, albeit relatively close, decision after 15 rounds by the scores of 147-144, 148-141 and 147-145, all in favor of Pedroza, who'd later join Arguello in the International Boxing Hall of Fame as a member.

=== Rest of career ===
Solis followed his title try with three more losses, to form a four fight losing streak. Among them, he lost to 22-9-2 Abdul Bey on June 12, 1979 at the Blaisdell Center in Honolulu, Hawaii-his first fight in the United States-an October 19 loss to 10-0 Patrick Ford for the Fecarbox regional Featherweight title at Georgetown, Guyana by ten-round decision, and a ten-round split decision defeat to 21-2 Mike Ayala at the Madison Square Garden's Felt Forum in New York, New York on November 23 (in 1986 his brother Julian would also lose a ten-round split decision to Ayala).

Enrique Solis returned his name to the winning column on his next fight, when he faced Felix Trinidad Sr. on December 18 in San Juan, knocking out the former Puerto Rican national Featherweight titlist in round nine.

Solis took 1980 off but returned in 1981 to defeat 9-7-3 Heriberto Olivares by a ten-round decision in San Juan, after which he was granted a shot at the USBA's Super Featherweight title against the undefeated, 17-0 John Verderosa. The Verderosa-Solis bout took place on June 4, 1981, also at the Felt Forum in New York. Solis lost a twelve-round unanimous decision and decided to retire afterwards.

He returned for one fight in 1983, losing to 12-2-1 Margarito Marquez on January 14 by fourth-round knockout at Chicago, Illinois. This was Solis' last fight as a professional boxer.

Solis had a record of 16 wins, 14 losses and two draws (ties), with 4 knockout wins.
