= Felix Trinidad Sr. =

Puerto Rican boxer, fought 1975 to 1981, boxing trainer

Felix Trinidad Sr. is a Puerto Rican former professional boxer and prominent boxing trainer. Mostly remembered for training his son, International Boxing Hall of Fame member Félix Trinidad, Felix Trinidad Sr. nevertheless was a Featherweight boxer during the middle and late 1970s and the early 1980s, who fought the likes of Salvador Sanchez and Enrique Solis.

== Boxing career ==
Trinidad Sr. began his professional boxer career by taking on 9-1 Nick Ortiz on March 31, 1975, in San Juan, losing by sixth-round knockout. Three weeks later, he got his first professional boxing win when he defeated a debutant, Francisco Sullivan, by a second-round knockout, also in San Juan.

Trinidad Sr. lost two of his next three bouts and took time off boxing from 1976 to 1978, when he returned on January 14 with a victory over 1-2 Fernando Rivera by six rounds decision at Carolina, Puerto Rico. Trinidad Sr. followed that win with three more victories and then he was given a chance at winning the vacant Puerto Rican national featherweight title on November 27 of the same year-1978-as part of the undercard in which Solis lost to Eusebio Pedroza at the Roberto Clemente Coliseum in San Juan for Pedroza's WBA world Featherweight title. His rival that night, the same Fernando Rivera that Trinidad Sr. had previously defeated, was by now 4–3 in seven bouts. Trinidad Sr. won the Puerto Rican national Featherweight title by outpointing Rivera again, this time over twelve rounds.

Next, Trinidad Sr. had his first fight abroad, against up-and-comer, future WBC world Featherweight champion and International Boxing Hall of Fame member, 31-1-1 Salvador Sanchez. This bout took place on August 7, 1979, at The Summit in Houston, Texas, United States, and Trinidad Sr. lasted until the fifth round, when he was stopped by the young Mexican. A loss to Enrique Solis on December 18 by ninth-round knockout followed, then two more losses, one to future world title challenger, 14-1 Carlos Pinango by a knockout in round eight at Caracas, Venezuela on August 18, 1980, before Trinidad Sr. posted what would turn out to be his last win as a professional boxer, beating 7-2 Fernando Ortiz on January 29, 1981. On February 19, 1981, Trinidad Sr. tried to regain his by now vacant national Featherweight championship against debuting Dagoberto Agosto. In what would turn out to be his last fight, he lost to Agosto by a twelve-round decision.

Trinidad Sr. retired with a record of 8 wins and 8 losses in 16 professional boxing bouts, 5 wins coming by way of knockout.

During at least part of his career as a boxer, Trinidad Sr. sparred in a ring with another member of the International Boxing Hall of Fame, Wilfred Benítez.

== Training career ==
Early in 1990, Trinidad Sr. announced that his son, Félix Trinidad Jr., would begin a professional boxing career of his own instead of waiting for the 1992 Summer Olympics due to a dispute with the local amateur boxing authority. He was severely criticized by some on the national press, but the Trinidads went on with their plans.

In 1993, Félix Trinidad Jr. became Trinidad Sr's first world boxing champion when he knocked out Maurice Blocker in two rounds to win the IBF's world Welterweight title. Eight years later, Trinidad Sr. led Nelson Dieppa to a world championship also. In addition to those two boxers, he also trained his nephew, Juan Gomez Trinidad, Fres Oquendo and Felix Flores.

Trinidad Sr. also acted as his son's manager. In 2000, he won the Al Buck Award as the Boxing Writers Association of America's "manager of the year".

=== Hand-wraps controversy ===
Before his son's fight with Bernard Hopkins on September 29, 2001, Trinidad Sr. wrapped his hands in order to put boxing gloves on them. Hopkins' trainer Nazim Richardson argued that the hand-wrapping technique used by Trinidad Sr. was illegal in New York City, the place where the fight took place. Richardson and Hopkins refused to get into the ring until Trinidad Jr's hands were re-wrapped. This in turn led to a large amount of rumors about Trinidad Sr. In the end, however, it was clarified that Trinidad Sr. was not giving his son an unfair advantage, and Trinidad Sr. and his son were allowed to compete in New York again.

== Professional boxing record ==
16 fights	8 wins	8 losses
By knockout	5	4
By decision	3	4

No.	Result	Record	Opponent	Type	Round, time	Date	Location	Notes
16	Loss	8–8	(Puerto Rico) Dagoberto Agosto	PTS	12	Feb 19, 1981	Trujillo Alto Puerto Rico	For vacant Puerto Rican featherweight title
15	Win	8–7	(Puerto Rico) Fernando Ortiz	PTS	10	Jan 29, 1981	Trujillo Alto Puerto Rico	
14	Loss	7–7	(Venezuela) Carlos Piñango	KO	8 (8),	Aug 18, 1980	(Venezuela) Caracas	
13	Loss	7–6	(Puerto Rico) Jose Luis Alejandro	PTS	10	May 19, 1980	San Juan, Puerto Rico	
12	Loss	7–5	(Puerto Rico) Enrique Solis	TKO	9 (10),	Dec 18, 1979	(Puerto Rico) Stadium Rio Piedras	
11	Loss	7–4	(Mexico) Salvador Sanchez	TKO	5 (10)	Aug 7, 1979	(United States) Summit Houston Texas U.S.	
10	Win	7–3	(Puerto Rico) Fernando Rivera	PTS	12	Nov 11, 1978	Colesium Roberto Clememnte San Juan Puerto Rico	Won vacant Puerto Rican Featherweight title
9	Win	6–3	(Puerto Rico) Maelo Santana	KO	4 (10)	Sep 18, 1978	Rio Piedras Puerto Rico	
8	Win	5–3	(Puerto Rico) Ruben Adordo	KO	1 (8)	May 20, 1978	Country Club Stadium, Carolina Puerto Rico	
7	Win	4–3	(United States) Manny Quiles	TKO	4 (6)	Apr 22, 1978	Coliseo Roberto Clemente, San Juan Puerto Rico	
6	Win	3–3	(United States) Fernando Rivera	PTS	6	Jan 14, 1978	Carolina Puerto Rico	
5	Loss	2–3	(Puerto Rico) Jose Antonio Rosa	KO	2 (6) 2:21	May 31, 1976	Coliseo Roberto Clemente San Juan Puerto Rico	
4	Win	2–2	(Puerto Rico) Frankie Aponto	KO	4 (6)	Nov 6, 1975	San Juan Puerto Rico	
3	Loss	1–2	(Puerto Rico) Carlos Rodriguez	PTS	6	Nov 3, 1975	Roberto Clemente Colesium, San Jaun Puerto Rico	
2	Win	1–1	(Puerto Rico) Francisco Sullivan	KO	2 (6),	Apr 26, 1975	San Juan, Puerto Rico	
1	Loss	0–1	(Puerto Rico) Nick Ortiz	KO	6 (6),	Mar 31, 1975	San Juan, Puerto Rico	

== Other ==
In July 2012, during a radio interview at a station named Z-93, Trinidad Sr. slapped show host Rony Campos, known as "Rony The Hyper" on his face. This was part of a challenge by Hyper to Trinidad Sr. himself and was done in jest.

During 2012, Trinidad, Sr. along with his son and others like former baseball player Juan González and sportscaster Rafael Bracero, was inducted into the Puerto Rico Sports Hall of Fame.

On April 10, 2014, both Félix Trinidad Jr. and his father asked their debtors to stop seeking payments of some debts due to Trinidad Jr. losing most of the money earned in his professional boxing career to some investments on local government bonds made for him by former Trinidad Jr. financial advisor Jose Ramos.

Some weeks later, when Trinidad Jr. was inducted into the International Boxing Hall of Fame, he dedicated the induction to his father Trinidad Sr.

In 2022, Trinidad Sr. and his son were both inducted into the Indiana Boxing Hall of Fame.

On February 13, 2023, the Trinidad's reached a confidential agreement to solve their problems with their debtors, including Banco Popular de Puerto Rico, without going to court.
