= Julian Solís =

Puerto Rican boxer (born 1957)

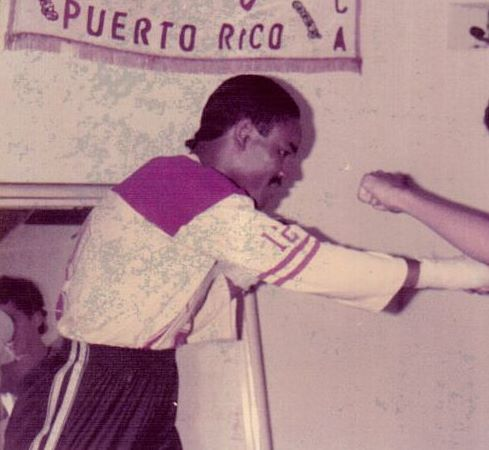

Personal information
- Born: Julián Solís de Jesús; January 7, 1957 (age 69) Río Piedras, Puerto Rico
- Height: 5 ft 5 in (165 cm)
- Weight: Bantamweight; Super bantamweight

Boxing career
- Stance: Orthodox

Boxing record
- Total fights: 55
- Wins: 41
- Win by KO: 22
- Losses: 13
- Draws: 1

Julian Solís De Jesus (born 7 January 1957) is a former boxer from Puerto Rico. He was born in the San Juan area of Río Piedras, but because of the closeness of his birthplace to Caguas, he often trained at the Bairoa Gym in Caguas. His training base, however, was the Caimito Gym.

A former Lineal and WBA Bantamweight champion, Solis is the only world champion in a family that produced two other world-class boxers: brother Enrique was outpointed by WBA Featherweight champion Eusebio Pedroza in 1978, and brother Rafael was knocked out in five rounds by WBC Super featherweight champion Héctor Camacho in 1983.

== Professional boxing career ==
The son of Jose Julian Solis and of Gloria De Jesus, Solis began his professional boxing career in 1975, outpointing Ray Negron in four on 11 November. He won his first five fights in Puerto Rico, and then had his first international fight in December 1975, when he beat Juan Gómez in St. Maarten by a knockout in round two. On 12 February 1978, he met fringe contender Nivio Nolasco, outpointing him over ten rounds, and travelled to the Dominican Republic, where on 15 March he outpointed Leopoldo Frias also in ten rounds. With a record of 12-0 and 5 knockouts, he returned to the Dominican Republic, where he challenged Julio Soto Solano on 16 October for the "Latin American Bantamweight title", winning the regional belt by outpointing Solano over 12 rounds.

== World bantamweight championship ==
In 1979, he won four fights, including one over Julio C. Saba knocked out in eight rounds in Buenos Aires. Solis continued on his travels in 1980. He retained the Latin American title with a 12th-round knockout of future world title challenger Edgar Roman in Venezuela, won a fight in South Africa, and challenged the Lineal and WBA Bantamweight champion Jorge Lujan in Miami on 29 August, winning on points.

For his first defense, Solis returned to Miami, but he lost the belt and his undefeated record to Jeff Chandler on November 14 when he was knocked out in the fourteenth round. After beginning 1981 with a win, he met Chandler again on 25 July, at Atlantic City, New Jersey. This time Chandler did the job in half the time, knocking out Solis in the seventh round. His next fight, with Kiko Bejines (later to die in a boxing related accident) in Los Angeles, also resulted in a seventh-round knockout defeat.

Solis started 1982 by winning two fights in San Juan and another one in Chile. By 1983, he was a popular performer in televised fights, often held in small Puerto Rican cities. He won four fights in Puerto Rico that year, and drew in Panama with the Number One ranked super bantamweight, Bernardo Checa. In 1984, he won three fights, including a ten-round decision over future world champion Kenny Mitchell on the 8 December undercard of the Azumah Nelson - Wilfredo Gómez WBC Featherweight championship bout in San Juan. In 1985, Solis fought only once, outpointing David Campo. He began 1986 by losing on points to Mike Ayala over ten rounds on 2 March in San Antonio. Solis and his handlers felt he had been robbed of a victory by the judges in this fight, feeling that Solis had done enough to win. They filed a complaint with the Texas state athletic commission, but in vain, as the officials reviewed a tape of the fight and decided the result should stand.

Solis fought on from this point, but he only won six of his last fifteen bouts before retiring in 1992. True to his globe-trotting style, only two of those bouts were in Puerto Rico, and he visited Italy, South Korea, South Africa once again, Miami and various American states. Among the boxers he faced during the last part of his career were future world Bantamweight champion Maurizio Stecca, former world Bantamweight champion Calvin Grove, Seung-Hoon Lee and Pedro Decima.

Solis retired with a record of 41 wins, 13 losses and 1 draw, with 22 knockouts. He remains active as a public figure in Puerto Rico, participating in charity exhibitions here and there.

== Professional boxing record ==
| 55 fights | 41 wins | 13 losses |
|---|---|---|
| By knockout | 22 | 5 |
| By decision | 19 | 7 |
| By disqualification | 0 | 1 |
| Draws | 1 | |

| No. | Result | Record | Opponent | Type | Round, time | Date | Location | Notes |
|---|---|---|---|---|---|---|---|---|
| 55 | Loss | 41–13–1 | Stéphane Haccoun | RTD | 5 (10) | 1992-12-15 | Ozoir-la-Ferrière, France | |
| 54 | Loss | 41–12–1 | Tony Green | UD | 10 (10) | 1992-06-16 | The Blue Horizon, Philadelphia, Pennsylvania, U.S. | |
| 53 | Win | 41–11–1 | Jeff Roberts | KO | 3 (10) | 1991-06-26 | The Blue Horizon, Philadelphia, Pennsylvania, U.S. | |
| 52 | Loss | 40–11–1 | Calvin Grove | UD | 10 (10) | 1991-01-08 | The Blue Horizon, Philadelphia, Pennsylvania, U.S. | |
| 51 | Win | 40–10–1 | Mike Cruz | KO | 2 (10) | 1990-04-10 | Mahi Temple Shrine Auditorium, Miami, Florida, U.S. | |
| 50 | Win | 39–10–1 | Anthony Boyle | RTD | 6 (10) | 1990-01-04 | The Blue Horizon, Philadelphia, Pennsylvania, U.S. | |
| 49 | Loss | 38–10–1 | Simon Skosana | UD | 10 (10) | 1989-04-30 | Indoor Centre, Springs, South Africa | |
| 48 | Loss | 38–9–1 | Pedro Rubén Décima | UD | 10 (10) | 1989-01-17 | Caesars Palace, Paradise, Nevada, U.S. | |
| 47 | Loss | 38–8–1 | Jesus Poll | UD | 12 (12) | 1988-10-14 | Caesars Palace, Paradise, Nevada, U.S. | For NABF super-bantamweight title |
| 46 | Win | 38–7–1 | Tony Williams | UD | 8 (8) | 1988-05-30 | Marriott Hotel, Trumbull, Connecticut, U.S. | |
| 45 | Loss | 37–7–1 | Lee Seung-hoon | PTS | 10 (10) | 1988-03-20 | Jongha Gymnasium, Ulsan, South Korea | |
| 44 | Loss | 37–6–1 | Maurizio Stecca | DQ | 6 (?) | 1987-12-11 | Livorno, Italy | |
| 43 | Win | 37–5–1 | Victor Baez | PTS | 10 (10) | 1987-07-30 | Isla Verde, Puerto Rico | |
| 42 | Loss | 36–5–1 | Joe Ruelaz | KO | 3 (10) | 1987-04-09 | The Forum, Inglewood, California, U.S. | |
| 41 | Win | 36–4–1 | Larry Highsmith | KO | 3 (?) | 1987-02-21 | El San Juan Hotel & Casino, San Juan, Puerto Rico | |
| 40 | Win | 35–4–1 | Franklin Salas | KO | 6 (?) | 1986-11-28 | Holiday Beach Hotel, Willemstad, Curaçao | |
| 39 | Loss | 34–4–1 | Mike Ayala | MD | 10 (10) | 1986-03-02 | HemisFair Arena, San Antonio, Texas, U.S. | |
| 38 | Win | 34–3–1 | David Capo | UD | 10 (10) | 1985-05-19 | Roberto Clemente Coliseum, San Juan, Puerto Rico | |
| 37 | Win | 33–3–1 | Kenny Mitchell | UD | 10 (10) | 1984-12-08 | Hiram Bithorn Stadium, San Juan, Puerto Rico | |
| 36 | Win | 32–3–1 | Manuel Batista | PTS | 10 (10) | 1984-09-06 | Coliseo Pedrín Zorrilla, Hato Rey, Puerto Rico | |
| 35 | Win | 31–3–1 | Terry Kemp | KO | 2 (10) | 1984-07-21 | Coliseo Salvador Dijols, Ponce, Puerto Rico | |
| 34 | Win | 30–3–1 | Jorge Ortiz | KO | 4 (?) | 1984-02-18 | Trujillo Alto, Puerto Rico | |
| 33 | Win | 29–3–1 | Julio Guerrero | KO | 5 (?) | 1983-12-14 | Roberto Clemente Coliseum, San Juan, Puerto Rico | |
| 32 | Win | 28–3–1 | Manuel Santos | PTS | 10 (10) | 1983-10-27 | Trujillo Alto, Puerto Rico | |
| 31 | Draw | 27–3–1 | Bernardo Checa | SD | 12 (12) | 1983-08-13 | Gimnasio Nuevo Panama, Panama City, Panama | For vacant WBA Fedelatin super-bantamweight title |
| 30 | Win | 27–3 | Ruben Dario Herasme | KO | 4 (?) | 1983-04-23 | Auditorio Juan Pachín Vicéns, Ponce, Puerto Rico | |
| 29 | Win | 26–3 | Epifanio Melendez | KO | 4 (?) | 1983-02-12 | Carlos Miguel Mangual Coliseum, Canóvanas, Puerto Rico | |
| 28 | Win | 25–3 | Heriberto Olivares | PTS | 10 (10) | 1982-08-18 | Hiram Bithorn Stadium, San Juan, Puerto Rico | |
| 27 | Win | 24–3 | Jorge Araya | KO | 4 (12) | 1982-03-29 | Santiago, Chile | Won vacant WBC Continental Americas super-bantamweight title |
| 26 | Win | 23–3 | Ismael Santana | TKO | 7 (?) | 1982-02-20 | Roberto Clemente Coliseum, San Juan, Puerto Rico | |
| 25 | Loss | 22–3 | Francisco Bejines | TKO | 7 (10) | 1981-11-12 | Grand Olympic Auditorium, Los Angeles, California, U.S. | |
| 24 | Loss | 22–2 | Jeff Chandler | KO | 7 (15) | 1981-07-25 | Resorts Casino Hotel, Atlantic City, New Jersey, U.S. | For WBA & The Ring bantamweight titles |
| 23 | Win | 22–1 | Humberto Rodriguez | KO | 8 (?) | 1981-05-22 | El San Juan Hotel & Casino, San Juan, Puerto Rico | |
| 22 | Loss | 21–1 | Jeff Chandler | TKO | 14 (15) | 1980-11-14 | Jai Alai Fronton, Miami, Florida, U.S. | Lost WBA & The Ring bantamweight titles |
| 21 | Win | 21–0 | Jorge Luján | SD | 15 (15) | 1980-08-29 | Auditorium, Miami Beach, Florida, U.S. | Won WBA & The Ring bantamweight titles |
| 20 | Win | 20–0 | Welile Nkosinkulu | SD | 10 (10) | 1980-05-31 | Mdantsane Stadium, Mdantsane, South Africa | |
| 19 | Win | 19–0 | Edgar Roman | TKO | 12 (12) | 1980-02-02 | Nuevo Circo, Caracas, Venezuela | Retained WBC FECARBOX bantamweight title |
| 18 | Win | 18–0 | Juan Ramirez | KO | 2 (10) | 1979-12-18 | Stadium, Río Piedras, Puerto Rico | |
| 17 | Win | 17–0 | Bobby Flores | KO | 1 (10) | 1979-09-25 | Auditorium, Miami Beach, Florida, U.S. | |
| 16 | Win | 16–0 | Julio Cesar Saba | RTD | 8 (10) | 1979-06-02 | Estadio Chateau Carreras, Córdoba, Argentina | |
| 15 | Win | 15–0 | Guillermo Almengot | PTS | 10 (10) | 1979-03-25 | Hiram Bithorn Stadium, San Juan, Puerto Rico | |
| 14 | Win | 14–0 | Gilberto Illueca | PTS | 10 (10) | 1978-11-27 | Roberto Clemente Coliseum, San Juan, Puerto Rico | |
| 13 | Win | 13–0 | Julio Soto Solano | PTS | 12 (12) | 1978-10-16 | Santo Domingo, Dominican Republic | Retained WBC FECARBOX bantamweight title |
| 12 | Win | 12–0 | Jaime Ricardo | KO | 8 (12) | 1978-08-28 | Roberto Clemente Coliseum, San Juan, Puerto Rico | Won vacant WBC FECARBOX bantamweight title |
| 11 | Win | 11–0 | Jose Jimenez | KO | 2 (?) | 1978-06-10 | Estadio Country Club, San Juan, Puerto Rico | |
| 10 | Win | 10–0 | Leopoldo Frias | PTS | 10 (10) | 1978-03-15 | Estadio Olimpico, Santo Domingo, Dominican Republic | |
| 9 | Win | 9–0 | Livio Nolasco | PTS | 10 (10) | 1978-02-12 | Estadio Country Club, San Juan, Puerto Rico | |
| 8 | Win | 8–0 | Felix Villetta | KO | 6 (10) | 1977-12-03 | Hiram Bithorn Stadium, San Juan, Puerto Rico | |
| 7 | Win | 7–0 | Luis Rosario | PTS | 10 (10) | 1977-10-08 | Estadio Country Club, San Juan, Puerto Rico | |
| 6 | Win | 6–0 | Juan Gomez | KO | 2 (?) | 1976-12-04 | Philipsburg, Sint Maarten | |
| 5 | Win | 5–0 | Jorge Cruz | KO | 4 (?) | 1976-06-04 | Cancha Country Club, Caguas, Puerto Rico | |
| 4 | Win | 4–0 | Luis Cruz | PTS | 4 (4) | 1976-04-05 | Roberto Clemente Coliseum, San Juan, Puerto Rico | |
| 3 | Win | 3–0 | Juan Rodriguez | PTS | 4 (4) | 1976-03-20 | Santa Isabel, Puerto Rico | |
| 2 | Win | 2–0 | Ruben Maldonado | PTS | 4 (4) | 1975-12-20 | Roberto Clemente Coliseum, San Juan, Puerto Rico | |
| 1 | Win | 1–0 | Ray Negron | PTS | 4 (4) | 1975-11-17 | Roberto Clemente Coliseum, San Juan, Puerto Rico | |

== Later life ==
In 2010, Solís was injured in a shooting incident.

== See also ==
- Notable boxing families
- Afro-Puerto Ricans
- Boxing in Puerto Rico
- List of Puerto Rican boxing world champions
- List of world bantamweight boxing champions

Sporting positions
Regional boxing titles
| Vacant Title last held by Jorge Madrigal | WBC FECARBOX bantamweight champion August 28, 1978 – 1980; Vacated | Vacant Title next held by Enrique Sánchez |
| Vacant Title last held by José Cervantes | WBC Continental Americas super-bantamweight champion March 29, 1982 – 1983; Vacated | Vacant Title next held by Tommy Valoy |
World boxing titles
| Preceded by Jorge Luján | WBA bantamweight champion August 29, 1980 – November 14, 1980 | Succeeded by Jeff Chandler |
| Preceded by Jorge Luján | The Ring bantamweight champion August 29, 1980 – November 14, 1980 | Succeeded by Jeff Chandler |
