= Miguel Iriarte =

Panamanian professional Boxer

Personal information
- Born: Colón, Panama
- Weight: Bantamweight

Boxing career

Boxing record
- Total fights: 24
- Wins: 13
- Win by KO: 10
- Losses: 1
- Draws: 1

Miguel Iriarte is a Panamanian former professional boxer who, on October 27, 1982, challenged American Jeff Chandler for the American's WBA's world Bantamweight championship, losing to the International Boxing Hall of Famer by a ninth-round technical knockout, at the Resorts International Hotel in Atlantic City, New Jersey, United States. The fight with Chandler was transmitted in the United States by the NBC television channel.

== Professional boxing career ==
Apart from his unsuccessful challenge of Chandler, Iriarte also fought the likes of the then future WBA world Junior-Bantamweight champion Rafael Pedroza and future WBA world Super-Bantamweight title challenger, Chile's Benito Badilla, beating Pedroza by ten rounds unanimous points decision on August 30, 1980 in Colon, but losing to Badilla in what was Iriarte's last professional boxing contest, by seventh-round technical knockout on Saturday, November 17, 1984, also in Colon.

Iriarte retired with a record of 13 wins along with 1 losses and 1 draw (tie), in veinticuatro professional boxing matches, with 13 wins and 1 losses by way of knockout.

== See also ==
- List of Panamanians
- Alfonso Lopez
- Eusebio Pedroza
- Hilario Zapata
- Jorge Lujan
- Roberto Duran
