= Patrick Ford =

Patrick Ford may refer to:

- Sir Patrick Ford, 1st Baronet (1880–1945), Scottish Unionist Party politician
- Patrick Ford (boxer) (1955–2011), Guyanese and British Commonwealth featherweight boxer
- Patrick Ford (journalist) (died 1913), Irish-American journalist and land reformer
- Patrick F. Ford Jr. or James Meredith (1872–1915), Medal of Honor recipient
- Patrick O. Ford (1942–1968), United States Navy sailor and Navy Cross recipient
- Patrick W. Ford (1847–1900), Irish-American architect

== See also ==
- Pat Ford (disambiguation)
- Patrick Forde (disambiguation)
- Ford (surname)
