= Patrick Forde =

Patrick Forde may refer to:

- Paddy Forde (1922–1972), Irish politician
- Pat Forde (active since 1987), American sports journalist
- Patrick Ford (boxer) (born Patrick Forde, 1955–2011), Guyanese boxer

== See also ==
- Patrick Ford (disambiguation)
