= Rafael Pedroza =

Panamanian boxer

Personal information
- Nickname: Rafaelito
- Born: Rafael Pedroza; March 27, 1955 (age 71) Colón, Panama
- Height: 5 ft 3 1/2 in (161 cm)
- Weight: Light flyweight; Super flyweight

Boxing career
- Stance: Orthodox

Boxing record
- Total fights: 28
- Wins: 19
- Win by KO: 15
- Losses: 8
- Draws: 1

Rafael Pedroza (born March 27, 1955) is a retired Panamanian boxer and was briefly a super-flyweight world champion in 1981.

Pedroza turned professional in 1974; he lost his first two attempts at a world title in 1977 and 1979 but became the WBA super-flyweight world champion on December 5, 1981 after his points victory against Argentine Gustavo Ballas. Pedroza was beaten in his first defense by Jiro Watanabe in what ended up being his final bout. He is a cousin of hall-of-fame boxer Eusebio Pedroza.

== Professional boxing record ==
28 fights	19 wins	8 losses
By knockout	15	1
By decision	4	7
Draws	1	

No.	Result	Record	Opponent	Type	Round, time	Date	Location	Notes
28	Loss	19–8–1	Jiro Watanabe	UD	15	Apr 8, 1982	Prefectural Gymnasium, Osaka, Japan	Lost WBA super-flyweight title
27	Win	19–7–1	Gustavo Ballas	SD	15	Dec 5, 1981	Gimnasio Nuevo Panama, Panama City, Panama	Won WBA super-flyweight title
26	Loss	18–7–1	Suk Chul Bae	SD	12	Jun 7, 1981	Munhwa Gymnasium, Seoul, South Korea	
25	Win	18–6–1	Pedro Romero	UD	12	Jan 17, 1981	Gimnasio Nuevo Panama, Panama City, Panama	
24	Loss	17–6–1	Gustavo Ballas	PTS	10	Oct 4, 1980	Estadio Luna Park, Buenos Aires, Argentina	
23	Loss	17–5–1	Miguel Iriarte	UD	10	Aug 30, 1980	Arena Panama Al Brown, Colon City, Panama	
22	Win	17–4–1	Fausto Gomez	KO	5 (10), 0:54	Aug 16, 1980	Gimnasio Nuevo Panama, Panama City, Panama	
21	Win	16–4–1	Javier Gonzalez	UD	12	Mar 1, 1980	Gimnasio Nuevo Panama, Panama City, Panama	
20	Loss	15–4–1	Martín Vargas	KO	4 (10)	Sep 8, 1979	Estadio Chile, Santiago de Chile, Chile	
19	Loss	15–3–1	Yoko Gushiken	UD	15	Jul 29, 1979	City Gymnasium, Kitakyushu, Japan	For WBA light-flyweight title
18	Win	15–2–1	Alex Guido	TKO	9 (10)	Apr 7, 1979	Gimnasio Nuevo Panama, Panama City, Panama	
17	Win	14–2–1	Eusebio Urcuyo	TKO	10 (10)	Jul 2, 1978	Gimnasio Nuevo Panama, Panama City, Panama	
16	Win	13–2–1	Dagoberto Perinan	TKO	4 (10)	Apr 15, 1978	Gimnasio Nuevo Panama, Panama City, Panama	
15	Win	12–2–1	Orlando Hernandez	RTD	9 (15)	Jan 26, 1978	Gimnasio Nacional Eddy Cortés, San Jose, Costa Rica	
14	Loss	11–2–1	Luis Ibarra	UD	10	Oct 1, 1977	Arena de Colon, Colon City, Panama	
13	Loss	11–1–1	Luis Estaba	UD	15	May 15, 1977	Nuevo Circo, Caracas, Venezuela	For WBC light-flyweight title
12	Win	11–0–1	Felipe Perez	TKO	7 (10)	Feb 5, 1977	Managua, Nicaragua	
11	Win	10–0–1	Domingo Torres	TKO	3 (10), 2:55	Nov 13, 1976	Managua, Nicaragua	
10	Draw	9–0–1	Hermogenes Prado	PTS	10	Jul 10, 1976	Managua, Nicaragua	
9	Win	9–0	Pablito Jimenez	UD	10	Jun 12, 1976	Gimnasio Nuevo Panama, Panama City, Panama	
8	Win	8–0	John Cajina	TKO	6 (10)	Feb 14, 1976	Gimnasio Nuevo Panama, Panama City, Panama	
7	Win	7–0	Orlando Quijada	KO	1 (10)	Nov 15, 1975	Gimnasio Nuevo Panama, Panama City, Panama	
6	Win	6–0	Candelario Guzman	TKO	7 (10)	Aug 23, 1975	Gimnasio Nuevo Panama, Panama City, Panama	
5	Win	5–0	Jose Ricard	KO	1 (8)	Jul 19, 1975	Gimnasio Nuevo Panama, Panama City, Panama	
4	Win	4–0	Adriano Mendez	TKO	1 (4)	Apr 26, 1975	Gimnasio Nuevo Panama, Panama City, Panama	
3	Win	3–0	Ricardo Vega	TKO	3 (4)	Feb 22, 1975	Gimnasio Nuevo Panama, Panama City, Panama	
2	Win	2–0	Luis Sotomayor	TKO	2 (4)	Jan 18, 1975	Gimnasio Nuevo Panama, Panama City, Panama	
1	Win	1–0	Ramon Montenegro	KO	3 (4), 2:55	Nov 30, 1974	Gimnasio Nuevo Panama, Panama City, Panama	

== See also ==
- List of super-flyweight boxing champions

Achievements
Preceded by Gustavo Ballas	WBA super flyweight champion December 5, 1981 – April 8, 1982	Succeeded by Jiro Watanabe
