= Carlos Piñango =

Venezuelan boxer and boxing trainer (1958–2013)

Personal information
- Nickname: El Feliz
- Born: Carlos Piñango; 1958 Venezuela
- Died: March 9, 2013 (aged 54–55)
- Weight: Featherweight

Boxing career

Boxing record
- Total fights: 43
- Wins: 35
- Win by KO: 24
- Losses: 8

Carlos Piñango (1958-March 9, 2013) was a Venezuelan noted amateur and professional boxer and boxing trainer, who once fought Eusebio Pedroza for the World Boxing Association's world featherweight title and who later on, trained several world champion boxers, both male and female ones, and who, as a trainer, traveled around the world training his boxers and instructing them during their contests.

== Amateur career ==
Piñango was inspired to become a boxer by Venezuelan Rafael Orono, a two-time World Boxing Council world Junior-Bantamweight champion. In one of his amateur contests, Piñango fought future two-division world champion and 1980 Moscow Olympic Games silver medalist Bernardo Piñango (no relation), who was making his debut as a fighter that day.

== Professional boxing career ==
Carlos Piñango made his professional boxing debut on Sunday, 28 January 1979, beating Hector Pinto by four-rounds decision in Caracas. Piñango won his first nine contests, four by knockout, setting up an encounter with the 10 wins, 8 losses and one draw Panamanian Jacinto Fuentes, who had previously drawn (tied) and lost once with future three-division world champion and International Boxing Hall of Fame member Wilfredo Gomez. Piñango-Fuentes took place on Monday, 17 December 1979 at Caracas, and Piñango won by second-round knockout.

The win over Fuentes started a five-knockout wins streak for Piñango; that streak lasted until he faced the multiple-time world title challenger, fellow Venezuelan Leonel Hernandez, who had a 47 wins, 7 losses and 1 draw record. Piñango got to this contest undefeated in 14 previous tests, with 9 of his wins by knockout. On Monday, 7 July 1980, Hernandez defeated Piñango by a ninth-round knockout. Piñango's next bout was against Puerto Rican Felix Trinidad Sr. (father of International Boxing Hall of Fame member and multiple-time world champion Felix Trinidad) who had 7 wins and 6 losses in 13 bouts. On Monday, 18 August 1980, Piñango beat Trinidad by eighth-round knockout in Caracas. The victory against Trinidad Sr. set another knockout win streak, which this time reached seven in a row. With the exception of a contest against Norberto R. Ramirez, a first-round knockout that took place in Barquisimeto, all of those contests took place in Caracas.

With a record of 21 wins and 1 loss, 16 of those wins coming by knockout, Piñango was now ranked by the WBA among the featherweights, and in his next bout, he took on the WBA's world featherweight champion, Panama's Eusebio Pedroza, with Pedroza's world title on the line.

=== World championship fight ===
Piñango duly met the 30 wins, 3 losses WBA world featherweight champion, future International Boxing Hall of Fame member, Eusebio Pedroza in a 15-rounds world championship contest on Saturday, 1 August 1981, at the Poliedro de Caracas. Pedroza dominated the fight, being ahead on the judges' scorecards (by 60-55, 59-56 and 60-55 on Arlen Bynum's, Carol Polis' and Albert Tremari's cards, respectively) but Piñango was able to hang around until 1 minute and 38 seconds of round seven, when he was knocked-out by the world champion.

=== Rest of career ===
For the following eight years, Piñango held a further 19 contests, of which he won 14 and lost 5, with 8 wins by knockout. Among those bouts, there was one against American Richard Savage, which was also Piñango's second test abroad, as it took place on 8 December 1984, at Oranjestad, Aruba (his first international fight, also at Oranjestad, was a first-round knockout win versus winless, 0-4 David Lopez on the previous October 6), with Piñango being defeated by Savage by a ten-rounds unanimous decision.

The very next contest for Piñango came on 23 March 1985 against Danilo Cabrera at Cabrera's home-country of the Dominican Republic. That day, at the Concorde Hotel in Santo Domingo, Piñango received his second loss in a row, when beaten by the future three-times world titles challenger by a seventh-round knockout. Piñango won his next three contests, including two held in Curacao, before returning to Curacao for a third encounter there, this time against Tommy Valoy, who had already once before fought for a WBA world title. On Friday, 31 March 1989, the 23 wins and 3 losses Valoy beat Piñango by a second-round knockout at the Holiday Beach Hotel in Willemstad.

Piñango's last professional boxing contest took place on Monday, 18 December 1989, against future IBF world featherweight championship challenger, fellow Venezuelan Ramon Guzman, who was 9-0 coming into their contest, which was held in Venezuela. Guzman beat Piñango by a first-round knockout, Piñango retiring soon after. He never fought again as a professional boxer, concentrating on becoming a successful boxing trainer instead.

== Professional boxing record ==
Piñango had 43 professional boxing contests, including one that was for the WBA's world featherweight title, and he won 35 of those while losing 8, with 24 wins and 6 losses by knockout.

== Boxing training career ==
Piñango embarked on a successful career as a boxing trainer, helping many boxers become world champions and traveling to many other countries with them. Among those he trained were Alexander Muñoz (whom he accompanied to Mexico for Muñoz's world title fight against Cristian Mijares), Gilberto Serrano, Lorenzo Parra, Antonio Cermeno (whom Piñango helped beat Wilfredo Vazquez in Vazquez's home-country of Puerto Rico), Felix Machado, Yonfrez Parejo and female boxer Ogleidis Suárez. It was with Parejo that Piñango had his last international trip as a boxing trainer before he died, when he and Parejo went to Indonesia for a contest during October 2012 (the fight took place on November 2 of that year).

== Death ==
Piñango died of respiratory failure on March 9, 2013, aged 54.

== Reactions to his death ==
After it was learned of his passing, the WBA posted a message on their official website, calling Piñango a great friend of the entity. For their part, boxers Parejo and Suarez declared that “you told me you would always be in my corner. I hope you do, teacher” and that “We, the boxers who got to know him, are aware that he was a very helpful (person), but most of all, Piñango was very humble”, respectively.

== See also ==
- List of Venezuelans
