= Ruben Castillo (boxer) =

American boxer (1957–2026)

Personal information
- Nickname: Conquistador
- Born: December 19, 1957 Billings, Montana, U.S.
- Died: February 24, 2026 (aged 68) Beaumont, California, U.S.
- Height: 5 ft 8 in (174 cm)
- Weight: Lightweight; Super Featherweight; Featherweight

Boxing career
- Reach: 70 in (178 cm)
- Stance: Orthodox

Boxing record
- Total fights: 79
- Wins: 67
- Win by KO: 37
- Losses: 10
- Draws: 2

Ruben Castillo (December 19, 1957 – February 24, 2026) was an American boxer who fought in the Featherweight division. Castillo went on to fight four world championship fights against Hall of Famers Salvador Sánchez, Alexis Argüello, and Julio César Chávez, as well as with Juan Laporte.

== Early life ==
Castillo was born in Billings, Montana. He always identified himself as a Chicano. He lived most of his childhood in Bakersfield, California.

== Professional career ==
Castillo began boxing professionally on January 24, 1975, with a fourth round knockout of Frank Ahumada in Tucson. After outpointing Ahumada over six rounds in a rematch held in Phoenix, Castillo won three consecutive fights by first round knockout, including his first fight outside Arizona, when he beat Regis Rodriguez on March 31 in Philadelphia, Pennsylvania, and his Las Vegas debut, on April 16 against Juan Aguilar. On September 22, he had his first fight abroad, defeating Yuma Duran on points after six rounds in Tecate, Mexico. Castillo fought 13 times in 1975, winning each time and scoring eight knockouts.

From the beginning of his career, Castillo started to become popular among Chicanos. Part of his popularity was due to his having fought many of his early bouts in places with large Chicano and Mexican populations. On September 17, 1976, Castillo won the Arizona state Featherweight title by outpointing Ahumada after twelve rounds in their third bout, held in Phoenix. Castillo then took part in the controversial U.S. championship tournament. He won his first bout at the tournament by outpointing Kenny Weldon over eight rounds in Marion, Ohio. That fight actually took place inside a jail; professional boxing was sometimes allowed in American jails at the time, Dwight Muhammad Qawi was another well known boxer that had a professional, sanctioned bout inside a jail.

Castillo advanced to the US tournament's finals after outpointing Walter Seeley in ten rounds, April 2 of 1977 in San Antonio, Texas. But just before his championship bout took place, a scandal broke regarding Don King and his involvement in the U.S. championship tournament, and Castillo's title bout in that tournament never took place.

Castillo was undefeated in 36 bouts, with 18 knockout wins, when he challenged James Martinez for the USBA featherweight title on June 15, 1979, in Las Vegas. Castillo conquered the United States Boxing Association's title with a twelve round decision win over Martinez. He won his next five bouts, four of them by knockout, including a three round victory over Eusebio Pedroza world title challenger Hector Carrasquilla and a points victory over Fel Clemente, who had challenged Danny Lopez for the WBC world title.

=== WBC Super Featherweight Championship ===
With a record of 42 wins and no previous losses, and 22 knockouts, Castillo received his first world title try: On January 20, 1980, Castillo went up in weight to challenge WBC world Jr. Lightweight champion Alexis Argüello in Tucson. The fight proved to be a close one, with Arguello leading on two judges' cards by only one point and Castillo leading the other card by a single point also, before Arguello knocked Castillo out in round eleven to retain his title.

=== WBC Featherweight Championship ===
After the loss to Arguello, Castillo returned to the Featherweight division, winning another fight before receiving his second title try; On April 12 of the same year, Castillo challenged WBC world Featherweight champion Salvador Sánchez in Tucson. Castillo was ahead after six rounds, but ultimately lost a fifteen-round unanimous decision.

Castillo won nine of his next twelve bouts, losing one and drawing (tying) two. This allowed him to keep his ranking as number one challenger by the WBC, and so, on February 20, 1983, he received his third world title try, when he challenged Juan Laporte, who had relieved Sanchez as WBC world champion after Sanchez died in a car accident. This bout was held at Roberto Clemente Coliseum in San Juan, Puerto Rico. He won some of the middle rounds on the judges' scorecards, but Laporte sealed his twelve round unanimous decision victory when he dropped Castillo in round eleven and again in round twelve. The fight was televised live on ABC Wide World of Sports.

Castillo came back to boxing eight months later, knocking Miguel Hernandez out in three rounds at Los Angeles. He won five fights in 1984, including a tenth round knockout victory over Andres Felix and a ten round decision win against Oscar Bejines.

=== WBC Super Featherweight Championship ===
On April 19, 1985, Castillo received his fourth world title try, when he challenged Julio César Chávez for Chávez's WBC world Jr. Lightweight title, as part of a boxing program that also featured Juan Meza's WBC world Super-Bantamweight title defense against Mike Ayala. Castillo once again lost, when Chávez beat him by a sixth round knockout.

His next fight took place in Brazil: trying to keep a privileged ranking among Jr. Lightweights, and to obtain a rematch with Chávez, Castillo lost a ten round decision to Tomas Da Cruz on August 18 in São Paulo. Da Cruz, in turn, lost to Chávez by a third round knockout the following year. Castillo, by his part, fought once more, beating Martin Morado by a ten round decision on March 4, 1986, then announced his first retirement. This retirement lasted three years. In 1989, he made an unsuccessful comeback bid, losing two fights, and requiring hospitalization after being knocked out in the fifth round on August 30 by Edgar Castro. This led to his second retirement from boxing.

=== Career as broadcaster ===
Before his second retirement, he had been hired as blow-by-blow analyst by the Western United States television sports channel, ASPN. Castillo called world title fights for this channel, such as the time when Gilberto Roman successfully defended his WBC world Jr. Bantamweight title by defeating Puerto Rican Juan Carazo by a twelve round decision.

After retiring for the second time, Castillo was active as broadcaster for ASPN, analyzing fights in many places across the United States' southwest. He became a popular sportscaster, both among Hispanic and Anglo boxing fans. In 1995, however, ASPN was sold to another network, and Castillo found himself unemployed.

=== Third comeback ===
Ruben Castillo made his third comeback as a professional boxer in 1995. On May 24 of that year, he knocked Javier Valardez out in the second round at Bakersfield. The fight was televised nationally on Telemundo, and a small gathering (for a boxing fight) of about 2,000 fans gave him a standing ovation after the fight was over. Telemundo broadcasters said that the ovation proved Castillo's popularity among Bakersfield residents.

He won five fights and lost one (to Fabian Tejada, a well known Argentine boxer of the era), before challenging for the regional, NABO Lightweight title. He won that championship by outpointing Manny Castillo over twelve rounds on September 24, 1996 in Tempe, Arizona. After losing his next bout, a third round knockout defeat against Rudy Zavala, however, Castillo retired for good. He lost to Zavala on March 20, 1997 in Reseda, California. Castillo had a record of 67 wins, 10 losses and 2 draws, with 37 knockout wins as a professional boxer.

== Personal life and death ==
Castillo had a total of 10 children, including two sets of twins and a daughter, Misti, who died on the day of her 37th birthday.

He resided in Covina, CA for 30 years prior to retiring in Beaumont, CA. Castillo died in Beaumont from cancer on February 24, 2026, at the age of 68.

He was very good friends with Juan Laporte, who beat him in 1983.

Castillo acted in the 1988 film Fists of Steel.
