= Salvador Sánchez =

Mexican boxer (1959–1982)

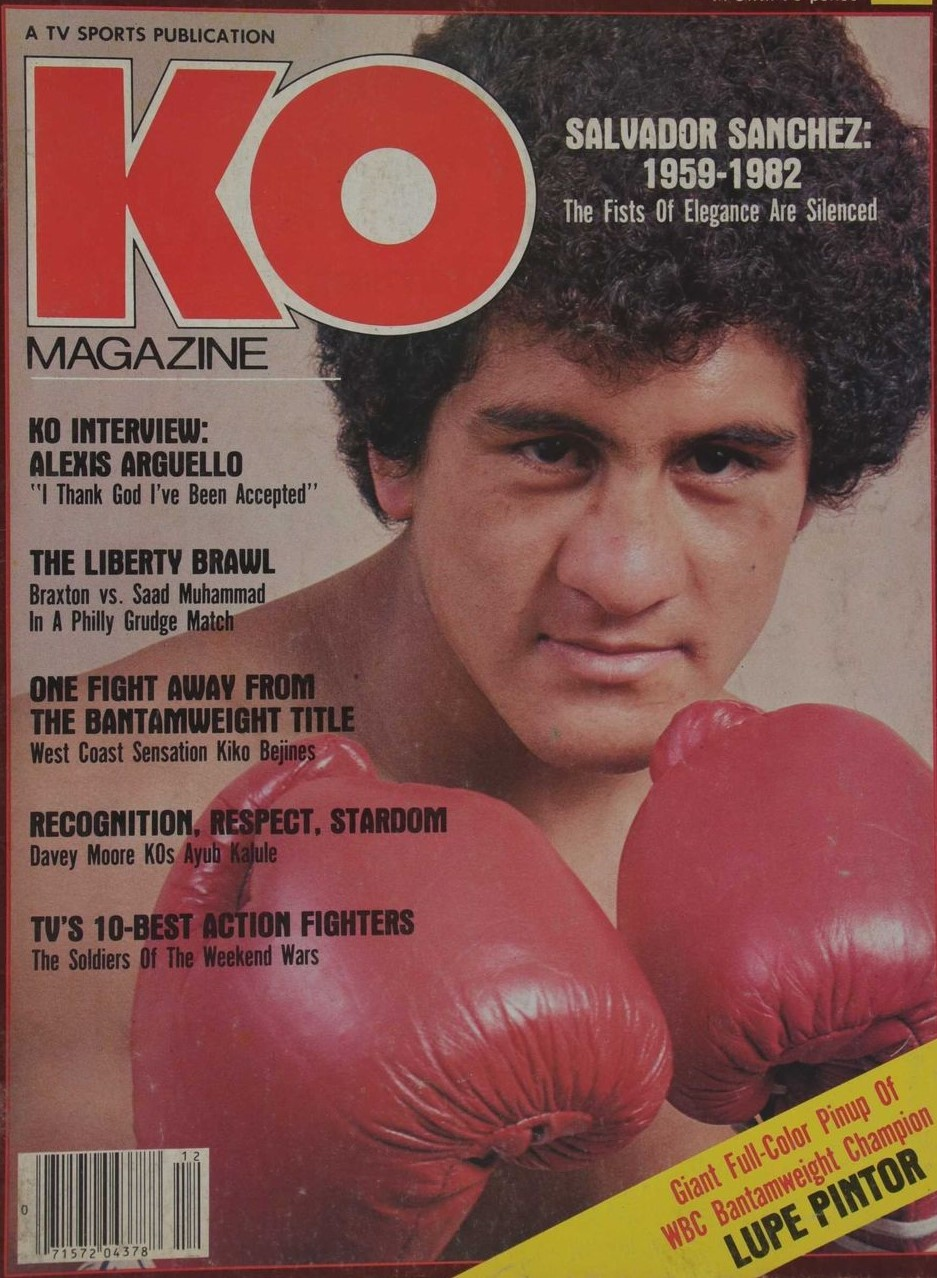
- Sánchez posthumously on the cover of an issue of KO Magazine, cover dated December 1982

Personal information
- Nicknames: The Invincible Eagle; The Champ; Chava; Mr. Pulmones (Mr. Lungs); Iron Lung
- Born: Salvador Sánchez Narváez; January 26, 1959 Santiago Tianguistenco, State of Mexico, Mexico
- Died: August 12, 1982 (aged 23) Querétaro, Mexico
- Height: 5 ft 7 in (170 cm)
- Weight: Bantamweight; Featherweight; Super featherweight

Boxing career
- Reach: 67 1/2 in (171 cm)
- Stance: Orthodox

Boxing record
- Total fights: 46
- Wins: 44
- Win by KO: 32
- Losses: 1
- Draws: 1

Salvador Sánchez Narváez (January 26, 1959 – August 12, 1982) was a Mexican professional boxer. Sánchez was the WBC and The Ring featherweight champion from 1980 to 1982. Many of his contemporaries as well as boxing writers believe that had it not been for his premature death, Sánchez could have gone on to become the greatest featherweight boxer of all time. Sánchez died on August 12, 1982, in a car accident while driving from Querétaro to San Luis Potosí. He is also the uncle of Salvador Sánchez II.

In 1991, Sánchez was inducted into the International Boxing Hall of Fame. The Ring magazine named both him, and Sugar Ray Leonard, as Fighter of the Year in 1981. In 2002, he was named the 24th greatest fighter of the past 80 years by The Ring magazine. In 2003, The Ring rated Sánchez number 88 on the list of 100 greatest punchers of all time. Sánchez was voted as the #3 featherweight of the 20th century by the Associated Press. In 2026, the WBC named him their greatest featherweight champion of all time.

== Early life ==
Sanchez was born to father Felipe Sanchez and to mother María Luisa Narvaez in Santiago Tianguistenco, State of Mexico.

== Professional career ==
Sánchez started his professional career at the age of 16, as a teenager (after a brief amateur career consisting of reportedly four amateur bouts) he started piling up wins against tough Mexican opposition. His first fight of note came in his 19th professional fight against the Mexican bantamweight champion Antonio Becerra. Becerra proved too experienced for the young Sánchez, the bout ended in a split decision defeat for Sánchez.

Sánchez kept on fighting and moved to the Featherweight division. Soon he had beaten people like the Puerto Rican featherweight champion Felix Trinidad Sr., on his way to securing a title shot at world champion Danny "Little Red" Lopez, a popular TV fighter of the late 1970s who was an impressive fighter and had won some spectacular fights against the likes of former world champion David Kotei (twice), Juan Malvares and Mike Ayala. Confident and hard to beat, Lopez was beaten by the 21-year-old Sánchez, who knocked out the defending champion in 13 rounds in Phoenix, Arizona, United States on February 2, 1980. Sánchez defended his title for the first time with a 15-round unanimous decision against Ruben Castillo (47–1). Thinking it was just a case of 'beginner's luck' (as it was Sánchez's first world title fight ever), Lopez looked for a rematch and this he got, in Las Vegas. This time Sánchez defeated Lopez by 14th-round TKO. In his next fight, he defeated Patrick Ford (15–0) .

On December 13, 1980, Sánchez defeated future champion Juan Laporte by unanimous decision. Sánchez then defended his title against Roberto Castanon (43–1–0) and scored a win over Nicky Perez (50–3–0). Then undefeated World Jr Featherweight champion Wilfredo Gómez (32–0–1) went up in weight and challenged Sánchez. Sánchez retained the crown by a knockout in round eight on August 21, 1981, in Las Vegas, and Gómez had to return to the Jr. Featherweight division.

Following this victory, Salvador sustained a great increase in popularity, becoming widely known across the United States.

In his next fight, he defeated Olympic medalist Pat Cowdell by split decision. His defense vs unheralded Jorge "Rocky" Garcia was the second fight featuring two featherweights ever to be televised by HBO, the first having been his contest with Cowdell. He beat Garcia punch after punch, but the challenger gave honor to his nickname, an unknown fighter who lasts the distance with the world champion.

On July 21, 1982, Sánchez faced future champion Azumah Nelson at Madison Square Garden. Nelson, a late substitute for mandatory challenger Mario Miranda, was unknown at the time however, and was expected to only go a few rounds with the champ. It was an intense battle, with Sánchez managing to drop his young charge in the 7th round. After that they engaged in violent exchange after violent exchange. In the 15th, Sánchez broke out finally, connecting with a serious combination that dropped the challenger almost outside the ring. Referee Tony Perez had to stop the fight seconds later. Azumah Nelson went on to have a glittering career and was inducted into the International Boxing Hall of Fame in 2004.

Sánchez proved a dominant featherweight champion. He held title defense victories over the next three fighters (LaPorte, Gomez, and Nelson) who won the WBC title after his death. He went 4–0, all by knockout, against fellow members of the International Boxing Hall of Fame (Danny Lopez twice-KO 13, KO 14-Wilfredo Gomez-KO 8-and Azumah Nelson-KO 15) and defeated four future or former world champions (Lopez, Gomez, LaPorte and Nelson).

== Death ==
Three weeks after his victory over Nelson, as he was training for a rematch with Laporte set for September, Sanchez crashed on the early morning of August 12, 1982, while driving his Porsche 928 sports car along the federal highway between Querétaro and San Luis Potosí, dying instantly. At the time of his death, there were talks about a bout with Colombian Mario Miranda, a rematch with Gómez or a challenge of world lightweight champion Alexis Argüello. Salvador Sánchez finished his career 44–1–1. Sánchez was posthumously inducted into the International Boxing Hall of Fame in 1991.

== Acting ==
Sánchez appeared as himself, albeit as a Junior Lightweight world champion, in the 1983 film The Last Fight, released after his death. The movie was dedicated to him. In it, Sánchez shared scenes with Rubén Blades, who played a challenger to Sánchez's title.

== Personal life ==
Sánchez had a wife, María Teresa, and two sons, Cristián Salvador and Omar. He also had a nephew, Salvador Sánchez II, who was a professional boxer. He also had another nephew, Miguel A.L.S., who was an engineer.

== Professional boxing record ==
46 fights	44 wins	1 loss
By knockout	32	0
By decision	12	1
Draws	1	

No	Result	Record	Opponent	Type	Round, time	Date	Location	Notes
46	Win	44–1–1	Azumah Nelson	TKO	15 (15), 1:49	Jul 21, 1982	Madison Square Garden, New York City, New York, U.S.	Retained WBC and The Ring featherweight titles
45	Win	43–1–1	Jorge Garcia	UD	15	May 8, 1982	Reunion Arena, Dallas, Texas, U.S.	Retained WBC and The Ring featherweight titles
44	Win	42–1–1	Pat Cowdell	SD	15	Dec 12, 1981	Astrodome, Houston, Texas, U.S.	Retained WBC and The Ring featherweight titles
43	Win	41–1–1	Wilfredo Gómez	TKO	8 (15), 2:09	Aug 21, 1981	Caesars Palace, Las Vegas, Nevada, U.S.	Retained WBC and The Ring featherweight titles
42	Win	40–1–1	Nicky Perez	UD	10	Jul 11, 1981	Olympic Auditorium, Los Angeles, California, U.S.	
41	Win	39–1–1	Roberto Castañón	TKO	10 (15), 1:09	Mar 22, 1981	Caesars Palace, Las Vegas, Nevada, U.S.	Retained WBC and The Ring featherweight titles
40	Win	38–1–1	Juan Laporte	UD	15	Dec 13, 1980	County Coliseum, El Paso, Texas, U.S.	Retained WBC and The Ring featherweight titles
39	Win	37–1–1	Patrick Ford	MD	15	Sep 13, 1980	Freeman Coliseum, San Antonio, Texas, U.S.	Retained WBC and The Ring featherweight titles
38	Win	36–1–1	Danny Lopez	TKO	14 (15), 1:42	Jun 21, 1980	Caesars Palace, Las Vegas, Nevada, U.S.	Retained WBC and The Ring featherweight titles
37	Win	35–1–1	Ruben Castillo	UD	15	Apr 12, 1980	Civic Auditorium, Tucson, Arizona, U.S.	Retained WBC and The Ring featherweight titles
36	Win	34–1–1	Danny Lopez	TKO	13 (15), 0:51	Feb 2, 1980	Veteran's Memorial Coliseum, Phoenix, Arizona, U.S.	Won WBC and The Ring featherweight titles
35	Win	33–1–1	Rafael Gandarilla	TKO	5 (10)	Dec 15, 1979	Guadalajara, Jalisco, Mexico	
34	Win	32–1–1	Richard Rozelle	KO	3 (10), 1:55	Sep 15, 1979	Sports Arena, Los Angeles, California, U.S.	
33	Win	31–1–1	Félix Trinidad Sr.	TKO	5 (10)	Aug 7, 1979	Summit, Houston, Texas, U.S.	
32	Win	30–1–1	Rosalio Muro	KO	3 (10)	Jul 22, 1979	San Luis Potosí, San Luis Potosí, Mexico	
31	Win	29–1–1	Fel Clemente	UD	12	Jun 17, 1979	Convention Center Arena, San Antonio, Texas, U.S.	
30	Win	28–1–1	Salvador Torres	TKO	7 (10)	May 19, 1979	Mexico City, Distrito Federal, Mexico	
29	Win	27–1–1	James Martinez	UD	10	Mar 13, 1979	San Antonio, Texas, U.S.	
28	Win	26–1–1	Carlos Mimila	KO	3 (10)	Feb 3, 1979	Mexico City, Distrito Federal, Mexico	
27	Win	25–1–1	José Santana	TKO	2 (10)	Dec 16, 1978	Mexico City, Distrito Federal, Mexico	
26	Win	24–1–1	Edwin Alarcon	TKO	9 (10)	Nov 21, 1978	San Antonio, Texas, U.S.	
25	Win	23–1–1	Francisco Ponce	KO	2 (10)	Sep 26, 1978	Houston, Texas, U.S.	
24	Win	22–1–1	Hector Cortez	TKO	7 (10)	Aug 13, 1978	Mazatlán, Sinaloa, Mexico	
23	Win	21–1–1	José Sánchez	UD	10	Jul 1, 1978	Mexico City, Distrito Federal, Mexico	
22	Draw	20–1–1	Juan Escobar	MD	10	Mar 15, 1978	Olympic Auditorium, Los Angeles, California, U.S.	
21	Win	20–1	Eliseo Cosme	PTS	10	Dec 5, 1977	Mexico City, Distrito Federal, Mexico	
20	Win	19–1	José Luis Soto	PTS	10	Nov 11, 1977	Mexico City, Distrito Federal, Mexico	
19	Loss	18–1	Antonio Becerra	SD	12	Sep 9, 1977	Mazatlán, Sinaloa, Mexico	For vacant Mexico bantamweight title
18	Win	18–0	Rosalio Badillo	TKO	5 (10)	May 21, 1977	Mexico City, Distrito Federal, Mexico	
17	Win	17–0	Daniel Felizardo	KO	5 (10)	Mar 12, 1977	Mexico City, Distrito Federal, Mexico	
16	Win	16–0	Raúl López	TKO	10 (10)	Feb 5, 1977	Mexicali, Baja California, Mexico	
15	Win	15–0	Antonio Leon	TKO	10 (10)	Dec 25, 1976	Mexico City, Distrito Federal, Mexico	
14	Win	14–0	Saul Montana	TKO	9 (10)	Oct 31, 1976	Nuevo Laredo, Tamaulipas, Mexico	
13	Win	13–0	Joel Valdez	TKO	9 (10)	Aug 11, 1976	Mexico City, Distrito Federal, Mexico	
12	Win	12–0	Pedro Sandoval	TKO	9 (10)	Jul 5, 1976	Mexico City, Distrito Federal, Mexico	
11	Win	11–0	Fidel Trejo	KO	6 (10)	May 26, 1976	Mexico City, Distrito Federal, Mexico	
10	Win	10–0	Jose Chavez	TKO	7 (10)	Apr 24, 1976	Mexico City, Distrito Federal, Mexico	
9	Win	9–0	Serafin Isidro Pacheco	TKO	4 (8)	Mar 31, 1976	Mexico City, Distrito Federal, Mexico	
8	Win	8–0	Javier Solis	TKO	7 (8)	Feb 25, 1976	Mexico City, Distrito Federal, Mexico	
7	Win	7–0	Juan Granados	TKO	3 (8)	Jan 24, 1976	Mexico City, Distrito Federal, Mexico	
6	Win	6–0	Fidel Trejo	UD	8	Dec 11, 1975	Mexico City, Distrito Federal, Mexico	
5	Win	5–0	Candido Sandoval	TKO	7 (8)	Nov 25, 1975	Mexico City, Distrito Federal, Mexico	
4	Win	4–0	Cesar Lopez	KO	4 (6)	Oct 19, 1975	Misantla, Veracruz, Mexico	
3	Win	3–0	Victor Martinez	KO	2 (6)	Aug 10, 1975	Misantla, Veracruz, Mexico	
2	Win	2–0	Miguel Ortiz	KO	3 (4)	May 25, 1975	Misantla, Varacruz, Mexico	
1	Win	1–0	Al Gardeno	KO	3 (4)	May 4, 1975	Veracruz, Veracruz, Mexico	

== Trivia ==
In the movie 21, Ben Campbell, played by Jim Sturgess, introduces himself to a girl as Salvador Sánchez.

Folk Rock band Sun Kil Moon recorded an eponymous song about Sanchez on their 2003 album Ghosts of the Great Highway.

== See also ==
- Notable boxing families
- List of Mexican boxing world champions
- List of WBC world champions
- Salvador Sanchez vs. Juan Laporte
- Salvador Sánchez vs. Wilfredo Gómez
- List of Mexicans
- Kelvin Kiptum - Another athlete who died in a car crash at a similar age

Sporting positions
World boxing titles
Preceded by Danny Lopez	WBC featherweight champion February 2, 1980 – August 12, 1982; Vacant upon death	Vacant Title next held by Juan Laporte
Preceded by Danny Lopez	The Ring featherweight champion February 2, 1980 – August 12, 1982; Vacant upon death	Vacant Title next held by Eusebio Pedroza
Records
Preceded by Masao Ohba	Latest born world champion to die August 12 – December 3, 1982	Succeeded by Netrnoi Sor Vorasingh
