= Danilo Cabrera =

Dominican boxer (born 1961)

Danilo Cabrera (born September 23, 1961) is a former professional boxer from the Dominican Republic. Known in professional boxing circles as "Cuero Duro" ("Hard Leather"), he fought for world championships three times, losing to International Boxing Hall of Fame members Barry McGuigan, Azumah Nelson and Julio Cesar Chavez Sr., respectively.

== Professional boxing career ==
Cabrera beat Luis Ramos, 1-2 coming in, by second round knockout on March 25, 1983 in Santiago de los Caballeros to begin his professional boxing career. He beat Ramos again by fifth round knockout in an immediate rematch, only three weeks later. Cabrera scored nine straight knockout victories before facing Emilio Hernandez, a Venezuelan boxer who, with a record of 5 wins and 10 losses, had challenged Carlos Zárate for the Mexican's World Boxing Council's world Bantamweight title during 1978. On November 16, 1983 at Santiago de los Caballeros, Cabrera and Hernandez headlined a boxing program that also featured future world champion Cesar Polanco; Cabrera winning by seventh round knockout to increase his knockout win streak to ten in a row.

Manuel Batista, a fellow Dominican with an 11-0 record, became the first person not to lose by knockout as a professional boxer against Cabrera, battling him for ten rounds but losing a points decision to Cabrera on December 7 at Santiago de los Caballeros.

On January 21, 1984, Cabrera made his first fight outside Santiago de los Caballeros, when he met debuting Manuel Garcia at the Dominican city of La Vega. Cabrera won this bout by first round knockout.

On March 12, 1984, Cabrera became the Dominican Republic's national featherweight champion by defeating the debuting Jose de Jesus Acosta by second round knockout to lift the vacant national championship in Santiago de los Caballeros.

By this point of his career, Cabrera was 13-0, with 12 wins by way of knockout. But in a rematch with Manuel Batista, by now 14-1 himself, Cabrera lost his undefeated status and the Dominican Republic's national featherweight title when knocked out in the third round by Batista at Santiago de los Caballeros on May 31, 1984.

Over his next ten contests, Cabrera went 9-1, with 7 wins by knockout, losing only to Erskine Wade in what was Cabrera's United States debut, at Saginaw, Michigan, but also beating former world title challenger Carlos Pinango; this 9-1 run set him up for another challenge for the Dominican Republic's national featherweight title against champion, 7 wins, 11 losses and 2 draws (ties) Jose "Monito" Jimenez, who had upset Batista for the championship. On November 25, 1985, Cabrera regained the title by outpointing Jimenez over 12 rounds at Santiago de los Caballeros.

=== First world title fight ===
Cabrera was then one of the top ten challengers in the world in the featherweight division by the World Boxing Association and thus was allowed to challenge the WBA's world champion Barry McGuigan in a fifteen round contest which was held at The Royal Dublin Society in Dublin, Ireland on Saturday, February 15, 1986 . Cabrera impressed boxing critics and fans when he opened a cut under the champion's left eye and fought stubbornly before being stopped in round fourteen, with McGuigan retaining the world title by a fourteenth round technical knockout. There was some controversy regarding the stoppage as Cabrera was floored by the champion but got up and tried to pick up his mouthpiece from the canvas (an action which was legal in many countries around the world on professional boxing matches but apparently not in Ireland) when referee Ed Eckert waived the bout off, giving McGuigan a knockout win. McGuigan was comfortably ahead on points by the time the fight was stopped.

=== Second world title fight ===
Due in part to the controversy surrounding his defeat at the hands of McGuigan, Cabrera was immediately given another try at a world featherweight championship, this time by the World Boxing Council, which sanctioned a fight between Cabrera and WBC world champion, Ghana's Azumah Nelson on Sunday, June 22, 1986 at the Hiram Bithorn Stadium in San Juan, Puerto Rico. Despite this being a truly international world title fight as it featured boxers from two different countries in a third, neutral one (Puerto Rico), Cabrera was considered to have a bit of home advantage in this fight because of the large amount of Dominican Republic nationals that had adopted Puerto Rico as their second home country, whom local promoters and fight organizers hoped would come to the bout to cheer their countryman on.

Again, Cabrera fought stubbornly, gaining the respect of boxing fans and critics alike; he was, however, deeply behind on the scorecards when Nelson retained the world title by knocking him out in round ten of a scheduled twelve rounds contest.

Cabrera returned to the winning column, with three victories in a row, including a defense of his Dominican Republic's featherweight title (a third round knockout of 1 win, 5 losses challenger Antonio Rodriguez on Monday, September 29, 1986 at Santo Domingo) before he went up in weight to the super-featherweight division and challenged the 7 wins, 3 losses national champion Roberto Nunez for the Dominican Republic's national super-featherweight title. On February 16, 1987, Cabrera became a two division national champion by knocking out Nunez in six rounds at Santiago de los Caballeros, but he lost the title in his first defense, a rematch fight with the by then 8 wins, 12 losses and 2 ties Jose Jimenez, being outpointed by Jimenez over twelve rounds at Santiago de los Caballeros on May 11, 1987.

=== Third world title fight ===
Despite that loss, after a win over unheralded Rafael Arias (0-4 coming in, a fifth round knockout win on June 8 at Santiago de los Caballeros) Cabrera was given a third world championship fight, his second fight sanctioned by the World Boxing Council, against the 55-0, WBC world super featherweight champion Julio Cesar Chavez Sr. on August 21, 1987 at Jorge Hank Rhon's property, the Hipodromo de Agua Caliente horse racing race tracks in Tijuana, Mexico. Again, Cabrera gained fans' and critics' respect, this time by lasting the twelve rounds distance against the hard punching Mexican world champion, despite taking a substantial beating. He lost the fight by unanimous decision, with two scores of 120-102 and one of 120-105 all against him. Cabrera did not win a single round on any of the three judges' scorecards.

=== Rest of career ===
Cabrera lost eight of his last ten fights, including bouts with Brian Mitchell (another member of the International Boxing Hall of Fame, Cabrera lost to him by ten rounds unanimous decision on June 4, 1988 in Johannesburg, South Africa), Dingaan Thobela, Argentina's Juan Martin Coggi, Regilio Tuur, Jean-Baptiste Mendy and Jacobin Yoma. He retired after losing to Yoma by sixth round knockout on October 30, 1992 in Cayenne, French Guiana.

== Professional boxing record ==
Cabrera had a professional boxing record of 31 wins and 14 losses in 45 professional boxing fights, with 25 wins and 9 losses by knockout.

== See also ==
- List of Dominicans
