= Pat Ford =

Pat Ford may refer to:

== Sports ==
- Pat Ford (boxer) (born 1931), Australian boxer
- Pat Ford (ice hockey) (born 1964), Canadian ice hockey player and head coach

== Others ==
- Pat Ford, founder of WinCustomize
- Pat Ford, musician in Colossal
- Pat Ford, producer for The David Pakman Show

== See also ==
- Pat Forde, sports journalist
- Patrick Ford (disambiguation)
- Patricia Ford (disambiguation)
