= Francisco Bejines =

Mexican boxer (1962–1983)

Francisco "Kiko" Bejines (January 1, 1962 – September 4, 1983) was a professional boxer from Guadalajara, Jalisco, Mexico. He was a top-rated Bantamweight who fought for the WBC's world Bantamweight title, dying days after his championship bout against Alberto Davila.

== Pre-fight career ==
Francisco Bejines made his professional boxing debut on September 16, 1977, against undefeated (2–0) Rodolfo Quintero at the Arena Coliseo in Guadalajara. He outpointed his rival over eight rounds. His very next fight was his first ten round test, as he battled undefeated (7–0–1) Miguel Navarro, who knocked Bejines out in round eight on October 21 of the same year, also at the Arena Coliseo.

On November 25, only one month and four days after his first loss, Bejines was back in a ring as a professional, facing David Vera (6–3). Bejines scored his first professional knockout win when he beat Vera in round eight of a scheduled ten rounds.

Bejines' first 1978 bout took place on February 17 at the Arena Coliseo when he took on 1–4 Anastacio Chavez, beating Chavez by ten round decision. Six months later, he faced undefeated Rosendo Alonso, 6–0–1 coming in, and lost to him by ten round decision on August 11. On September 8, Bejines returned to the winning column, notching a ten round points victory against Agustin Macias, 5–2 coming in. Bejines' last fight in 1978 was a rematch with Rodolfo Quintero, who by then had a record of 2–2, and who was again beaten by Bejines, this time by decision over ten rounds, on November 3.

1979 proved to be, boxing-wise, a busy year for Bejines, as he fought nine times, beginning with a February 2 fifth round knockout of undefeated but also inexperienced (1–0) Lupe Torres; a March 16 technical decision loss to Manuel Luna (2–5) in what constituted a small upset when a clash of heads in round six left Luna, who was winning the bout on the judges scorecards, unable to continue; a June 8 second round knockout win against debuting Jorge Martinez; a June 22 first round knockout win versus the also debuting Jesus Garcia; a July 13 third round knockout win against 0–1 Victor Hernandez; a step-up in class to face 22–10 boxing veteran Francisco Javier Nunez-whom he beat by three round technical decision August 10 when Nunez slipped to the canvas and sustained a dangerous cut, not being able to continue and Bejines winning the Jalisco state Bantamweight championship; a first round knockout on October 12 of 5–4 Jorge Manuel Vera; a November 16 fight against 0–1 Leonardo Martinez; beaten by knockout in two, and Bejines' first defense of the Jalisco state Bantamweight title, when he lost by a twelve round decision in a rematch with 15–3–1 Rosendo Alonso, on December 14.

Bejines had a less busy year in 1980. Nevertheless, he still fought seven times that year, including twice in a seven-day span and twice in a six-day one. On May 24, he faced 5–6–1 Hector Cortes, winning by a ten round decision. On June 26, he followed that victory with a losing effort; this time against 3–4 Ramiro Garcia in a minor upset, in what was his first fight outside Guadalajara, the bout being held at Uruapan, Michoacan de Ocampo. Three months and a half later, on October 4, Bejines fought Fabian Palma, 4–7–2 coming in, and knocked him out in round one in what was Bejines' Mexico City debut. Seven days later, on October 11, Bejines boxed world ranked Ecuadorian Hector Cortez (no relation to Bejines' earlier rival on the same year), 30–6–3, winning by first round knockout which made him ranked among the world's top ten Bantamweights by the WBC. On November 16, Bejines re-matched Leonardo Martinez, now 0–2, and beat him by a second round knockout, and on November 22, he beat 8–3 Freddy Martinez by a third round knockout before making his debut abroad, his first fight in the United States, against future Jeff Chandler beater and world title challenger Oscar Muniz, who outpointed Bejines over ten rounds on December 11 at the Olympic Auditorium, in Los Angeles, California.

1981 saw Bejines fight Jose Resendez, 13–17–1, beaten on points in ten rounds on January 22 at the Olympic Auditorium; 2–3 Gilberto Villacana, knocked out in three rounds on February 22 at Houston, Texas; 12–6–4 Franco Torregrosa, outpointed over ten rounds on March 19 at the Olympic Auditorium; 2–12–1 Calvin Sheppard, beaten by unanimous ten round decision on August 1 at the Olympic Auditorium; undefeated (9–0) Adriano Arreola, who'd' later last ten rounds against Julio César Chávez and beat Lupe Pintor-and whom Bejines defeated by six round knockout on August 20 at the Inglewood Forum; 2–4–1 Ruben Solorio, defeated by Bejines by way of a ten round decision on October 1 at the Olympic Auditorium, and 22–2, former WBA and Ring Magazine world Bantamweight champion, Puerto Rican Julian Solís, who was dropped four times by Bejines before Bejines prevailed by a seventh round technical knockout, also at the Olympic Auditorium. By then, Bejines was well known and popular among boxing audiences in the United States' southwest as well.

Bejines continued his rise on the WBC's Bantamweight rankings during 1982, meeting and defeating several ranked fighters and losing only to one, including Javier Flores, 25–12–3, beaten by seventh round knockout on January 20 at the Olympic Auditorium, Venezuelan Jovito Rengifo-who had previously challenged Lupe Pintor for the WBC world title-whom Bejines outpointed over ten rounds at the Olympic Auditorium on March 5, recent Pintor challenger Hurricane Teru, who had gone fifteen rounds with Pintor before getting knocked out in another world title fight; taken out in four rounds by Bejines June 3 at the Olympic Auditorium, and another Venezuelan, Edgar Roman, who in 1984 would challenge Richie Sandoval for his WBA world Bantamweight title and who beat Bejines by a fifth round knockout on August 12 at the Olympic Auditorium.

== World title fight ==
In the wake of the death of South Korean boxer Duk Koo Kim, who died four days after challenging Ray Mancini for the latter's WBA world Lightweight title, the WBC voted to have its world title fights reduced in distance from 15 rounds to 12, effective 1983. The first world title fight with the reduced distance as scheduled was between WBC Junior Bantamweight champion Rafael Orono of Venezuela and Pedro Romero, Orono retaining the title by a fourth round knockout.

Meanwhile, WBC world Bantamweight champion Lupe Pintor suffered a vehicular accident and was sidelined by injury. The WBC then ordered Bejines and Alberto Davila to fight for the WBC's vacant interim world title, in a twelve round bout to take place September 1, 1983. The fight's referee was the experienced Puerto Rican of German descent, Waldemar Schmidt.

Bejines and Davila boxed for eleven rounds without landing particularly hard punches. Bejines was leading on two of the three judges scorecards before the final round began. About 25 seconds into the round, Davila, realizing he was behind on the scorecards, landed a left jab which stunned Bejines, followed by a hard right to the chin which dropped Bejines, who hit his head against the lower rope. Bejines tried to get up, but referee Schmidt stopped the bout.

== After the fight ==
Ringside physicians tried to revive Bejines, but he did not respond to treatment. He was then taken to California Hospital, from where he was airlifted to Los Angeles County-University of Southern California Medical Center, where several attempts were made at saving his life the following days, including the removal of part of his brain and skull and of a blood clot to try to diminish his brain pressure. Bejines was held on a respirator machine until he died on September 4.

Bejines' death was the first in professional boxing since Kim's; it was also the first involving a boxer after a fight at the Olympic Auditorium since Johnny Owen's after his unsuccessful challenge of Pintor in 1980.

Davila was later named full champion by the WBC once Pintor decided not to return to the Bantamweight division. The WBC, on the other part, was criticized for sanctioning this bout, especially since Bejines had lost his prior fight.

Bejines had a record of 27 wins and 8 losses in 35 bouts, 16 wins by knockout.

== Personal ==
Bejines' wife was pregnant with his baby when he died. His brother, Oscar Bejines, was also a professional boxer of note during the 1980s and 1990s.
