= Mario Miranda (boxer) =

Colombian boxer (born 1960)

Personal information
- Born: Mario Alberto Miranda Maraňon; May 15, 1960 Barranquilla, Colombia
- Weight: featherweight, junior lightweight

Boxing career
- Stance: orthodox

Boxing record
- Total fights: 46
- Wins: 41
- Win by KO: 24
- Losses: 3
- Draws: 2

Mario Alberto Miranda Maraňon (born 15 May 1960) is a Colombian former professional boxer and boxing trainer who is best known for his 1982 challenge for the WBC's world featherweight title. Set to face legendary Mexican, world champion Salvador Sanchez for the title, Miranda, who was the number one challenger ranked by the WBC, was in line to face the winner of a rematch fight between Sanchez and Puerto Rico's Juan Laporte, which was scheduled for September 15 of that year at New York City's Madison Square Garden. Due to Sanchez's unexpected death on August 12 of that year, however, Miranda fought Laporte for the vacant world title instead, losing the contest by technical knockout.

Miranda was the Colombian national featherweight and North American Boxing Federation's junior lightweight champion.

A former carpenter, Miranda's ring nickname was "Martillo" ("The Hammer"). He is also an amateur singer and has a YouTube channel in which he posts videos of himself singing.

== Early life ==
Miranda was born in the northern Colombian city of Barranquilla. As a youngster, Miranda enjoyed other sports, specially swimming. One day, he passed by a boxing club and was attracted to the action inside, so he decided to give boxing a try.

== Professional boxing career ==
Miranda debuted as a professional boxer on Saturday, June 9, 1979 in Barranquilla, defeating Edelmiro Cassiani by a six-rounds decision.

He set a torrid pace, winning his first nineteen contests, thirteen of them by knockout. All of those wins were in his native Colombia. Among those victories were his first knockout win, which took place during his second professional bout, against Jose Jimenez on June 28, 1979, his first fight outside Barranquilla, a fourth-round knockout over Misael Sanchez in Maicao on February 1, 1980, a win on October 30 of 1980 against Armando Perez that made Miranda the Colombian national featherweight champion when he beat Perez by eleventh-round knockout at Barranqulla, and victories over former world title challengers Ruben Valdes, Jose Cervantes, and Juan Malvares; the latter a first-round knockout for the WBC Continental Americas' featherweight championship, as well as a win over former WBC world super bantamweight champion Rigoberto Riasco in a defense of the latter title, and one over future world champion Marcos Villasana of Mexico. These victories helped him get set as the WBC's number one challenger and he was apparently going to challenge Salvador Sanchez or, in the case Sanchez got beaten by his next challenger, Juan Laporte. But all that changed when Sanchez tragically died in a cat accident on August 12, 1982 in Mexico, and Miranda was then set to substitute him and fight Laporte for the vacant WBC world title instead.

== World title fight ==
With a record of 19 wins and 0 losses, with 13 wins by knockout, Miranda traveled to New York city in September 1982, to face Juan Laporte, who had 21 wins and 3 losses with 12 wins by knockout, for the now vacant WBC world featherweight championship. The fight, which took place on September 15 at the Madison Square Garden in New York, was promoted by Don King. It was televised to Colombia, Puerto Rico and the United States.

Miranda tried boxing from the outside and using his reach, but Laporte's strength took a toll on him. He was dropped in the tenth round, and the fight was stopped shortly afterwards, with Laporte winning the world title. Miranda's handlers stopped the fight after the round had finished, and Laporte was credited with a tenth-round technical knockout win. Laporte had praise for Miranda afterwards, declaring that he hit with power. The New York Times also praised Miranda, saying that "(But) although the fight may have been one-sided, it was quick paced and suspenseful because of Miranda's obvious punching power".

The fight with Laporte was also Miranda's first fight abroad, and the first of many in the United States.

== Rest of career ==
Next, Miranda traveled to Colombia's neighboring country of Panama, for a fight against Francisco Fernandez, who had 10 wins and 4 losses in what was supposed to be an easy tune up for the Colombian but instead turned into a struggle. Held on February 5, 1983 as part of a program headlined by a bout between future world champion Alfredo Layne and Aquilino Asprilla, the contest was a close one but Miranda was able to win a ten-rounds majority decision, at the Roberto Duran Arena, then known as "Gimnasio Nuevo Panama" and now named after legendary Panamanian boxer Roberto Duran.

His next fight was another major contest, as he faced former WBA world bantamweight champion Jorge Lujan, also at the Gimnasio Nuevo Panama. This contest took place on Saturday, May 14, 1983, and Lujan beat Miranda by a ten-rounds unanimous decision, with scores of 100-93, 98-95 and 99-94 against the Colombian fighter.

Miranda then established himself as a boxer in the Miami, Florida, area, boxing there as well as in Coconut Grove, Hialeah, Key Biscayne and Miami Beach. He also boxed a lot in Colombia. Although he won 21 of his last 24 bouts, with 1 loss and 2 draws (ties), he did not fight for a world championship again. He fought, among others, Kiko Bejines' brother Oscar, on Thursday, December 19, 1985 at the Olympic Auditorium in Los Angeles, California, in a contest he lost by a ten-rounds decision by wide scores of 99-90, 100-90 and 98-93 against him, and former Julio Cesar Chavez world title challenger Dwight Pratchett, against whom Miranda became the North American Boxing Federation's junior lightweight champion by a twelve-rounds majority decision on Saturday, January 17, 1987 at the Exhibition Center in Coconut Grove.

Miranda defended that title once, against the 21 wins and 4 losses challenger, Raphael Sims on Saturday, July 25, 1987, at the Miami Marine Stadium in Key Biscayne, retaining the title by a very close but unanimous twelve-rounds decision with scores of 116-113, 116-114 and 117-112, all in his favor, as part of a program headlined by a WBC bantamweight world championship contest between Miranda's countryman Miguel Lora, defending his title, and challenger, former WBC world flyweight champion, Mexico;s Antonio Avelar (which Lora won by fourth-round knockout).

Miranda retired after a victory over a 4 wins, 2 losses and 1 draw opponent named Adolfo Gonzalez by a fifth-round technical knockout on Saturday, May 28, 1988 at the Plaza de Toro Monumental del Caribe bullring back home at Barranquilla, in a fight in which he had International Boxing Hall of Famer Antonio Cervantes in his corner and which was televised to Colombia live on Tele Caribe, but he decided to form what turned out to be a short lived comeback to boxing fifteen years later, beating opponent Billy Tibbs twice at the Fort Garry Place in Winnipeg, Canada, first by a four-rounds unanimous decision on Thursday, January 23, 2003, and then, by the same way and also over four rounds, on Thursday, June 3, 2004.

Miranda had 46 professional boxing contests, of which he won 41, lost 3 and drew (tied) 2 times, with 24 wins and only the Laporte loss by knockout.

== Boxing trainer ==
Miranda later became a boxing teacher and trainer.

== Problems with addiction and the law ==
Miranda has admitted that he used drugs and alcohol during his professional boxing days. He says he was not drugged during the Laporte world championship contest, but had used marijuana the day before it.

Miranda was arrested on May 7, 2017, by Colombian police after he allegedly sexually assaulted a 14-year old female. He was eventually let go by the police and returned home. The prosecutor for the case declared that the only crime Miranda committed was walking near the girl and scaring her and she (the prosecutor) considered that no sexual abuse actually took place.

== Health problems ==
According to his lawyer, Gabriel Ramos, Miranda has schizophrenia and he takes medicines for the mental ailment.

== Estewil Quesada ==
Estewil Quesada, a well known reporter who writes for the Colombian newspaper, El Tiempo, has remarked that people often confuse him for the former boxer, including one time in which RCN Radio reporter and future mayor of Cartagena, Campo Teran, spotted him at a baseball game and interviewed him, thinking he was Miranda. Quesada and Miranda first met during 1982, right before Miranda's fight with Juan Laporte.

== See also ==
- List of Colombians
