= Gustavo Ballas =

Argentine boxer (born 1958)

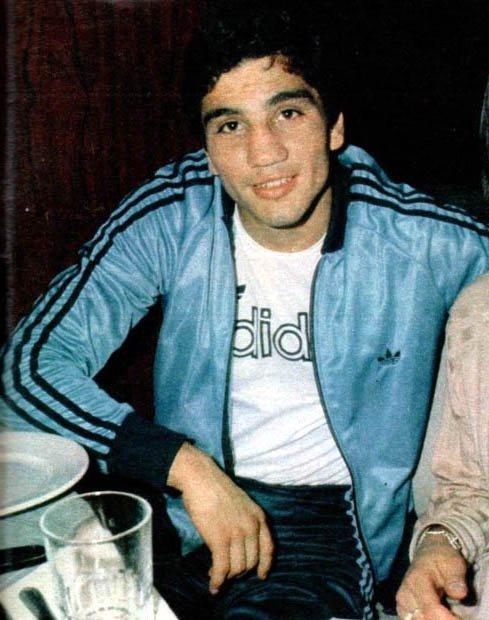
- Ballas in 1981

Personal information
- Nickname: Mandrake
- Born: February 10, 1958 (age 68) Villa María, Córdoba, Argentina
- Height: 5 ft 2 in (157 cm)
- Weight: Super flyweight

Boxing career
- Stance: Orthodox

Boxing record
- Total fights: 120
- Wins: 105
- Win by KO: 29
- Losses: 9
- Draws: 6

Gustavo Ballas (born February 10, 1958) is an Argentine retired super flyweight boxer who fought from 1976 until 1990. He retired with a record of 105 wins (29 KOs), 9 losses and 6 draws.

== Professional career ==
Ballas fought mainly in Argentina. In 1979 he managed to outpoint future multi champion Santos Benigno Laciar in what is a still remembered fight in Argentina

On September 12, 1981 he became the first ever WBA world super flyweight champion by defeating Sok-Chul Bae by TKO 8 in Estadio Luna Park, Buenos Aires, Argentina. Ballas lost the title on his next fight, against Rafael Pedroza in Panama. He was unsuccessful on two other attempts at winning the super flyweight title, one from the WBA against Japanese boxer Jiro Watanabe, and another one for the WBC.

Although he fought 120 times in his career, only four of those fights, all of which he lost, were outside of Argentina, three of them for a world title.

Ballas had trouble after boxing with alcoholism and drug addiction; he was jailed once for robbery. He later started recovering, and has taken part in anti-drugs campaigns.

== Professional boxing record ==
120 fights	105 wins	9 losses
By knockout	29	5
By decision	75	4
By disqualification	1	0
Draws	6	

No.	Result	Record	Opponent	Type	Round, time	Date	Location	Notes
120	Win	105–9–6	José Luis Barrios	KO	6 (10)	Sep 14, 1990	Chascomús, Argentina	
119	Draw	104–9–6	Raúl Ojeda	PTS	10	Sep 7, 1990	Monte Maíz, Argentina	
118	Win	104–9–5	Sergio Andrés Carlevaris	PTS	10	Aug 31, 1990	Trenque Lauquen, Argentina	
117	Draw	103–9–5	Luis Américo Díaz	PTS	10	Aug 10, 1990	Cutral Có, Argentina	
116	Win	103–9–4	Luis Américo Díaz	PTS	10	Aug 3, 1990	Daireaux, Argentina	
115	Win	102–9–4	José Luis Barrios	PTS	10	Jul 13, 1990	Gualeguaychú, Argentina	
114	Win	101–9–4	José Luis Barrios	PTS	10	Jul 6, 1990	Pehuajó, Argentina	
113	Win	100–9–4	Luis Américo Díaz	PTS	10	Jun 10, 1990	Veinticinco de Mayo, Argentina	
112	Win	99–9–4	Raúl Ojeda	PTS	10	May 11, 1990	Laboulaye, Argentina	
111	Win	98–9–4	José Luis Barrios	PTS	10	May 4, 1990	Las Flores, Argentina	
110	Loss	97–9–4	Joao Cardoso	RTD	5 (10)	May 1, 1989	São Paulo, Brazil	
109	Win	97–8–4	Raúl Ojeda	PTS	10	Mar 10, 1989	Mar del Plata, Argentina	
108	Loss	96–8–4	Ignacio Lindor Gorriti	KO	3 (10)	Jan 7, 1989	Villa Carlos Paz, Argentina	
107	Win	96–7–4	Raúl Ojeda	PTS	10	Dec 16, 1988	Juan Bautista Alberdi, Argentina	
106	Win	95–7–4	Jesús Antonio Moreno	TD	5 (10)	Nov 26, 1988	Estadio F.A.B., Buenos Aires, Argentina	
105	Win	94–7–4	Raúl Ojeda	PTS	10	Nov 11, 1988	Río Tercero, Argentina	
104	Win	93–7–4	Ramón Norberto Retamozo	PTS	12	Oct 15, 1988	Pergamino, Argentina	Won vacant Argentine super-flyweight title
103	Win	92–7–4	Héctor Luis Patri	PTS	10	Aug 12, 1988	Viedma, Argentina	
102	Win	91–7–4	Ramón Alfredo Carrizo	PTS	10	Jul 16, 1988	Estadio F.A.B., Buenos Aires, Argentina	
101	Win	90–7–4	Ramón Alfredo Carrizo	PTS	10	May 20, 1988	Río Gallegos, Argentina	
100	Loss	89–7–4	Sugar Baby Rojas	TKO	4 (12), 2:39	Oct 24, 1987	Tamiami Fairgrounds Auditorium, Miami, Florida, U.S.	For WBC super-flyweight title
99	Win	89–6–4	José Rufino Narváez	PTS	10	Aug 14, 1987	Villa María, Argentina	
98	Loss	88–6–4	Rubén Osvaldo Condori	PTS	10	Jun 13, 1987	Estadio Luna Park, Buenos Aires, Argentina	
97	Win	88–5–4	Eloy Alca	PTS	12	May 15, 1987	San Juan, Argentina	Retained South American title and Won Latin American super-flyweight title
96	Win	87–5–4	José Antonio Badilla	PTS	10	Apr 10, 1987	La Rioja, Argentina	
95	Win	86–5–4	José Antonio Badilla	PTS	10	Mar 21, 1987	Estadio Luna Park, Buenos Aires, Argentina	
94	Win	85–5–4	Jaime Miranda	TKO	5 (10)	Feb 6, 1987	Mar del Plata, Argentina	
93	Win	84–5–4	Rubén Osvaldo Condori	PTS	12	Dec 6, 1986	Estadio Luna Park, Buenos Aires, Argentina	Retained South American super-flyweight title
92	Win	83–5–4	Paulo Ribeiro	TKO	6 (12)	Nov 14, 1986	Villa María, Argentina	Won South American super-flyweight title
91	Draw	82–5–4	Juan Carlos Cortés	PTS	10	Aug 30, 1986	Pabellon Verde, Córdoba, Argentina	
90	Win	82–5–3	Ramón Horacio Albers	PTS	10	Aug 15, 1986	Concepción, Argentina	
89	Draw	81–5–3	Adrián Daniel Román	PTS	10	Jul 11, 1986	Córdoba, Argentina	
88	Loss	81–5–2	Rubén Osvaldo Condori	PTS	12	Apr 11, 1986	Salta, Argentina	Lost Argentine super-flyweight title
87	Win	81–4–2	Ramón Horacio Albers	PTS	10	Mar 14, 1986	Justiniano Posse, Argentina	
86	Win	80–4–2	Patricio Jesús Gil	PTS	10	Feb 28, 1986	Mar del Plata, Argentina	
85	Win	79–4–2	Ramón Horacio Albers	TKO	4 (10)	Dec 13, 1985	Justiniano Posse, Argentina	
84	Win	78–4–2	Juan Carlos Cortés	PTS	12	Nov 15, 1985	Villa María, Argentina	Retained Argentine super-flyweight title
83	Loss	77–4–2	Lucio Omar López	TKO	5 (10)	Jun 8, 1985	Estadio Luna Park, Buenos Aires, Argentina	
82	Win	77–3–2	Rubén Osvaldo Condori	PTS	10	May 17, 1985	Villa María, Argentina	
81	Win	76–3–2	Guillermo Manríquez	TKO	7 (10)	May 3, 1985	Mendoza, Argentina	
80	Draw	75–3–2	Juan Carlos Cortés	PTS	12	Mar 9, 1985	Comodoro Rivadavia, Argentina	Retained Argentine super-flyweight title
79	Win	75–3–1	Juan Alberto Ivalo	PTS	10	Feb 15, 1985	Mar del Plata, Argentina	
78	Win	74–3–1	Luis Adolfo Gerez	KO	4 (10)	Nov 23, 1984	Mendoza, Argentina	
77	Win	73–3–1	Rodolfo Rodríguez	PTS	10	Nov 9, 1984	Mendoza, Argentina	
76	Win	72–3–1	José Rufino Narváez	PTS	10	Oct 13, 1984	Estadio Luna Park, Buenos Aires, Argentina	
75	Win	71–3–1	Félix Ramón Colman	PTS	12	Sep 6, 1984	Mendoza, Argentina	Retained Argentine super-flyweight title
74	Win	70–3–1	Juan Carlos Cortés	MD	12	Apr 7, 1984	Estadio Luna Park, Buenos Aires, Argentina	Retained Argentine super-flyweight title
73	Win	69–3–1	Luis Adolfo Gerez	PTS	10	Mar 16, 1984	Mar del Plata, Argentina	
72	Win	68–3–1	Juan Alberto Ivalo	RTD	7 (10)	Feb 17, 1984	Mar del Plata, Argentina	
71	Win	67–3–1	Luis Alberto Ocampo	PTS	12	Nov 13, 1983	Posadas, Argentina	Won vacant Argentine super-flyweight title
70	Win	66–3–1	Alberto R. Pereyra	PTS	10	Sep 16, 1983	Corrientes, Argentina	
69	Loss	65–3–1	Juan Carlos Cortés	PTS	10	Aug 19, 1983	Córdoba, Argentina	
68	Win	65–2–1	Armando Brígido Romero	PTS	10	Jul 15, 1983	Córdoba, Argentina	
67	Win	64–2–1	Luis Adolfo Gerez	TKO	2 (10)	Jul 2, 1983	Estadio Luna Park, Buenos Aires, Argentina	
66	Win	63–2–1	Roberto Rogelio Condori	PTS	10	Jun 17, 1983	Rosario, Argentina	
65	Win	62–2–1	Armando Brígido Romero	PTS	10	Jun 3, 1983	Santa Rosa, Argentina	
64	Win	61–2–1	Félix Ramón Colman	PTS	10	May 12, 1983	Posadas, Argentina	
63	Win	60–2–1	Roberto Rogelio Condori	PTS	10	Apr 15, 1983	San Juan, Argentina	
62	Win	59–2–1	Raúl Cuevas	PTS	10	Mar 5, 1983	San Luis, Argentina	
61	Win	58–2–1	Adrián Daniel Román	PTS	10	Dec 11, 1982	Buenos Aires, Argentina	
60	Loss	57–2–1	Jiro Watanabe	RTD	9 (15), 3:00	Jul 29, 1982	Prefectural Gymnasium, Osaka, Japan	For WBA super-flyweight title
59	Win	57–1–1	Rodolfo Rodríguez	PTS	10	May 22, 1982	Estadio Luna Park, Buenos Aires, Argentina	
58	Win	56–1–1	José Froilán Nieva	KO	3 (10)	May 7, 1982	Mendoza, Argentina	
57	Win	55–1–1	José Antonio Gómez	PTS	10	Apr 23, 1982	San Miguel de Tucumán, Argentina	
56	Win	54–1–1	Héctor Ramón Barreto	TKO	10 (10)	Mar 26, 1982	Villa Carlos Paz, Argentina	
55	Loss	53–1–1	Rafael Pedroza	SD	15	Dec 5, 1981	Gimnasio Nuevo Panama, Panama City, Panama	Lost WBA super-flyweight title
54	Win	53–0–1	Sok-Chul Bae	TKO	8 (15), 2:38	Sep 12, 1981	Estadio Luna Park, Buenos Aires, Argentina	Won inaugural WBA super-flyweight title
53	Win	52–0–1	Héctor Ramón Barreto	PTS	10	Aug 14, 1981	Córdoba, Argentina	
52	Win	51–0–1	Roberto Rogelio Condori	TKO	9 (10)	Jul 24, 1981	La Banda, Argentina	
51	Win	50–0–1	Héctor Ramón Barreto	PTS	10	Jun 27, 1981	San Miguel de Tucumán, Argentina	
50	Win	49–0–1	Luis Adolfo Gerez	PTS	10	Jun 6, 1981	Córdoba, Argentina	
49	Win	48–0–1	Jackal Maruyama	TKO	11 (12), 2:11	May 9, 1981	Estadio Luna Park, Buenos Aires, Argentina	
48	Win	47–0–1	Félix Ramón Colman	PTS	10	Apr 3, 1981	Córdoba, Argentina	
47	Win	46–0–1	Jaime Miranda	TKO	8 (10)	Mar 21, 1981	Estadio Luna Park, Buenos Aires, Argentina	
46	Win	45–0–1	Ramón Rodríguez	TKO	6 (10)	Mar 6, 1981	Villa Carlos Paz, Argentina	
45	Win	44–0–1	Jaime Miranda	PTS	10	Feb 5, 1981	Villa María, Argentina	
44	Win	43–0–1	Jorge Vargas	KO	5 (10)	Jan 23, 1981	Villa Carlos Paz, Argentina	
43	Win	42–0–1	Ramón Rodríguez	TKO	8 (10)	Dec 11, 1980	Mendoza, Argentina	
42	Win	41–0–1	Alfonso López	PTS	10	Nov 22, 1980	Estadio Luna Park, Buenos Aires, Argentina	
41	Win	40–0–1	Rafael Pedroza	PTS	10	Oct 4, 1980	Estadio Luna Park, Buenos Aires, Argentina	
40	Win	39–0–1	Miguel Ángel Lazarte	PTS	10	Sep 19, 1980	Mendoza, Argentina	
39	Win	38–0–1	Ramón Rodríguez	TKO	10 (10)	Sep 5, 1980	Córdoba, Argentina	
38	Win	37–0–1	Héctor Velázquez	KO	2 (10)	Jun 27, 1980	San Juan, Argentina	
37	Win	36–0–1	Ramón Rodríguez	DQ	9 (10)	Jun 6, 1980	Villa María, Argentina	
36	Win	35–0–1	Jorge Aguilar	PTS	10	May 16, 1980	Mendoza, Argentina	
35	Win	34–0–1	Rodolfo Rodríguez	PTS	10	Apr 19, 1980	Estadio Luna Park, Buenos Aires, Argentina	
34	Win	33–0–1	Juan Aravena	TKO	7 (10)	Apr 3, 1980	Villa María, Argentina	
33	Win	32–0–1	Rigoberto Marcano	PTS	10	Mar 8, 1980	Estadio Luna Park, Buenos Aires, Argentina	
32	Win	31–0–1	José Ricard	KO	6 (10)	Feb 8, 1980	Mar del Plata, Argentina	
31	Win	30–0–1	Miguel Ángel Lazarte	PTS	10	Dec 6, 1979	Villa María, Argentina	
30	Win	29–0–1	John Meza	KO	3 (10)	Nov 16, 1979	Mendoza, Argentina	
29	Win	28–0–1	Santos Laciar	PTS	10	Nov 3, 1979	Estadio Luna Park, Buenos Aires, Argentina	
28	Win	27–0–1	Paulo Ribeiro	TKO	8 (10)	Oct 19, 1979	Mendoza, Argentina	
27	Win	26–0–1	Jose Cardozo	KO	3 (10)	Oct 5, 1979	Villa María, Argentina	
26	Win	25–0–1	Hector Velazquez	PTS	10	Sep 7, 1979	Villa María, Argentina	
25	Draw	24–0–1	Jose Rufino Narvaez	PTS	10	Aug 24, 1979	Mendoza, Argentina	
24	Win	24–0	Carlos Huilli	KO	3 (10)	Jul 6, 1979	Villa María, Argentina	
23	Win	23–0	Jose Luis Lopez	PTS	10	May 3, 1979	Mendoza, Argentina	
22	Win	22–0	Esteban Apolinario Bustos	PTS	10	Apr 18, 1979	Villa María, Argentina	
21	Win	21–0	Miguel Angel Lazarte	PTS	10	Feb 2, 1979	Mar del Plata, Argentina	
20	Win	20–0	Angel Lois Fernandez	PTS	10	Dec 16, 1978	Estadio Luna Park, Buenos Aires, Argentina	
19	Win	19–0	Carlos Ramon Escalante	PTS	10	Nov 3, 1978	Villa María, Argentina	
18	Win	18–0	Jose Roque Ibiris	PTS	10	Oct 21, 1978	Estadio Luna Park, Buenos Aires, Argentina	
17	Win	17–0	Juan Carlos Rios	PTS	10	Sep 14, 1978	Villa María, Argentina	
16	Win	16–0	Angel Lois Fernandez	PTS	10	Sep 1, 1978	Mendoza, Argentina	
15	Win	15–0	Luis Adolfo Gerez	PTS	10	Aug 4, 1978	Villa María, Argentina	
14	Win	14–0	Hugo Jose Emer	PTS	10	Jul 7, 1978	Villa María, Argentina	
13	Win	13–0	Hector Ramon Barreto	PTS	10	May 12, 1978	Mendoza, Argentina	
12	Win	12–0	Enrique Hector Navarro	PTS	10	Apr 21, 1978	Mendoza, Argentina	
11	Win	11–0	Reynaldo Romero	PTS	10	Apr 7, 1978	Villa María, Argentina	
10	Win	10–0	Manuel Enrique Quinteros	KO	3 (10)	Dec 20, 1977	Godoy Cruz, Argentina	
9	Win	9–0	Felipe Santiago Rojas	PTS	10	Dec 2, 1977	Villa María, Argentina	
8	Win	8–0	Jose Martin Devia	RTD	5 (10)	Nov 18, 1977	Mendoza, Argentina	
7	Win	7–0	Alberto Orlando Martin	PTS	10	Nov 4, 1977	Villa María, Argentina	
6	Win	6–0	Hector Hugo Lopez	PTS	8	Oct 7, 1977	Mendoza, Argentina	
5	Win	5–0	Rodolfo Trujillo	TKO	2 (8)	Sep 2, 1977	Mendoza, Argentina	
4	Win	4–0	Carlos Ramon Baez	PTS	8	Aug 12, 1977	Mendoza, Argentina	
3	Win	3–0	Manuel Enrique Quinteros	PTS	8	Jul 15, 1977	Mendoza, Argentina	
2	Win	2–0	Felix Humberto Ruarte	PTS	6	Apr 27, 1977	Mendoza, Argentina	
1	Win	1–0	Raul Anchagna	TKO	5 (6)	Dec 1, 1976	Mendoza, Argentina	

== See also ==
- List of world super-flyweight boxing champions

Sporting positions
Regional boxing titles
New title	Argentine super-flyweight champion November 13, 1983 – April 11, 1986	Succeeded by Ruben Condori
New title	South American super-flyweight champion November 14, 1986 – 1988; Vacated	Vacant Title next held by Ramon Norberto Retamozo
Vacant Title last held by Ruben Condori	Argentine super-flyweight champion October 15, 1988 – 1989; Stripped	Vacant Title next held by Ramon Norberto Retamozo
World boxing titles
Inaugural champion	WBA super-flyweight champion September 12, 1981 – December 5, 1981	Succeeded by Rafael Pedroza
