= Johnny Aba =

Papua New Guinean boxer (born 1956)

Personal information
- Nationality: Papua New Guinean
- Born: Johnny Aba; 3 March 1956 (age 70) Bougainville Island, Papua New Guinea
- Weight: feather/super feather/lightweight

Boxing career

Boxing record
- Total fights: 37
- Wins: 31 (KO 14)
- Losses: 3 (KO 2)
- Draws: 3

Johnny Aba (born 3 March 1956) is a Papua New Guinean professional feather/super feather/lightweight boxer of the 1970s and 1980s who won the Papua New Guinea featherweight title, Papua New Guinea lightweight title, and Commonwealth super featherweight title, and was a challenger for the World Boxing Association (WBA) World featherweight title, against Eusebio Pedroza, his professional fighting weight varied from 124 1/2 lb (56.5 kg; 8 st 12.5 lb), i.e. featherweight to 131 1/2 lb (59.6 kg; 9 st 5.5 lb), i.e. lightweight.
