= Patricia Ford =

Patricia Ford may refer to:

- Patricia Ford (politician) (1921–1995), Member of Parliament from Northern Ireland
- Patricia A. Ford (born 1955), American physician

== See also ==
- Patricia Forde (born c. 1960), former director of the Galway Arts Festival and children's author
- Pat Ford (disambiguation)
