= Juan Laporte =

Puerto Rican boxer (born 1959)

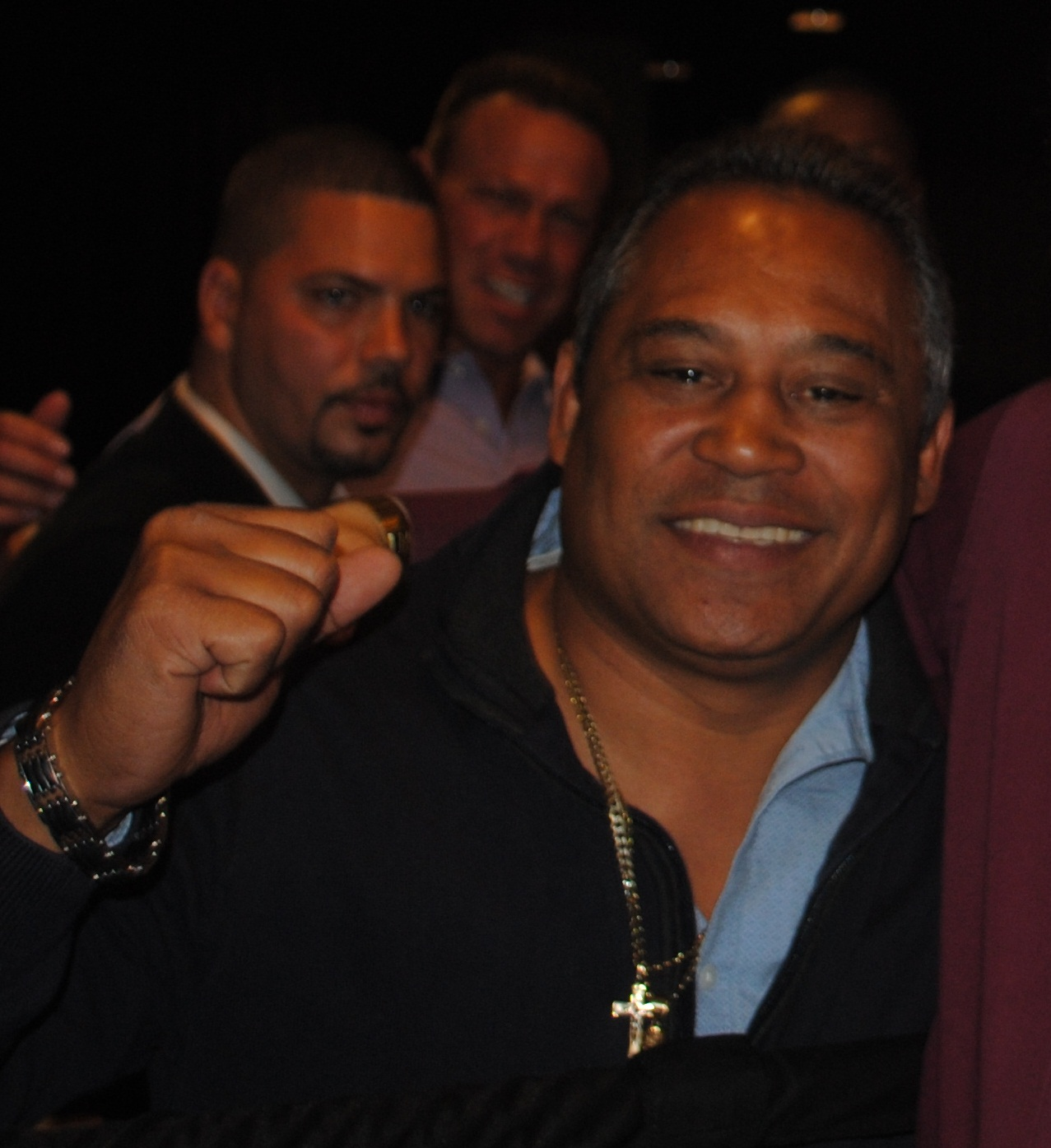
- Juan LaPorte ringside during a boxing card in Queens, New York, May 4, 2013

Personal information
- Nationality: (Puerto Rico) Puerto Rican
- Born: Juan La Porte; November 24, 1959 (age 66) Guayama, Puerto Rico
- Height: 5 ft 5 in (165 cm)
- Weight: Featherweight; Super featherweight; Light welterweight

Boxing career
- Reach: 68 in (173 cm)
- Stance: Orthodox

Boxing record
- Total fights: 57
- Wins: 40
- Win by KO: 22
- Losses: 16
- Draws: 1
- No contests: 0

Juan Laporte, also known as Juan La Porte (born November 24, 1959) is a former boxer who was born in Guayama, Puerto Rico. In 1982, La Porte won the vacant WBC featherweight title, forcing undefeated Colombian Mario "Martillo" Miranda to quit on his stool. Throughout his 22-year-long career, La Porte fought some of the greatest fighters of each decade, including Hall of Fame members Salvador Sanchez, Eusebio Pedroza, Azumah Nelson, Wilfredo Gomez, Barry McGuigan, Kostya Tszyu & Julio Cesar Chavez Sr. He retired in 1999 with a record of 40–16, with many of his losses being highly competitive, and sometimes controversial, affairs.

== Amateur career ==
Juan Laporte won the 1976 112 lb New York Golden Gloves Sub-Novice Championship. He defeated Long Island's Ricky Brown in the finals. Laporte was defeated by Joseph Nieto of the Police Athletic Leagues Lynch Center in the 1977 118 lb Open Championship. Laporte trained at the Lunar Boys Club in Brooklyn, New York. He had an amateur record of 29–6, according to the March 1983 Ring Magazine.

== Professional career ==
Juan Laporte moved to New York at a young age, where he grew up into a known contender, but one that many boxing critics didn't consider to be material to become a world champion earlier in his career.

Laporte built a number of wins, combined with 1 loss, including a 7-round knockout of Jean Lapointe. But he still was an unknown when given his first chance at a world championship in December 1980 in El Paso, Texas.

He met legendary Mexican world Featherweight champion Salvador Sánchez there. Laporte made Sanchez work hard and won a handful of rounds. He lost to Sanchez by a 15-round unanimous decision.

Laporte then fought future world champion Rocky Lockridge in 1981 at Las Vegas, scoring a second-round knockout to become the United States Featherweight champion.

Given a second title shot, this time by the WBA, Laporte met the also legendary world featherweight champion Eusebio Pedroza in 1982, losing a close and controversial unanimous decision, after having Pedroza hurt in round two. The fight was so close that WBC president José Sulaimán decided to give Laporte a rematch vs Sanchez for the World Boxing Council's world title.

This rematch wasn't going to happen, because Sanchez died in a car accident the morning of August 12, in Mexico City. Then, the WBC decided to put Laporte vs. Colombian Mario Miranda for the vacant world title in a fight held at the Madison Square Garden. Laporte dropped Miranda in the tenth round and Miranda quit on his stool before the start of the 11th. Juan Laporte, the tough kid from New York who couldn't figure to become a world champ versus the legendary champions of the day, had become a world champion.

Around this time, Laporte was sponsored by the American jeans brand, Sasson, sporting their name and logo on his boxing trunks (shorts) during his fights.

Laporte defended his title twice, vs. Ruben Castillo and Johnny De La Rosa, both 12 rounds decision wins, then lost it to another Puerto Rican world champion, the legendary Wilfredo Gómez.

In 1985, he went to Ireland, where he lost a ten-round decision to future world champion Barry McGuigan.

In 1986, Laporte fought Julio César Chávez at the Madison Square Garden, but he lost a unanimous decision in a contest for Chavez's WBC world Jr. Lightweight title.

His career went on and off after that day, and in 1989, his son died in a drowning accident. Laporte buried his title belt along with his son.

Upon hearing this, Sulaiman sent him a new world title belt to show him support and respect from the boxing community. Around that era, on April 29, 1989, Laporte fought on the WBO's inaugural world Junior Lightweight championship bout, losing by a 12 rounds unanimous decision for the vacant title to his countryman, John John Molina, 18-2 before their fight, at the Roberto Clemente Coliseum in San Juan. Laporte lost another disputed decision later on, this time to former world Jr Welterweight champion Billy Costello in 1999, and then finally retired from boxing.

== Life after boxing ==
He has retired to his native Puerto Rico and dedicates his time to train children of all ages in his spare time.

== See also ==
- List of featherweight boxing champions
- List of Puerto Rican boxing world champions
- List of Puerto Ricans
- French immigration to Puerto Rico

Achievements
Regional boxing titles
Vacant Title last held by Gustavo Salgado	USBA featherweight champion August 22, 1981 – September 15, 1982; Won WBC title	Vacant Title next held by Refugio Rojas
Preceded by Nicky Perez	NABF super featherweight champion August 13, 1998 – October 13, 1990; Lost bid for WBC title	Vacant Title next held by Gabriel Ruelas
World boxing titles
Vacant Title last held by Salvador Sánchez	WBC featherweight champion September 15, 1982 - March 31, 1984	Succeeded by Wilfredo Gómez
