= Jeff Chandler (boxer) =

American boxer

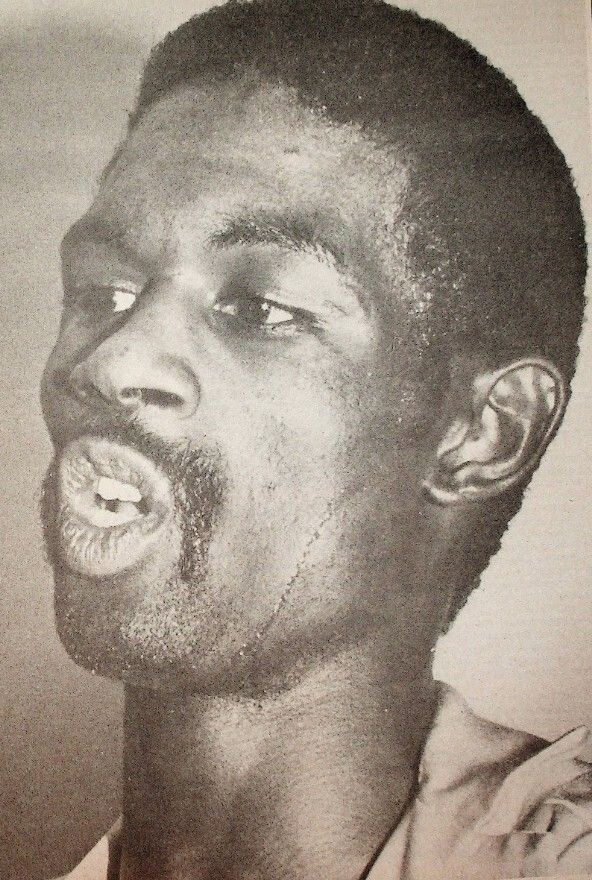
- Chandler c. 1982

Personal information
- Nickname: Joltin
- Born: September 3, 1956 (age 69) Philadelphia, Pennsylvania, U.S.
- Height: 5 ft 7 in (170 cm)
- Weight: Bantamweight

Boxing career
- Reach: 71 1/2 in (182 cm)
- Stance: Orthodox

Boxing record
- Total fights: 37
- Wins: 33
- Win by KO: 18
- Losses: 2
- Draws: 2

"Joltin'" Jeff Chandler (born September 3, 1956, in Philadelphia, Pennsylvania) is a former boxer. Chandler reigned as the Lineal and WBA world Bantamweight Champion from November 1980 to April 1984.

== Professional boxing career ==
The 5'7" (67 inches - 1.70 metres) tall Philadelphian began his professional career with a four-round draw in 1976 after only two amateur bouts. Chandler then began a four-year string of victories culminating in a challenge for the world's lineal and WBA 118-pound championship held by Julian Solís. On November 14, 1980, Chandler won the title by a fourteenth-round knockout in Miami, becoming the first American fighter to hold the bantamweight crown in over 30 years.

Chandler's first defence was against former champion Jorge Luján, winning on points in fifteen rounds. He then travelled to Japan to face Asian champion Eljiro Murata, and although he was almost floored in the early rounds, Chandler came back to hold his title with a draw. Many ringside observers felt Chandler deserved a clear points victory. With his status in the boxing world rising, Chandler followed this up with a repeat victory over Solis, this time in seven rounds. Chandler finished 1981 against Murata, earning a thirteenth-round knockout rematch win.

In March 1982, Chandler faced the only opponent who ever defeated him as an amateur, fellow Philadelphian Johnny Carter. The tables were turned this time as he scored a sixth-round knockout on national television. Soon after, Chandler was sidelined by an injury sustained in a street-fight. During a traffic altercation in Philadelphia, he was stabbed on the right shoulder with a broken bottle, leaving a distinctive circular scar, but doing no permanent damage. Chandler went on to defend his title by beating Miguel Iriarte before finishing 1982.

In 1983, Chandler ventured into the Super bantamweight ranks, winning a ten-round decision over Hector Cortez. He then faced tough Angelino Oscar Muniz in another non-title bout. Muniz took the fight to Chandler, winning narrowly on points over ten rounds, Chandler's first defeat in the professional ranks. He defended once more against Murata (another knockout, in the tenth round), then faced Muniz again, this time with the title on the line. A severe cut over Muniz's eye brought a stoppage in the seventh round, enabling Chandler to retain his belt by a seventh-round technical knockout.

On April 7, 1984, Chandler faced the undefeated contender Richie Sandoval. This time his skills were not enough to stop an eager young foe. Sandoval took the title with a fifteenth-round knockout. This turned out to be Chandler's last fight. He elected to have surgery on cataracts that had been diagnosed the year before. Rather than risk blindness, Chandler retired from boxing.

He finished his career with a record of 33 wins, 2 losses and 2 draws. Jeff Chandler provided boxing fans with many memorable performances. In 2000, he was elected to the International Boxing Hall of Fame at Canastota, New York.

== Professional boxing record ==
37 fights	33 wins	2 losses
By knockout	18	1
By decision	15	1
Draws	2	

No.	Result	Record	Opponent	Type	Round, time	Date	Location	Notes
37	Loss	33–2–2	Richie Sandoval	TKO	15 (15)	Apr 7, 1984	Sands Atlantic City, Atlantic City, New Jersey, U.S.	Lost WBA and The Ring bantamweight titles
36	Win	33–1–2	Oscar Muniz	TKO	7 (15)	Dec 17, 1983	Sands Atlantic City, Atlantic City, New Jersey, U.S.	Retained WBA and The Ring bantamweight titles
35	Win	32–1–2	Eijiro Murata	TKO	10 (15)	Sep 11, 1983	Korakuen Hall, Tokyo, Japan	Retained WBA and The Ring bantamweight titles
34	Loss	31–1–2	Oscar Muniz	SD	10	Jul 23, 1983	Sands Atlantic City, Atlantic City, New Jersey, U.S.	
33	Win	31–0–2	Hector Cortez	UD	10	May 22, 1983	Sands Atlantic City, Atlantic City, New Jersey, U.S.	
32	Win	30–0–2	Gaby Canizales	UD	15	Mar 13, 1983	Resorts International, Atlantic City, New Jersey, U.S.	Retained WBA and The Ring bantamweight titles
31	Win	29–0–2	Miguel Iriarte	TKO	9 (15)	Oct 27, 1982	Resorts International, Atlantic City, New Jersey, U.S.	Retained WBA and The Ring bantamweight titles
30	Win	28–0–2	Johnny Carter	TKO	6 (15)	Mar 27, 1982	Civic Center, Philadelphia, Pennsylvania, U.S.	Retained WBA and The Ring bantamweight titles
29	Win	27–0–2	Eijiro Murata	TKO	13 (15)	Dec 10, 1981	Sands Atlantic City, Atlantic City, New Jersey, U.S.	Retained WBA and The Ring bantamweight titles
28	Win	26–0–2	Julian Solís	KO	7 (15)	Jul 25, 1981	Resorts International, Atlantic City, New Jersey, U.S.	Retained WBA and The Ring bantamweight titles
27	Draw	25–0–2	Eijiro Murata	SD	15	Apr 5, 1981	Ryōgoku Kokugikan, Tokyo, Japan	Retained WBA and The Ring bantamweight titles
26	Win	25–0–1	Jorge Luján	UD	15	Jan 31, 1981	Franklin Plaza Hotel, Philadelphia, Pennsylvania, U.S.	Retained WBA and The Ring bantamweight titles
25	Win	24–0–1	Julian Solís	TKO	14 (15)	Nov 14, 1980	Jai-Alai Fronton, Miami, Florida, U.S.	Won WBA and The Ring bantamweight titles
24	Win	23–0–1	Gustavo Martinez	KO	8 (10)	Jul 31, 1980	Resorts International Rutland Room, Atlantic City, New Jersey, U.S.	
23	Win	22–0–1	Gilberto Villacana	RTD	4 (10)	Jul 12, 1980	Resorts International Hotel & Casino, Superstar Theatre, Atlantic City, New Jersey, U.S.	
22	Win	21–0–1	Andres Hernandez	UD	12	Mar 29, 1980	Resorts International, Atlantic City, New Jersey, U.S.	Retained USBA and NABF bantamweight titles
21	Win	20–0–1	Javier Flores	TKO	10 (12)	Feb 1, 1980	Spectrum, Philadelphia, Pennsylvania, U.S.	Won NABF bantamweight title
20	Win	19–0–1	Francisco Alvarado	KO	7 (10)	Dec 4, 1979	Forum, Upper Darby, Pennsylvania, U.S.	
19	Win	18–0–1	Baby Kid Chocolate	TKO	9 (12)	Sep 26, 1979	Forum, Upper Darby, Pennsylvania, U.S.	Won vacant USBA bantamweight title
18	Win	17–0–1	Alberto Cruz	TKO	3 (10)	Jul 31, 1979	Steel Pier Arena, Atlantic City, New Jersey, U.S.	
17	Win	16–0–1	Justo Garcia	UD	10	May 14, 1979	Spectrum, Philadelphia, Pennsylvania, U.S.	
16	Win	15–0–1	Davey Vasquez	UD	10	Apr 3, 1979	Spectrum, Philadelphia, Pennsylvania, U.S.	
15	Win	14–0–1	Rafael Gandarilla	TKO	9 (10)	Dec 5, 1978	Spectrum, Philadelphia, Pennsylvania, U.S.	
14	Win	13–0–1	Andre Torres	UD	10	Oct 24, 1978	Spectrum, Philadelphia, Pennsylvania, U.S.	
13	Win	12–0–1	Sergio Reyes	UD	8	Aug 24, 1978	Spectrum, Philadelphia, Pennsylvania, U.S.	
12	Win	11–0–1	Roque Moreno	TKO	5 (8)	Jun 19, 1978	Spectrum, Philadelphia, Pennsylvania, U.S.	
11	Win	10–0–1	Jose Luis Garcia	KO	5 (6)	May 24, 1978	Spectrum, Philadelphia, Pennsylvania, U.S.	
10	Win	9–0–1	Tony Hernandez	KO	2 (6)	Mar 14, 1978	Spectrum, Philadelphia, Pennsylvania, U.S.	
9	Win	8–0–1	Tony Reed	UD	8	Oct 25, 1977	The Blue Horizon, Philadelphia. Pennsylvania, U.S.	
8	Win	7–0–1	John Glover	PTS	6	Jun 15, 1977	Wagner Ballroom, Philadelphia, Pennsylvania, U.S.	
7	Win	6–0–1	Fernando Sanchez	PTS	6	Feb 21, 1977	Spectrum, Philadelphia, Pennsylvania, U.S.	
6	Win	5–0–1	Tony Stokes	PTS	4	Nov 30, 1976	Spectrum, Philadelphia, Pennsylvania, U.S.	
5	Win	4–0–1	Larry Huffin	TKO	3 (4)	Oct 14, 1976	Fournier Hall, Wilmington, Delaware, U.S.	
4	Win	3–0–1	John Glover	PTS	4	Aug 6, 1976	Convention Hall, Atlantic City, New Jersey, U.S.	
3	Win	2–0–1	Michael Frazier	PTS	4	Jun 8, 1976	The Blue Horizon, Philadelphia. Pennsylvania, U.S.	
2	Win	1–0–1	Chico Vivas	PTS	4	Apr 13, 1976	The Blue Horizon, Philadelphia. Pennsylvania, U.S.	
1	Draw	0–0–1	Mike Dowling	PTS	4	Feb 25, 1976	Catholic Youth Center, Scranton, Pennsylvania, U.S.	

== See also ==
- List of world bantamweight boxing champions

Sporting positions
Regional boxing titles
Vacant Title last held by Roberto Rubaldino	NABF bantamweight champion February 1, 1980 – 1980; Vacated	Vacant Title next held by Oscar Muniz
World boxing titles
Preceded by Julian Solís	WBA bantamweight champion November 14, 1980 – April 7, 1984	Succeeded by Richie Sandoval
Preceded by Julian Solís	The Ring bantamweight champion November 14, 1980 – April 7, 1984	Succeeded by Richie Sandoval
