= Eusebio Pedroza =

Panamanian boxer (1956–2019)

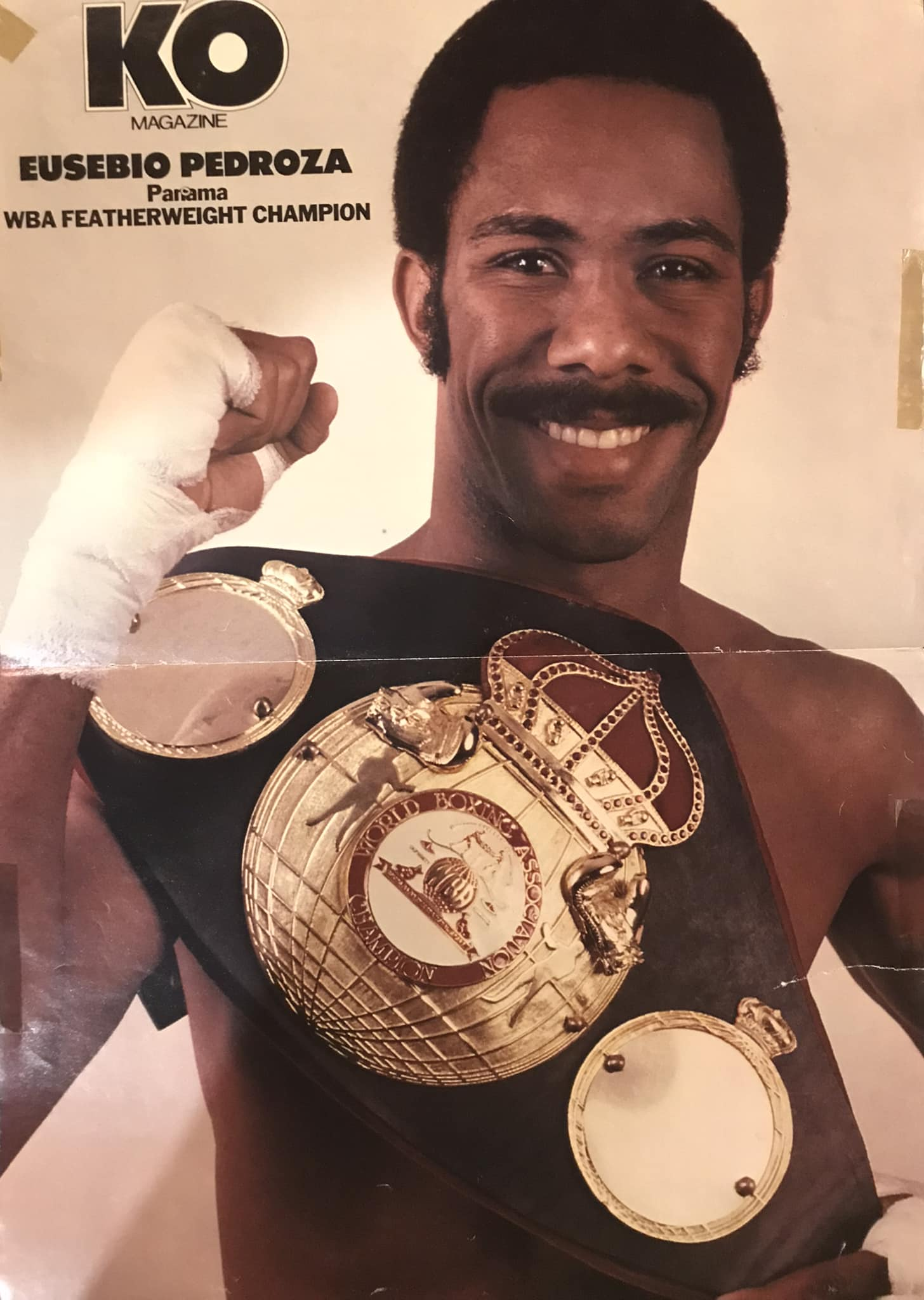
- Pedroza c. 1984

Personal information
- Nickname: El Alacrán
- Born: Eusebio Pedroza Silva; March 2, 1956 Panama City, Panama
- Died: March 1, 2019 (aged 62) Panama City, Panama
- Height: 173 cm (5 ft 8 in)
- Weight: Bantamweight; Featherweight

Boxing career
- Reach: 174 cm (69 in)
- Stance: Orthodox

Boxing record
- Total fights: 49
- Wins: 41
- Win by KO: 25
- Losses: 6
- Draws: 1
- No contests: 1

Eusebio Pedroza (March 2, 1956 – March 1, 2019) was a Panamanian boxer who held the WBA and lineal featherweight championship from 1978 to 1985, having defended the title against 18 different contenders, more than any other boxer in featherweight history. His cousin, Rafael Pedroza, was a world champion also, in the junior bantamweight division, although Rafael's reign as world champion was short-lived. Eusebio Pedroza died one day before his 63rd birthday.

== Biography ==
Pedroza started out as a professional boxer on December 1, 1973, with a four-round knockout win over Julio Garcia. His first 15 bouts were all in Panama. He went 14–1 over that span of fights, including a win over Jacinto Fuentes, a boxer who would later draw and lose to Wilfredo Gómez. His one defeat over that period of his career came to Alfonso Pérez by a knockout in three.

For fight number 16, Pedroza went to Mexicali, Mexico, in the last week of March 1976 to challenge WBA world bantamweight champion Alfonso Zamora for the world title. In his first championship try, Pedroza suffered his second loss, being knocked out in two rounds. After returning to Panama, he beat Pablo Jimenez by a decision in ten, then lost to Oscar Arnal in Venezuela by a knockout in six. He would not lose again for nine years.

Pedroza won three fights in 1977, two by knockout, and then, in April 1978, the WBA featherweight champion, Cecilio Lastra of Spain, travelled to Panama to defend his title on April 18 against Pedroza, who knocked him out in round 13 to become the new WBA featherweight champion.

Pedroza, during the next seven years, travelled the world to defend his title. Among 18 fighters Pedroza defended the title against were Enrique Solis in Puerto Rico, in a 15-round decision win, former world champion Royal Kobayashi (in Japan), knocked out in 14, Sa Wang Kim (in South Korea), knocked out in 8, former three-time world champion and fellow Hall of Famer Rubén Olivares, who lasted 12, Johnny Aba (in Port Moresby, Papua New Guinea), who lost in 11, future world junior lightweight champion Rocky Lockridge, who went the distance with Pedroza in New Jersey and in Italy but lost by decision both times, Carlos Piñango (in Venezuela), knocked out in seven, Juan Laporte by decision, Jose Caba in Italy, also by decision, and Bernard Taylor in North Carolina by the way of draw. He also defended in his home country many times during that span, including a decision win over countryman and former WBA world Bantamweight champion Jorge Lujan, and became a household name in Latin America, his face appearing on the cover and posters of Ring En Español and Guantes magazines multiple times. Pedroza finally lost his title in England, being defeated by Ireland's Barry McGuigan in London in a 15-round decision.

During Pedroza's reign, talks surfaced of a unification bout against World Boxing Council and lineal featherweight champion Salvador Sanchez. These hopes were dashed when Sanchez died in an automobile accident in 1982. By virtue of his win over LaPorte, who succeeded Sanchez as WBC champion, Pedroza was recognized as the new lineal featherweight champion.

Between 1986 and 1992, Pedroza tried various comebacks, going 3–2 in total on those comeback attempts.

He retired with a record of 42 wins, 6 losses and one draw, with one no contest, and 25 wins by knockout. He is a member of the International Boxing Hall Of Fame.

Pedroza was one of a few whose fights inspired young Mike Tyson.

== Professional boxing record ==
49 fights	41 wins	6 losses
By knockout	25	3
By decision	16	3
Draws	1	
No contests	1	

No.	Result	Record	Opponent	Type	Round, time	Date	Location	Notes
49	Loss	41–6–1 (1)	Mauro Gutierrez	SD	10	21 Nov 1992	Holy Redeemer HS Gymnasium, Detroit, Michigan, U.S.	
48	Win	41–5–1 (1)	Tomas Quinones	KO	3 (8)	14 Mar 1992	Espace Piscine, Antibes, France	
47	Win	40–5–1 (1)	Jorge Romero	UD	10	15 Dec 1991	Convention Center, Miami Beach Florida, U.S.	
46	Win	39–5–1 (1)	Tomas Rodriguez	UD	10	25 Oct 1991	Mahi Temple Shrine Auditorium, Miami, Florida, U.S.	
45	Loss	38–5–1 (1)	Edgar Castro	SD	10	9 Aug 1986	Gimnasio Nuevo Panama, Panama City, Panama	
44	Loss	38–4–1 (1)	Barry McGuigan	UD	15	8 Jun 1985	Loftus Road Stadium, Shepherd's Bush, London, United Kingdom	Lost WBA and The Ring featherweight titles
43	Win	38–3–1 (1)	Jorge Lujan	UD	15	2 Feb 1985	Gimnasio Nuevo Panama, Panama City, Panama	Retained WBA and The Ring featherweight titles
42	Win	37–3–1 (1)	Gerald Hayes	TKO	10 (10)	23 Jun 1984	Atlapa Convention Centre, Panama City, Panama	
41	Win	36–3–1 (1)	Angel Mayor	UD	15	27 May 1984	Hotel del Lago Casino, Maracaibo, Venezuela	Retained WBA and The Ring featherweight titles
40	Win	35–3–1 (1)	Jose Caba	UD	15	24 Oct 1983	Palasport, Saint-Vincent, Italy	Retained WBA and The Ring featherweight titles
39	Win	34–3–1 (1)	Rocky Lockridge	UD	15	24 Apr 1983	San Remo, Italy	Retained WBA and The Ring featherweight titles
38	Draw	33–3–1 (1)	Bernard Taylor	SD	15	16 Oct 1982	Charlotte Coliseum, Charlotte, North Carolina, U.S.	Retained WBA and The Ring featherweight titles
37	NC	33–3 (1)	Rudy Alpizar	NC	2 (10)	17 Jul 1982	Gimnasio Nuevo Panama, Panama City, Panama	
36	Win	33–3	Juan Laporte	UD	15	24 Jan 1982	Sands Casino Hotel, Atlantic City, New Jersey, U.S.	Retained WBA featherweight title
35	Win	32–3	Bashew Sibaca	KO	5 (15)	5 Dec 1981	Gimnasio Nuevo Panama, Panama City, Panama	Retained WBA featherweight title
34	Win	31–3	Carlos Pinango	KO	7 (15)	1 Aug 1981	El Poliedro, Caracas, Venezuela	Retained WBA featherweight title
33	Win	30–3	Patrick Ford	KO	13 (15)	14 Feb 1981	Gimnasio Nuevo Panama, Panama City, Panama	Retained WBA featherweight title
32	Win	29–3	Raul Silva	KO	5 (10)	17 Jan 1981	Gimnasio Nuevo Panama, Panama City, Panama	
31	Win	28–3	Rocky Lockridge	SD	15	4 Oct 1980	Legends Resort & Country Club, Vernon Township, New Jersey, U.S.	Retained WBA featherweight title
30	Win	27–3	Sa Wang Kim	KO	8 (15)	20 Jul 1980	Jangchung Gymnasium, Seoul, South Korea	Retained WBA featherweight title
29	Win	26–3	Juan Domingo Malvarez	KO	9 (15)	29 Mar 1980	Gimnasio Nuevo Panama, Panama City, Panama	Retained WBA featherweight title
28	Win	25–3	Spider Nemoto	UD	15	22 Jan 1980	Korakuen Hall, Tokyo, Japan	Retained WBA featherweight title
27	Win	24–3	Johnny Aba	TKO	11 (15)	17 Nov 1979	Sir Hubert Murray Stadium, Port Moresby, Papua New Guinea	Retained WBA featherweight title
26	Win	23–3	Rubén Olivares	TKO	12 (15)	21 Jul 1979	Sam Houston Coliseum, Houston, Texas, U.S.	Retained WBA featherweight title
25	Win	22–3	Hector Carrasquilla	TKO	11 (15)	7 Apr 1979	Gimnasio Nuevo Panama, Panama City, Panama	Retained WBA featherweight title
24	Win	21–3	Royal Kobayashi	RTD	13 (15)	9 Jan 1979	Korakuen Hall, Tokyo, Japan	Retained WBA featherweight title
23	Win	20–3	Enrique Solis	UD	15	27 Nov 1978	Roberto Clemente Coliseum, San Juan, Puerto Rico	Retained WBA featherweight title
22	Win	19–3	Ernesto Herrera	TKO	12 (15)	2 Jul 1978	Gimnasio Nuevo Panama, Panama City, Panama	Retained WBA featherweight title
21	Win	18–3	Cecilio Lastra	TKO	13 (15)	15 Apr 1978	Gimnasio Nuevo Panama, Panama City, Panama	Won WBA featherweight title
20	Win	17–3	Rodolfo Francis	TKO	7 (10)	26 Nov 1977	Gimnasio Nuevo Panama, Panama City, Panama	
19	Win	16–3	Reynaldo Hidalgo	TKO	9 (10)	14 May 1977	Gimnasio Nuevo Panama, Panama City, Panama	
18	Win	15–3	Jose Santana	UD	10	2 Apr 1977	Gimnasio Nuevo Panama, Panama City, Panama	
17	Loss	14–3	Oscar Arnal	KO	6 (10)	11 Jul 1976	Caracas, Venezuela	
16	Loss	14–2	Alfonso Zamora	KO	2 (15)	3 Apr 1976	Plaza de Toros Calafia, Mexicali, Mexico	For WBA Bantamweight title
15	Win	14–1	Orlando Amores	TKO	9 (10)	15 Nov 1975	Gimnasio Nuevo Panama, Panama City, Panama	
14	Win	13–1	Guillermo Almengot	TKO	7 (10)	19 Jul 1975	Gimnasio Nuevo Panama, Panama City, Panama	
13	Win	12–1	Marcos Britton	KO	4 (10)	26 Apr 1975	Gimnasio Nuevo Panama, Panama City, Panama	
12	Win	11–1	Benicio Sosa	UD	10	21 Mar 1975	Feria de San Jose, David, Panama	
11	Win	10–1	Ernesto Mathias	UD	10	22 Feb 1975	Gimnasio Nuevo Panama, Panama City, Panama	
10	Loss	9–1	Alfonso Pérez	KO	3 (10)	18 Jan 1975	Gimnasio Nuevo Panama, Panama City, Panama	
9	Win	9–0	Senen Rios	TKO	6 (10)	14 Sep 1974	Gimnasio Nuevo Panama, Panama City, Panama	
8	Win	8–0	Vicente Worrel Jr	KO	1 (10)	20 Jul 1974	Gimnasio Nuevo Panama, Panama City, Panama	
7	Win	7–0	Ernesto Davis	KO	1 (8)	14 Jun 1974	Gimnasio Neco de la Guardia, Panama City, Panama	
6	Win	6–0	Ricardo Vega	TKO	2 (6)	4 May 1974	Gimnasio Neco de la Guardia, Panama City, Panama	
5	Win	5–0	Jacinto Fuentes	PTS	4	30 Mar 1974	Gimnasio Neco de la Guardia, Panama City, Panama	
4	Win	4–0	Loitolier Chacon	KO	1 (4)	2 Mar 1974	Gimnasio Neco de la Guardia, Panama City, Panama	
3	Win	3–0	Jorge Bernal	PTS	4	8 Feb 1974	Gimnasio Neco de la Guardia, Panama City, Panama	
2	Win	2–0	Jose Santana	UD	4	22 Dec 1973	Gimnasio Neco de la Guardia, Panama City, Panama	
1	Win	1–0	Julio Garcia	TKO	4 (4)	1 Dec 1973	Gimnasio Escuela Normal, Santiago de Veraguas, Panama	Professional Debut

== See also ==
- List of featherweight boxing champions

Sporting positions
World boxing titles
Preceded by Cecilio Lastra	WBA featherweight Champion; April 15, 1978 - June 8, 1985	Succeeded by Barry McGuigan
Vacant Title last held by Salvador Sánchez	The Ring featherweight champion September 22, 1982 - June 8, 1985	Succeeded by Barry McGuigan
