= Patrick Ford (boxer) =

Guyanese Boxer

Patrick Ford (17 December 1955 – 13 November 2011) born Patrick Forde, was a Guyanese and British Commonwealth Featherweight champion boxer who challenged twice for the world featherweight title, and who was credited with paving the way for Guyanese professional boxers that followed. Ford won sixteen consecutive professional bouts at the start of his career in Guyana, Trinidad and Tobago, and Nigeria, between 1978 and 1980. One of the opponents he knocked out, unbeaten Cecil Ferandez, died after getting knocked out by Ford in the ring in Georgetown, Guyana in 1979.

== World Title challenges ==
After stopping Eddie Ndukwu in August 1980 to win the Commonwealth (British Empire) featherweight title, on September 13, 1980, Ford lost a majority decision to Salvador Sanchez for the World Boxing Council featherweight title in San Antonio, Texas. One judge had the bout a draw at 145–145. On February 14, 1981, Ford was knocked out by Eusebio Pedroza at 3:04 of round 13 in a failed attempt to win the World Boxing Association featherweight title. After losing his next two fights, Ford retired. Ford won three comeback fights in Guyana between 1985 and 1987, finishing his career with a ten-round decision over Albert Brown on May 31, 1987.

== Later life as trainer ==
Ford was a sergeant in the Guyanese Army, and also a licensed plumber. Ford lived in New York City after retirement, training amateur and professional boxers at Gleason's Gym in Brooklyn, New York. He died from complications after a heart attack at Kings County Hospital Center on November 13, 2011.
