= List of United States national amateur boxing bantamweight champions =

Below is a list of United States national Amateur Boxing Bantamweight Champions, also known as United States Amateur Champions. The weight class was contested at 115 pounds between 1889 and 1921. It was then contested at 118 pounds between 1922 and 1951, before moving to 119 pounds, where it is currently contested. The United States National Boxing Championships bestow the title of United States Amateur Champion on amateur boxers for winning the annual national amateur boxing tournament organized by USA Boxing, the national governing body for Olympic boxing and is the United States' member organization of the International Amateur Boxing Association (AIBA). It is one of four premier amateur boxing tournaments, the others being the National Golden Gloves Tournament, which crowns its own amateur bantamweight champion, the Police Athletic League Tournament, and the United States Armed Forces Tournament, all sending champions to the US Olympic Trials.

- 1888 - W. Rocap, Philadelphia, PA
- 1889 - W. Rocap, Philadelphia, PA (spring), W. Kenny, NJAC (winter
- 1890 - B. Weldon, New York, NY
- 1891 - G.F. Connolly, Boston, MA
- 1892 - Not held
- 1893 - M.J. Hallihan, Philadelphia, PA
- 1894 - R. McVeigh, SAC
- 1895 - E. Horen, Pittsburgh, PA
- 1896 - J.J. Gross, New York, NY
- 1897 - Charles Fahey, Rochester, NY
- 1898 - Not held
- 1899 - W. Wildner, NWSAC
- 1900 - H. Murphy, Bartholomew AC
- 1901 - George Young DC and AC
- 1902 - F. Fieg, Newark, NJ
- 1903 - Thomas Stone, New York, NY
- 1904 - Jerry Casey, NWSAC
- 1905 - Sam Moss, Waltham, MA
- 1906 - Harry Baker, Olympic Club
- 1907 - Henry Meyers, Chapman AC
- 1908 - M.J. Carroll, New York, NY
- 1909 - Joe Gorman, Northboro, MA
- 1910 - John Gallant, Boston, MA
- 1911 - Thomas Reagan, Boston, MA
- 1912 - Thomas Reagan, Boston, MA
- 1913 - Thomas Reagan, Boston, MA
- 1914 - S. Phillips, Boston, MA
- 1915 - Tony Vatlin, Brighton, MA
- 1916 - Benny Valgar, New York, NY
- 1917 - J. Tomasulo, New Jersey
- 1918 - J. Tomasulo, New Jersey
- 1919 - Ashton Donza, New Orleans, LA
- 1920 - J. Hutchinson, Philadelphia, PA
- 1921 - George Daly, New York, NY
- 1922 - Sid Terris, New York, NY
- 1923 - Harry Marcus, Cleveland, OH
- 1924 - Jack Tripoli, New York, NY
- 1925 - August Gotto, Los Angeles, CA
- 1926 - Joe Katish, Pittsburgh, PA
- 1927 - Tommy Paul, Buffalo, NY
- 1928 - John Daley, Waltham, MA
- 1929 - A. Holden, Providence, RI
- 1930 - Abie Miller, Los Angeles, CA
- 1931 - Joe Ferrante, Boston, MA
- 1932 - Jimmy Martin, New York, NY
- 1933 - A. Tardugno, Washington, DC
- 1934 - Armando Sicilia, New York, NY
- 1935 - Troy Bellini, Cleveland, OH
- 1936 - Willie Joyce, Gary, IN
- 1937 - Morris Parker, Newark, NJ
- 1938 - Bill Speary, Nanticoke, PA
- 1939 - Bill Speary, Philadelphia, PA
- 1940 - Angelo Ambrosano, Philadelphia, PA
- 1941 - Ray Brown, Chicago, IL
- 1942 - Bernard Docusen, New Orleans, LA
- 1943 - Earl O'Neil, Fort Still, OK
- 1944 - Nick Saunders, St. Louis, MO
- 1945 - Amos Aitson, Oklahoma City, OK
- 1946 - Tsaneshi Naruo, Hawaii
- 1947 - Corky Gonzales, Denver, CO
- 1948 - Bill Morgan, Newark, NJ
- 1949 - Jimmy Mitchell, Oakland, CA
- 1950 - Mickey Mars, Cleveland, OH
- 1951 - Ernest De Jesus, Honolulu, HI
- 1952 - Davey Moore, Springfield, OH
- 1953 - T. Nethercott, Port Chester, NY
- 1954 - Bill Ramos, New Bedford, MA
- 1955 - John Cereghin, Air Force
- 1956 - Don Whaley, Cincinnati, OH
- 1957 - Herman Marques, Stockton, CA
- 1958 - Charles Branch, Philadelphia, PA
- 1959 - Fred Griffin, Toledo, OH
- 1960 - O. German, Muskegon, MI
- 1961 - John Howard, Portland, OR
- 1962 - Victor Melendez, Puerto Rico
- 1963 - Gerry Lott, New Orleans, LA
- 1964 - Art Jones, San Francisco, CA
- 1965 - George Colon, New York, NY
- 1966 - Jose Marquez, Puerto Rico
- 1967 - Earl Large, Clovis, NM
- 1968 - Sammy Goss, Trenton, NJ
- 1969 - Terry Pullen, New Orleans, LA
- 1970 - Robert Mullins, Charleston, SC
- 1971 - Ricardo Carreras, Air Force
- 1972 - John David, Navy
- 1973 - Mike Hess, Albany, OR
- 1974 - Mike Ayala, Fort Worth, TX
- 1975 - Eiichi Jumawan, Waiawa, HI
- 1976 - Bernard Taylor, Charlotte, NC
- 1977 - Rocky Lockridge, Tacoma, WA
- 1978 - Jackie Beard, Jackson, TN
- 1979 - Jackie Beard, Jackson, TN
- 1980 - Jackie Beard, Jackson, TN
- 1981 - Richard Savage, West Monroe, LA
- 1982 - Floyd Favors, Capitol Heights, MD (spring), Meldrick Taylor, Philadelphia, PA (winter)
- 1983 - Jesse Benavides, Corpus Christi, TX
- 1984 - Eugene Speed, Washington, DC
- 1985 - Michael Collins, La Porte, TX
- 1986 - Michael Collins, La Porte, TX
- 1987 - Michael Collins, La Porte, TX
- 1988 - Jemal Hinton, New Carrollton, MD
- 1989 - Tony Gonzalez
- 1990 - Sergio Reyes Jr., Marines
- 1991 - Sergio Reyes Jr., Marines
- 1992 - Sean Fletcher, Navy
- 1993 - Aristead Clayton, Baker, LA
- 1994 - Jorge Munoz, El Paso, TX
- 1995 - Carlos Navarro, Los Angeles, CA
- 1996 - Jesus Vega, Salinas, CA
- 1997 - Cornelius Lock, Detroit, MI
- 1998 - Antonio Rodriguez, Wailuku, HI
- 1999 - Clarence Vinson, Washington, DC
- 2000 - Sergio Espinoza, San Diego, CA
- 2001 - David Martinez, Stockton, CA
- 2002 - Aaron Garcia, Vista, CA
- 2003 - Samson Guillermo, Waianae, HI
- 2004 - Roberto Benitez, New York, NY
- 2005 - Gary Russell, Jr., Capitol Heights, MD
- 2006 - Gary Russell, Jr., Capitol Heights, MD
- 2007 - Ronny Rios, Santa Ana, CA
- 2008 - Ronny Rios, Santa Ana, CA
- 2009 - Jessie Magdaleno
- 2010 - Harry Saunders jr, Capitol Heights, Md
- 2011 - John Franklin, Fort Carson, Colo/United States Army
- 2012 - Charles Martin, Tulsa, OK/United States Army
- 2013 - Eduardo Martinez, Aurora, IL
- 2014 - JaRico O'Quinn, Detroit, MI
