= Johnny De La Rosa =

Dominican boxer (born 1962)

Personal information
- Nationality: Dominican-American
- Born: Juan De La Rosa; 1962 (age 63–64) Santo Domingo, Dominican Republic

Boxing career
- Weight class: Featherweight, Junior Lightweight

Boxing record
- Total fights: 46
- Wins: 39
- Win by KO: 24
- Losses: 7

Juan "Johnny" De La Rosa (born 1962) is a former professional boxer from the Dominican Republic. A featherweight and junior lightweight, he was a two-time world title challenger who, on June 25, 1983, came very close to becoming a world champion, losing a 12 rounds split decision to then World Boxing Council world featherweight champion Juan Laporte in San Juan, Puerto Rico.

== Professional boxing career ==
A skilled boxer-puncher, De La Rosa debuted on 15 May 1980 in San Juan, Puerto Rico, against Jesus Rosado, who had lost one and drawn (tied) one of his two previous professional contests. De La Rosa won by six rounds unanimous decision.

De La Rosa's first fight in his home country took place on 20 October 1980, against the debuting Ruben Dario Herasme in De La Rosa's third contest as a professional, which was held in Santo Domingo, as part of a program where the main event was Miguel Montilla's ninth-round technical knockout win over former WBA world junior-welterweight champion Alfonso Frazer of Panama. Herasme later faced, among others, future International Boxing Hall of Fame member and WBA world featherweight champion Barry McGuigan, former WBA world bantamweight champion Julian Solis, future WBC world featherweight champion Marcos Villasana, Tyrone Crawley, future WBC world featherweight title challenger Juvenal Ordenes of Chile, Bernard Gray, Bernard Taylor and others in a short, 17 fight professional career. De La Rosa won this contest by a four-rounds unanimous decision. This bout began a three-fight series between De La Rosa and Herasme, all of which were won by De La Rosa.

Herasme and De La Rosa had an immediate rematch, which took place 20 days after their first match, on 10 November 1980 at Santo Domingo as the main event of a program that also included future WBA world junior flyweight champion Francisco Quiroz. In this contest, De La Rosa scored his first knockout win, when he defeated Herasme by a third-round technical knockout in a ten-rounds scheduled meeting.

Three more victories in the Dominican Republic followed his second win over Herasme, and then De La Rosa became an established resident in the United States at Miami, Florida, before his first fight in the States took place, on 11 November 1981 at the Curtis Hixon Hall in Tampa, Florida. In that contest, he stopped the 5 wins, 4 losses and 1 draw Eddie Richardson in the second of ten rounds.

Counting the aforementioned victories, De La Rosa started his career with twenty one consecutive wins, sixteen of them by knockout. But the opposition he faced, with the exception of Ecuador's world ranked Hector Cortez (35 wins, 9 losses and 3 draws coming into their Tuesday, 2 March 1982 contest at the Miami Beach Auditorium, a ten-rounds majority decision win for De La Rosa) and the undefeated, 10 wins and 2 draws Ricky Wallace (a ten-rounds decision win for De La Rosa as part of a program headlined by a Rafael Solis fight on Saturday, 2 October 1982 at the Miami Beach Convention Center in Miami Beach) was mostly obscure, reason why, when the World Boxing Council named De La Rosa their official challenger for Juan Laporte's world featherweight championship recognized by that entity, not many boxing critics or fans gave him much of a chance to dethrone the Puerto Rican boxer.

=== First world title fight ===
Juan Laporte, the Puerto Rican WBC world featherweight champion who had succeeded Salvador Sanchez as champion after Sanchez's death at age 23 in 1982 and then defended it against Ruben Castillo on February 1983, went into his fight with De la Rosa on 25 June 1983 at the Roberto Clemente Coliseum in San Juan expecting an easy victory against the young Dominican challenger.

Laporte was, however, in for a surprise. De La Rosa gave him a very close fight, one so close that some fans online have even claimed that the judges took rightful victory from him. In any case, Laporte hurt De la Rosa towards the end of round ten and De La Rosa was in severe distress in the last few rounds. De La Rosa lost a point at some point in the contest, which proved pivotal, as he lost the title fight, and his undefeated status with it, by a 12-rounds split decision, with scores of 116-113 for De la Rosa by James Jen Kin, 116-111 for Laporte by John Coyle and 115-114, also for Laporte by Harry Gibbs. Had De La Rosa not lost a point, the fight would have been declared a draw (tie) and, while in fact Laporte would have retained the world championship, De La Rosa would have also retained his status as an undefeated boxer.

=== Moving on after Laporte ===
De La Rosa then reeled off three consecutive wins, including one on 23 June 1984 against undefeated (14-0) Benjie Marquez in San Juan as part of a program headlined by a WBC world Lightweight title bout between Edwin Rosario and Howard Davis, Jr. at the Roberto Clemente Coliseum, which (De La Rosa-Marquez) was won by decision in ten rounds by De La Rosa, then he ventured to Oranjestad, Aruba, where on 4 May 1985, he lost to future WBA world featherweight champion, legendary Venezuelan Antonio Esparragoza by a third round knockout at the Concorde Boxing Arena as part of another program headlined by a world championship match, this time for the vacant WBC world bantamweight championship between Daniel Zaragoza of Mexico and Freddie Jackson of the United States.

De La Rosa returned to title contention by winning ten fights in a row after the Esparragoza defeat; included among those was a win over Adriano Arreola of Mexico on 17 April 1986 at New York City's Madison Square Garden's Felt Forum to claim the WBC Continental Americas' junior lightweight title by a seventh-round technical knockout, and a defense of that belt against American Jackie Beard, on 10 July of the same year, a twelve-rounds split decision victory for De La Rosa, also at the Felt Forum in New York.

=== Second world title challenge: Rocky Lockridge ===
De La Rosa challenged Rocky Lockridge, who had a record of 41 wins and 5 losses, for the American's IBF world junior lightweight championship on 25 October 1987 at the Convention Center in Tucson, Arizona. Once again, De La Rosa was on the verge of becoming a world champion. He dropped Lockrodge to the canvas near the end of round three and was winning the fight on one of the three judges' scorecards until he was spectacularly knocked out in round ten.

According to the fight's American television broadcasting team, De La Rosa was by then living in Puerto Rico.

=== Rest of career ===
De La Rosa followed with a third fight against Ruben Dario Herasme, against whom he emerged victorious for the third time, on 26 February 1988 in Santo Domingo by four-rounds decision. From this point on, however, his professional boxing career turned into one of ups-and-downs, as he won four of his last eight bouts during this part of his career. One notable contest was against former IBF and WBO world featherweight champion Jorge Paez, on 27 March 1992, as part of an undercard headlined by a WBA world super bantamweight title match between Mexican champion Raul "Jibaro" Perez and Puerto Rican challenger Wilfredo Vazquez (won by Vazquez by a third-round knockout). Held at the Palacio de los Deportes in Mexico City, this fight saw De La Rosa last the ten rounds distance but lose by a wide margin ten-rounds unanimous decision. He also held one fight in Spain during this latter part of his career.

De La Rosa closed his professional boxing career after losing to Roberto Sierra, a boxer with a modest record of 3 wins and 4 losses, on 26 April 1996, at the Music Fair, in Westbury, New York, in a card headlined by a Trevor Berbick fight.

== Professional boxing record ==
A two-time world championship challenger, De La Rosa had 46 professional bouts, of which he won 39 and lost 7, with 24 wins and 3 losses by knockout or technical knockout.

== Personal ==
He has a brother, Inocencio ("Mao"), who also fought professionally.

De La Rosa lives in Miami, Florida.

== See also ==
- List of people from the Dominican Republic
- Leo Cruz - another Dominican boxer and long time Puerto Rico resident
- Ramon Nery - another Dominican boxer who was popular in Puerto Rico
