= Joey Gamache =

American boxer

Personal information
- Born: Joseph Gamache; May 20, 1966 (age 60) Bath, Maine, U.S.
- Height: 5 ft 6 in (168 cm)
- Weight: Super featherweight; Lightweight; Light welterweight

Boxing career
- Reach: 67 in (170 cm)
- Stance: Orthodox

Boxing record
- Total fights: 59
- Wins: 55
- Win by KO: 38
- Losses: 4

Joseph Gamache (born May 20, 1966) is an American boxing trainer and former professional boxer who competed from 1987 to 2000. He is a world champion in two weight classes, having held the World Boxing Association (WBA) super featherweight title in 1991 and the WBA lightweight title in 1992.

== Early years ==
At the age of 10, playing third base in Little League Baseball, Gamache tended to loop his throws to first base. His father suggested that if he worked out in a boxing gym he might strengthen his arms and straighten out his long throws across the infield. Gamache would come to love the rites of the gym and soon set aside baseball to become a boxer.

== Professional boxing career ==
Gamache was trained by Tony Lampron and Teddy Atlas. He turned professional in 1987 and won his first 28 bouts.

=== Two-weight world champion ===
In 1991, Gamache defeated Jerry Ngobeni (19–1) to capture the vacant WBA super featherweight title. He vacated the title to move up to lightweight. The following year, Gamache defeated Chil-Sung Chun (18–1) to win the vacant WBA lightweight title. He lost the lightweight title in his first defense to Tony Lopez (40–3–1) via TKO in the eleventh round. Gamache fought bravely against the stronger, more experienced Lopez. In 1994, Gamache fought Orzubek Nazarov (19–0) for the WBA lightweight title, but lost via second-round TKO. He fought Julio César Chávez (96–2–1) in 1996. The referee stopped the fight at the end of the 8th round, giving Chávez a harder-than-expected victory.

=== Retirement ===
In his last fight on February 26, 2000, Gamache was brutally knocked out in two rounds by Arturo Gatti (30–4) at Madison Square Garden. Gamache went on to file lawsuits against both Gatti and the New York State Athletic Commission, alleging that Gatti weighed significantly more than the contracted weight at the time of the fight. A NYSAC official allowed Gatti off the scale before it could be determined that he had made the 141-pound weight limit. HBO said Gatti weighed 160 pounds on fight night compared to Gamache's 145 pounds. Gamache said he suffered brain damage as a result of the brutal knockout and was hospitalised for days. The case was tried and decided by Judge Melvin Schweitzer, who found the state negligent in its lax handling of the pre-fight weigh-in. Gamache was not awarded any damages, as Schweitzer was not convinced that the negligence was a substantial factor in causing Gamache's injury. Gamache considered the verdict a win as it acknowledged the NYSAC's negligence.

== Professional boxing record ==
59 fights	55 wins	4 losses
By knockout	38	4
By decision	17	0

No.	Result	Record	Opponent	Type	Round, time	Date	Location	Notes
59	Loss	55–4	Arturo Gatti	KO	2 (10), 0:41	Feb 26, 2000	Madison Square Garden, New York City, New York, U.S.	
58	Win	55–3	Craig Houk	TKO	6 (8), 1:04	Nov 5, 1999	Armory, Lewiston, Maine, U.S.	
57	Win	54–3	Jerry Smith	TKO	8 (10)	Aug 7, 1999	BI-LO Center, Greenville, South Carolina, U.S.	
56	Win	53–3	John Bailey	UD	10	Apr 30, 1999	Turning Stone Resort Casino, Verona, New York, U.S.	
55	Win	52–3	Mark Brannon	TKO	4 (10), 0:39	Nov 20, 1998	Catfish Bend Casino, Burlington, Iowa, U.S.	
54	Win	51–3	Chuck Sturm	TKO	6 (10), 2:19	Aug 30, 1998	Mountaineer Casino, New Cumberland, West Virginia, U.S.	
53	Win	50–3	Tim Scott	TKO	3 (10), 0:39	Jul 30, 1998	Roxy Theater, Atlanta, Georgia, U.S.	
52	Win	49–3	Felix Dubray	KO	4 (12), 1:14	May 9, 1998	Casino Omaha, Onawa, Iowa, U.S.	
51	Win	48–3	Felix Dubray	KO	3 (10), 1:06	Feb 20, 1998	Station Casino, Kansas City, Missouri, U.S.	
50	Win	47–3	Julio Ibarra	TKO	3 (10)	Oct 24, 1997	Memorial Auditorium, Burlington, Vermont, U.S.	
49	Win	46–3	Rocky Berg	KO	3 (?), 2:00	Jun 14, 1997	Casino Omaha, Onawa, Iowa, U.S.	
48	Loss	45–3	Julio César Chávez	RTD	8 (10), 3:00	Oct 12, 1996	Arrowhead Pond, Anaheim, California, U.S.	
47	Win	45–2	Tim Bonds	TKO	5 (10), 1:15	Jul 31, 1996	Prairie Meadows, Altoona, Iowa, U.S.	
46	Win	44–2	Rocky Martinez	UD	12	Mar 31, 1996	Sullivan Gymnasium, Portland, Maine, U.S.	Won vacant WBU light welterweight title
45	Win	43–2	Tim Payton	TKO	4 (10)	Feb 9, 1996	Ho-Chunk Casino, Delton, Wisconsin, U.S.	
44	Win	42–2	Kenneth Kidd	UD	8	Nov 20, 1995	Marriott Allis Plaza Hotel, Kansas City, Missouri, U.S.	
43	Win	41–2	Tony Enna	TKO	8 (10), 1:01	Nov 8, 1995	Hyatt Regency Hotel, Baltimore, Maryland, U.S.	
42	Win	40–2	Danny Mason	TKO	4 (10)	Sep 15, 1995	Everett Arena, Concord, New Hampshire, U.S.	Won vacant New England light welterweight title
41	Win	39–2	Jose Ruiz	TKO	1 (?), 1:57	Aug 19, 1995	Hyatt Regency Hotel, Knoxville, Tennessee, U.S.	
40	Win	38–2	Tony Enna	TKO	7 (10)	Aug 1, 1995	New Daisy Theatre, Memphis, Tennessee, U.S.	
39	Win	37–2	Tim Bonds	KO	5 (?), 1:55	Jul 11, 1995	New Daisy Theatre, Memphis, Tennessee, U.S.	
38	Loss	36–2	Orzubek Nazarov	KO	2 (12), 2:50	Dec 10, 1994	Cumberland County Civic Center, Portland, Maine, U.S.	For WBA lightweight title
37	Win	36–1	Wayne Boudreaux	UD	10	Jun 2, 1994	Central Maine Civic Center, Lewiston, Maine, U.S.	
36	Win	35–1	Jeff Mayweather	UD	12	Jan 28, 1994	Central Maine Civic Center, Lewiston, Maine, U.S.	Won vacant NABF light welterweight title
35	Win	34–1	Han Kim	TKO	1 (10), 1:56	Dec 8, 1993	Armory, Augusta, Maine, U.S.	
34	Win	33–1	Jeff Bumpus	TKO	10 (10), 0:19	Sep 10, 1993	Central Maine Civic Center, Lewiston, Maine, U.S.	
33	Win	32–1	Bobby Amsler	TKO	5 (10), 0:41	Jun 26, 1993	Auditorium, Bangor, Maine, U.S.	
32	Win	31–1	Rocky Berg	TKO	2 (10) , 1:28	Apr 23, 1993	Auditorium, Bangor, Maine, U.S.	
31	Win	30–1	Mike Grow	UD	10	Feb 12, 1993	Central Maine Civic Center, Lewiston, Maine, U.S.	
30	Loss	29–1	Tony Lopez	TKO	11 (12), 0:40	Oct 24, 1992	Cumberland County Civic Center, Portland, Maine, U.S.	Lost WBA lightweight title
29	Win	29–0	Chil Sung Jun	TKO	9 (12)	Jun 13, 1992	Cumberland County Civic Center, Portland, Maine, U.S.	Won vacant WBA lightweight title
28	Win	28–0	Tommy Hanks	UD	10	Mar 27, 1992	Exposition Building, Portland, Maine, U.S.	
27	Win	27–0	Rick Souce	TKO	3 (10), 1:43	Jan 24, 1992	Gennevilliers, France	
26	Win	26–0	Tim Tipton	KO	2 (10), 3:03	Nov 22, 1991	Complex Sport le COMEP, Épernay, France	
25	Win	25–0	Jerry Ngobeni	TKO	10 (12), 2:33	Jun 28, 1991	Raceway, Lewiston, Maine, U.S.	Won vacant WBA super featherweight title
24	Win	24–0	Verdell Smith	TKO	6 (10), 0:51	May 10, 1991	Central Maine Civic Center, Lewiston, Maine, U.S.	
23	Win	23–0	Arthur Clarke	KO	3 (?) , 1:35	Apr 12, 1991	Jacksonville, Florida, U.S.	
22	Win	22–0	Jackie Beard	TKO	8 (10), 0:38	Feb 5, 1991	Central Maine Civic Center, Lewiston, Maine, U.S.	
21	Win	21–0	Jeff Franklin	UD	12	Nov 9, 1990	Central Maine Civic Center, Lewiston, Maine, U.S.	Retained IBF Inter-Continental super featherweight title
20	Win	20–0	Brian Brown	UD	10	May 18, 1990	Civic Center, Augusta, Maine, U.S.	
19	Win	19–0	Nelson Rodriguez	UD	12	Apr 6, 1990	Central Maine Civic Center, Lewiston, Maine, U.S.	Retained IBF Inter-Continental super featherweight title
18	Win	18–0	Irving Mitchell	TKO	4 (12)	Jan 5, 1990	Central Maine Civic Center, Lewiston, Maine, U.S.	Won vacant IBF Inter-Continental super featherweight title
17	Win	17–0	Richie Foster	UD	10	Sep 28, 1989	Central Maine Civic Center, Lewiston, Maine, U.S.	
16	Win	16–0	John Kalbhenn	UD	10	Jul 3, 1989	The Ballpark, Old Orchard Beach, Maine, U.S.	
15	Win	15–0	Roberto Rubaldino	RTD	7 (10), 3:00	Apr 20, 1989	Armory, Lewiston, Maine, U.S.	
14	Win	14–0	Felix Dubray	TKO	7 (10), 1:15	Feb 16, 1989	Armory, Lewiston, Maine, U.S.	
13	Win	13–0	Rafael Gandarilla	UD	8	Dec 1, 1988	Armory, Lewiston, Maine, U.S.	
12	Win	12–0	Jose Soto	KO	1 (8), 1:55	Oct 22, 1988	Salem Boys Club, Salem, New Hampshire, U.S.	
11	Win	11–0	Mark Brannon	TKO	1 (8), 2:37	Sep 2, 1988	Armory, Lewiston, Maine, U.S.	
10	Win	10–0	Shawn Spinda	KO	1 (?)	Jun 30, 1988	Pavilion Convention Center, Virginia Beach, Virginia, U.S.	
9	Win	9–0	Benny Marquez	UD	8	Jun 9, 1988	Armory, Lewiston, Maine, U.S.	
8	Win	8–0	Stephan Zaffirof	UD	6	Apr 23, 1988	Palais des Sports, Berck, France	
7	Win	7–0	Samuel Meck	UD	6	Mar 12, 1988	Stade de Levallois, Levallois-Perret, France	
6	Win	6–0	Marc Amand	TKO	5 (?)	Jan 30, 1988	Calais, France	
5	Win	5–0	Ali Amouche	KO	3 (?)	Jan 23, 1988	Palais des Sports, Gamaches, France	
4	Win	4–0	Chris Godeaux	TKO	1 (4), 1:32	Dec 4, 1987	Citrus Center Showcase, Winter Haven, Florida, U.S.	
3	Win	3–0	Johnny Redd	UD	6	Jun 27, 1987	Armory, Lewiston, Maine, U.S.	
2	Win	2–0	John Pitts	KO	3 (6), 2:34	May 23, 1987	High School, Bucksport, Maine, U.S.	
1	Win	1–0	Al Jackson	RTD	3 (6), 3:00	May 1, 1987	Armory, Lewiston, Maine, U.S.	

== Titles in boxing ==
=== Major world titles ===
- WBA super featherweight champion (130 lbs)
- WBA lightweight champion (135 lbs)

=== Minor world titles ===
- WBU light welterweight champion (140 lbs)

=== Regional/International titles ===
- IBF Inter-Continental super featherweight champion (130 lbs)
- NABF light welterweight champion (140 lbs)

== Training career ==
Gamache's son, Steven Gamache, made his professional debut in 2010. Today, Gamache works as a licensed boxing trainer, coaching some of the top fighters in the sport. He trained Boyd Melson, who won the gold medal at the 2004 World Military Boxing Championships in the 69 kg weight class and fought professionally at light middleweight until his retirement in 2016. Gamache was hired by Team Sauerland, and trained the Danish super middleweight contender Patrick Nielsen. Gamache is the current trainer of Swedish boxer Otto Wallin, who faced the former unified heavyweight world champion Tyson Fury on September 14, 2019. He is also a member of the training team of Teofimo Lopez

== See also ==
- List of world super-featherweight boxing champions
- List of world lightweight boxing champions

Sporting positions
Regional boxing titles
New title	IBF Inter-Continental super-featherweight champion January 5, 1990 – June 28, 1991; Won world title	Vacant Title next held by Wilson Rodriguez
Vacant Title last held by David Santos	NABF light-welterweight champion January 28, 1994 – 1994; Vacated	Vacant Title next held by Darryl Tyson
Vacant Title last held by Sean Malone	New England light-welterweight champion September 15, 1995 – 1995; Vacated	Vacant Title next held by Jeff Fraza
Minor World boxing titles
Vacant Title last held by Jake Rodríguez	WBU light-welterweight champion March 31, 1996 – 1996; Vacated	Vacant Title next held by Shea Neary
Major World boxing titles
Vacant Title last held by Brian Mitchell	WBA super-featherweight champion June 28, 1991 – October 20, 1991; Vacated	Vacant Title next held by Genaro Hernández
Vacant Title last held by Pernell Whitaker	WBA lightweight champion June 13, 1992 – October 24, 1992	Succeeded by Tony Lopez
