= Martin Nielsen =

Martin Nielsen may refer to:

- Martin Nielsen (politician) (1900–1962), Danish politician
- Martin Møller Nielsen (born 1964), UK-based Danish billionaire
- Martin Nielsen (boxer) (born 1981), Danish boxer
- Martin Ulrich Nielsen (born 1973), Danish footballer and manager
