= Dingaan Thobela =

South African boxer (1966–2024)

Personal information
- Nickname: The Rose of Soweto
- Born: Dingaan Bongani Thobela; 24 September 1966 Soweto, Transvaal, South Africa
- Died: 29 April 2024 (aged 57)
- Height: 5 ft 7 1/2 in (171 cm)
- Weight: Lightweight; Welterweight; Middleweight; Super-middleweight

Boxing career
- Reach: 72 in (183 cm)
- Stance: Orthodox

Boxing record
- Total fights: 56
- Wins: 40
- Win by KO: 26
- Losses: 14
- Draws: 2

Dingaan Bongani Thobela (24 September 1966 – 29 April 2024) was a South African professional boxer who competed between 1986 and 2006. He is one of only two boxers in history, along with Terence Crawford, to win world titles at both lightweight and super-middleweight. Thobela held the World Boxing Organization (WBO) lightweight title from 1990 to 1992, the World Boxing Association (WBA) lightweight in 1993, and the World Boxing Council (WBC) super-middleweight title in 2000.

== Early Life ==
Thobela was born at Baragwanath Hospital on 24 September 1966, his paternal grandmother decided to rename him Dingaan due to sharing the same name with his paternal half-brother. He later adopted the name Bongani as his middle name. Dingaan started boxing as a young boy in Chiawelo, Soweto as a way to defend himself. His father knew people involved in boxing, which helped develop his interest in the sport. He train at Norman Hlabane's gym in New Canada, Soweto. Hlabane guided Dingaan through 83 amateur fights, of which he lost three. Dingaan would make his professional debut on 28 June 1996 at the age of 19 while in Grade 11 at Ngungunyane Secondary School in Soweto. He kept his professional boxing career private from his schoolmates.

== Professional career ==
Thobela, known as "The Rose of Soweto", turned pro in 1986 and won the WBO lightweight title in 1990 after beating Mauricio Aceves. After defending the belt three times, he relinquished the title and then challenged WBA lightweight title holder Tony Lopez in 1993, but lost a hotly disputed decision. Later that year he rematched Lopez, and won a decision to win the title. Battling to make the weight, he lost the title in his first defense to Orzubek Nazarov, and lost a rematch to Nazarov in 1994. He stopped WBF junior welterweight champion Kenny Vice in a non-title fight shortly after that.

Thobela later moved up significantly in weight class, and in the twilight of his career in 2000 took on WBC super middleweight title holder Glenn Catley, winning the belt via a 12th-round KO in only his second fight at the higher weight limit. He again lost the title in his first defense to Dave Hilton Jr via controversial split decision. The loss to Hilton was the beginning of the end for Thobela, who lost his next five fights, including a TKO loss to Eric Lucas for the WBC super middleweight title in 2001 as well as later champions Mikkel Kessler and Lucian Bute.

== Comeback ==
Thobela returned to the ring at the age of 40 and after an absence of nearly two years on 27 October 2006 when he challenged Soon Botes for the South African light heavyweight title at the Wembley Indoor Arena in Johannesburg, South Africa. He had defeated Botes back in 2000 to win the South African Super middleweight title. Many were surprised that the bout was sanctioned as Thobela failed to make the weight and his inactivity and age. Although Thobela dropped Botes he was clearly not conditioned to fight and did not come out for the tenth round.

== Death ==
On 29 April 2024, Thobela was found dead in his apartment in Johannesburg at the age of 57 after a period of illness. His death came days after South Africa celebrated the 30th anniversary of the end of the apartheid

== Professional boxing record ==
| 56 fights | 40 wins | 14 losses |
|---|---|---|
| By knockout | 26 | 4 |
| By decision | 14 | 10 |
| Draws | 2 | |

| No. | Result | Record | Opponent | Type | Round, time | Date | Location | Notes |
|---|---|---|---|---|---|---|---|---|
| 56 | Loss | 40–14–2 | Soon Botes | RTD | 10 (12), 3:00 | 27 Oct 2006 | Wembley Indoor Arena, Johannesburg, South Africa | |
| 55 | Loss | 40–13–2 | Lucian Bute | TKO | 4 (8), 1:22 | 3 Dec 2004 | Bell Centre, Montreal, Quebec, Canada | |
| 54 | Loss | 40–12–2 | Martin Nielsen | UD | 6 | 13 Dec 2003 | Falkoner Center, Frederiksberg, Denmark | |
| 53 | Loss | 40–11–2 | Otis Grant | UD | 8 | 22 Nov 2003 | Bell Centre, Montreal, Quebec, Canada | |
| 52 | Loss | 40–10–2 | Mikkel Kessler | UD | 12 | 29 Nov 2002 | Falkoner Center, Frederiksberg, Denmark | For vacant IBA super-middleweight title |
| 51 | Loss | 40–9–2 | Éric Lucas | TKO | 8 (12), 2:15 | 30 Nov 2001 | Molson Centre, Montreal, Quebec, Canada | For WBC super-middleweight title |
| 50 | Loss | 40–8–2 | Dave Hilton Jr. | SD | 12 | 15 Dec 2000 | Molson Centre, Montreal, Quebec, Canada | Lost WBC super-middleweight title |
| 49 | Win | 40–7–2 | Glenn Catley | KO | 12 (12), 2:53 | 1 Sep 2000 | Carnival City Casino, Brakpan, South Africa | Won WBC super-middleweight title |
| 48 | Win | 39–7–2 | Soon Botes | MD | 12 | 19 Feb 2000 | Carnival City Casino, Brakpan, South Africa | Won South African super-middleweight title |
| 47 | Loss | 38–7–2 | Cornelius Carr | MD | 12 | 31 Oct 1999 | David Lloyd Tennis Centre, Raynes Park, England, U.K. | For WBF middleweight title |
| 46 | Win | 38–6–2 | Adrian Walter Daneff | TKO | 7 (12) | 6 Mar 1999 | Nasrec Indoor Arena, Johannesburg, South Africa | |
| 45 | Draw | 37–6–2 | Carlos Baldomir | SD | 12 | 28 Oct 1998 | Nasrec Indoor Arena, Johannesburg, South Africa | For vacant WBC International welterweight title |
| 44 | Win | 37–6–1 | Gary Murray | TKO | 4 (10) | 8 Oct 1997 | Carousel Casino, Hammanskraal, South Africa | |
| 43 | Loss | 36–6–1 | Willy Wise | SD | 10 | 22 Mar 1997 | Wembley Indoor Arena, Johannesburg, South Africa | |
| 42 | Loss | 36–5–1 | Geoff McCreesh | KO | 2 (8), 2:59 | 5 Nov 1996 | Carousel Casino, Hammanskraal, South Africa | |
| 41 | Win | 36–4–1 | Wayne Boudreaux | KO | 6 (10) | 25 Jun 1996 | Morula Sun Casino, Mabopane, South Africa | |
| 40 | Win | 35–4–1 | Booker Kidd | TKO | 3 (10) | 25 Jun 1996 | Fernwood Resort, Bushkill, Pennsylvania, U.S. | |
| 39 | Win | 34–4–1 | Mark McCreath | TKO | 9 (10) | 25 Nov 1995 | Basil Kenyon Stadium, East London, South Africa | |
| 38 | Win | 33–4–1 | Jaime Balboa | KO | 8 (10) | 26 Sep 1995 | Carousel Casino, Hammanskraal, Gauteng, South Africa | |
| 37 | Win | 32–4–1 | Santiago Alfonso Ahumada | TKO | 2 (10), 1:34 | 19 Aug 1995 | Superbowl, Sun City, North-West, South Africa | |
| 36 | Win | 31–4–1 | Kenny Vice | TKO | 2 (10) | 6 May 1995 | Village Green, Durban, South Africa | |
| 35 | Win | 30–4–1 | Andreas Panayi | TKO | 2 (10) | 11 Feb 1995 | Carousel Casino, Hammanskraal, South Africa | |
| 34 | Loss | 29–4–1 | Karl Taylor | PTS | 8 | 29 Nov 1994 | Chase Leisure Centre, Cannock, England, U.K. | |
| 33 | Loss | 29–3–1 | Orzubek Nazarov | UD | 12 | 19 Mar 1994 | Carousel Casino, Hammanskraal, South Africa | For WBA lightweight title |
| 32 | Loss | 29–2–1 | Orzubek Nazarov | UD | 12 | 30 Oct 1993 | Nasrec Indoor Arena, Johannesburg, South Africa | Lost WBA lightweight title |
| 31 | Win | 29–1–1 | Tony Lopez | UD | 12 | 26 Jun 1993 | Superbowl, Sun City, Bophuthatswana | Won WBA lightweight title |
| 30 | Loss | 28–1–1 | Tony Lopez | UD | 12 | 12 Feb 1993 | ARCO Arena, Sacramento, California,, U.S. | For WBA lightweight title |
| 29 | Win | 28–0–1 | Tony Foster | PTS | 8 | 31 Oct 1992 | Earls Court Exhibition Centre, Kensington, U.K. | |
| 28 | Win | 27–0–1 | Peter Till | TKO | 9 (10) | 15 Aug 1992 | Indoor Centre, Springs, South Africa | |
| 27 | Win | 26–0–1 | Antonio Rivera | UD | 12 | 14 Sep 1991 | Standard Bank Arena, Johannesburg, South Africa | Retained WBO lightweight title |
| 26 | Win | 25–0–1 | Amancio Castro | UD | 10 | 13 Jul 1991 | Momentum Arena, Pretoria, South Africa | |
| 25 | Win | 24–0–1 | Mario Martínez | UD | 12 | 2 Mar 1991 | Exhibit Hall, San Jose, California, U.S. | Retained WBO lightweight title |
| 24 | Win | 23–0–1 | Mauricio Aceves | SD | 12 | 22 Sep 1990 | International Convention Center, Brownsville, Texas, U.S. | Won WBO lightweight title |
| 23 | Win | 22–0–1 | Pascual Aranda | TKO | 4 (10) | 23 Jul 1990 | Longhorn Ballroom, Dallas, U.S. | |
| 22 | Win | 21–0–1 | Mauricio Aceves | RTD | 7 (10), 3:00 | 27 Apr 1990 | Point Cadet Plaza, Biloxi, Mississippi, U.S. | |
| 21 | Win | 20–0–1 | Felipe Orozco | TKO | 10 (10) | 22 Jan 1990 | Portuguese Hall, Johannesburg, South Africa | |
| 20 | Win | 19–0–1 | Francisco Ortiz | UD | 10 | 5 Dec 1989 | First National Bank Arena, Durban, South Africa | |
| 19 | Win | 18–0–1 | Francisco Alvarez | TKO | 9 (10) | 21 Oct 1989 | San Juan, Puerto Rico | |
| 18 | Win | 17–0–1 | Danilo Cabrera | TKO | 3 (10) | 24 Jul 1989 | Portuguese Hall, Johannesburg, South Africa | |
| 17 | Win | 16–0–1 | Fred Adams | KO | 1 (10) | 15 May 1989 | Portuguese Hall, Johannesburg, South Africa | |
| 16 | Win | 15–0–1 | Mark Fernandez | TKO | 6 (10) | 11 Mar 1989 | Indoor Centre, Springs, South Africa | |
| 15 | Win | 14–0–1 | Daniel Londas | MD | 10 | 23 Jan 1989 | Portuguese Hall, Johannesburg, South Africa | |
| 14 | Win | 13–0–1 | Brian Roche | KO | 8 (10) | 13 Dec 1988 | West Ridge Park Tennis Stadium, Durban, South Africa | |
| 13 | Win | 12–0–1 | Mpisekhaya Mbaduli | TKO | 8 (12) | 1 Oct 1988 | Centenary Hall, New Brighton, Port Elizabeth, South Africa | Won South African super-featherweight title |
| 12 | Win | 11–0–1 | Ditau Molefyane | UD | 10 | 10 Jul 1988 | Don Mateman Hall, Eldorado Park, Johannesburg, South Africa | |
| 11 | Win | 10–0–1 | Andy DeAbreu | TKO | 5 (10) | 9 May 1988 | Kenneth McArthur Oval, Potchefstroom, South Africa | |
| 10 | Win | 9–0–1 | Gerald Isaacs | TKO | 3 (10) | 7 Mar 1988 | Oppenheimer Stadium, Orkney, South Africa | |
| 9 | Win | 8–0–1 | Samuel Boikanyo | TKO | 4 (8) | 1 Feb 1988 | Standard Bank Arena, Johannesburg, South Africa | |
| 8 | Win | 7–0–1 | Elijah Cele | PTS | 6 | 15 Dec 1987 | West Ridge Park Tennis Stadium, Durban, South Africa | |
| 7 | Win | 6–0–1 | Shorne Moorcroft | TKO | 5 (6) | 21 Nov 1987 | Springs Indoor Centre, Springs, South Africa | |
| 6 | Win | 5–0–1 | Walter Mpungose | TKO | 6 (6) | 11 Jul 1987 | Van Riebeeck Stadium, Witbank, South Africa | |
| 5 | Win | 4–0–1 | George Masango | PTS | 4 | 8 Mar 1987 | Tamil Hall, Laudium, Pretoria, South Africa | |
| 4 | Draw | 3–0–1 | Peter Mpikashe | PTS | 4 | 15 Dec 1986 | West Ridge Park Tennis Stadium, Durban, South Africa | |
| 3 | Win | 3–0 | David Matekane | PTS | 6 | 2 Nov 1986 | Don Mateman Hall, Eldorado Park, Johannesburg, South Africa | |
| 2 | Win | 2–0 | Christian Sithebe | TKO | 4 (6) | 27 Aug 1986 | Eldorado Park Stadium, Johannesburg, South Africa | |
| 1 | Win | 1–0 | Quinton Ryan | PTS | 4 | 28 Jun 1986 | Eldorado Park Stadium, Johannesburg, South Africa | |

== Titles in boxing ==
=== Major world titles ===
- WBA lightweight champion (135 lbs)
- WBO lightweight champion (135 lbs)
- WBC super-middleweight champion (168 lbs)

=== Regional/International titles ===
- South African super-featherweight champion (130 lbs)
- South African super-middleweight champion (168 lbs)

== See also ==
- List of world lightweight boxing champions
- List of world super-middleweight boxing champions

Sporting positions
World boxing titles
| Preceded by Mauricio Aceves | WBO lightweight champion 22 September 1990 – 14 June 1992; Vacated | Vacant Title next held by Giovanni Parisi |
| Preceded by Tony Lopez | WBA lightweight champion 26 June – 30 October 1993 | Succeeded by Orzubek Nazarov |
| Preceded by Glenn Catley | WBC super-middleweight champion 1 September – 15 December 2000 | Succeeded by Dave Hilton Jr. |
