= Saul Sanchez (boxer) =

American boxer (born 1997)

Personal information
- Nickname: The Beast
- Nationality: American
- Born: Saul Avimael Sanchez; 12 June 1997 (age 29) Encino, Los Angeles, U.S.
- Height: 5 ft 5 in (165 cm)
- Weight: Super-flyweight; Bantamweight; Super-bantamweight

Boxing career
- Reach: 66 in (168 cm)
- Stance: Orthodox

Boxing record
- Total fights: 26
- Wins: 21
- Win by KO: 12
- Losses: 4
- Draws: 1

Saul Avimael Sanchez (born 12 June 1997) is an American professional boxer.

== Professional boxing career ==
Sanchez made his professional boxing debut against Temoatzin Landeros Castillo on 6 February 2016. He won the fight by a third-round knockout. He amassed an 11–0 record during the next two years, before being scheduled to fight Brandon Leon Benitez for the vacant WBO Latino bantamweight title on 10 May 2019. He won the fight by an eight-round knockout. Sanchez faced Edwin Rodriguez on 23 August 2019, in his second fight of the year, and suffered an upset split decision loss.

After suffering the first loss of his professional career, Sanchez bounced back with a unanimous decision victory against the overmatched Victor Trejo Garcia on 21 February 2020. Sanchez was then booked to face Daniel Lozano for the vacant WBA Fedecentro super bantamweight title on 9 October 2020, in the main event of a "Boxeo Telemundo" card. He won the fight by a first-round knockout, dropping Lozano trice by the 2:14 minute mark of the opening round. Sanchez next faced Mario Hernandez on 20 December 2020. He won the fight by unanimous decision, with scores of 78–74, 79–73 and 78–74.

Sanchez dropped back down to bantamweight in order to face Frank Gonzalez for the vacant WBA Fedecentro bantamweight title on 19 March 2021. He made quick work of his opponent, stopping him at the 1:47 minute mark of the opening round. Sanchez then faced JaRico O'Quinn in the main event of the 24 September 2021 "ShoBox Next Generation" card. He achieved his career-best victory, as he stopped O'Quinn with a flurry of shots in the first round. Sanchez faced the journeyman Jose Estrella, in his third and final fight of the year, on 17 December 2021. He won the fight by a third-round knockout.

Sanchez is scheduled to face Eros Correa on 17 June 2022, in the main event of a Thompson Boxing's card, which took place at the Doubletree Events Center, in Ontario, California. He lost the fight by split decision. One judge scored the bout 96–94 for Sanchez, while the remaining two judges scored it 98–92 and 97–93 for Correa.

=== Sanchez vs. Moloney ===
On 13 January 2024 at the Videotron Centre in Québec City, Quebec, Canada, Sanchez challenged WBO bantamweight champion Jason Moloney but lost by majority decision.

== Professional boxing record ==
26 fights	21 wins	4 losses
By knockout	12	1
By decision	9	3
Draws	1	

No.	Result	Record	Opponent	Type	Round, time	Date	Location	Notes
26	Draw	21–4–1	Edwin Rodriguez	MD	8	10 Oct 2025	Commerce Casino, Commerce, U.S.	
25	Loss	21–4	John Riel Casimero	TKO	1 (10), 2:41	13 Oct 2024	Yokohama Budokan, Yokohama, Japan	
24	Win	21–3	Arthur Villanueva	UD	8	12 Jul 2024	Overtime Elite Arena, Atlanta, Georgia, U.S.	
23	Loss	20–3	Jason Moloney	MD	12	13 Jan 2024	Videotron Centre, Quebec City, Canada	For WBO bantamweight title
22	Win	20–2	RV Deniega	UD	8	12 Oct 2023	Ariake Arena, Tokyo, Japan	
21	Win	19–2	Franklin Gonzalez	KO	6 (10), 2:03	14 Jun 2023	Whitsands Events Center, Plant City, Florida, U.S.	
20	Loss	18–2	Eros Correa	SD	10	17 Jun 2022	Doubletree Events Center, Ontario, California, U.S.	
19	Win	18–1	Jose Estrella	KO	3 (8), 1:46	17 Dec 2021	DoubleTree Hotel, Ontario, California, U.S.	
18	Win	17–1	JaRico O'Quinn	TKO	1 (10), 1:58	24 Sep 2021	Central Park Community Center, Broken Arrow, Oklahoma, U.S.	
17	Win	16–1	Frank Gonzalez	TKO	1 (10), 1:47	19 Mar 2021	Bryan Glazer Family JCC Auditorium, Tampa, Florida, U.S.	Won vacant WBA Fedecentro bantamweight title
16	Win	15–1	Mario Hernandez	UD	8	20 Dec 2020	Omega Event Center, Ontario, California, U.S.	
15	Win	14–1	Daniel Lozano	TKO	1 (10), 2:14	9 Oct 2020	Osceola Heritage Park, Kissimmee, Florida, U.S.	Won vacant WBA Fedecentro super bantamweight title
14	Win	13–1	Victor Trejo Garcia	UD	8	21 Feb 2020	DoubleTree Hotel, Ontario, California, U.S.	
13	Loss	12–1	Edwin Rodriguez	SD	10	23 Aug 2019	Omega Products International, Corona, U.S.	
12	Win	12–0	Brandon Leon Benitez	KO	8 (10), 0:18	10 May 2019	Omega Products International, Corona, U.S.	Won vacant WBO Latino bantamweight title
11	Win	11–0	Luis Fernando Saavedra	MD	8	19 Oct 2018	DoubleTree Hotel, Ontario, U.S.	
10	Win	10–0	Ernesto Guerrero	KO	4 (8), 1:59	24 Aug 2018	Omega Products International, Corona, U.S.	
9	Win	9–0	Leonardo Torres	KO	3 (6), 2:24	22 Jun 2018	DoubleTree Hotel, Ontario, California, U.S.	
8	Win	8–0	Sam Rodriguez	UD	6	27 Apr 2018	DoubleTree Hotel, Ontario, California, U.S.	
7	Win	7–0	Pedro Melo	UD	4	16 Feb 2018	DoubleTree Hotel, Ontario, California, U.S.	
6	Win	6–0	Nestor Ramos	KO	1 (4), 1:06	20 Oct 2017	DoubleTree Hotel, Ontario, California, U.S.	
5	Win	5–0	Sergio Lopez	UD	4	23 Sep 2017	Agua Caliente Casino, Rancho Mirage, California, U.S.	
4	Win	4–0	Francisco Javier Lapizco	KO	2 (4), 2:44	25 Aug 2017	Omega Products International, Corona, California, U.S.	
3	Win	3–0	Cristian Raudry Bartolini	KO	1 (4), 1:20	23 Jun 2017	DoubleTree Hotel, Ontario, California, U.S.	
2	Win	2–0	Daniel Andujo	UD	6	4 Nov 2016	Omega Products International, Corona, California, U.S.	
1	Win	1–0	Temoatzin Landeros Castillo	KO	3 (4), 2:02	6 Feb 2016	Radisson Hotel, Ontario, California, U.S.	
