= Jackie Beard =

American boxer (born 1961)

Jackie Beard (born September 10, 1961) is an American former professional boxer who competed from 1981 to 1995, twice challenging for the WBA super featherweight title between 1989 and 1990. As an amateur, he won a gold medal at the 1979 Pan American Games and the 1979 Boxing World Cup. He was also the first boxer to win three consecutive US amateur championships in the same weight class.

== Amateur career ==
A native of Jackson, Tennessee, Beard began boxing at the age of eight, following his brother into the sport. He became an amateur standout in the late 1970s. He won the National AAU bantamweight championship three times (1978, 1979, and 1980), becoming the first boxer to win three straight Senior titles in the same weight class. He also won the bantamweight championship in the 1978 National Golden Gloves Tournament, upsetting defending champion Wayne Lynumn early in the tournament. For his achievements, Beard was named the 1978 Tennessee Co-Amateur Athlete of the Year.

Beard won the bantamweight gold medal at the 1979 Pan American Games in Puerto Rico as a 17-year-old, defeating Luis Pizarro in the final. He also won a gold medal at the Boxing World Cup.

Beard qualified for the 1980 U.S. Olympic boxing team, but the U.S. boycott of the Moscow summer games prevented him from the international competition. In 2007 Beard received one of 461 Congressional Gold Medals created especially for the spurned athletes.

== Professional career ==
Beard turned professional in 1981 and was undefeated in his first 12 fights before losing a split decision to contender Jose Caba. Following the loss Beard put together another string of wins but then lost a close decision to Johnny De La Rosa. He worked his way up to a title match against WBA super featherweight title holder Brian Mitchell in 1989, but lost a technical decision. They rematched the following year and Beard lost via unanimous decision. Following the loss, Beard's career declined and he lost most of his remaining professional fights. Beard retired in 1995 with a record of 36 Wins, 14 Losses and 22 KO's. He resides in Jackson, Tennessee.

| Preceded by Rocky Lockridge | National AAU Bantamweight Champion; 1978-1979-1980 | Succeeded by Richard Savage |
| Preceded by Wayne Lynumn | National Golden Gloves Bantamweight Champion; 1978 | Succeeded by Kenny Baysmore |
