= Mauricio Aceves =

Mexican boxer (born 1960)

Personal information
- Born: 18 December 1960 (age 65) Mexico City, Mexico
- Height: 5 ft 8 in (173 cm)
- Weight: Lightweight; Light welterweight

Boxing career
- Reach: 69 in (175 cm)
- Stance: Orthodox

Boxing record
- Total fights: 43
- Wins: 26
- Win by KO: 20
- Losses: 16
- Draws: 1

Mauricio Aceves (born 18 December 1960) is a Mexican former professional boxer in the Light welterweight division. He was the first ever WBO Lightweight Champion.

== Professional career ==
Mauricio has fought many undefeated boxers, including Shane Mosley, Dingaan Thobela, Todd Foster, Dennis Holbæk Pedersen, Billy Schwer and Rene Arredondo.

=== WBO Lightweight Championship ===
Aceves won the WBO Lightweight Championship by upsetting the veteran Amancio Castro in Santa Ana, California.

He almost lost his championship in his first defense, when his opponent Oscar Bejines had won every round before being knocked out with a single short left hook by Mauricio. He had to survive cuts over both eyes.

One of his last fights was a loss to boxing legend Jorge Páez.

== Professional boxing record ==
43 fights	26 wins	16 losses
By knockout	20	10
By decision	6	5
By disqualification	0	1
Draws	1	

No.	Result	Record	Opponent	Type	Round, time	Date	Location	Notes
43	Loss	26–16–1	Dennis Holbæk Pedersen	KO	5 (6)	1996-11-15	Næstved Hallen, Næstved, Denmark	
42	Loss	26–15–1	Shane Mosley	KO	4 (10)	1995-07-20	Arrowhead Pond, Anaheim, California, U.S.	
41	Loss	26–14–1	Fabian Hector Tejeda	PTS	10 (10)	1994-07-25	The Forum, Inglewood, California, U.S.	
40	Loss	26–13–1	Jorge Páez	UD	10 (10)	1994-04-11	The Forum, Inglewood, California, U.S.	
39	Loss	26–12–1	Billy Schwer	TKO	3 (10)	1992-12-17	London, England, U.K.	
38	Loss	26–11–1	Todd Foster	RTD	6 (10)	1991-11-14	Brick Breeden Fieldhouse, Bozeman, Montana, U.S.	
37	Loss	26–10–1	Aladin Stevens	TD	7 (10)	1991-07-13	Momentum Arena, Pretoria, South Africa	
36	Loss	26–9–1	Dingaan Thobela	SD	12 (12)	1990-09-22	Convention Center, Brownsville, Texas, U.S.	Lost WBO lightweight title
35	Loss	26–8–1	Dingaan Thobela	RTD	7 (10)	1990-04-27	Point Cadet Plaza, Biloxi, Mississippi, U.S.	
34	Win	26–7–1	Oscar Bejines	KO	10 (12)	1989-08-30	Sports Arena, Los Angeles, California, U.S.	Retained WBO lightweight title
33	Win	25–7–1	Amancio Castro	UD	12 (12)	1989-05-06	Santa Ana Stadium, Santa Ana, California, U.S.	Won inaugural WBO lightweight title
32	Draw	24–7–1	Amancio Castro	PTS	12 (12)	1989-01-20	Montería, Colombia	For inaugural WBO lightweight title
31	Loss	24–7	Roger Mayweather	TKO	3 (12)	1988-03-24	Sports Arena, Los Angeles, California, U.S.	For WBC light-welterweight title
30	Win	24–6	Tony Contreras	PTS	10 (10)	1987-12-14	Tijuana, Mexico	
29	Win	23–6	Alfredo Layne	TKO	5 (10)	1987-08-29	Olympic Auditorium, Los Angeles, California, U.S.	
28	Win	22–6	Julio Pastor Ruiz	KO	6 (10)	1987-05-28	Olympic Auditorium, Los Angeles, California, U.S.	
27	Win	21–6	Mark Fernandez	TKO	5 (10)	1987-03-26	Olympic Auditorium, Los Angeles, California, U.S.	
26	Win	20–6	Ernie Landeros	TKO	8 (?)	1986-10-09	The Forum, Inglewood, California, U.S.	
25	Win	19–6	Martin Morado	TD	8 (10)	1986-08-07	Olympic Auditorium, Los Angeles, California, U.S.	
24	Win	18–6	Eduardo Dominguez	TKO	8 (?)	1986-04-28	Tijuana, Mexico	
23	Win	17–6	Arturo Hernández	TKO	5 (?)	1985-12-21	Minatitlán, Mexico	
22	Win	16–6	Herminio Delgado	TKO	9 (?)	1985-03-23	Mexico City, Mexico	
21	Loss	15–6	Ricardo Peralta	KO	5 (?)	1984-10-27	Mérida, Mexico	
20	Win	15–5	Miguel Angel Dominguez	PTS	10 (10)	1984-09-08	Mexico City, Mexico	
19	Win	14–5	Agustin Vicenteno	KO	2 (?)	1984-07-14	Mexico City, Mexico	
18	Win	13–5	Jorge Mercado	TKO	6 (?)	1984-04-25	Mexico City, Mexico	
17	Win	12–5	Alejandro Garcia	KO	4 (?)	1984-02-21	Acapulco, Mexico	
16	Win	11–5	Raul Guerrero	PTS	10 (10)	1982-11-03	Mexico City, Mexico	
15	Loss	10–5	René Arredondo	PTS	10 (10)	1982-03-10	Arena Coliseo, Mexico City, Mexico	
14	Loss	10–4	Cayetano Correa	TKO	4 (?)	1981-12-16	Mexico City, Mexico	
13	Win	10–3	Jesus Ramirez	KO	2 (?)	1981-06-06	Mexico City, Mexico	
12	Loss	9–3	Ricardo Peralta	KO	6 (?)	1980-12-20	Mérida, Mexico	
11	Win	9–2	Luis Armando Villalobos	TKO	7 (8)	1980-11-22	Arena Coliseo, Guadalajara, Mexico	
10	Win	8–2	Cayetano Correa	TKO	8 (10)	1980-10-09	Pavillón Azteca, Mexico City, Mexico	
9	Loss	7–2	Angel Mata	KO	2 (?)	1980-06-07	Naucalpan, Mexico	
8	Win	7–1	Maximo Guevara	KO	4 (8)	1980-05-24	Arena Coliseo, Guadalajara, Mexico	
7	Loss	6–1	Pedro Molina	DQ	3 (?)	1980-03-24	Mexico City, Mexico	
6	Win	6–0	Pedro Molina	KO	8 (?)	1980-02-16	Arena Coliseo, Mexico City, Mexico	
5	Win	5–0	Martin Morado	KO	5 (?)	1979-12-10	Los Mochis, Mexico	
4	Win	4–0	Juan Soto	TKO	2 (?)	1979-12-01	Arena Coliseo, Mexico City, Mexico	
3	Win	3–0	Lupe Martinez	PTS	6 (6)	1979-10-10	Mexico City, Mexico	
2	Win	2–0	Juan Soto	TKO	3 (?)	1979-08-18	Mexico City, Mexico	
1	Win	1–0	Mario Castelan	TKO	4 (4)	1979-07-14	Mexico City, Mexico	

== See also ==
- List of Mexican boxing world champions
- List of world lightweight boxing champions

Sporting positions
World boxing titles
Inaugural champion	WBO lightweight champion May 6, 1989 – September 22, 1990	Succeeded by Dingaan Thobela
