= Alfredo Layne =

Panamanian boxer (1959–1996)

Personal information
- Nickname: Preciso
- Born: Alfredo Layne; October 9, 1959 Panama City, Panama Estado civil Casado Nidia de Layne
- Died: June 25, 1999 (aged 39)
- Weight: Super featherweight

Boxing career

Boxing record
- Total fights: 28
- Wins: 15
- Win by KO: 12
- Losses: 12
- No contests: 1

Alfredo Layne (October 9, 1959 – June 25, 1999) was a Panamanian professional boxer. Layne is notable for having won the WBA and lineal super featherweight titles.

== Professional boxing career ==
Layne, who began fighting professionally in 1981, fought in his first world title fight on May 24, 1986, as he travelled to San Juan to challenge the Puerto Rican world champion Wilfredo Gómez. Layne won the fight with a ninth round technical knockout to become the new WBA and Lineal champion. Layne's title reign was ended later in the year when he was beaten by Brian Mitchell in the first defence of his belt. Layne lost six out of his next seven fights, including a loss to Rafael Williams in December 1988, his final professional contest. Layne was shot dead in June 1999, aged 39.

== Professional boxing record ==
28 fights	15 wins	12 losses
By knockout	12	3
By decision	2	9
By disqualification	1	0
No contests	1	

No.	Result	Record	Opponent	Type	Round, time	Date	Location	Notes
28	Loss	15–12 (1)	Rafael Williams	PTS	10	Dec 17, 1988	Arena Panama Al Brown, Colon City, Panama	
27	Win	15–11 (1)	Ivan Vanegas	SD	10	Oct 8, 1988	Gimnasio Neco de la Guardia, Panama City, Panama	
26	Loss	14–11 (1)	Steve Larrimore	PTS	10	Jan 30, 1988	Nassau, Bahamas	
25	Loss	14–10 (1)	Carlos Sole	PTS	8	Dec 18, 1987	Madrid, Spain	
24	Loss	14–9 (1)	Amancio Castro	UD	10	Nov 27, 1987	Convention Center, Miami Beach, Florida, US	
23	Loss	14–8 (1)	Mauricio Aceves	TKO	5 (10), 1:59	Aug 29, 1987	Olympic Auditorium, Los Angeles, California, US	
22	Loss	14–7 (1)	Pernell Whitaker	UD	10	Dec 20, 1986	Scope Arena, Norfolk, Virginia, US	
21	Loss	14–6 (1)	Brian Mitchell	TKO	10 (15), 2:07	Sep 27, 1986	Superbowl, Sun City, South Africa	Lost WBA and The Ring super featherweight titles
20	Win	14–5 (1)	Wilfredo Gómez	TKO	9 (15), 0:32	May 24, 1986	Coliseo Roberto Clemente, San Juan, Puerto Rico	Won WBA and The Ring super featherweight titles
19	Win	13–5 (1)	Tomas Rodriguez	TKO	9 (10), 1:36	May 19, 1985	Coliseo Roberto Clemente, San Juan, Puerto Rico	
18	Loss	12–5 (1)	Kamel Bou Ali	TKO	6 (?)	Nov 17, 1984	Riva del Garda, Italy	
17	Win	12–4 (1)	Manuel Julio	TKO	4 (10), 2:09	Jul 14, 1984	Gimnasio Nuevo Panama, Panama City, Panama	
16	Win	11–4 (1)	Dennis Moran	KO	2 (10), 1:16	Feb 18, 1984	Gimnasio Nuevo Panama, Panama City, Panama	
15	Win	10–4 (1)	Jose Santana	TKO	6 (10), 2:28	Sep 17, 1983	Gimnasio Nuevo Panama, Panama City, Panama	
14	Win	9–4 (1)	Rudy Alpizar	TKO	9 (10)	Jul 16, 1983	Gimnasio Nuevo Panama, Panama City, Panama	
13	Win	8–4 (1)	Roberto Collins	TKO	2 (10)	Jun 11, 1983	Gimnasio Neco de la Guardia, Panama City, Panama	
12	Loss	7–4 (1)	Aquilino Asprilla	SD	12	Feb 5, 1983	Gimnasio Nuevo Panama, Panama City, Panama	For vacant Panamanian super featherweight title
11	Loss	7–3 (1)	Rafael Williams	PTS	10	Oct 16, 1982	Arena Panama Al Brown, Colon City, Panama	
10	Win	7–2 (1)	Alcibiades Blandon	TKO	7 (10), 0:20	Aug 14, 1982	Arena Panama Al Brown, Colon City, Panama	
9	Loss	6–2 (1)	Nelson Bolanos	PTS	10	Apr 23, 1982	Guayaquil, Ecuador	
8	NC	6–1 (1)	Alcibiades Blandon	NC	3 (10)	Mar 20, 1982	Gimnasio Nuevo Panama, Panama City, Panama	
7	Win	6–1	Isaac Moreno	TKO	3 (6)	Jan 16, 1982	Gimnasio Nuevo Panama, Panama City, Panama	
6	Win	5–1	Ezequiel Mosquera	UD	6	Oct 31, 1981	Arena Panama Al Brown, Colon City, Panama	
5	Win	4–1	Antonio Isaza	TKO	2 (8)	Aug 15, 1981	Gimnasio Nuevo Panama, Panama City, Panama	
4	Win	3–1	Marcos Vasquez	KO	2 (4)	Jul 18, 1981	Gimnasio Municipal, Santiago de Veraguas, Panama	
3	Win	2–1	Armando Quiroz	DQ	3 (4)	May 23, 1981	Gimnasio Neco de la Guardia, Panama City, Panama	
2	Win	1–1	Armando DeSedas	TKO	6 (6)	Apr 25, 1981	Gimnasio Neco de la Guardia, Panama City, Panama	
1	Loss	0–1	Alexander Sanchez	SD	4	Mar 29, 1981	Feria de San Jose, David, Panama	

== See also ==
- List of super featherweight boxing champions
- List of WBA world champions

Achievements
Preceded by Wilfredo Gómez	Lineal Super Featherweight Champion; 1986 May 24 – 1986 Sep 27	Succeeded by Brian Mitchell
Preceded by Wilfredo Gómez	WBA Super Featherweight Champion; 1986 May 24 – 1986 Sep 27	Succeeded by Brian Mitchell
