= Brian Mitchell (boxer) =

South African boxer (born 1961)

Personal information
- Born: Brian Mitchell; 30 August 1961 (age 65) Johannesburg, South Africa
- Height: 5 ft 6 in (168 cm)
- Weight: Super-featherweight

Boxing career
- Reach: 68 in (173 cm)
- Stance: Orthodox

Boxing record
- Total fights: 49
- Wins: 45
- Win by KO: 21
- Losses: 1
- Draws: 3

Brian Mitchell (born 30 August 1961) is a South African former professional boxer who competed from 1981 to 1995. He held the WBA super-featherweight title from 1986 to 1991, The Ring super-featherweight title from 1986 to 1988, and the IBF super-featherweight title from 1991 to 1992.

== Beginnings ==
Mitchell was born in Johannesburg, and began his career in late 1981, winning his first three fights on points over four rounds in less than two months. By the end of November he had won five times, defeating Simon Zondo and then Mose Mthiyane on fourth-round knockouts.

He began 1982 with a two-round KO of Phanuel Mosoane, but then suffered a setback, losing over 10 rounds to Jacob Morake. It would prove to be the only loss of his career, and left Mitchell's record at six wins and one defeat.

He won his next two fights, one on points and one by knockout, but was then held to a draw over six rounds by Frank Khonkhobe. In October 1982, he met Khonkhobe in a rematch and won on a 10-round decision.

In March 1983 Mitchell won an eight-round decision from Jerome Gumede, earning him a South African junior-lightweight title shot at Chris Whiteboy. He made the most of his opportunity, knocking Whiteboy out in the ninth round to claim the title. Bashew Sibaca lasted 10 rounds as Mitchell defended his crown, but Graham Gcola lasted just two rounds. Mitchell then met Jacob Morake, the only boxer to have beaten him in his young career. He won a points decision over 12 rounds. Fighting Frank Khonkhobe for the third time, Mitchell recorded a points victory. He finished 1983 with a first-round KO win over Blessing Ndlele.

Morake faced Mitchell for the third time in March 1984, and the champion again defended his South African title over 12 rounds. He then disposed of Carlos Miguel Rodriguez in four rounds, and won on points against Iland Matthews over six rounds. Nika Khumalo lasted only two rounds in his title challenge, and Mitchell then outpointed Aladin Stevens over eight rounds. Mitchell opened 1985 with a three-round KO win over Nyungi Mtiya, and then posted two seventh-round knockout wins in succession, defeating Carlos Rodriguez and Vicente Jorge. He improved his record to 25 wins, one loss and one draw when he beat Job Sisanga on points over eight rounds.

In his next bout, in November 1985, he faced Jacob Morake for the fourth time. It proved to be a tragic fight. Mitchell won on a twelfth-round KO, but Morake had absorbed a terrible amount of punishment and later died of head injuries.

Mitchell returned to the ring in March 1986, knocking out Julio Ruiz in six rounds at Sun City. In June of the same year, he defended his South African junior-lightweight title against Bushy Mosoeu, winning on points over 12 rounds.

== World title ==
In September he was given a crack at Alfredo Layne's world junior lightweight title in Sun City, South Africa. Mitchell seized his chance, dropping the Panamanian champion three times in the tenth round to win the title by knock-out. He next travelled to San Juan to tackle Jose Rivera, and after a tough battle emerged with a draw over 15 rounds. Less than two months later, he knocked out Aurelio Benitez in two rounds in a non-title bout. On 31 July, he faced Francisco Fernandez in Panama City and, with his excellent conditioning to the fore, knocked out the challenger in the fourteenth round. Mitchell was next in action in Gravelines, France, where he defeated Daniel Londas on points. He finished the year in Capo d'Orlando, Italy, with a ninth-round knockout of Salvatore Curcetti.

Mitchell took on Jose Rivera for the second time in April 1988 in Madrid. He again defended his title over the distance. In a non-title match he decisioned Danilo Cabrera over 10 rounds, and then outpointed Jim McDonnell over 12 rounds to defend his title for the sixth time.

In 1989 Mitchell headed to Italy, where he knocked out Salvatore Bottiglieri in eight rounds. Fighting in Italy once more, he saw off the challenge of Jackie Beard, and then disposed of his namesake, Irving Mitchell, in seven rounds in the USA. In his final fight of 1989, Mitchell defeated Felipe Orozco on points in a non-title match.

The following year he faced Beard again, winning a 12-round points decision in Italy. He then defeated Frank Mitchell, also over the distance, to maintain his hold on the junior-lightweight title.

In 1991 Mitchell travelled to Sacramento to face local hero Tony "The Tiger" Lopez arguably the toughest foe of his career. In a hometown decision that shocked boxing experts, Lopez managed to draw with Mitchell. The South African boxer was stripped of his WBA crown for facing Lopez for the IBF title, and suddenly he found himself without a world title for the first time since 1986. However, he again faced Lopez in Sacramento in September, and on that occasion made sure of victory with a convincing points win, claiming the IBF title in the process.

Mitchell retired from boxing after that fight, but came out of retirement for two more victories in 1994 and 1995 before permanently retiring from the ring.

He finished his career with 45 wins, a solitary loss and three draws. His 12 successful defences of the junior–lightweight title was only eclipsed by his countryman Vuyani Bungu who achieved the record of thirteen successful defences.

In rankings based on the formula of "the man who beat the man", Mitchell was rated the world's best junior-lightweight boxer from 1986 to his retirement in 1991. He proved his toughness by making 12 title defences on the road, and he proved his ability time after time when fighting for the world title.

Mitchell was inducted into the International Boxing Hall of Fame in 2009, and notwithstanding his exit from the amateur ranks in the early 80's, he was awarded honorary Springbok colours at a box–and-dine evening held at the Johannesburg City Hall in April 1989.

== Professional boxing record ==
49 fights	45 wins	1 loss
By knockout	21	0
By decision	24	1
Draws	3	

No.	Result	Record	Opponent	Type	Round, time	Date	Location	Notes
49	Win	45–1–3	Silverio Flores	UD	10	1 Apr 1995	Superbowl, Sun City, South Africa	
48	Win	44–1–3	Mike Evgen	RTD	6 (10)	26 Nov 1994	Superbowl, Sun City, South Africa	
47	Win	43–1–3	Tony Lopez	UD	12	13 Sep 1991	ARCO Arena, Sacramento, California, U.S.	Won IBF super-featherweight title
46	Draw	42–1–3	Tony Lopez	SD	12	15 Mar 1991	ARCO Arena, Sacramento, California, U.S.	Retained WBA super-featherweight title; For IBF super-featherweight title
45	Win	42–1–2	Frankie Mitchell	UD	12	29 Sep 1990	Palazzetto del Ghiaccio, Aosta, Italy	Retained WBA super-featherweight title
44	Win	41–1–2	Jackie Beard	UD	12	14 Mar 1990	Palazzetto dello Sport, Grosseto, Italy	Retained WBA super-featherweight title
43	Win	40–1–2	Felipe Orazco	SD	10	11 Nov 1989	Superbowl, Sun City, Bophuthatswana	
42	Win	39–1–2	Irving Mitchell	TKO	7 (12)	28 Sep 1989	Central Maine Civic Center, Lewiston, Maine, U.S.	Retained WBA super-featherweight title
41	Win	38–1–2	Jackie Beard	TD	9 (12)	2 Jul 1989	Stadio Ezio Scida, Crotone, Italy	Retained WBA super-featherweight title
40	Win	37–1–2	Salvatore Bottiglieri	TKO	8 (12)	11 Feb 1989	Palasport Guiseppi Valencia, Messina, Italy	Retained WBA super-featherweight title
39	Win	36–1–2	Jim McDonnell	UD	12	2 Nov 1988	Elephant & Castle Centre, London, United Kingdom	Retained WBA super-featherweight title
38	Win	35–1–2	Danilo Cabrera	UD	10	4 Jun 1988	Standard Bank Arena, Johannesburg, South Africa	
37	Win	34–1–2	Jose Rivera	UD	12	26 Apr 1988	Scalia Melia Castilla, Madrid, Spain	Retained WBA super-featherweight title
36	Win	33–1–2	Salvatore Curcetti	RTD	8 (12)	19 Dec 1987	Palazzo Dello Sport, Messina, Italy	Retained WBA super-featherweight title
35	Win	32–1–2	Daniel Londas	UD	15	3 Oct 1987	L'Espace International, Gravelines, France	Retained WBA super-featherweight title
34	Win	31–1–2	Francisco Fernandez	TKO	14 (15)	31 Jul 1987	Gimnasio Nuevo Panama, Panama City, Panama	Retained WBA super-featherweight title
33	Win	30–1–2	Aurelio Benitez	TKO	2 (10)	16 May 1987	Superbowl, Sun City, Bophuthatswana	
32	Draw	29–1–2	Jose Rivera	MD	15	27 Mar 1987	Roberto Clemente Coliseum, San Juan, Puerto Rico	Retained WBA and The Ring super-featherweight titles
31	Win	29–1–1	Alfredo Layne	TKO	10 (15)	27 Sep 1986	Superbowl, Sun City, Bophuthatswana	Won WBA and The Ring super-featherweight titles
30	Win	28–1–1	Bushy Mosoeu	UD	12	14 Jun 1986	Superbowl, Sun City, Bophuthatswana	Retained South African super-featherweight title
29	Win	27–1–1	Julio Pastor Ruiz	KO	6 (10)	1 Mar 1986	Superbowl, Sun City, Bophuthatswana	
28	Win	26–1–1	Jacob Morake	TKO	12 (12)	2 Nov 1985	Superbowl, Sun City, Bophuthatswana	Retained South African super-featherweight title Morake died of head injuries
27	Win	25–1–1	Job Sisanga	PTS	8	27 Jul 1985	Superbowl, Sun City, Bophuthatswana	
26	Win	24–1–1	Vincente Jorge	TKO	7 (10)	27 Apr 1985	Portuguese Hall, Johannesburg, South Africa	
25	Win	23–1–1	Carlos Rodriguez	RTD	6 (8)	30 Mar 1985	Superbowl, Sun City, Bophuthatswana	
24	Win	22–1–1	Nyingi Mtya	TKO	3 (12)	11 Feb 1985	Vosloorus Civic Centre, Boksburg, South Africa	Retained South African super-featherweight title
23	Win	21–1–1	Aladin Stevens	PTS	8	1 Dec 1984	Superbowl, Sun City, Bophuthatswana	
22	Win	20–1–1	Nika Khumalo	TKO	2 (12)	2 Aug 1984	Good Hope Centre, Cape Town, South Africa	Retained South African super-featherweight title
21	Win	19–1–1	Iland Mathews	PTS	6	16 Apr 1984	Joekies Ice Rink, Welkom, South Africa	
20	Win	18–1–1	Carlos Miguel	TKO	4 (10)	31 Mar 1984	Ellis Park Tennis Stadium, Johannesburg, South Africa	
19	Win	17–1–1	Jacob Morake	UD	12	2 Mar 1984	Kwa-Thema Civic Centre, Springs, South Africa	Retained South African super-featherweight title
18	Win	16–1–1	Blessing Ndlela	TKO	1 (8)	19 Dec 1983	West Ridge Park Tennis Stadium, Durban, South Africa	
17	Win	15–1–1	Frank Khonkhobe	UD	12	21 Nov 1983	Wembley Sports Pavilion, Johannesburg, South Africa	Retained South African super-featherweight title
16	Win	14–1–1	Jacob Morake	SD	12	6 Aug 1983	Wembley Sports Pavilion, Johannesburg, South Africa	Retained South African super-featherweight title
15	Win	13–1–1	Graham Gola	KO	2 (12)	27 Jun 1983	Wembley Sports Pavilion, Johannesburg, South Africa	Retained South African super-featherweight title
14	Win	12–1–1	Bashew Sibaca	PTS	10	2 May 1983	West Ridge Park Tennis Stadium, Durban, South Africa	
13	Win	11–1–1	Chris Whiteboy	TKO	9 (12)	9 Apr 1983	Oppenheimer Stadium, Orkney, South Africa	Won South African super-featherweight title
12	Win	10–1–1	Jerome Gumede	PTS	8	14 Mar 1983	West Ridge Park Tennis Stadium, Durban, South Africa	
11	Win	9–1–1	Frank Khonkhobe	SD	10	15 Oct 1982	Diepkloof Community Hall, Johannesburg, South Africa	
10	Draw	8–1–1	Frank Khonkhobe	PTS	6	30 Jul 1982	Mphatlalatsane Amphitheatre, Sebokeng, South Africa	
9	Win	8–1	Moses Sithebe	TKO	5 (6)	26 Jun 1982	Oppenheimer Stadium, Orkney South Africa	
8	Win	7–1	Joseph Tsotetsi	PTS	6	17 May 1982	Jack Eustace Hall, Johannesburg, South Africa	
7	Loss	6–1	Jacob Morake	UD	10	1 May 1982	Kwa-Thema Civic Centre, Springs, South Africa	For Transvaal super-featherweight title
6	Win	6–0	Phanuel Mosoane	TKO	2 (6)	6 Feb 1982	Rand Stadium, Johannesburg, South Africa	
5	Win	5–0	Moses Mthiyane	TKO	4 (6)	30 Nov 1981	West Ridge Park Tennis Stadium, Durban, South Africa	
4	Win	4–0	Simon Zondo	TKO	4 (6)	31 Oct 1981	Ellis Park Tennis Stadium, Johannesburg, South Africa	
3	Win	3–0	Tammy Mayisela	PTS	4	3 Oct 1981	Portuguese Hall, Johannesburg, South Africa	
2	Win	2–0	Bushy Mosoeu	PTS	4	19 Sep 1981	Wembley Sports Pavilion, Johannesburg, South Africa	
1	Win	1–0	Joseph Moneoane	PTS	4	15 Aug 1981	Ellis Park Tennis Stadium, Johannesburg, South Africa	

Sporting positions
World boxing titles
Preceded by Alfredo Layne	WBA super-featherweight champion 27 September 1986 – 25 April 1991; Stripped	Vacant Title next held by Joey Gamache
Preceded by Alfredo Layne	The Ring super-featherweight title 27 September 1986 – 1988; The Ring discontinued the title	Vacant Title next held by Manny Pacquiao
Vacant Title last held by Tony Lopez	IBF super-featherweight champion 13 September 1991 – 24 January 1992; Retired	Vacant Title next held by John John Molina
