= Tony Lopez (boxer) =

American boxer (born 1963)

Personal information
- Nickname: The Tiger
- Born: February 24, 1963 (age 63) Sacramento, California, U.S.
- Height: 5 ft 7 in (170 cm)
- Weight: Super featherweight; Lightweight; Light welterweight

Boxing career
- Reach: 70 in (178 cm)
- Stance: Orthodox

Boxing record
- Total fights: 59
- Wins: 50
- Win by KO: 34
- Losses: 8
- Draws: 1

Tony Lopez (born February 24, 1963) is an American former professional boxer who competed from 1983 to 1999. He is a world champion in two weight classes, having held the International Boxing Federation (IBF) super featherweight title twice between 1988 and 1991, and the World Boxing Association (WBA) lightweight from 1992 to 1993.

== Professional boxing record ==
59 fights	50 wins	8 losses
By knockout	34	4
By decision	16	3
By disqualification	0	1
Draws	1	

No.	Result	Record	Opponent	Type	Round, time	Date	Location	Notes
59	Loss	50–8–1	Hector Quiroz	TKO	1 (12), 2:54	Feb 20, 1999	Spotlight 29 Casino, Coachella, California, U.S.	Lost WBO-NABO light welterweight title
58	Win	50–7–1	Jaime Ocegueda	TKO	3 (12), 0:42	Sep 26, 1998	Caesars Tahoe, Stateline, Nevada, U.S.	Won WBO-NABO light welterweight title
57	Win	49–7–1	Horatio Garcia	UD	10	May 21, 1998	Memorial Auditorium, Sacramento, California, U.S.	
56	Win	48–7–1	Agustin Caballero	UD	8	Mar 27, 1998	Marin Center Exhibit Hall, San Rafael, California, U.S.	
55	Win	47–7–1	Juan Yoani Cervantes	UD	10	Aug 9, 1997	Memorial Auditorium, Sacramento, California, U.S.	
54	Win	46–7–1	Wilberforce Kiggundu	TKO	9 (10)	May 30, 1997	Longshormen's Hall, San Francisco, California, U.S.	
53	Loss	45–7–1	Charles Murray	UD	12	Mar 26, 1996	Blue Cross Arena, Rochester, New York, U.S.	For NABF light welterweight title
52	Loss	45–6–1	Freddie Pendleton	TKO	8 (12), 0:43	Aug 12, 1995	MGM Grand, Las Vegas, Nevada, U.S.	For IBF-USBA light welterweight title
51	Loss	45–5–1	Julio César Chávez	TKO	10 (12), 1:41	Dec 10, 1994	Estadio de Beisbol, Monterrey, Nuevo León, Mexico	For WBC light welterweight title
50	Win	45–4–1	Greg Haugen	TKO	10 (10), 1:43	Jun 25, 1994	MGM Grand Garden Arena, Las Vegas, Nevada, U.S.	
49	Win	44–4–1	Amancio Castro	TKO	2 (10), 2:17	Dec 18, 1993	Caesars Tahoe, Stateline, Nevada, U.S.	
48	Win	43–4–1	Larry LaCoursiere	TKO	5 (10), 2:47	Oct 16, 1993	Caesars Tahoe, Stateline, Nevada, U.S.	
47	Loss	42–4–1	Dingaan Thobela	UD	12	Jun 26, 1993	Superbowl, Sun City, South Africa	Lost WBA lightweight title
46	Win	42–3–1	Dingaan Thobela	UD	12	Feb 12, 1993	ARCO Arena, Sacramento, California, U.S.	Retained WBA lightweight title
45	Win	41–3–1	Joey Gamache	TKO	10 (12), 2:40	Oct 24, 1992	Cumberland County Civic Center, Portland, Ohio, U.S.	Won WBA lightweight title
44	Win	40–3–1	Andres Sandoval	TKO	2 (10)	Jun 30, 1992	ARCO Arena, Sacramento, California, U.S.	
43	Win	39–3–1	Narciso Valenzuela Romo	KO	2 (10), 2:55	Apr 24, 1992	ARCO Arena, Sacramento, California, U.S.	
42	Win	38–3–1	Ditau Molefyane	TKO	8 (10), 2:41	Nov 15, 1991	ARCO Arena, Sacramento, California, U.S.	
41	Loss	37–3–1	Brian Mitchell	UD	12	Sep 13, 1991	ARCO Arena, Sacramento, California, U.S.	Lost IBF super featherweight title
40	Win	37–2–1	Lupe Gutierrez	TKO	6 (12), 2:42	Jul 12, 1991	Caesars Tahoe, Stateline, Nevada, U.S.	Retained IBF super featherweight title
39	Draw	36–2–1	Brian Mitchell	SD	12	Mar 15, 1991	ARCO Arena, Sacramento, California, U.S.	Retained IBF super featherweight title; For WBA super featherweight title
38	Win	36–2	Jorge Páez	UD	12	Sep 22, 1990	ARCO Arena, Sacramento, California, U.S.	Retained IBF super featherweight title
37	Win	35–2	John John Molina	SD	12	May 20, 1990	Lawlor Events Center, Reno, Nevada, U.S.	Won IBF super featherweight title
36	Win	34–2	Sylvester Kennon	TKO	2 (10), 2:10	Mar 30, 1990	ARCO Arena, Sacramento, California, U.S.	
35	Loss	33–2	John John Molina	TKO	10 (12), 2:40	Oct 7, 1989	ARCO Arena, Sacramento, California, U.S.	Lost IBF super featherweight title
34	Win	33–1	Tyrone Jackson	TKO	8 (12), 2:46	Jun 18, 1989	Caesars Tahoe, Stateline, Nevada, U.S.	Retained IBF super featherweight title
33	Win	32–1	Rocky Lockridge	UD	12	Mar 5, 1988	ARCO Arena, Sacramento, California, U.S.	Retained IBF super featherweight title
32	Win	31–1	John John Molina	UD	12	Oct 27, 1988	ARCO Arena, Sacramento, California, U.S.	Retained IBF super featherweight title
31	Win	30–1	Rocky Lockridge	UD	12	Jul 23, 1988	ARCO Arena, Sacramento, California, U.S.	Won IBF super featherweight title
30	Win	29–1	Tony Pep	TKO	3 (10), 2:48	Mar 25, 1988	ARCO Arena, Sacramento, California, U.S.	
29	Win	28–1	Gerardo Velasquez	TKO	3 (10), 0:39	Dec 16, 1987	ARCO Arena, Sacramento, California, U.S.	
28	Win	27–1	Ramon Rico	KO	3 (10), 0:35	Sep 25, 1987	ARCO Arena, Sacramento, California, U.S.	
27	Loss	26–1	Ramon Rico	DQ	7 (10)	Sep 1, 1987	ARCO Arena, Sacramento, California, U.S.	
26	Win	26–0	Pedro Nolasco	TKO	8 (10), 0:48	Jul 1, 1987	ARCO Arena, Sacramento, California, U.S.	
25	Win	25–0	Pedro Nolasco	TKO	10 (10), 0:57	May 21, 1987	ARCO Arena, Sacramento, California, U.S.	
24	Win	24–0	Tommy Cordova	UD	10	Feb 15, 1987	ARCO Arena, Sacramento, California, U.S.	
23	Win	23–0	Heriberto Chavez	TKO	2 (10), 0:47	Dec 5, 1986	Caesars Tahoe, Stateline, Nevada, U.S.	
22	Win	22–0	Roberto Cantu	TKO	3 (10), 2:42	Nov 7, 1986	Caesars Tahoe, Stateline, Nevada, U.S.	
21	Win	21–0	Rigoberto Garcia	TKO	4 (10), 1:58	Sep 27, 1986	Caesars Tahoe, Stateline, Nevada, U.S.	
20	Win	20–0	Cesar Zepeda	TKO	3 (10), 2:53	Aug 26, 1986	Caesars Tahoe, Stateline, Nevada, U.S.	
19	Win	19–0	Tim Brooks	UD	10	Jul 20, 1986	Caesars Tahoe, Stateline, Nevada, U.S.	
18	Win	18–0	Arnel Arrozal	KO	2 (10), 2:15	Jun 5, 1986	ARCO Arena, Sacramento, California, U.S.	
17	Win	17–0	Roberto Cantu	UD	10	Mar 3, 1986	ARCO Arena, Sacramento, California, U.S.	
16	Win	16–0	Adam Garcia	PTS	10	Dec 18, 1985	ARCO Arena, Sacramento, California, U.S.	
15	Win	15–0	Roman Almaguer	TKO	3 (10), 2:42	Oct 4, 1985	ARCO Arena, Sacramento, California, U.S.	
14	Win	14–0	Dave De La Rosa	TKO	3 (8), 2:12	Aug 15, 1985	Memorial Auditorium, Sacramento, California, U.S.	
13	Win	13–0	J T Walker	TKO	4 (10), 1:45	Jun 18, 1985	Memorial Auditorium, Sacramento, California, U.S.	
12	Win	12–0	Mariano Bautista	TKO	4 (8), 2:40	Apr 2, 1985	Memorial Auditorium, Sacramento, California, U.S.	
11	Win	11–0	Tim Brooks	UD	6	Aug 3, 1984	MGM Grand Hotel, Reno, Nevada, U.S.	
10	Win	10–0	Sam Espinosa	TKO	4 (?)	Apr 3, 1984	Memorial Auditorium, Sacramento, California, U.S.	
9	Win	9–0	Guillermo Rojas	TKO	2 (8)	Mar 6, 1984	Memorial Auditorium, Sacramento, California, U.S.	
8	Win	8–0	Juan Torres	RTD	3 (6)	Nov 29, 1983	Memorial Auditorium, Sacramento, California, U.S.	
7	Win	7–0	Ruben Perales	KO	1 (6), 2:02	Nov 15, 1983	Memorial Auditorium, Sacramento, California, U.S.	
6	Win	6–0	Juan Rivera	Ko	1 (6)	Nov 1, 1983	Memorial Auditorium, Sacramento, California, U.S.	
5	Win	5–0	Leo Benitez	UD	4	Aug 9, 1983	Memorial Auditorium, Sacramento, California, U.S.	
4	Win	4–0	Gerald Issack	UD	6	Jul 12, 1983	Memorial Auditorium, Sacramento, California, U.S.	
3	Win	3–0	Joe Cruz	KO	4 (4), 0:38	Jun 28, 1983	Memorial Auditorium, Sacramento, California, U.S.	
2	win	2–0	Edgar Acosta	KO	1 (6)	Jun 21, 1983	Memorial Auditorium, Sacramento, California, U.S.	
1	win	1–0	Juan Rodriguez	TKO	1 (5), 1:30	May 3, 1983	Memorial Auditorium, Sacramento, California, U.S.	

== Titles in boxing ==
=== Major world titles ===
- IBF super featherweight champion (130 lbs) (2x)
- WBA lightweight champion (135 lbs)

=== Regional/International titles ===
- WBO-NABO light welterweight champion (140 lbs)

Sporting positions
Regional boxing titles
Vacant Title last held by Héctor López	WBO-NABO light welterweight champion September 26, 1998 – February 20, 1999	Succeeded by Hector Quiroz
World boxing titles
Preceded by Rocky Lockridge	IBF super featherweight champion July 23, 1988 – October 7, 1989	Succeeded by John John Molina
Preceded by John John Molina	IBF super featherweight champion May 20, 1990 – September 13, 1991	Succeeded by Brian Mitchell
Preceded by Joey Gamache	WBA lightweight champion October 24, 1992 – June 26, 1993	Succeeded by Dingaan Thobela
Awards
Preceded by Sugar Ray Leonard W12; Marvelous Marvin Hagler	The Ring Fight of the year 1988 (W12 Rocky Lockridge)	Succeeded by Roberto Durán W12 Iran Barkley
Preceded by Roberto Durán	The Ring Magazine Comeback of the Year; 1990	Succeeded by Vinny Paz
