= John John Molina =

Puerto Rican boxer (born 1965)

Personal information
- Nickname: John John
- Nationality: Puerto Rican
- Born: Juan A. Molina; March 17, 1965 (age 61) Fajardo, Puerto Rico
- Height: 5 ft 7 in (170 cm)
- Weight: Lightweight; Super featherweight

Boxing career
- Reach: 67 in (170 cm)
- Stance: Orthodox

Boxing record
- Total fights: 59
- Wins: 52
- Win by KO: 33
- Losses: 7
Medal record
Men's amateur boxing
Representing Puerto Rico
World Cup
Gold medal – first place	1985 Seoul	Featherweight

Juan Molina (born March 17, 1965), better known as John John Molina in the world of boxing, is a former boxer whose career transcended boxing in Puerto Rico. A multiple time world champion, this boxer was also known as quite a socialite. Molina is a native of Fajardo, Puerto Rico.

== Amateur career ==
Molina represented Puerto Rico as a Bantamweight at the 1984 Los Angeles Olympic Games. His results were:

- 1st round bye
- Defeated Jarmo Eskelinen (Finland) 5-0
- Lost to Pedro Nolasco (Dominican Republic) 2-3

Molina won the Boxing World Cup in Seoul, South Korea, November 1985, by knocking out Kelcie Banks in the finals. Upon returning to Puerto Rico, the 20-year-old youngster announced to Rafael Bracero on TV he would be ready to fight professional world Featherweight champion Victor Luvi Callejas within a year. That wasn't to happen, however.

== Professional career ==
Molina started as a professional on February 25, 1986, beating Job Walters by a decision in four. His first three fights were decisions. He won his first 14 bouts, nine of them by knockout. Among the people he beat during that span was Victor Aponte, who was a stablemate of both Alberto Mercado and Juan Carazo. Aponte got knocked out by Molina in the 10th and final round. During this period of his career, Molina received much television exposure in Puerto Rico, many of his fights being shown on TV by producer and fight commentator Ivonne Class and her Video Deportes company.

Then, he faced Lupe Suarez, losing for the first time, when he was knocked out in the ninth round. Immediately after suffering his first loss, he embarked on a five-fight win streak, including a disqualification win in four rounds over former Hector Camacho world title challenger Rafael Solis, and a knockout in eight over Miguel Medina. After those two wins, he was ranked as the number one challenger by the IBF.

On October 27, 1988, Molina was at The Arco Arena in Sacramento, to challenge the IBF super featherweight champion Tony Lopez, in what marked the beginning of a three-fight rivalry between Molina and Lopez. Molina dropped Lopez in round two, but Lopez went on to retain the title by a split decision.

In his next fight, April 29, 1989, the WBO put him and former WBC featherweight champion Juan Laporte against each other for the vacant WBO super featherweight title. Molina became a world champion by beating Laporte by a 12-round unanimous decision at Roberto Clemente Coliseum in San Juan.

=== First IBF world title ===
in September 1989, he returned to Arco Arena to resume his rivalry with Lopez. Molina won the IBF belt by knocking Lopez out in the tenth round.

On January 28, 1990, he avenged his loss to Suarez by knocking him out in the sixth round to retain the belt, but then, on May 20 of that year, he and Lopez met for their rubber match, this time in Reno. Lopez dropped Molina and won a unanimous decision to recover his status as world Jr. Lightweight champion.

=== Rebuilding ===
Between 1990 and 1992, Molina won five straight fights, four by knockout.

=== Second title reign ===
In early 1992, after Brian Mitchell (who had beaten Lopez), left the IBF title vacant due to retirement, Molina travelled to South Africa, where he met Jackie Gunguzula for the vacant world title. He knocked Gunguzula out in the fourth round to become world champion once again, and, days later, he was the object of a large welcoming at Luis Muñoz Marín International Airport in San Juan. During this period of his reign, Molina made seven defenses, beating challengers like Bernard Taylor, Floyd Havard, Wilson Rodriguez, former world Featherweight champion Gregorio Vargas and future world Featherweight champion Manuel "Mantecas" Medina, among others.

Around then, he became quite known by the mainstream Puerto Rican public, becoming one of the first boxers ever to be portrayed on the cover of Vea magazine, and dating a famous model.

=== De La Hoya vs. Molina ===
Molina then moved up in weight to challenge the WBO lightweight champion Oscar De La Hoya, losing by a unanimous decision in 12 rounds in an HBO Boxing televised event.

=== Latter career ===
After that, Molina engaged in a series of fights against mostly lower-level opposition for the next two years, and he grew frustrated over the fact that his opposition level was being downgraded by promoters after the fight with de la Hoya. He won his next nine bouts, but the only two opponents that can probably be called respectable names in his list of opponents during that span were Jaime "Rocky" Balboa, beaten by decision in ten, and Isaac Cruz, beaten by a disqualification in four.

On May 9, 1998, Molina was given a second chance at a world lightweight championship, when he met IBF champion Sugar Shane Mosley, in Molina's second HBO fight. Mosley retained the title by a knockout in the eighth round, and Molina went back to the super featherweight division.

His next fight was also for the world title, but he had to wait nine months for that fight. In February 1999, he faced IBF super featherweight champion Robert Garcia, dropping the champion in their pay per view event but losing a 12-round decision in what turned out to be his last world title fight.

Molina wasn't done with boxing, and he went on to win seven more fights in a row, including two decision wins, one of which was televised by the USA Network over Emanuel Burton, and another one over future Kostya Tszyu world title challenger Ben Tackie, which was on the undercard of the Lennox Lewis vs. David Tua fight's pay per view program.

His last fight was a T.K.O. loss to Mexican Juan Lazcano, Molina retired from boxing after the fight.

== Professional boxing record ==
59 fights	52 wins	7 losses
By knockout	33	3
By decision	17	4
By disqualification	2	0

No.	Result	Record	Opponent	Type	Round, time	Date	Location	Notes
59	Loss	52–7	Juan Lazcano	TKO	11 (12), 1:06	May 5, 2001	Don Haskins Center, El Paso, Texas, U.S.	For NABF and vacant IBA lightweight titles
58	Win	52–6	Ben Tackie	SD	10	Nov 11, 2000	Mandalay Bay, Paradise, Nevada, U.S.	
57	Win	51–6	Emanuel Augustus	UD	10	May 12, 2000	Miccosukee Indian Gaming Resort, Miami, Florida, U.S.	
56	Win	50–6	Juan Carlos Suárez	TKO	8 (12), 1:07	Feb 16, 2000	Miccosukee Indian Gaming Resort, Miami, Florida, U.S.	Won vacant WBC FECARBOX super featherweight title
55	Win	49–6	Manuel Garnica	UD	10	Nov 14, 1999	Rose Garden, Portland, Oregon, U.S.	
54	Win	48–6	Javier Carmona	KO	1 (10), 2:59	Oct 20, 1999	Grand Victoria Casino, Elgin, Illinois, U.S.	
53	Win	47–6	James Crayton	UD	10	Jul 16, 1999	Boardwalk Hall, Atlantic City, New Jersey, U.S.	
52	Win	46–6	Ruben Nevarez	TKO	7 (12), 1:06	Mar 20, 199	New Frontier Hotel, Paradise, Nevada, U.S.	Won vacant WBC Continental Americas lightweight title
51	Loss	45–6	Robert Garcia	UD	12	Jan 16, 1999	MGM Grand Garden Arena, Paradise, Nevada, U.S.	For IBF super featherweight title
50	Loss	45–5	Shane Mosley	TKO	8 (12), 2:27	May 9, 1998	Trump Taj Mahal, Atlantic City, New Jersey, U.S.	For IBF lightweight title
49	Win	45–4	Alex Pérez	TKO	8 (10)	Dec 14, 1997	Fajardo, Puerto Rico	
48	Win	44–4	Moses James	UD	10	Nov 11, 1997	Memorial Auditorium, Fort Lauderdale, Florida, U.S.	
47	Win	43–4	Joey Negron	RTD	6 (10)	Oct 2, 1997	Miccosukee Indian Gaming Resort, Miami, Florida, U.S.	
46	Win	42–4	Elías Quiroz	TKO	6 (10)	May 31, 1997	Coliseo Tomás Donés, Fajardo, Puerto Rico	
45	Win	41–4	Isaac Cruz	DQ	4 (10), 2:30	Mar 22, 1997	Condado, San Juan, Puerto Rico	
44	Win	40–4	James Crayton	UD	10	Jan 18, 1997	Condado, San Juan, Puerto Rico	
43	Win	39–4	Jaime Balboa	UD	10	Apr 10, 1996	Metro Plex Center, Youngstown, Ohio, U.S.	
42	Win	38–4	Eduardo Pérez	TKO	6 (12), 1:19	Dec 1, 1995	Fantasy Springs Casino, Indio, California, U.S.	
41	Win	37–4	Mark Reels	PTS	10	May 8, 1995	Condado, San Juan, Puerto Rico	
40	Loss	36–4	Oscar De La Hoya	UD	12	Feb 18, 1995	MGM Grand Garden Arena, Paradise, Nevada, U.S.	For WBO lightweight title
39	Win	36–3	Wilson Rodriguez	KO	10 (12), 1:41	Nov 26, 1994	Coliseo Rubén Rodríguez, Bayamón, Puerto Rico	Retained IBF super featherweight title
38	Win	35–3	Gregorio Vargas	UD	12	Apr 22, 1994	Caesars Palace, Paradise, Nevada, U.S.	Retained IBF super featherweight title
37	Win	34–3	Floyd Havard	RTD	6 (12), 3:00	Jan 22, 1994	Welsh Institute of Sport, Cardiff, Wales	Retained IBF super featherweight title
36	Win	33–3	Bernard Taylor	TKO	8 (12), 1:00	Oct 9, 1993	Convention Center Condado, San Juan, Puerto Rico	Retained IBF super featherweight title
35	Win	32–3	Manuel Medina	UD	12	Jun 26, 1993	Convention Center, Atlantic City, New Jersey, U.S.	Retained IBF super featherweight title
34	Win	31–3	Tony Duran	TKO	3	May 14, 1993	Fajardo, Puerto Rico	
33	Win	30–3	Francisco Segura	TKO	8 (12), 2:24	Feb 13, 1993	Coliseo Roberte Clemente, San Juan, Puerto Rico	Retained IBF super featherweight title
32	Win	29–3	Fernando Caicedo	TKO	4 (12), 0:38	Aug 22, 1992	Coliseo Rubén Rodríguez, Bayamón, Puerto Rico	Retained IBF super featherweight title
31	Win	28–3	Donnie Parker	KO	7	Jul 2, 1992	Isla Verde, Carolina, Puerto Rico	
30	Win	27–3	Jackie Gunguluza	TKO	4 (12), 2:56	Feb 22, 1992	Superbowl, Sun City, South Africa	Won vacant IBF super featherweight title
29	Win	26–3	Francisco Ortiz	TKO	2	Jan 14, 1992	San Juan, Puerto Rico	
28	Win	25–3	Rowdy Welch	PTS	10	Sep 13, 1991	Arco Arena, Sacramento, California, U.S.	
27	Win	24–3	Darryl Richardson	TKO	3	Jul 27, 1991	Scope Arena, Norfolk, Virginia, U.S.	
26	Win	23–3	Víctor Aponte	TKO	4	Jun 29, 1991	San Juan, Puerto Rico	
25	Win	22–3	Mario Gómez	TKO	3 (10), 0:52	Nov 3, 1990	Fajardo, Puerto Rico	
24	Loss	21–3	Tony Lopez	SD	12	May 20, 1990	Lawlor Events Center, Reno, Nevada, U.S.	Lost IBF super featherweight title
23	Win	21–2	Lupe Suárez	TKO	6 (12), 2:43	Jan 28, 1990	Trump Plaza Hotel, Atlantic City, New Jersey, U.S.	Retained IBF super featherweight title
22	Win	20–2	Tony Lopez	TKO	10 (12), 2:41	Oct 7, 1989	Arco Arena, Sacramento, California, U.S.	Won IBF super featherweight title
21	Win	19–2	Juan Laporte	UD	12	Apr 29, 1989	Coliseo Roberte Clemente, San Juan, Puerto Rico	Won inaugural WBO super featherweight title
20	Loss	18–2	Tony Lopez	UD	12	Oct 27, 1988	Arco Arena, Sacramento, California, U.S.	For IBF super featherweight title
19	Win	18–1	Miguel Medina	TKO	8 (10), 1:11	Jul 16, 1988	Caesars Tahoe, Stateline, Nevada, U.S.	
18	Win	17–1	Rafael Solis	DQ	4	Jun 6, 1988	Hotel Sands, Carolina, Puerto Rico	
17	Win	16–1	Fernando Maldonado	TKO	4	Nov 28, 1987	Coliseo Roberto Clemente, San Juan, Puerto Rico	
16	Win	15–1	Richard Campbell	KO	4	Jul 25, 1987	Scope Arena, Norfolk, Virginia, U.S.	
15	Loss	14–1	Lupe Suárez	TKO	9 (10), 2:01	May 24, 1987	Memorial Coliseum, Corpus Christi, Texas, U.S.	
14	Win	14–0	Víctor Aponte	TKO	10 (10)	Mar 19, 1987	Hotel San Juan, Carolina, Puerto Rico	
13	Win	13–0	Chris Silvas	KO	3 (8), 2:14	Feb 8, 1987	Civic Center, Providence, Rhode Island, U.S.	
12	Win	12–0	Carlos Albuerne	TKO	3 (8)	Dec 20, 1986	Scope Arena, Norfolk, Virginia, U.S.	
11	Win	11–0	Kevin Marston	UD	8	Dec 11, 1986	Felt Forum, New York City, New York, U.S.	
10	Win	10–0	Norís Gautier	KO	1 (8)	Nov 8, 1986	Hotel San Juan, Carolina, Puerto Rico	
9	Win	9–0	Na'eem Muhammad	KO	1, 2:59	Aug 16, 1986	Sands Casino Hotel, Atlantic City, New Jersey, U.S.	
8	Win	8–0	Don Foster	TKO	1 (6), 1:33	Jul 12, 1986	The Omni, Atlanta, Georgia, U.S.	
7	Win	7–0	Floyd Simmons	KO	2	Jun 21, 1986	Sands Casino Hotel, Atlantic City, New Jersey, U.S.	
6	Win	6–0	Jose Gonzales	RTD	5 (8)	May 24, 1986	Coliseo Roberto Clemente, San Juan, Puerto Rico	
5	Win	5–0	Job Walters	PTS	6	Apr 12, 1986	Ice World, Passaic, New Jersey, U.S.	
4	Win	4–0	John Wesley	TKO	1 (4), 2:36	Apr 3, 1986	Felt Forum, New York City, New York, U.S.	
3	Win	3–0	Darrell Jacobs	UD	4	Mar 9, 1986	Coliseum, Hampton, Virginia, U.S.	
2	Win	2–0	Ricky West	UD	4	Mar 2, 1986	Lancaster Hotel Resort, Lancaster, Pennsylvania, U.S.	
1	Win	1–0	Job Walters	MD	4	Feb 25, 1986	Harrah's Marina Hotel Casino, Atlantic City, New Jersey, U.S.	

== See also ==
- List of Puerto Ricans
- List of Puerto Rican boxing world champions
- List of super-featherweight boxing champions

Sporting positions
Minor world boxing titles
Inaugural Champion	WBO super featherweight champion April 29, 1989 – October 15, 1989; Stripped	Vacant Title next held by Kamel Bou-Ali
World boxing titles
Preceded by Tony Lopez	IBF super featherweight champion October 7, 1989 – May 20, 1990	Succeeded by Tony Lopez
Vacant Title last held by Brian Mitchell	IBF super featherweight champion February 22, 1992 – February 20, 1995; Vacated	Vacant Title next held by Eddie Hopson
