= JaRico O'Quinn =

American boxer (born 1995)

Personal information
- Nickname: Great Lakes King
- Born: April 22, 1995 (age 31) Detroit, Michigan, U.S.
- Height: 5 ft 6 in (168 cm)
- Weight: Bantamweight

Boxing career
- Reach: 67 in (170 cm)

Boxing record
- Total fights: 19
- Wins: 17
- Win by KO: 9
- Losses: 1
- Draws: 1
Medal record
Men's boxing
Representing United States
2014 U.S. National Championship
Gold medal – first place	U.S. National Championship	Bantamweight

Jarico Joseph O'Quinn (born April 22, 1995) is an American professional boxer competing in the Bantamweight division.

== Boxing career ==
=== Amateur career ===
O'Quinn won the USA National Championship at bantamweight in 2014 in Spokane, Washington. He also won the 2013 USA Boxing Youth National Championship.

=== Early professional career ===
O'Quinn made his professional debut against Hoy Mack on April 10, 2015. He won the fight by a first-round retirement. He amassed a 12-0-1 record over the course of the next four years, with eight stoppage victories, before being scheduled to face James Smith for the vacant WBO International super flyweight title on October 5, 2019, at the Dort Federal Credit Union Event Center in Flint, Michigan. O'Quinn won the fight by unanimous decision, with all three judges awarding him a 96-93 scorecard.

O'Quinn was scheduled to face Oscar Vasquez at the WinnaVegas Casino & Resort in Sloan, Iowa on January 17, 2020. He won the fight by unanimous decision, with all three judges scoring the fight 79-73 in his favor.

O'Quinn was scheduled to face Saul Sanchez in the main event of the three-fight "ShoBox: The New Generation" card. The card was scheduled for September 24, 2021 at the Central Park Community Center in Broken Arrow, Oklahoma. He lost the fight by a first-round technical knockout. O'Quinn was knocked down three times in under two minutes, which prompted referee Gary Ritter to stop the fight.

O'Quinn is scheduled to face Jobert Alvarez on the undercard of a UFC Fight Pass broadcast event on April 15, 2022. He won the fight by unanimous decision, with all three judges scoring the bout 80–72 in his favor.

== 2024 ==
On April 27, 2024 in Liverpool, England, O'Quinn was scheduled to face Peter McGrail in a rematch.

== Boxing record ==
19 fights	17 wins	1 loss
By knockout	9	1
By decision	8	0
Draws	1	

No.	Result	Record	Opponent	Type	Round, Time	Date	Location	Notes
19	Win	17–1–1	Peter McGrail	KO	5 (10), 2:19	16 Dec 2023	Desert Diamond Arena, Glendale, Arizona	
18	Win	16–1–1	Carlos Mujica	UD	10	Jul 15, 2023	Detroit Masonic Temple, Detroit, U.S.	
17	Win	15–1–1	Jobert Alvarez	UD	8	Apr 15, 2022	Garden Theater, Detroit, U.S.	
16	Loss	14–1–1	Saul Sanchez	TKO	1 (10), 1:58	Sep 24, 2021	Central Park Community Center, Broken Arrow, Oklahoma, U.S.	
15	Win	14–0–1	Oscar Vasquez	UD	8	Jan 17, 2020	WinnaVegas Casino & Resort, Sloan, Iowa, U.S.	
14	Win	13–0–1	James Smith	UD	10	Oct 5, 2019	Dort Federal Credit Union Event Center, Flint, Michigan, U.S.	Won vacant WBO International super-flyweight title
13	Win	12–0–1	Vicente Alfaro Martinez	UD	8	Apr 13, 2019	Boardwalk Hall, Atlantic City, New Jersey, U.S.	
12	Win	11–0–1	Alex Rangel	TKO	3 (8), 2:38	Feb 8, 2019	Motor City Casino, Detroit, U.S.	
11	Win	10–0–1	Christian Esquivel	TKO	2 (6), 2:56	Oct 26, 2018	Motor City Casino, Detroit, U.S.	
10	Win	9–0–1	Yaqub Kareem	TKO	4 (8), 1:10	Jun 22, 2018	Detroit Masonic Temple, Detroit, U.S.	
9	Win	8–0–1	Nick Otieno	UD	6	Feb 23, 2018	DeCarlo's Convention Center, Warren, Michigan, U.S.	
8	Draw	7–0–1	Jose Elizondo	MD	6	Aug 4, 2017	MGM Grand Detroit, Detroit, U.S.	
7	Win	7–0	David Martino	UD	6	Jun 16, 2017	Detroit Masonic Temple, Detroit, U.S.	
6	Win	6–0	Szilveszter Kanalas	KO	1 (6), 1:23	Mar 10, 2017	MGM Grand Detroit, Detroit, U.S.	
5	Win	5–0	Angel Carvajal	TKO	3 (6), 2:34	Jan 22, 2017	Detroit Masonic Temple, Detroit, U.S.	
4	Win	4–0	Robert Allen Jr	KO	1 (4), 1:30	Nov 12, 2016	Detroit Masonic Temple, Detroit, U.S.	
3	Win	3–0	Jonathan Quiroz	UD	4	Aug 5, 2016	Pechanga Resort & Casino, Temecula, California, U.S.	
2	Win	2–0	Sergio Aguilar	RTD	2 (4), 3:00	Jul 16, 2016	Detroit Masonic Temple, Detroit, U.S.	
1	Win	1–0	Hoy Mack	RTD	1 (4), 3:00	Apr 10, 2015	Detroit Masonic Temple, Detroit, U.S.	
