= Rafael Solis (boxer) =

Puerto Rican boxer (born 1958)

Rafael Solis De Jesus (born 29 January 1958, in Río Piedras, Puerto Rico) is a former junior lightweight boxer from Puerto Rico. He was raised in the barrio of Camito. Rafael trained at the Caimito Gym, and also frequented the Bairoa Gym.

Solis is the brother of Enrique Solis, Santos Solis and former world bantamweight champion Julian Solís. He is the son of Jose Julian Solis and Gloria De Jesus.

Solis had a successful boxing career, fighting in many Latin American countries, such as Venezuela, Dominican Republic and others.

On October 2, 1982, Solis won the Fecarbox (Central American Professional Boxing Federation) super featherweight title, knocking out Aquilino Asprilla in the 6th round. On November 18, 1983, he challenged Héctor Camacho for the WBC's world Jr. Lightweight title. In what was the second time two Puerto Rican fighters fought each other for a world title (the first time was Benitez vs. Santos in 1981), Solis lost to Camacho by knockout in round five at Roberto Clemente Coliseum.

Solis last boxed in 1995 and retired with a record of 30 wins (20 by knockout), 13 losses (11 by knockout), and 2 draws.

== Personal ==
He has a son, Rafael, Jr.

== Honors ==
In 2014, he was inducted into the Rio Piedras Sports Hall of Fame.

== Professional boxing record ==
47 fights	30 wins	13 losses
By knockout	20	11
By decision	10	1
By disqualification	0	1
Draws	2	
No contests	2	

No.	Result	Record	Opponent	Type	Round, Time	Date	Location	Notes
47	Loss	30–13–2 (2)	Víctor Pérez	TKO	1 (?)	Oct 22, 1995	San Juan, Puerto Rico	
46	Loss	30–12–2 (2)	Santos Cardona	TKO	2 (?)	Jul 31, 1993	Guaynabo, Puerto Rico	
45	Loss	30–11–2 (2)	Tomas Rodriguez	TKO	3 (?)	Feb 22, 1991	U.S. Virgin Islands	
44	Loss	30–10–2 (2)	Stanley Longstreet	KO	2 (10), 1:40	Aug 17, 1989	The Palace, Auburn Hills, Michigan, U.S.	
43	Loss	30–9–2 (2)	John John Molina	DQ	4 (?)	Jun 6, 1988	Sands Hotel & Casino, San Juan, Puerto Rico	
42	Loss	30–8–2 (2)	Raul Frank	TKO	5 (10)	Aug 2, 1987	Georgetown, Guyana	
41	Loss	30–7–2 (2)	Robert Byrd	KO	5 (?)	May 16, 1987	Hotel San Juan, Isla Verde, Puerto Rico	
40	Loss	30–6–2 (2)	Lester Ellis	TKO	8 (10), 0:49	Mar 27, 1986	Melrose Reception Centre, Melbourne, Australia	
39	Loss	30–5–2 (2)	Bobby Chacon	TKO	5 (10), 2:18	Oct 4, 1985	ARCO Arena, Sacramento, California, U.S.	
38	Win	30–4–2 (2)	Anthony Cunningham	KO	1 (?)	Jul 20, 1984	Carolina, Puerto Rico	
37	Loss	29–4–2 (2)	Héctor Camacho	KO	5 (12), 2:02	Nov 18, 1983	Coliseo Roberto Clemente, San Juan, Puerto Rico	For WBC super-featherweight title
36	Win	29–3–2 (2)	Benny Marquez	TKO	4 (?), 2:57	Aug 7, 1983	Hiram Bithorn Stadium, San Juan, Puerto Rico	
35	Win	28–3–2 (2)	Tony Styles	KO	2 (10), 1:22	May 27, 1983	Jai Alai Fronton, Miami, Florida, U.S.	
34	Win	27–3–2 (2)	Joey Mayes	TKO	2 (?)	Feb 20, 1983	Coliseo Roberto Clemente, San Juan, Puerto Rico	
33	Win	26–3–2 (2)	Aquilino Asprilla	KO	6 (12)	Oct 2, 1982	Convention Center, Miami Beach, Florida, U.S.	Won WBC FECARBOX super-featherweight title
32	Win	25–3–2 (2)	Sergio Aguirre	TKO	9 (10)	Aug 18, 1982	Hiram Bithorn Stadium, San Juan, Puerto Rico	
31	Win	24–3–2 (2)	Juan Manuel Manriquez	PTS	10	Mar 3, 1982	Santiago de Chile, Chile	
30	Win	23–3–2 (2)	Carlos Santana	KO	3 (8)	Dec 18, 1981	Auditorium, Miami Beach, Florida, U.S.	
29	Win	22–3–2 (2)	Chucu Zimmerman	TKO	3 (12)	Sep 26, 1981	Convention Center, Miami Beach, Florida, U.S.	
28	NC	21–3–2 (2)	Antonio Cruz	NC	6 (10)	Aug 7, 1981	Felt Forum, New York City, New York, U.S.	The bout was stopped by referee Harold Valan due to an unruly crowd throwing bottles, Cruz was hit in the knee by a bottle fragment
27	Win	21–3–2 (1)	Jorge Zuniga	TKO	2 (10)	Mar 28, 1981	Convention Center, Miami, Beach, Florida, U.S.	
26	Win	20–3–2 (1)	Enrique Maxwell	PTS	10	Dec 19, 1980	San Juan, Puerto Rico	
25	Wim	19–3–2 (1)	Jose Latimer	TKO	4 (?)	Oct 17, 1980	San Juan, Puerto Rico	
24	Win	18–3–2 (1)	Anthony House	KO	3 (10)	Aug 29, 1980	Convention Center, Miami Beach, Florida, U.S.	
23	Win	17–3–2 (1)	Jose Luis Alejandro	TKO	9 (?)	Jul 17, 1980	Río Piedras, Puerto Rico	
22	Draw	16–3–2 (1)	Leonidas Asprilla	PTS	10	Feb 23, 1980	Cartagena, Colombia	
21	Win	16–3–1 (1)	Felix Figueroa	TKO	9 (10)	Aug 25, 1979	Coliseo Roberto Clemente, San Juan, Puerto Rico	
20	Win	15–3–1 (1)	Adolfo Marte	KO	3 (?)	Feb 23, 1979	Santo Domingo, Dominican Republic	
19	Win	14–3–1 (1)	Delio Mercedes	TKO	7 (10)	Aug 14, 1978	Palacio de Deportes, Santo Domingo, Dominican Republic	
18	Win	13–3–1 (1)	Jose Roman	TKO	4 (?)	May 20, 1978	Country Club Stadium, Carolina, Puerto Rico	
17	Win	12–3–1 (1)	Gregorio Severino	KO	5 (?)	Apr 14, 1978	Santo Domingo, Dominican Republic	
16	Win	11–3–1 (1)	Frank Joe	PTS	8	Feb 18, 1978	Coliseo Roberto Clemente, San Juan, Puerto Rico	
15	NC	10–3–1 (1)	Ernesto Herrera	NC	9 (10)	Oct 29, 1977	Forum, Inglewood, California, U.S.	The bout was stopped after fans threw debris into the ring near the end of the 9th round
14	Win	10–3–1	Teodoro Osuna	PTS	10	Oct 14, 1977	Santo Domingo, Dominican Republic	
13	Win	9–3–1	Hector Montas	KO	6 (?)	Aug 8, 1977	Palacio de Deportes, Santo Domingo, Dominican Republic	
12	Loss	8–3–1	Claude Noel	PTS	10	Jun 3, 1977	Pointe-à-Pitre, Guadeloupe, France	
11	Loss	8–2–1	Idelfonso Bethelmy	KO	1 (?)	May 29, 1977	Caracas, Venezuela	
10	Win	8–1–1	Roberto Calixto	KO	2 (?)	Feb 22, 1977	Santo Domingo, Dominican Republic	
9	Win	7–1–1	Arnaldo Santiago	PTS	10	Nov 13, 1976	Guayama, Puerto Rico	
8	Win	6–1–1	Francisco Cruz	PTS	10	Aug 6, 1976	San Juan, Puerto Rico	
7	Win	5–1–1	Azor Agosto	PTS	6	Jun 4, 1976	Cancha Country Club, Caguas, Puerto Rico	
6	Win	4–1–1	Carlos Rodriguez	TKO	7 (8)	Apr 27, 1976	Coliseo Roberto Celemnte, San Juan, Puerto Rico	
5	Win	3–1–1	Hector Julio Rivera	PTS	6	Nov 17, 1975	San Juan, Puerto Rico	
4	Win	2–1–1	Arnaldo Santiago	PTS	4	Nov 1, 1975	San Juan, Puerto Rico	
3	Loss	1–1–1	Carlos Rodriguez	TKO	1 (?)	Sep 14, 1974	San Juan, Puerto Rico	
2	Draw	1–0–1	Luis Rosario	PTS	4	Aug 12, 1974	Coliseo Roberto Clemente, San Juan, Puerto Rico	
1	Win	1–0	Victor Arnau	PTS	4	Jul 31, 1974	San Juan, Puerto Rico	
