= Rick "Rocky" Lockridge =

American boxer (1959–2019)

Rick Lockridge
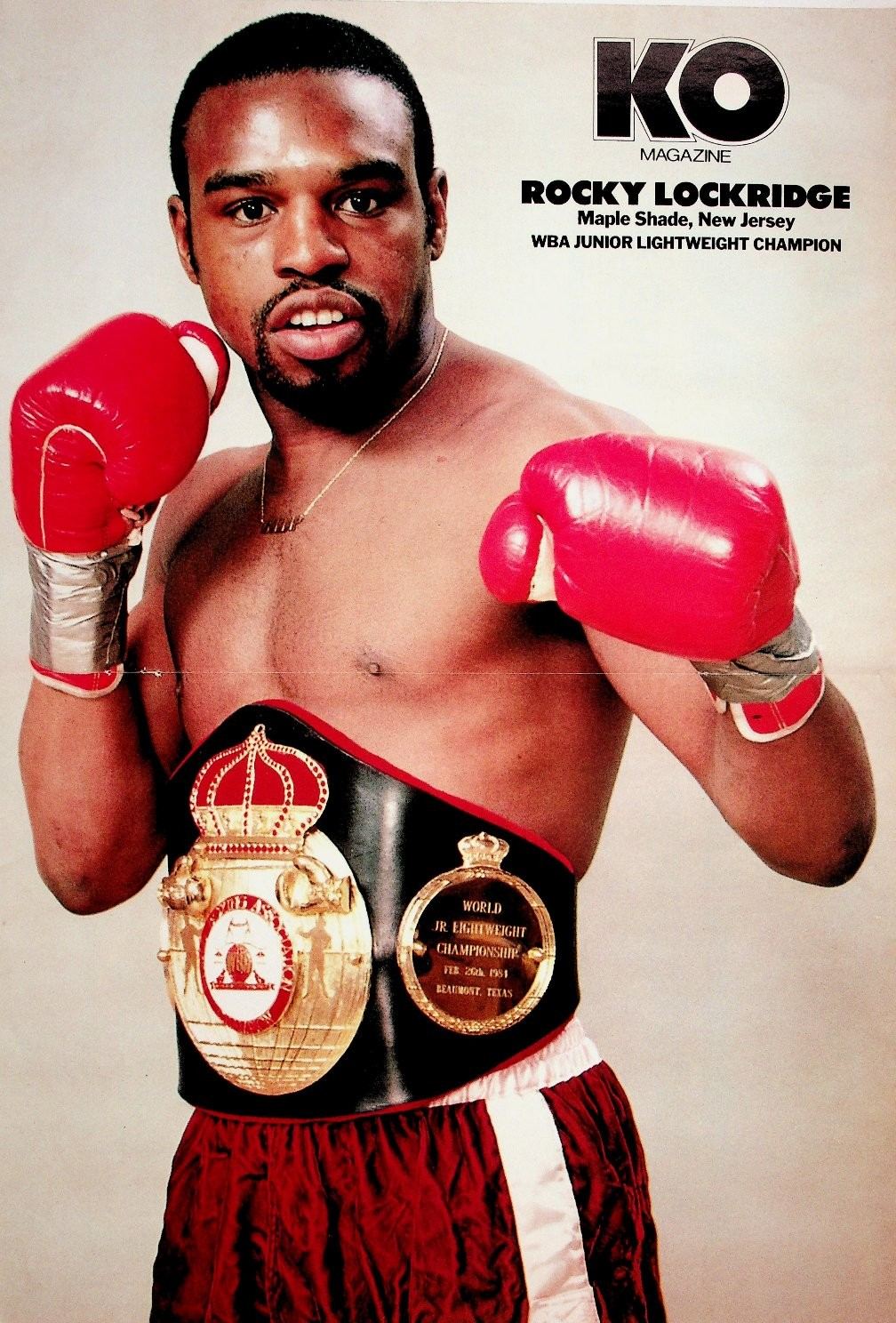
- Lockridge in 1984

Personal information
- Nickname: Rocky
- Born: Rick Lockridge; January 10, 1959 Tacoma, Washington, U.S.
- Died: February 7, 2019 (aged 60) Gloucester City, New Jersey, U.S.
- Height: 5 ft 6 1/2 in (169 cm)
- Weight: Super featherweight Featherweight

Boxing career
- Reach: 68 in (173 cm)
- Stance: Orthodox

Boxing record
- Total fights: 53
- Wins: 44
- Win by KO: 36
- Losses: 9

Rick "Rocky" Lockridge (January 10, 1959 – February 7, 2019) was an American professional boxer. He is perhaps best known for having handed Roger Mayweather his first defeat—a first-round knockout in just 98 seconds—earning him the WBA and lineal super featherweight titles. He later won the IBF super featherweight title. He is also known from his 2010 appearance on the A&E television series Intervention and a meme of him crying that was made from the show.

== Early life and career ==
Rocky Lockridge was born on January 10, 1959, in Tacoma, Washington. After relocating to Paterson, New Jersey, at 19 years old in 1978, he made his debut fight in the professional ring on August 9, defeating Tony Reed by TKO. On September 18, 1979, he defeated Gerald Hayes via unanimous decision to win the New Jersey State Featherweight Championship, and on February 19, 1980, he won by TKO against Fel Clemente to win the USA Featherweight Champion title.

On October 4, 1980, he fought for the WBA World Featherweight title against Eusebio Pedroza, losing by a majority decision; this defeat was Lockridge's first in the professional ring. On April 6, 1981, he retained the New Jersey featherweight title by defeating Ernesto Gonzalez by unanimous decision. On August 22, 1981, in a fight for the US featherweight title, he was knocked out by Juan Laporte. On April 24, 1983, he met Pedroza again in the fight for the WBA featherweight title, losing by unanimous decision.

On February 26, 1984, he knocked out the undefeated Roger Mayweather in round one and won the WBA junior-lightweight world championship. After defeating Mayweather, Lockridge and his wife Carolyn moved to Mount Laurel, New Jersey, where they gave birth to twin sons Ricky and Lamar on August 23, 1984. Lockridge made two successful title defenses: on June 12, 1984, he won by TKO in round eleven against Tae Jin Moon, and on January 27, 1985, he won by TKO in round six against Kamel Bou-Ali, a future WBO world junior-lightweight champion himself. However, on May 15 of the same year, he lost the title by majority decision to Wilfredo Gómez.

On August 3, 1986, he lost by majority decision in the fight for the WBC world junior-lightweight title to the undefeated Julio César Chávez. On August 9, 1987, Lockridge defeated Barry Michael after Michael refused to continue the fight after the 8th round and won the IBF world junior-lightweight championship. On October 25, 1987, he defeated Johnny de la Rosa and defended the title, and on April 2, 1988, by unanimous decision, he defeated Harold Knight and again defended his title. On July 23, 1988, he lost by unanimous decision to Tony Lopez and lost his title to the Mexican-American. On March 5, 1989, a rematch took place between Lopez and Lockridge, which ended in the same way as the first fight. After the second defeat to Lopez, Lockridge retired following a victory against Mike Zena in 1989.

== Later years and death ==
Lockridge returned with his family to Tacoma in 1991 – 18 months following his retirement from boxing – and he and Carolyn separated shortly thereafter due to financial stress and Rocky's addiction to alcohol and crack cocaine. 30 months after his original retirement, Lockridge attempted a comeback under new management in Washington, but both his fights in this period ended in losses.

In 1993, Lockridge moved to Camden, New Jersey, alone, and began working as a cleaner and painter for a drum and barrel company in January 1994. Shortly after, he was arrested for burglary and sentenced to five years probation. Three years later, he was arrested on a similar charge and served 27 months in prison before being released in July 1999. Lockridge spent the following years in homelessness, living on a monthly $140 and food stamps provided by the government, as well as pocket change from panhandling. Lockridge also lived in abandoned homes until he suffered a stroke in 2006, requiring him to use a cane.

Lockridge was eventually brought by his family onto the A&E television series Intervention in 2010. A scene from the episode, in which an emotional Lockridge loudly wails, became an internet meme titled "best cry ever". Following this appearance, Lockridge spent 90 days in a facility, and had remained sober since.

Lockridge suffered another stroke in 2012, then he died on February 7, 2019, at the age of 60, after being placed on home hospice care following multiple strokes. He was removed from life support about one week prior to his death. In the weeks preceding his death, he was hooked to a feeding tube due to an inability to swallow, and suffered from aspiration pneumonia. His caretaker had set up a GoFundMe to help cover his medical expenses.

== Professional boxing record ==
53 fights	44 wins	9 losses
By knockout	36	1
By decision	8	8

No.	Result	Record	Opponent	Type	Round	Date	Location	Notes
53	Loss	44–9	Sharmba Mitchell	UD	10	Apr 22, 1992	Meadowlands Arena, East Rutherford, New Jersey, U.S.	
52	Loss	44–8	Rafael Ruelas	UD	10	Jan 30, 1992	Country Club, Reseda, California, U.S.	
51	Win	44–7	Mike Zena	KO	8 (10)	Jun 18, 1989	Caesars Tahoe, Outdoor Arena, Stateline, Nevada, U.S.	
50	Loss	43–7	Tony Lopez	UD	12	Mar 5, 1989	Arco Arena, Sacramento, California, U.S.	For IBF super-featherweight title
49	Loss	43–6	Tony Lopez	UD	12	Jul 23, 1988	Arco Arena, Sacramento, California, U.S.	Lost IBF super-featherweight title
48	Win	43–5	Harold Knight	UD	15	Apr 2, 1988	Sands Casino Hotel, Atlantic City, New Jersey, U.S.	Retained IBF super-featherweight title
47	Win	42–5	Johnny De La Rosa	TKO	10 (15)	Oct 25, 1987	Community Center, Tucson, Arizona, U.S.	Retained IBF super-featherweight title
46	Win	41–5	Barry Michael	RTD	8 (15)	Aug 9, 1987	Blazers Night Club, Windsor, Berkshire, England, U.K.	Won IBF super-featherweight title
45	Win	40–5	Dennis Cruz	KO	7 (10)	May 24, 1987	Memorial Coliseum, Corpus Christi, Texas, U.S.	
44	Win	39–5	Felipe Orozco	UD	10	Oct 22, 1986	Harrah's Marina Hotel Casino, Atlantic City, New Jersey, U.S.	
43	Loss	38–5	Julio César Chávez	MD	12	Aug 3, 1986	Stade Louis II, Fontvieille, Monaco	For WBC super-featherweight title
42	Win	38–4	Efrain Nieves	TKO	3 (10)	Mar 12, 1986	Harrah's Marina Hotel Casino, Atlantic City, New Jersey, U.S.	
41	Win	37–4	Fernando Segura	TKO	4 (10)	Dec 18, 1985	Harrah's Marina Hotel Casino, Atlantic City, New Jersey, U.S.	
40	Loss	36–4	Wilfredo Gómez	MD	15	May 19, 1985	Coliseo Roberto Clemente, San Juan, Puerto Rico	Lost WBA and The Ring super-featherweight titles
39	Win	36–3	Kamel Bou Ali	TKO	6 (15)	Jan 27, 1985	Palazzo del Congress, Riva del Garda, Trentino-Alto Adige, Italy	Retained WBA and The Ring super-featherweight titles
38	Win	35–3	Julio Llerena	KO	6 (10)	Jul 29, 1984	Castello Sforzesco, Milan, Lombardia, Italy	
37	Win	34–3	Tae Jin Moon	TKO	11 (15)	Jun 12, 1984	Sullivan Arena, Anchorage, Alaska, U.S.	Retained WBA and The Ring super-featherweight titles
36	Win	33–3	Roger Mayweather	KO	1 (15)	Feb 26, 1984	Civic Center, Beaumont, Texas, U.S.	Won WBA and The Ring super-featherweight titles
35	Win	32–3	Jeff Goodwin	TKO	3 (10)	Nov 23, 1983	Sands Casino Hotel, Atlantic City, New Jersey, U.S.	
34	Win	31–3	Cornelius Boza-Edwards	UD	10	Sep 9, 1983	Caesars Palace, Outdoor Arena, Las Vegas, Nevada, U.S.	
33	Win	30–3	Danny Cruz	TKO	1 (10)	Jul 14, 1983	Ice World, Totowa, New Jersey, U.S.	
32	Loss	29–3	Eusebio Pedroza	UD	15	Apr 24, 1983	San Remo, Liguria, Italy	For WBA and The Ring featherweight title
31	Win	29–2	Alberto Collazo	TKO	9 (10)	Nov 24, 1982	Resorts International, Atlantic City, New Jersey, U.S.	
30	Win	28–2	Angel Lira	TKO	6 (10)	Sep 25, 1982	Great Gorge Resort, McAfee, New Jersey, U.S.	
29	Win	27–2	Miguel Angel Hernandez	TKO	3 (10)	Aug 22, 1982	Great Gorge Resort, McAfee, New Jersey, U.S.	
28	Win	26–2	Daniel Felizardo	KO	2 (10)	Jun 24, 1982	Resorts International, Atlantic City, New Jersey, U.S.	
27	Win	25–2	Jose Nieto	TKO	8 (10)	May 23, 1982	Tropicana Hotel & Casino, Atlantic City, New Jersey, U.S.	
26	Win	24–2	Robert Mullins	TKO	5 (10)	Apr 10, 1982	Sands Casino Hotel, Atlantic City, New Jersey, U.S.	
25	Win	23–2	Jose Resendez	TKO	5 (10)	Mar 14, 1982	Tropicana Hotel & Casino, Atlantic City, New Jersey, U.S.	
24	Win	22–2	Tony Tris	UD	10	Dec 10, 1981	Ice World, Totowa, New Jersey, U.S.	
23	Win	21–2	Refugio Rojas	MD	10	Nov 12, 1981	Meadowlands Arena, East Rutherford, New Jersey, U.S.	
22	Loss	20–2	Juan Laporte	KO	2 (12)	Aug 22, 1981	Showboat Hotel & Casino, Sports Pavilion, Las Vegas, Nevada, U.S.	Lost USA New Jersey State featherweight title
21	Win	20–1	Sergio Reyes	TKO	3 (10)	May 21, 1981	Ice World, Totowa, New Jersey, U.S.	
20	Win	19–1	Ernesto Gonzalez	UD	12	Apr 6, 1981	Caesars Boardwalk Regency, Atlantic City, New Jersey, U.S.	Retained USA New Jersey State featherweight title
19	Win	18–1	Ernesto Gonzalez	KO	1 (10)	Jan 22, 1981	Ice World, Totowa, New Jersey, U.S.	
18	Win	17–1	Benny Marquez	TKO	3 (10)	Dec 18, 1980	Ice World, Totowa, New Jersey, U.S.	
17	Loss	16–1	Eusebio Pedroza	SD	15	Oct 4, 1980	Great Gorge Playboy Club, McAfee, New Jersey, U.S.	For WBA featherweight title
16	Win	16–0	Livio Nolasco	TKO	4 (10)	Aug 21, 1980	Ice World, Totowa, New Jersey, U.S.	
15	Win	15–0	Alfonso Evans	TKO	5 (10)	Jul 13, 1980	Great Gorge Playboy Club, McAfee, New Jersey, U.S.	
14	Win	14–0	Marcial Santiago	TKO	3 (8)	Jun 19, 1980	Ice World, Totowa, New Jersey, U.S.	
13	Win	13–0	Joey Mayes	TKO	2 (10)	Apr 1, 1980	Ice World, Totowa, New Jersey, U.S.	
12	Win	12–0	Richard Rozelle	KO	2 (10)	Mar 8, 1980	Great Gorge Playboy Club, McAfee, New Jersey, U.S.	
11	Win	11–0	Fel Clemente	TKO	7 (12)	Feb 19, 1980	Ice World, Totowa, New Jersey, U.S.	Won vacant USBA featherweight title
10	Win	10–0	Sammy Goss	TKO	5 (12)	Jan 8, 1980	Ice World, Totowa, New Jersey, U.S.	
9	Win	9–0	José Ortiz	KO	2 (10)	Oct 30, 1979	Ice World, Totowa, New Jersey, U.S.	
8	Win	8–0	Gerald Hayes	UD	12	Sep 18, 1979	Giant's Stadium, East Rutherford, New Jersey, U.S.	Won USA New Jersey State featherweight title
7	Win	7–0	Ronnie Green	KO	1 (6)	May 31, 1979	Convention Hall, Philadelphia, Pennsylvania, U.S.	
6	Win	6–0	Francisco Maldonado	KO	2 (6)	Apr 27, 1979	Robert Treat Hotel, Newark, New Jersey, U.S.	
5	Win	5–0	Melvin Boynton	KO	2 (6)	Apr 17, 1979	Ice World, Totowa, New Jersey, U.S.	
4	Win	4–0	Melvin Bethea	KO	1 (6)	Mar 13, 1979	Ice World, Totowa, New Jersey, U.S.	
3	Win	3–0	Tony Hernandez	TKO	1 (6)	Nov 14, 1978	Ice World, Totowa, New Jersey, U.S.	
2	Win	2–0	Jose Luis Lara	UD	6	Oct 5, 1978	Seattle Center Arena, Seattle, Washington, U.S.	
1	Win	1–0	Tony Reed	TKO	2 (4)	Aug 9, 1978	Seattle Center Arena, Seattle, Washington, U.S.	

== See also ==
- List of super featherweight boxing champions
- List of WBA world champions
- List of IBF world champions

Achievements
Preceded by Roger Mayweather	WBA super featherweight champion 26 Feb 1984– 19 May 1985	Succeeded by Wilfredo Gómez
Preceded by Barry Michael	IBF super featherweight champion 9 Aug 1987– 23 Jul 1988	Succeeded by Tony Lopez
