= Samuel Goss =

American boxer

Personal information
- Nationality: American
- Born: January 28, 1947 (age 79) Trenton, New Jersey, United States

Sport
- Sport: Boxing

Samuel Goss (born January 28, 1947) is an American boxer. He competed in the men's bantamweight event at the 1968 Summer Olympics.

In 2018, Goss received a payout of $25,000 from the city of Trenton to settle a lawsuit related to his injuries that resulted when the car in which he was a passenger was struck in a chain-reaction collision that was caused by a high-speed police chase.
