= Martin Nielsen (boxer) =

Danish boxer (born 1981)

Martin B. Nielsen (born 18 November 1981) is a Danish Cruiserweight professional boxer who made his debut on 14 June 2002. He won the IBF Youth Heavyweight Champion title on 12 November 2004 and IBF Youth Super Middleweight Champion title on 13 March 2004.
