= Bernard Taylor (boxer) =

American boxer (born 1957)

Personal information
- Nickname: The B.T. Express
- Born: June 26, 1957 (age 69) Charlotte, North Carolina, U.S.
- Height: 5 ft 6 in (168 cm)
- Weight: Featherweight; Super featherweight

Boxing career
- Reach: 69 in (175 cm)
- Stance: Orthodox

Boxing record
- Total fights: 51
- Wins: 45
- Win by KO: 22
- Losses: 4
- Draws: 2
- No contests: 0
Medal record
Representing United States
Men's Boxing
Pan American Games
Gold medal – first place	1979 San Juan	Featherweight
Silver medal – second place	1975 Mexico City	Bantamweight

Bernard Taylor (born June 26, 1957) is an American former professional boxer. As an amateur, he won a gold medal at the 1979 Pan American Games and a silver at the 1975 Pan American Games.

== Amateur career ==
Taylor had an incredible career as an amateur boxer, compiling a record of 481–8. Taylor qualified for the 1980 U.S. Olympic team but was unable to compete due to the 1980 Summer Olympics boycott. In 2007, he received one of 461 Congressional Gold Medals created especially for the spurned athletes.

=== Amateur Highlights ===
- 1972 National Junior Olympics Light Flyweight champion
- 1976 Duel Soviet Union vs USA-Moscow January 24
- 1976 National AAU Bantamweight champion
- 1976 National Golden Gloves Bantamweight champion
- 1977 National Golden Gloves Featherweight champion
- 1978 National Golden Gloves Featherweight champion
- 1979 National AAU Featherweight champion
- 1980 National Golden Gloves Featherweight champion.

== Professional career ==
Taylor turned pro in 1980 and was undefeated in 18 fights when he was given a shot at Panama's Eusebio Pedroza for the W.B.A. featherweight championship of the world. The fight took place in Taylor's hometown of Charlotte, North Carolina in October 1982. After building a lead in the first ten rounds of the fight, Taylor faded down the stretch and had to settle for a draw. Three years later, Taylor was still undefeated in 34 fights (33-0-1) when he was given another shot at the WBA featherweight championship. This time, the champion was Ireland's Barry McGuigan, who had dethroned Pedroza 3 months earlier. Taylor failed to come out for the 9th round, and lost via TKO. After several years and a couple of lengthy layoffs, Taylor earned a 3rd opportunity at a world championship against IBF junior lightweight champion John John Molina in 1993. Taylor again came up short via TKO in the 8th round. He retired following a loss in his next bout in 1994. Taylor did manage to win the NABF featherweight and the USBA junior lightweight titles, coming from behind to stop Calvin Grove in the latter fight.

Achievements
Preceded by Calvin Grove	USBA Super Featherweight Champion; February 8, 1990 - February 20, 1994	Succeeded by Pete Taliaferro
