= Clotilde (disambiguation) =

Clotilde (c. 474–545) was a saint and the wife of the Frankish leader Clovis I.

Clotild, Clotilda, Clotilde, Chlotilde, or Chrotilde may also refer to:

== People ==
- Clotilde (died 531), daughter of Clovis, wife of King Amalaric
- Clotilde (floruit 673), founder of a monastery at Bruyères-le-Châtel
- Clotilde (died 692), wife of King Theuderic III
- Clotilde de Surville (15th century), French writer and poet
- Clotilde of France (1759–1802), sister of King Louis XVI of France and wife of King Charles Emmanuel IV of Sardinia
- Princess Clotilde of Saxe-Coburg and Gotha, (1846–1927), Austrian archduchess
- Clotilde Arias (1901–1959), Peruvian composer
- Clotilde Cerdà (1861–1926), Spanish harpist
- Clotilde Dissard (1873-1919), French journalist, feminist
- Clotilde García Borrero (1887–1969), Colombian suffragist, writer
- Clotilde González de Fernández (1880-1935), Argentine educator, writer
- Clotilde Tambroni (1758–1817), Italian philologist and linguist
- Clotilde Théry, French molecular biologist
- Clotilde Rullaud, French musician and filmmaker

== Arts and entertainment ==
- "Clotilde", an episode of Bel Ami
- Doña Clotilde, a character of El Chavo del Ocho portrayed by actress Angelines Fernández

== Other uses ==
- Clothilde (musician), French singer active in the late 1960s
- Clotilde (opera), an 1815 opera by Carlo Coccia, libretto by Gaetano Rossi
- Clotilda (slave ship), the last ship to carry slaves from Africa to the United States
- La Clotilde, Chaco, Argentina
- Tropical Storm Clotilda, a 1987 tropical cyclone in Réunion

== See also ==
- Sainte-Clotilde (disambiguation)
- Chrothildis (7th century), Frankish queen consort to king Theuderic III
