= Richie Sandoval =

American boxer (1960–2024)

Personal information
- Nationality: American
- Born: Richard Sandoval; October 18, 1960 Pomona, California, U.S.
- Died: July 21, 2024 (aged 63)
- Height: 5 ft 5 1/2 in (166 cm)
- Weight: Bantamweight

Boxing career
- Reach: 66 1/2 in (169 cm)
- Stance: Orthodox

Boxing record
- Total fights: 30
- Wins: 29
- Win by KO: 17
- Losses: 1
Medal record
Men's Boxing
Representing United States
World Amateur Championships
Bronze medal – third place	1978 Belgrade	Light Flyweight
Pan American Games
Silver medal – second place	1979 San Juan	Light Flyweight

Richard Sandoval (October 18, 1960 – July 21, 2024) was an American professional boxer and Lineal and WBA Bantamweight Champion. Sandoval was a silver medalist at the 1979 Pan American Games in Puerto Rico and was a U.S. Olympian during his amateur career. He was also the younger brother of title contender Alberto Sandoval.

== Early life ==
Sandoval who was of Mexican descent was born in Pomona, California, a city famous in pugilistic circles as a hotbed for young boxing prospects, including Shane Mosley.

Sandoval's brother Alberto Sandoval was a popular bantamweight of the 1970s, who unsuccessfully challenged Carlos Zarate and Lupe Pintor for the world title.

The young Sandoval met another future world champion, Alberto Davila, at Pomona boxing gyms. Eventually, they became friends, and they shared the burden of boxing's dangers later on in life.

== Amateur career ==
Sandoval was a two-time National Golden Gloves Champion and from 1979 to 1980, Sandoval went on to win the National AAU Championship at Light Flyweight and then in the Flyweight division. Sandoval qualified for the 1980 U.S. Olympic team but was unable to compete due to the 1980 Summer Olympics boycott. In 2007, he received one of 461 Congressional Gold Medals created especially for the spurned athletes.

== Professional career ==
Richie Sandoval made his professional boxing debut on 5 November 1980, beating Gerardo Pedroza in Las Vegas, Nevada by a knockout in two rounds. He won his first ten fights by knockout, including two over fringe contender Javier Barajas. For his eleventh fight, Sandoval met Harold Petty, a boxer who was still fighting professionally at the age of 42 and who challenged twice for world titles. On 28 January 1982, he outpointed the undefeated Petty over ten rounds, going on to seven more wins that year, including another ten-round points victory over Petty.

Sandoval had five wins in 1983, the year in which his friend Davila won the WBC Bantamweight title by knocking out Kiko Bejines, who died days later. This introduced Sandoval to the darker side of boxing as he saw how hard it was for Davila to recover.

=== WBA Bantamweight Championship ===
Sandoval's next fight was held on 7 April 1984. Despite his record of 22 victories without any losses, including fifteen knockouts, he was a virtual unknown to most boxing fans when he met the Lineal and WBA Bantamweight champion Jeff Chandler in Atlantic City. After dropping the champion in round eleven, Sandoval won by TKO in round fifteen to become a world champion in a major upset. He followed this up with his first trip abroad as a professional boxer, to Monte Carlo on September 22. He outpointed the top ranked and well known Edgar Román over fifteen rounds on the undercard of Donald Curry's sixth-round knockout win over Nino LaRocca. He fought again on 15 December against Cardenio Ulloa, who was attempting to become the first Chilean world boxing champion in history. According to the report made by Ring En Español, Ulloa caused Chilean dictator Augusto Pinochet to jump off his chair with excitement when he dropped Sandoval in the third round, but Sandoval recovered and retained the title with an eighth-round knockout.

By then, however, Sandoval was facing weight problems and he could barely make the weight even for fights in the Featherweight division, two divisions above Bantamweight, and he was forced to fight all his fights in 1985 as a Featherweight instead. He scored three ten-round decisions that year and one in 1986, including wins over Frankie Duarte and Diego Avila.

==== Last bout and title defence ====
After not defending his title for a year and a half, he was forced by the WBA to defend his title or be stripped of it. He chose to defend it, despite his problems making the weight. On 3 March 1986, Sandoval defended his title against Gaby Canizales, as part of a super-undercard organized by promoter Bob Arum, which included the Hearns versus Shuler and Hagler versus Mugabi encounters. Sandoval reportedly had to lose around twelve pounds in three days in order to be able to fight that night, staying off any solid foods and surviving only on water. Weakened and feeling the side-effects of such a sudden drop-off in weight, Sandoval suffered four knockdowns, but he fought on until the fifth knockdown, which happened in round seven, after which the referee stopped the fight. He fell unconscious a few minutes after the fight, stopping breathing for an estimated three minutes. He was rushed to hospital by local on-site paramedics, but he remained in critical condition for the next few nights. He had life-saving brain surgery, but the inevitable consequence was that Sandoval was obliged to retire. His final record was 29 wins and one loss, 17 wins by knockout.

== Professional boxing record ==
30 fights	29 wins	1 loss
By knockout	17	1
By decision	12	0

No.	Result	Record	Opponent	Type	Round, time	Date	Location	Notes
30	Loss	29–1	Gaby Canizales	TKO	7 (15)	Mar 10, 1986	Caesars Palace Outdoor Arena, Paradise, Nevada, U.S.	Lost WBA & The Ring bantamweight titles
29	Win	29–0	Hector Cortez	UD	10 (10)	1986-02-07	Cal Poly Pomona Gym, Pomona, California, U.S.	
28	Win	28–0	Diego Avila	UD	10 (10)	1985-11-10	Cal Poly Pomona Gym, Pomona, California, U.S.	
27	Win	27–0	Jose Gallegos	UD	10 (10)	1985-08-24	Pride Pavilion, Phoenix, Arizona, U.S.	
26	Win	26–0	Frankie Duarte	SD	10 (10)	1985-04-09	Memorial Auditorium, Sacramento, California, U.S.	
25	Win	25–0	Cardenio Ulloa	TKO	8 (15)	1984-12-15	Convention Center, Miami Beach, Florida, U.S.	Retained WBA & The Ring bantamweight titles
24	Win	24–0	Edgar Roman	UD	15 (15)	1984-09-22	Chapiteau de l'Espace Fontvieille, Fontvieille, Monaco	Retained WBA & The Ring bantamweight titles
23	Win	23–0	Jeff Chandler	TKO	15 (15)	1984-04-07	Sands Casino Hotel, Atlantic City, New Jersey, U.S.	Won WBA & The Ring bantamweight titles
22	Win	22–0	Ramon Rico	UD	10 (10)	1983-08-25	Sports Arena, Los Angeles, California, U.S.	
21	Win	21–0	George Garcia	SD	10 (10)	1983-05-19	Sports Arena, Los Angeles, California, U.S.	
20	Win	20–0	David Bejines	TKO	6 (10)	1983-03-24	Olympic Auditorium, Los Angeles, California, U.S.	
19	Win	19–0	Jose Coronado	TKO	6 (?)	1983-03-03	Olympic Auditorium, Los Angeles, California, U.S.	
18	Win	18–0	Alonzo Gonzalez	UD	10 (10)	1982-11-27	Bally's Park Place, Atlantic City, New Jersey, U.S.	
17	Win	17–0	Jose Luis Garcia	TKO	2 (10)	1982-09-09	Olympic Auditorium, Los Angeles, California, U.S.	
16	Win	16–0	Julio Rodriguez	UD	10 (10)	1982-08-19	Showboat Hotel and Casino, Las Vegas, Nevada, U.S.	
15	Win	15–0	Ian Clyde	SD	10 (10)	1982-07-01	Showboat Hotel and Casino, Las Vegas, Nevada, U.S.	
14	Win	14–0	Miguel Flores	KO	2 (10)	1982-05-06	Olympic Auditorium, Los Angeles, California, U.S.	
13	Win	13–0	Harold Petty	MD	10 (10)	1982-04-03	Aladdin, Paradise, Nevada, U.S.	
12	Win	12–0	Ron Cisneros	TKO	4 (10)	1982-02-25	Showboat Hotel and Casino, Las Vegas, Nevada, U.S.	
11	Win	11–0	Harold Petty	SD	10 (10)	1982-01-28	Showboat Hotel and Casino, Las Vegas, Nevada, U.S.	
10	Win	10–0	Jose Torres	TKO	1 (10)	1981-11-26	Hacienda Hotel, Paradise, Nevada, U.S.	
9	Win	9–0	Javier Barajas	TKO	3 (10)	1981-10-22	Hacienda Hotel, Paradise, Nevada, U.S.	
8	Win	8–0	Marcello Camacho	KO	1 (8)	1981-07-23	Hacienda Hotel, Paradise, Nevada, U.S.	
7	Win	7–0	Javier Barajas	KO	4 (?)	1981-06-26	Hacienda Hotel, Paradise, Nevada, U.S.	
6	Win	6–0	Lorenzo Ramirez	TKO	3 (8)	1981-05-28	Hacienda Hotel, Paradise, Nevada, U.S.	
5	Win	5–0	Frankie Granados	TKO	2 (6)	1981-03-26	Hacienda Hotel, Paradise, Nevada, U.S.	
4	Win	4–0	Luis Ruiz	TKO	2 (6)	1981-02-26	Hacienda Hotel, Paradise, Nevada, U.S.	
3	Win	3–0	Jose Castro	KO	1 (?)	1981-01-29	Caesars Palace Sports Pavilion, Paradise, Nevada, U.S.	
2	Win	2–0	Miguel Juarez	KO	1 (6)	1980-12-26	Caesars Palace Sports Pavilion, Paradise, Nevada, U.S.	
1	Win	1–0	Gerardo Pedroza	KO	2 (4)	1980-11-05	Silver Slipper, Paradise, Nevada, U.S.	

== Retirement and death ==
Sandoval later went touring across the United States with Davila, as each had been through both sides of a tragic boxing bout. They went on television talk-shows and public appearances to explain to the general public how a boxer feels (in Davila's case) after an opponent has died, and how a boxer can be so close to death in an instant after a fight (in Sandoval's case), and then having to deal with the fact that he or she will never be able to box again. Sandoval and Davila remained friends.

Sandoval died on July 21, 2024, at the age of 63.

== See also ==
- Lineal championship
- List of boxing families
- List of Mexican boxing world champions
- List of world bantamweight boxing champions

Sporting positions
Amateur boxing titles
Previous: Not contested	Golden Gloves light flyweight champion 1978–1979	Next: Steve McCrory
Previous: James Cullins	U.S. light flyweight champion 1979	Next: Robert Shannon
Previous: Harold Petty	U.S. flyweight champion 1980	Next: Fred Perkins
World boxing titles
Preceded by Jeff Chandler	WBA bantamweight champion April 7, 1984 – March 10, 1986	Succeeded by Gaby Canizales
Preceded by Jeff Chandler	The Ring bantamweight champion April 7, 1984 – March 10, 1986	Succeeded by Gaby Canizales
