= O'Higgins Department =

- Department
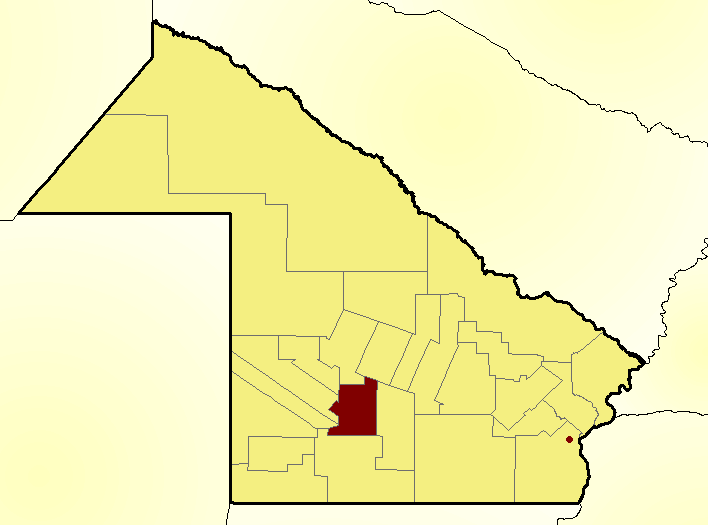
- Location of O'Higgins Department within Chaco Province
- Coordinates: 27°17′S 60°42′W
- Country: Argentina
- Province: Chaco Province
- Head town: San Bernardo

Population
  - Total: 19,231
- Time zone: UTC-3 (ART)
- Postal code: H3701
- Area code: 03735

O'Higgins is a department of Chaco Province in Argentina.

The provincial subdivision has a population of about 19,000 inhabitants in an area of 1,580 km², and its capital city is San Bernardo, which is located around 190 km from the provincial capital.

== Settlements ==
- La Clotilde
- La Tigra
- San Bernardo (capital)
