= Barbe de Verrue =

According to the pseudo-historical Poésies de Clotilde, Barbe de Verrue was a French trouvère in the 13th century. She was said to be an adopted child, and a successful singer who traveled and performed her own songs. She performed songs about Griseldis, a poem titled Gallic Orpheus about the Gauls, and another titled Aucassin and Nicolette. Her work was described as "lively" and "gay", and not necessarily romantic. She is one of the 999 famous women included in the Heritage Floor of Judy Chicago's The Dinner Party.
