= Fontenay-lès-Briis =

Commune in Île-de-France, France

- Commune
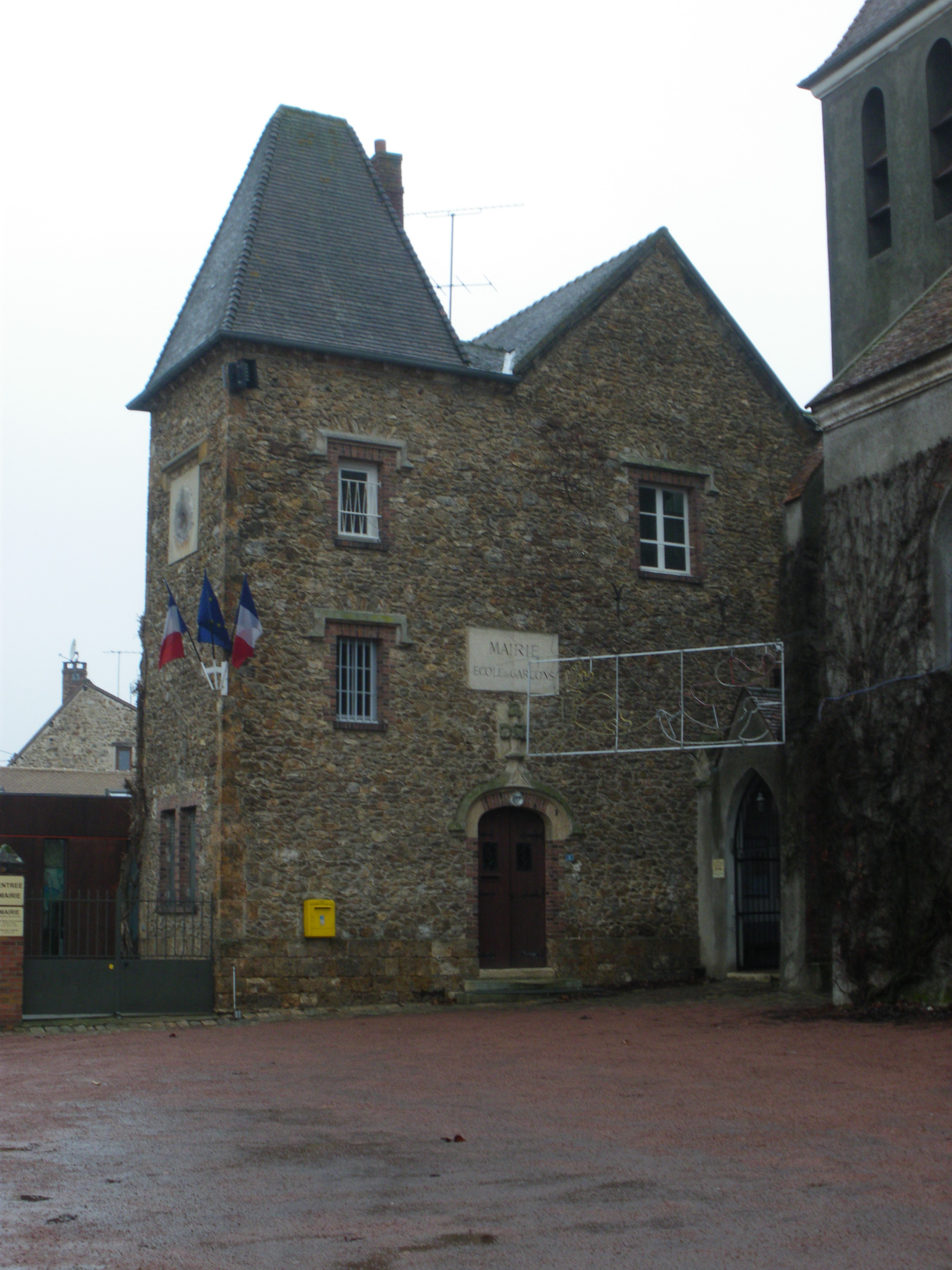
- The town hall of Fontenay
- Location of Fontenay-lès-Briis
- Location within France Location within Île-de-France (region)
- Coordinates: 48°37′09″N 2°09′22″E
- Country: France
- Region: Île-de-France
- Department: Essonne
- Arrondissement: Palaiseau
- Canton: Dourdan
- Intercommunality: Pays de Limours

Government
  - Mayor (2020–2026): Thierry Degivry
- Area^{1}: 9.72 km^{2} (3.75 sq mi)
- Highest elevation: 170 m (560 ft)
- Lowest elevation: 59 m (194 ft)
- Population (2023): 2,350
  - Density: 242/km^{2} (626/sq mi)
- Time zone: UTC+01:00 (CET)
  - Summer (DST): UTC+02:00 (CEST)
- INSEE/Postal code: 91243 /91640
- ^{1} French Land Register data, which excludes lakes, ponds, glaciers > 1 km^{2} (0.386 sq mi or 247 acres) and river estuaries.

Fontenay-lès-Briis (French pronunciation: [fɔ̃tnɛ lɛ bʁi], literally Fontenay near Briis) is a commune in the Essonne department in Île-de-France in northern France.

== History ==
The village of Fontenay-lès-Briis is mentioned in the charter of Clotilde, dated to 10 March 673, founding a nunnery at Bruyères-le-Châtel.

== Geography ==
=== Climate ===
Fontenay-lès-Briis has an oceanic climate (Köppen climate classification Cfb). The average annual temperature in Fontenay-lès-Briis is 11.6 °C (52.9 °F). The average annual rainfall is 696.0 mm (27.40 in) with December as the wettest month. The temperatures are highest on average in July, at around 19.8 °C (67.6 °F), and lowest in January, at around 4.4 °C (39.9 °F). The highest temperature ever recorded in Fontenay-lès-Briis was 42.5 °C (108.5 °F) on 25 July 2019; the coldest temperature ever recorded was −18.0 °C (−0.4 °F) on 17 January 1985.

Climate data for Fontenay-lès-Briis (1991−2020 normals, extremes 1964−2021)
Month	Jan	Feb	Mar	Apr	May	Jun	Jul	Aug	Sep	Oct	Nov	Dec	Year
Record high °C (°F)	16.5 (61.7)	20.7 (69.3)	24.9 (76.8)	29.2 (84.6)	32.5 (90.5)	37.5 (99.5)	42.5 (108.5)	40.2 (104.4)	34.8 (94.6)	30.0 (86.0)	21.5 (70.7)	17.3 (63.1)	42.5 (108.5)
Mean daily maximum °C (°F)	7.3 (45.1)	8.5 (47.3)	12.6 (54.7)	16.3 (61.3)	20.1 (68.2)	23.5 (74.3)	26.1 (79.0)	26.0 (78.8)	21.8 (71.2)	16.6 (61.9)	10.9 (51.6)	7.6 (45.7)	16.4 (61.5)
Daily mean °C (°F)	4.4 (39.9)	4.9 (40.8)	7.9 (46.2)	10.7 (51.3)	14.3 (57.7)	17.5 (63.5)	19.8 (67.6)	19.6 (67.3)	16.0 (60.8)	12.1 (53.8)	7.6 (45.7)	4.8 (40.6)	11.6 (52.9)
Mean daily minimum °C (°F)	1.5 (34.7)	1.2 (34.2)	3.1 (37.6)	5.0 (41.0)	8.6 (47.5)	11.6 (52.9)	13.4 (56.1)	13.2 (55.8)	10.2 (50.4)	7.7 (45.9)	4.4 (39.9)	2.1 (35.8)	6.8 (44.2)
Record low °C (°F)	−18.0 (−0.4)	−13.5 (7.7)	−10.8 (12.6)	−6.0 (21.2)	−1.5 (29.3)	1.1 (34.0)	4.3 (39.7)	3.7 (38.7)	0.5 (32.9)	−4.1 (24.6)	−10.4 (13.3)	−16.5 (2.3)	−18.0 (−0.4)
Average precipitation mm (inches)	54.2 (2.13)	48.6 (1.91)	50.4 (1.98)	47.5 (1.87)	69.0 (2.72)	58.0 (2.28)	61.1 (2.41)	62.6 (2.46)	50.9 (2.00)	61.2 (2.41)	61.2 (2.41)	71.3 (2.81)	696.0 (27.40)
Average precipitation days (≥ 1.0 mm)	11.2	10.4	9.7	9.0	9.4	8.6	7.5	7.8	7.6	10.1	11.6	12.6	115.5
Source: Météo-France

== Population ==
Historical population
Year	Pop.	±% p.a.
1968	929	—
1975	1,168	+3.32%
1982	1,204	+0.43%
1990	1,567	+3.35%
1999	1,707	+0.96%
2007	1,713	+0.04%
2012	1,882	+1.90%
2017	2,149	+2.69%
2023	2,350	+1.50%
Source: INSEE

Inhabitants of Fontenay-lès-Briis are known as Fontenois in French.

== See also ==
- Communes of the Essonne department
