= La Tigra, Chaco =

La Tigra
- Municipality and village
- Location within Chaco Province Location within Argentina
- Coordinates: 27°6′36″S 60°35′14″W
- Country: Argentina
- Province: Chaco
- Department: O'Higgins
- Elevation: 285 ft (87 m)

Population (2010)
  - Total: 2,866
- Time zone: UTC−3 (ART)

La Tigra is a village and municipality located in the O'Higgins Department in Chaco Province in northern Argentina.

== Notable people ==
- Sergio Víctor Palma (1956–2021), professional boxer, WBA Super Bantamweight champion
