= Sainte-Clotilde (disambiguation) =

Sainte-Clotilde (French for Saint Clotilde) may refer to:

- Sainte-Clotilde, Paris, a basilica church
- Sainte-Clotilde, Quebec, Canada
- Sainte-Clotilde-de-Beauce, Quebec, Canada
- Sainte-Clotilde-de-Horton, Quebec, Canada
- Sainte-Clotilde, a neighborhood in Saint-Denis, Réunion

== See also ==
- Santa Clotilde, a village on São Tomé Island, São Tomé and Príncipe
- Clotilde (disambiguation)
