= Gerald Hayes (boxer) =

American boxer (1952 – c. 2016)

Gerald Hayes (1952-died before November, 2016) was an American professional journeyman boxer in the Bantamweight, Featherweight and Junior Lightweight divisions. Having fought 50 fights, he faced eight world champions and 4 International Boxing Hall of Fame member boxers during his career. These were Lupe Pintor, Bobby Chacon, Rocky Lockridge, Alexis Arguello, Freddie Pendleton, Marcos Villasana, Juan Laporte, and Eusebio Pedroza. Pintor, Chacon, Arguello and Pedroza are all members of the International Boxing Hall of Fame.

Hayes beat Pendleton and Laporte, who was, at the time, the World Boxing Council world Featherweight champion, by ten-rounds decisions in non-title fights, and dropped Pedroza, the World Boxing Association world featherweight champion at the time of their contest too, in round three before being stopped in the tenth by the Panamanian at the Centro de Convenciones Atlapa on Panama City, Panama, on June 23, 1984, in another non-title match.

Hayes also fought several contenders and boxers who fought unsuccessfully for world titles, including Derrik Holmes, Bashew Sibaca in South Africa, Jorge Alvarado, James Martinez, Bernard Taylor twice, James Busceme, Carmelo Negron and Richard Savage. He held wins over Sibaca and Negron.

== Barry McGuigan ==
Prior to Irishman Barry McGuigan's successful challenge of Pedroza for the WBA's world featherweight title in 1985, Hayes traveled to McGuigan's training center to help him prepare for that contest. Barney Eastwood, McGuigan's promoter, said that Hayes was "a smart cookie" who "showed (McGuigan) (Pedroza's) tricks and said a right hand could beat (Pedroza)".

== Professional boxing record ==
In 50 fights, Hayes had 24 wins, 22 losses and 4 draws (ties), with 11 wins and 2 of those losses being by knockout.

== Hall of Fame ==
On November 3, 2016, Hayes was posthumously inducted into the New Jersey Boxing Hall of Fame.

== Personal life ==
Hayes was married to Yvette Hayes, the pair had two children.

== See also ==
- Angel Robinson Garcia - another journeyman boxer who fought several Hall of Fame members
