= Sergio Víctor Palma =

Argentinian boxer (1956–2021)

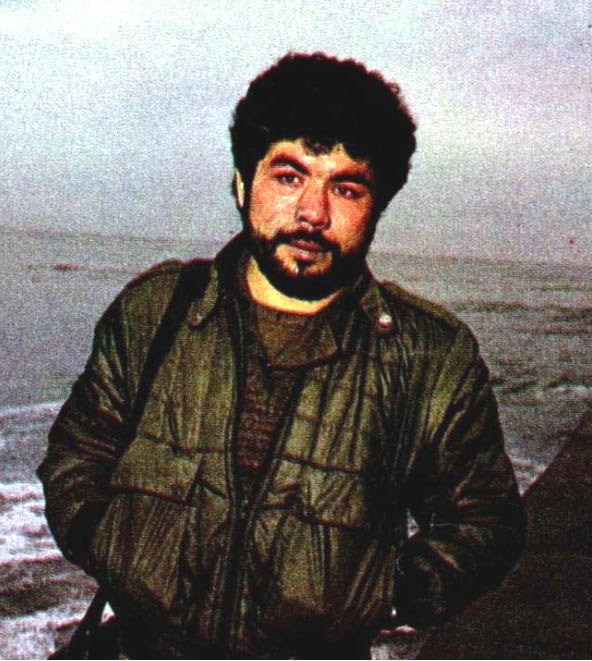
- Palma in 1983

Personal information
- Born: 1 January 1956 La Tigra, Chaco, Argentina
- Died: 28 June 2021 (aged 65) Mar del Plata, Buenos Aires Province, Argentina
- Height: 5 ft 4 1/2 in (164 cm)
- Weight: Super bantamweight

Boxing career
- Stance: Orthodox

Boxing record
- Total fights: 62
- Wins: 52
- Win by KO: 20
- Losses: 5
- Draws: 5

Sergio Víctor Palma (1 January 1956 – 28 June 2021) was an Argentine who was the World Boxing Association's world Super Bantamweight boxing champion from 1980 until 1982.

== Professional career ==
Palma was born in the town of La Tigra. He made his professional debut on 15 January 1976, he fought for his first world title in 1979 when he faced Ricardo Cardona but came up just short losing a close decision. He would not waste his second opportunity when he faced reigning champion Leo Randolph the following year and stopped him in the fifth round to become WBA super bantamweight champion. His would go on to defend the title five times, with his final defense coming against former champion Jorge Luján, before Leo Cruz beat him in a rematch for the title. After the loss. He would fight only 6 times over 8 years, finally retiring from the sport in 1990.

== Professional boxing record ==
| 62 fights | 52 wins | 5 losses |
|---|---|---|
| By knockout | 20 | 1 |
| By decision | 31 | 3 |
| By disqualification | 1 | 1 |
| Draws | 5 | |

| No. | Result | Record | Opponent | Type | Round, time | Date | Location | Notes |
|---|---|---|---|---|---|---|---|---|
| 62 | Win | 52–5–5 | Juan Domingo Nogueira | PTS | 10 | 1990-08-10 | General Arenales, Argentina | |
| 61 | Win | 51–5–5 | Hugo Roberto Villarruel | PTS | 10 | 1989-12-15 | Club Ciclista Juninense, Junín, Argentina | |
| 60 | Draw | 50–5–5 | Raúl Gómez | PTS | 10 | 1985-01-04 | Centro de Educacion Física, Mar del Plata, Argentina | |
| 59 | Loss | 50–5–4 | Juan Domingo Malvarez | KO | 6 (10) | 1983-06-04 | Estadio Luna Park, Buenos Aires, Argentina | |
| 58 | Win | 50–4–4 | Esteban Apolinario Bustos | TKO | 6 (6) | 1983-05-20 | Mar del Plata, Argentina | |
| 57 | Win | 49–4–4 | Ramon Fernando Sosa | PTS | 10 | 1983-04-09 | Estadio Luna Park, Buenos Aires, Argentina | |
| 56 | Loss | 48–4–4 | Leo Cruz | UD | 15 | 1982-06-12 | Convention Center, Miami Beach, Florida, U.S. | Lost WBA super-bantamweight title |
| 55 | Win | 48–3–4 | Américo Marino Suárez | PTS | 10 | 1982-04-02 | Formosa, Argentina | |
| 54 | Win | 47–3–4 | Jorge Luján | UD | 15 | 1982-01-15 | Estadio Chateau Carreras, Córdoba, Argentina | Retained WBA super-bantamweight title |
| 53 | Win | 46–3–4 | Vichit Muangroi-et | UD | 15 | 1981-10-03 | Estadio Luna Park, Buenos Aires, Argentina | Retained WBA super-bantamweight title |
| 52 | Win | 45–3–4 | Ricardo Cardona | TKO | 12 (15), 1:44 | 1981-08-15 | Estadio Luna Park, Buenos Aires, Argentina | Retained WBA super-bantamweight title |
| 51 | Win | 44–3–4 | Juan Carlos Totaro | KO | 2 (10) | 1981-07-03 | San Miguel de Tucumán, Argentina | |
| 50 | Win | 43–3–4 | Danilo Batista | KO | 9 (10) | 1981-05-07 | Caleta Olivia, Argentina | |
| 49 | Win | 42–3–4 | Leo Cruz | UD | 15 | 1981-04-04 | Estadio Luna Park, Buenos Aires, Argentina | Retained WBA super-bantamweight title |
| 48 | Win | 41–3–4 | Máximo Ballesteros | KO | 4 (10) | 1981-02-13 | Rosario, Argentina | |
| 47 | Win | 40–3–4 | Hugo Fica | KO | 3 (10) | 1980-12-20 | Resistencia, Argentina | |
| 46 | Win | 39–3–4 | Ulises Morales | TKO | 9 (15), 1:20 | 1980-11-08 | Estadio Luna Park, Buenos Aires, Argentina | Retained WBA super-bantamweight title |
| 45 | Win | 38–3–4 | Leo Randolph | TKO | 5 (15), 1:12 | 1980-08-09 | Spokane Coliseum, Spokane, Washington, U.S. | Won WBA super-bantamweight title |
| 44 | Win | 37–3–4 | Juan José Brizuela | PTS | 10 | 1980-06-07 | Pergamino, Argentina | |
| 43 | Win | 36–3–4 | Juan Carlos Totaro | PTS | 10 | 1980-05-17 | Mar del Plata, Argentina | |
| 42 | Loss | 35–3–4 | Ricardo Cardona | UD | 15 | 1979-12-15 | Plaza de Toros, Barranquilla, Colombia | For WBA super-bantamweight title |
| 41 | Win | 35–2–4 | Miguel Ángel Lobera | KO | 3 (12) | 1979-11-09 | Villa Ángela, Argentina | Won vacant South American super-bantamweight title |
| 40 | Win | 34–2–4 | Néstor Jiménez | PTS | 10 | 1979-10-20 | Estadio Luna Park, Buenos Aires, Argentina | |
| 39 | Win | 33–2–4 | Gilberto López | PTS | 10 | 1979-09-28 | Villa Regina, Argentina | |
| 38 | Win | 32–2–4 | Francisco Acosta | TKO | 7 (10) | 1979-08-10 | Presidencia Roque Sáenz Peña, Argentina | Retained Argentine super-bantamweight title |
| 37 | Win | 31–2–4 | Roberto Walter Haidar | KO | 4 (10) | 1979-07-13 | General Pico, Argentina | |
| 36 | Win | 30–2–4 | Raúl Eduardo Pérez | PTS | 10 | 1979-06-15 | Córdoba, Argentina | |
| 35 | Win | 29–2–4 | Gilberto López | PTS | 10 | 1979-05-18 | Resistencia, Argentina | |
| 34 | Win | 28–2–4 | Gilberto López | PTS | 10 | 1979-05-04 | Caleta Olivia, Argentina | |
| 33 | Win | 27–2–4 | Héctor Hugo López | KO | 5 (10) | 1979-04-06 | San Miguel de Tucumán, Argentina | |
| 32 | Win | 26–2–4 | Rubén Higinio Butiler | TKO | 10 (12) | 1979-03-16 | Bariloche, Argentina | Retained Argentine super-bantamweight title |
| 31 | Win | 25–2–4 | Juan Diego Vega Ramírez | DQ | 3 (10) | 1979-01-27 | Villa Huidobro, Argentina | |
| 30 | Win | 24–2–4 | Gilberto López | UD | 10 | 1978-12-15 | Curuzú Cuatiá, Argentina | |
| 29 | Win | 23–2–4 | Carlos Alberto Betbeder | PTS | 10 | 1978-11-10 | Comodoro Rivadavia, Argentina | |
| 28 | Win | 22–2–4 | Raúl Eduardo Pérez | PTS | 10 | 1978-10-28 | Mar del Plata, Argentina | |
| 27 | Win | 21–2–4 | Arnoldo Agüero | PTS | 12 | 1978-09-30 | Estadio Luna Park, Buenos Aires, Argentina | Retained Argentine super-bantamweight title |
| 26 | Win | 20–2–4 | Rubén Mateo Granado | KO | 10 (12) | 1978-08-12 | Estadio Luna Park, Buenos Aires, Argentina | Retained Argentine super-bantamweight title |
| 25 | Win | 19–2–4 | Juan Carlos Acosta | KO | 3 (10) | 1978-07-21 | Villa Ángela, Argentina | |
| 24 | Win | 18–2–4 | Pablo Lencina | KO | 2 (10) | 1978-07-07 | Curuzú Cuatiá, Argentina | |
| 23 | Win | 17–2–4 | Juan Diego Vega Ramírez | PTS | 10 | 1978-06-16 | Villa Carlos Paz, Argentina | |
| 22 | Win | 16–2–4 | Hugo Melgarejo | PTS | 12 | 1978-05-19 | Bariloche, Argentina | Won vacant South American super-bantamweight title |
| 21 | Win | 15–2–4 | David Juan Carlos González | PTS | 10 | 1978-04-22 | Maximo Paz, Argentina | |
| 20 | Win | 14–2–4 | Benicio Segundo Sosa | TKO | 7 (10) | 1978-04-08 | Sierras Bayas, Argentina | |
| 19 | Win | 13–2–4 | Arnoldo Agüero | TD | 7 (10) | 1978-02-03 | Mar del Plata, Argentina | Retained Argentine super-bantamweight title |
| 18 | Loss | 12–2–4 | Manuel Antonio Almada | DQ | 4 (10) | 1977-12-23 | Coronel Pringles, Argentina | |
| 17 | Draw | 12–1–4 | Carlos Mariano Córdoba | PTS | 10 | 1977-12-09 | Río Tercero, Argentina | |
| 16 | Win | 12–1–3 | Arnoldo Agüero | PTS | 12 | 1977-10-15 | Estadio Luna Park, Buenos Aires, Argentina | Won vacant Argentine super-bantamweight title |
| 15 | Win | 11–1–3 | Jose Teodomiro Casas | TKO | 8 (10) | 1977-09-12 | Estadio Luna Park, Buenos Aires, Argentina | |
| 14 | Draw | 10–1–3 | Hugo José Emer | PTS | 10 | 1977-07-13 | Villa Carlos Paz, Argentina | |
| 13 | Win | 10–1–2 | Ricardo Gómez | PTS | 10 | 1977-04-22 | Reconquista, Argentina | |
| 12 | Win | 9–1–2 | Juan Aravena | PTS | 10 | 1977-03-25 | Bariloche, Argentina | |
| 11 | Loss | 8–1–2 | Felix González | PTS | 10 | 1977-03-09 | Villa Carlos Paz, Argentina | |
| 10 | Draw | 8–0–2 | Gilberto López | PTS | 10 | 1977-01-19 | Villa Carlos Paz, Argentina | |
| 9 | Draw | 8–0–1 | Jose Teodomiro Casas | PTS | 10 | 1976-12-04 | Villa Carlos Paz, Argentina | |
| 8 | Win | 8–0 | Jose Vicario | PTS | 10 | 1976-09-29 | Estadio Luna Park, Buenos Aires, Argentina | |
| 7 | Win | 7–0 | Romualdo Agramonte | RTD | 7 (8) | 1976-08-06 | Trenque Lauquen, Argentina | |
| 6 | Win | 6–0 | Ricardo Gómez | PTS | 8 | 1976-07-17 | Estadio Luna Park, Buenos Aires, Argentina | |
| 5 | Win | 5–0 | Hector Ramón Barreto | PTS | 6 | 1976-06-11 | Villaguay, Argentina | |
| 4 | Win | 4–0 | Emilio Haedo | PTS | 6 | 1976-05-08 | Estadio Luna Park, Buenos Aires, Argentina | |
| 3 | Win | 3–0 | Jose Horacio Izquierdo | PTS | 6 | 1976-04-07 | Estadio Luna Park, Buenos Aires, Argentina | |
| 2 | Win | 2–0 | Manuel Muñoz | RTD | 4 (6) | 1976-02-15 | Mar del Plata, Argentina | |
| 1 | Win | 1–0 | Ricardo Gómez | PTS | 6 | 1976-01-15 | Pergamino, Argentina | |

== Death ==
Palma resided in Mar del Plata where he died from complications related to COVID-19 on 28 June 2021, at the age of 65.

== See also ==
- List of world super-bantamweight boxing champions

Sporting positions
Regional boxing titles
| New title | Argentine super-bantamweight Champion; October 15, 1977 – 1980; Vacated | Vacant Title next held by Cesar Alfredo Villarruel |
| Vacant Title last held by Rubén Váldez | South American super-bantamweight Champion; May 19, 1978 – 1978; Vacated | Vacant Title next held by Rubén Váldez |
| Vacant Title last held by Rubén Váldez | South American super-bantamweight Champion; November 9, 1979 – August 9, 1980; Won world title | Vacant Title next held by Cesar Alfredo Villarruel |
World boxing titles
| Preceded by Leo Randolph | WBA super-bantamweight champion August 9, 1980 – June 12, 1982 | Succeeded by Leo Cruz |
Awards
| Previous: Diego Maradona | Olimpia de Oro; 1980 | Next: Marcelo Alexandre |
