= Leo Cruz =

Dominican Republic boxer

Personal information
- Nickname: Leo
- Nationality: Dominican
- Born: Leonardo Cruz; January 17, 1953 (age 73) Santiago de los Caballeros, Dominican Republic
- Height: 5 ft 5 1/2 in (166 cm)
- Weight: Super bantamweight

Boxing career
- Stance: Orthodox

Boxing record
- Total fights: 51
- Wins: 41
- Win by KO: 18
- Losses: 8
- Draws: 2

Leonardo Cruz (born January 17, 1953, in Santiago de los Caballeros, Dominican Republic), better known in the world of boxing as Leo Cruz, was a world Jr. Featherweight champion from the Dominican Republic. He is the younger brother of former lightweight world champion of boxing Carlos Cruz.

== Personal ==
Leo was the brother of Carlos Cruz. Carlos had conquered the world Lightweight title by beating Carlos Ortiz in 1968, but lost his life in a plane crash on February 15, 1970 that killed all 102 passengers and crew on board.

== Early life ==
Leo moved to Puerto Rico early in the 1970s, and began identifying himself as half Puerto Rican almost immediately.

== Pro career ==
He began his successful professional boxing career in Puerto Rico, with a string of wins. Despite having beaten future two time world champion Lupe Pintor, however, Cruz was still a virtual unknown when given a chance to win the WBC world Jr. Featherweight championship. Despite losing by a knockout in the 13th round against world champion Wilfredo Gómez, his stock around the boxing world rose after that fight. Cruz kept on fighting, and winning, until he was given a second world title try, this time by the WBA world champion Sergio Victor Palma, in Buenos Aires. Cruz was beaten by a decision in 15 by the Argentine world champion, but in a rematch on 12 June 1982 at Miami, Cruz became world champion by defeating Palma by a decision, also in 15 rounds.

Cruz in his first defense knocked out Benito Badilla of Chile in eight rounds, at Roberto Clemente Coliseum in San Juan. When Gómez left his WBC title vacant soon after, Cruz became recognized by most fans as the universal world champion. Then, he defeated South Korean challenger Soon-Hyun Chung, by decision in 15; after dropping him in round eight; also in San Juan. In his first defense at his home country, Cruz put his title on the line in August 1983 against Nicaraguan challenger Cleo Garcia at Santo Domingo. Cruz retained the title by a decision.

With a defense against Puerto Rican Victor Luvi Callejas looming ahead, Cruz went to Milan in February 1984, and, while defending his crown against Italian Loris Stecca, was stopped in round 12, therefore losing the WBA world junior featherweight title.

== Comeback ==
Cruz attempted a comeback in 1985, winning one fight, but retiring for good after losing a second comeback fight in 1989.

Achievements
Preceded by Sergio Victor Palma	WBA Super Bantamweight Champion; June 12, 1982 - February 22, 1984	Succeeded by Loris Stecca
