= Leo Randolph =

American boxer

Personal information
- Born: Leonard Randolph; February 27, 1958 (age 68) Columbus, Mississippi, US
- Height: 5 ft 5 in (165 cm)
- Weight: Super bantamweight

Boxing career
- Reach: 66 in (168 cm)
- Stance: Orthodox

Boxing record
- Total fights: 19
- Wins: 17
- Win by KO: 9
- Losses: 2
Medal record
Representing the United States
Olympic Games
Gold medal – first place	1976 Montreal	Flyweight

Leo Randolph (born February 27, 1958) is an American former boxer, who won the Flyweight Gold medal at the 1976 Summer Olympics.

== Amateur career ==
Randolph had an outstanding amateur career. Randolph was a product of the Tacoma Boys Club amateur program, along with fellow Olympic Gold Medalist Sugar Ray Seales, and future world champions Rocky Lockridge and Johnny Bumphus. Randolph was trained as an amateur and professional by Joe Clough, the head trainer at the Tacoma Boys Club. In 1975 he was the National Golden Gloves Flyweight champion. He was a National AAU flyweight champion, and was the 1976 Olympic Flyweight Gold Medalist.

Leo Randolph's 1976 Montreal Olympic boxing results were as follows:

- 1st round bye
- Defeated Massoudi Samatou (Togo) walkover
- Defeated Constantin Gruiescu (Romania) 4–1
- Defeated Davy Larmour (Ireland) 4–1
- Defeated Leszek Błażyński (Poland) 4–1
- Defeated Ramón Duvalón (Cuba) 3–2

== Professional career ==
Randolph turned pro in 1978. In 1980, with a record of 16–1, he challenged Ricardo Cardona for the WBA Super Bantamweight Title in a bout held in Seattle. Randolph won via TKO in the 15th round. In his next fight, he lost his title to Sergio Victor Palma via TKO in the 5th. Randolph retired after the bout. He currently holds the record for the earliest retirement ever by a former professional world boxing champion, and at two years and fifty days, Randolph also holds the record for the shortest career for any world boxing champion.

== Randolph-Palma fight ==
After winning the World Boxing Association super bantamweight championship from Ricardo Cardona on May 4, 1980, Randolph made his first title defense versus Argentina's Sergio Palma three months later in Spokane, WA on August 9, 1980. The bout was nationally televised. Palma was not generally known to have an aggressive style or be a hard puncher, but he immediately went on the offensive from the opening bell. Palma staggered Randolph early in the first round, staggered him again, and then floored the champion twice before the round ended. Pressing his advantage, Palma dominated round two, clearly overwhelming the young champion. Randolph rallied in both rounds three and four by boxing defensively, but Palma reasserted himself in round five. Randolph was knocked down for the third time in the contest and rose on shaky legs. Referee Stanley Christodoulou counted beyond the mandatory eight count as Randolph stood groggily with his right hand draped over the top rope. He stopped the fight at 1:12 of the round, ruling that Randolph was in no condition to continue. According to an article written by Jim Benagh in the November 1980 edition of The Ring magazine, Randolph, a deeply religious man, said he did not have the necessary killer instinct to continue as a professional boxer and voluntarily chose to retire from the ring at age 22.

== Personal life ==
Randolph later returned to his hometown of Tacoma. He worked for Pierce Transit as a bus driver and later supervisor from 1988 until 2023, when he retired. His son, Randolph Jr., was also a Pierce Transit driver.

== Professional boxing record ==
19 fights	17 wins	2 losses
By knockout	9	1
By decision	8	1
Draws	0	

No.	Result	Record	Opponent	Type	Round, time	Date	Location	Notes
19	Loss	17–2	Sergio Victor Palma	TKO	5 (15), 1:12	9 Aug 1980	Spokane Coliseum, Spokane, Washington, U.S.	Lost WBA super-bantamweight title
18	Win	17–1	Ricardo Cardona	TKO	15 (15), 1:31	4 May 1980	Seattle Center Coliseum, Seattle, Washington, U.S.	Won WBA super-bantamweight title
17	Win	16–1	Tony Rocha	KO	2 (10)	28 Mar 1980	U. of Puget Sound Fieldhouse, Tacoma, Washington, U.S.	
16	Win	15–1	Baby Kid Chocolate	UD	10	26 Jan 1980	Sports Arena, Los Angeles, California, U.S.	
15	Win	14–1	Joe Kid Zaldivar	TKO	2 (10)	12 Jan 1980	Hyatt House Lake Tahoe, Stateline, U.S.	
14	Win	13–1	Tony Cisneros	KO	3 (10)	27 Nov 1979	Sports Arena, Los Angeles, California, U.S.	
13	Win	12–1	Oscar Muniz	SD	10	27 Oct 1979	Sports Arena, Los Angeles, California, U.S.	
12	Win	11–1	Jose Luis Bautista	UD	10	22 Sep 1979	Sports Arena, Los Angeles, California, U.S.	
11	Win	10–1	Darryl Jones	PTS	10	25 Mar 1979	Civic Auditorium, Santa Monica, California, U.S.	
10	Win	9–1	Alfonso Cirillo	TKO	5 (10)	25 May 1979	Spectrum, Philadelphia, Pennsylvania, U.S.	
9	Loss	8–1	David Capo	SD	8	20 Apr 1979	Felt Forum, New York City, New York, U.S.	
8	Win	8–0	Tony Hernandez	RTD	4 (8)	15 Dec 1978	Westchester County Center, White Plains, New York, U.S.	
7	Win	7–0	Ralph Roman	KO	2 (8)	1 Dec 1978	Community Center, Cohoes, New York, U.S.	
6	Win	6–0	Fernando Martinez	UD	8	14 Nov 1978	Ice World, Totowa, New Jersey, U.S.	
5	Win	5–0	Carlos Zayas	TKO	1 (8), 2:20	1 Nov 1978	Kiel Auditorium, Saint Louis, Missouri, U.S.	
4	Win	4–0	Eddie Logan	UD	8	5 Oct 1978	Seattle Center Coliseum, Seattle, Washington, U.S.	
3	Win	3–0	Marcial Santiago	UD	6	17 Aug 1978	Ice World, Totowa, New Jersey, U.S.	
2	Win	2–0	Tony Reed	UD	8	12 Jul 1978	Municipal Auditorium, Kansas City, Missouri, U.S.	
1	Win	1–0	Alfonso del Gadillo	KO	2 (6)	20 Jun 1978	Seattle Center Coliseum, Seattle, Washington, U.S.	

== Honors ==
- 2005 Inductee into the Tacoma-Pierce County Sports Hall of Fame

== See also ==
- List of super-bantamweight boxing champions

Achievements
Preceded by Ricardo Cardona	WBA super bantamweight Champion; May 4, 1980 – August 9, 1980	Succeeded by Sergio Victor Palma
