= Alberto Dávila =

American boxer

- KO Magazine poster of Dávila from 1983

Personal information
- Nickname: Alberto
- Born: Albert Dávila; August 10, 1954 (age 72) United States
- Height: 5 ft 3 in (1.60 m)
- Weight: Bantamweight

Boxing career

Boxing record
- Total fights: 67
- Wins: 56
- Win by KO: 26
- Losses: 10
- No contests: 1

Albert "Alberto" Dávila (born August 10, 1954) is an American former professional boxer who was the World Boxing Council (WBC) bantamweight champion of the world. His career spanned the 1970s and 1980s in the bantamweight division, and his reign as world champion occurred in parts of 1983 and 1984. Dávila lost world bantamweight championships matches three times, and temporarily left the sport. After his return, he was given a fourth title fight, versus Kiko Bejines, in 1983. Trailing after 11 rounds, Dávila scored a knockout of Bejines to win the title, but Bejines died shortly afterward due to injuries suffered during the fight. Following one successful title defense, Dávila suffered back injuries, leading the WBC to strip him of his title. He later fought in two more world championship fights, losing both. Dávila is a member of the World Boxing Hall of Fame.

== Boxing career ==
=== Early life and career ===
Originally from Texas, and later Pomona, California, Dávila, who is of Mexican descent, took up boxing at the age of 12, and worked out daily at a boxing gym for six years. He graduated from Pomona Garey High School. In his professional debut, on March 1, 1973, Dávila defeated Carlos Villareal in a four-round bout decided on points. After 13 consecutive victories, he lost for the first time against Cecil Escobido in July 1974 by a split decision. Dávila boxed with many of the best boxers of the bantamweight division during the following years. He beat Lupe Pintor by a 10-round decision in 1976, and lost to Wilfredo Gómez by a knockout in Puerto Rico, the first fight in which he was knocked out. In 1978, Dávila challenged Carlos Zarate for the WBC's world title, losing by a knockout. Later that year, he fought for the World Boxing Association championship against Panama's Jorge Luján. The bout took place in the Louisiana Superdome, and was part of the undercard for a world heavyweight championship fight between Muhammad Ali and Leon Spinks. The fight ended in a decision victory for Luján. After Pintor beat Zarate for the WBC title, Dávila was given a second chance at that belt in a 1980 rematch with the Mexican world champion, and lost by a 15-round decision. At one point, he retired from boxing for a time, working as a beer delivery man. Dávila was inactive for all of 1981, returning in early 1982 and going seven fights without a loss through April 1983.

=== Kiko Bejines fight ===
In March 1983, Pintor suffered a motorcycle accident and was forced into a lengthy absence, leaving the WBC bantamweight crown vacant. The WBC assigned its number one challenger, Dávila, to face its third-ranked fighter, Kiko Bejines, for the interim title. The fight was held in Los Angeles, and most of it was described by Associated Press sports writer Ken Peters as "uneventful". Bejines held a lead on two of the three judges' scorecards at the end of 11 rounds (the third had the fight even), and Dávila rushed out of his corner and attacked Bejines right away in round 12. With 25 seconds elapsed in the round, a right hand to Bejines' chin struck, followed by a pair of left hands and a right. Bejines fell to the floor and was counted out, giving Dávila the victory and WBC interim bantamweight championship. Unconscious after the fight, Bejines was airlifted to a nearby hospital and revealed to be in critical condition. He died as a result of his injuries. Dávila stayed at the medical center where Bejines was into the late night hours following the fight, and later said that he was "in mourning with (Bejines') family."

=== WBC title reign ===
Pintor moved into the super bantamweight division, and Dávila eventually became the full WBC bantamweight champion. He returned to the ring two months after the Bejines bout for a fight against Julio Rodrigues in which the WBC title was not at stake. In the summer of 1984, he defended the title against Dominican Enrique Sanchez in Miami, in a fight held outdoors. The early rounds saw Sanchez take control of the contest; an eight-punch flurry by him in round two caused Dávila to stagger. However, the fight turned in round six, as rain fell onto the ring. Dávila scored a knockdown near the end of round ten, and continued his attack on Sanchez at the start of the next round, earning a technical knockout to retain his title. After the fight, he compared the rain to "holy water", saying "It revived me. It was a miracle."

The WBC stated that Dávila would automatically give up his championship if he did not fight Pintor by August 15, 1984. A title defense was instead scheduled on September 14, 1984, versus Miguel Lora, but in a sparring session two weeks before the fight date, Dávila injured his back. This led to a postponement. Later, he worsened his injury while doing yardwork, leading to a yearlong absence from fighting. As a result, his belt was stripped by the WBC; it was officially vacated in the WBC's rankings on March 23, 1985.

=== Later career ===
In 1987, he attempted to become a world champion again by traveling to Colombia and challenging Lora, but he lost a 12-round decision. He won a few fights after his loss to Lora, including a decision victory over Edel Geronimo in March 1987.

His next fight came three months later against Frankie Duarte, whom he had knocked out in a 1977 bout. The North American Boxing Federation (NABF) bantamweight championship was at stake, along with California's title in the division. Despite a left eye that had a cut over it, Dávila was leading on the judges' scorecards entering the 10th round. With 51 seconds left in the round, a doctor stopped the bout due to the cut, giving a technical knockout win to Duarte. Dávila filed an official protest, seeking to have the result overturned. He claimed that an accidental headbutt during round four caused the cut; under the rules of the NABF, fights halted after three rounds went to a judges' decision. The protest was voted on in July by California's State Athletic Commission; the voters deadlocked 3–3, leaving the result unchanged. In a bout held at the Great Western Forum in Inglewood, California on November 3, 1987, against Mexico's Juan Estrada, Dávila suffered an accidental headbutt and was given the victory through a technical decision.

The NABF bantamweight championship was later vacated by the federation due to Duarte's "inactivity". Dávila was matched against Gil Contreras for the belt in April 1988, with a second WBC title match against Lora promised to him if he won. After scoring an eighth-round knockdown of Contreras, Dávila narrowly won a unanimous decision; all three judges had him ahead by either one or two points. The rematch versus Lora was scheduled at the Great Western Forum for August 1. Dávila, nearly 34 at the time, was the oldest bantamweight championship participant. For the second time, Dávila lost to Lora by a judges' decision after 12 rounds. Following the fight, he announced his retirement. His final win–loss record has been given alternately as 55–10–1 and 56–10 with one no contest.

== Fighting style ==
Dávila was not considered a powerful puncher during his career, with fewer than half his career wins coming by knockout. Instead, he was thought of as a strong technical boxer. Los Angeles Times columnist Jim Murray called Dávila "a picture boxer", saying that he fought "with his brains instead of his face." Murray credited Dávila's style to his childhood gym experience, when he discovered that he could avoid being punched if his opponent made the first move. Scott Ostler, another Los Angeles Times columnist, wrote of Dávila, "There's nothing marketable about him, except for one thing. He can fight." However, Dávila did attempt to gain support from Latino fans by fighting as Alberto Dávila, rather than using his given name, Albert.

== Later life and personal life ==
Following his career as a boxer, Dávila began to work as a trainer. However, he quit in 1995 after one of the fighters he trained, David Kamau, lost to Julio César Chávez in a decision he disagreed with; he believed that Kamau would not have been able to win a decision, regardless of the circumstances. He later said, "I thought to myself, I can't do this to a fighter. I can't betray him, so I got out. Dávila then worked in Irvine, California, as a laborer. In 1997, the World Boxing Hall of Fame inducted him. As of 2007, he resided in Upland. Dávila got married in 1975; he had met his wife, Roberta, in high school. The couple has six children: three sons and daughters each. One of their daughters, Alyssa, played soccer at the University of Southern California, and was a member of the Trojans' 2007 National Collegiate Athletic Association Women's Soccer Championship-winning team.

World boxing titles
Preceded by Lupe Pintor; Vacated	WBC Bantamweight Champion; 1 September 1983 – 23 March 1985; Vacated; Initially interim title	Succeeded by Daniel Zaragoza
