= San Bernardo, Chaco =

San Bernardo
- Town
- Location in Argentina
- Coordinates: 27°16′S 60°42′W
- Country: Argentina
- Province: (Chaco Province) Chaco
- Department: O'Higgins
- 2nd level Municipality: San Bernardo
- Founded: June 28, 1933
- Elevation: 79 m (259 ft)

Population ((2001 census [INDEC]))
  - Total: 11,101
- Time zone: UTC−3 (ART)
- CPA Base: H 3701
- Area code: +54 3735
- Climate: Cfa

San Bernardo is a town in Chaco Province, Argentina. It is the head town of the O'Higgins Department.

== Economy ==
The local economy is based on agriculture and forestry, the main produce being cotton, soya, sunflowers and wheat.
