= Alberto Sandoval =

American boxer

Personal information
- Nickname: SuperFly
- Born: Alberto Sandoval; March 12, 1958 (age 68) Pomona, California
- Height: 5 ft 9 in (175 cm)
- Weight: Featherweight; Super Bantamweight; Bantamweight

Boxing career
- Reach: 71 in (180 cm)
- Stance: Orthodox

Boxing record
- Total fights: 37
- Wins: 32
- Win by KO: 21
- Losses: 5

Alberto Sandoval (born 12 March 1958) is an American former professional boxer and is the older brother of former World Boxing Association Champion, Richie Sandoval.

== Early life ==
Sandoval was born in Pomona, California, a city famous in pugilistic circles as a hotbed for young boxing prospects, including Shane Mosley. His brother Richie Sandoval was a popular fighter in the 1980s and was the WBA Bantamweight champion.

== Amateur career ==
Sandoval won the 1973 National AAU Championship at flyweight, by defeating Puerto Rican-American Claudio Rivera of the Air Force by decision. He defeated amateur standout Brendan Dunne at the U.S. vs. Ireland duals of 1973.

== Professional career ==
In May 1977, Sandoval upset title contender Paddy Maguire in a bout at the Grand Olympic Auditorium in Los Angeles, California.

=== WBC Bantamweight Championship ===
On September 2, 1980, Sandoval fought World Boxing Council Bantamweight champion, Lupe Pintor at The Olympic Auditorium in Los Angeles California. They fought for twelve rounds with Pintor defending his title. Pintor won by twelfth round knockout.

== See also ==
- Notable boxing families
