= Jorge Luján =

Panamanian boxer (born 1955)

Personal information
- Nickname: Mocho
- Born: March 18, 1955 (age 71) Colón, Panama
- Height: 5 ft 5 1/2 in (166 cm)
- Weight: Bantamweight; Super bantamweight

Boxing career
- Reach: 67 1/2 in (171 cm)
- Stance: Orthodox

Boxing record
- Total fights: 36
- Wins: 27
- Win by KO: 16
- Losses: 9

Jorge Luján (born March 18, 1955) is a Panamanian who was a professional boxer and fought many top-flight boxers and several champions during the 1970s and 1980s. Luján is the former Lineal and WBA Bantamweight world champion. He was managed by Aurelio Cortez.

== Professional boxing career ==
Luján was born in Colon, and began his professional boxing career by knocking out one Baby San Blas III in one round on June 16, 1973, at Gimnasio Nuevo Panama (now Roberto Durán Arena).

Luján proceeded with another first-round knockout, this one of a fighter named Tranquita Brown. He ran a record of 4–0 with 2 knockouts and then met future Guty Espadas world title challenger Alex Santana, 0–1 at the time. He defeated Santana on January 19, 1974, by a second-round knockout at Gimnasio Neco de la Guardia in Panama City.

Luján then met Socrates Batoto, a boxer who had fought in seven countries and had challenged Betulio Gonzalez for his WBC world Flyweight title and who would later challenge Alfonso Zamora for his Lineal and WBA world Bantamweight title. Batoto was 15–3 with 6 knockouts. Luján knocked Batoto out in round six on July 20, 1974, at the Nuevo Panama gym.

Jorge Luján obtained three more wins, including one over 10–2–2 prospect John Cajina, before going against Reyes Arnal, who was 5–1–2 and who'd later on lose a close, 15 round split decision to Miguel Canto in a challenge for the Hall of Famer's WBC world Flyweight title. On June 21, 1975, Luján scored a fifth-round technical knockout win over Arnal.

Luján kept winning, beating his five next opponents, including 18–3–1 Juanito Herrera (not the Juan Herrera who won the WBA world Flyweight title), before meeting Gilberto Illueca, who ten months before had lost to Zamora in a world title try. Luján and Illueca, 25–4, fought on May 14, 1977, with Luján losing his status as an undefeated boxer by a close, 10- round majority decision, the two judges who voted against Luján deeming him loser by only one point each.

On July 30, 1977, Luján boxed trial-horse Jaime Ricardo, 7–5–1 before their bout, and dispatched him with a seventh-round technical knockout victory. Now 16–1, Luján then had his first professional bout to be held abroad, when he traveled to Colombia to face the future Wilfredo Gómez world title challenger, Jose Cervantes, brother of Antonio "Kid Pambele" Cervantes, at Coliseo El Pueblo in Cali, on September 2, 1977. Luján suffered his second defeat in three fights when deemed points loser after ten rounds with Cervantes.

== World championship ==
Despite having lost his previous bout to Cervantes, Luján received a world title try in his next bout, facing the hard-hitting and popular champion, Zamora, 29–1 with all 29 wins by knockout coming in. Despite being recognized as Lineal and WBA Bantamweight world champion, Zamora had also lost his last fight, a non-title affair to WBC world champion Carlos Zarate. On November 19, 1977, in what also constituted Luján's debut in the United States as a professional boxer at the Los Angeles Sports Arena in Los Angeles, California, Luján built a six-point lead in one judge's scorecard and four point leads in the other two scorecards before becoming world champion by knocking Zamora out in round ten.

== Title defenses ==
Luján was a busy champion, defending his title with success five times in the next three years, including an eleventh-round knockout of Mexico's Roberto Rubaldino at the Freeman Coliseum in San Antonio, Texas after Luján had been dropped in round one on Luján's birthday of March 18, 1978; a fifteen-round decision win over future world champion Alberto Davila at the Superdome, New Orleans, Louisiana as part of the second Muhammad Ali-Leon Spinks fight's undercard on September 15, 1978; his Caesars Palace debut when he beat Cleo Garcia with a technical knockout at 2:29 of round fifteen on April 8, 1979; a rematch win against Roberto Rubaldino, this time stopped in round fifteen at the La Villa Real Convention Center in McAllen, Texas on October 6, 1979, and a ninth-round knockout win over challenger Shuichi Isogami at the Kuramae Kokugikan, Tokyo, Japan on April 2, 1980.

On August 29, 1980, Luján faced Puerto Rican challenger, undefeated Julian Solís, 20–0 at the time of their bout. Luján and Solís had a closely contested bout at the Miami Beach Convention Center in Miami Beach, Florida, but Luján lost his world championship to the Puerto Rican by a split fifteen-round decision. Puerto Rican judge Waldemar Schmidt gave Solís the fight by 144–142, and Panamanian judge Medardo Villalobos saw Luján win by 148–144. This left American judge (and also the fight's referee) Jimmy Rondeau, who scored it for Solís, 144–143.

== Further championship attempts ==
Luján quickly went about trying to regain his title or becoming a champion in another weight division. After Solís lost his title to Jeff Chandler, Luján challenged the new champion on January 31, 1981, at the Franklyn Plaza Hotel in the new champion's hometown of Philadelphia, Pennsylvania. Luján and Chandler fought fifteen rounds, but Chandler won by a unanimous decision to retain the championship.

On August 15, 1981, Luján faced old nemesis Roberto Rubaldino, this time in a 10-round non-title affair. Rubaldino beat Luján by a ten-round majority decision at the Sam Houston Coliseum in Houston, Texas.

Once again, despite coming off defeat-in this case, three losses in a row-the World Boxing Association gave Luján a chance at becoming a world champion for the second time when he was matched with Argentina's Sergio Palma for the latter's WBA recognized world Super Bantamweight title; on January 15, 1982, Palma and Luján boxed at Estadio Chateau Carreras in Cordoba, Argentina, and Palma won by a unanimous decision to retain the crown with scores of 143–139 by Stuart Winston, 145–141 by Carol Polis and 144–140 by Roberto Ramirez Sr.

Luján took off eight months before his next fight, when he was outpointed by WBC world Bantamweight champion Lupe Pintor, 48–5–1, in ten rounds at the Olympic Auditorium at Los Angeles, California, on September 23, 1982. This was not a title fight; it was a preparation bout for Pintor who would later challenge Wilfredo Gómez for Gomez's WBC world Super Bantamweight championship, the Pintor-Luján bout held at the Super-Bantamweight division's weight; the winner of the bout to get a title chance at Gomez.

The Pintor fight marked Luján's fifth loss in a row. Luján started to regroup by boxing Javier Guido on November 13 at Panama City. This was a mismatch as Guido only had one victory in seven bouts. Luján won this bout by an eighth-round knockout.

A more adequate opponent was Francisco Fernandez, reported to have a record of 10–3 when he and Luján squared off on December 18 at Panama City. Luján won this bout by ten rounds points decision, after recovering from an eighth round knockdown. Then, on May 14, 1983, Luján met Mario Miranda, who had just come off an unsuccessful bid for the vacant WBC world Featherweight championship versus Juan Laporte. Luján-Miranda was held at the Nuevo Panama Gym in Panama City and Luján earned a spot among the WBA's top ten Featherweights by outpointing the Colombian over ten rounds.

Another huge mismatch took place on November 26 of 1983 at the Nuevo Panama Gym when Luján, now fighting at Junior Lightweight, took on one Wilson Peraza, who was making his professional boxing debut versus the former world champion. Luján managed to post a ten-round unanimous decision win.

Luján faced a more experienced rival on June 30, 1984, when he fought Colombia's former WBA world Super Bantamweight champion, Ricardo Cardona, who was 26–9–1 coming in. This bout was to determine WBA world Featherweight champion Eusebio Pedroza's next opponent, and Luján won by scoring a tenth-round knockout over the Colombian.

Luján's challenge of Pedroza was a major sporting event in Panama; world title fights between two Panamanians being so few in boxing history (Pedroza-Hector Carrasquilla was, in fact, the first boxing bout in history to pit two Panamanians for a world title). The bout was fought on February 2, 1985, at the Nuevo Panama Gym. The legendary Pedroza, later on inducted to the International Boxing Hall of Fame, was 37–3–1 and making the 19th defense of his world title. Luján won a few rounds on each judge's scorecards, but he was dropped in round fourteen and defeated by a unanimous decision, the three judges giving the fight to the champion by scores of 148–139, 147–140 and 146–141.

== Last bout ==
Luján took off ten months after the Pedroza loss, and returned on December 14, 1985, to face local prospect Jose Marmolejo, who was 11–2 in 13 previous bouts. This fight was for the WBA Fedelatin Featherweight title and it was also held at the Nuevo Panama Gym. Luján was dropped in rounds six and ten and lost a unanimous twelve-round decision, prompting him to retire. Unlike many other famous boxers, Luján never attempted a comeback to professional boxing once retired; he had a record of 27 wins and 9 losses, with 16 wins by knockout; he was never knocked out himself.

== Professional boxing record ==
36 fights	27 wins	9 losses
By knockout	16	0
By decision	11	9

No.	Result	Record	Opponent	Type	Round, time	Date	Location	Notes
36	Loss	27–9	Jose Marmolejo	UD	12 (12)	1985-12-14	Gimnasio Nuevo Panama, Panama City, Panama	For WBA Fedelatin featherweight title
35	Loss	27–8	Eusebio Pedroza	UD	15 (15)	1985-02-02	Gimnasio Nuevo Panama, Panama City, Panama	For WBA & The Ring featherweight titles
34	Win	27–7	Ricardo Cardona	TKO	10 (10)	1984-06-30	Arena Panama Al Brown, Colón, Panama	
33	Win	26–7	Wilson Peroza	UD	10 (10)	1983-11-26	Gimnasio Nuevo Panama, Panama City, Panama	
32	Win	25–7	Mario Miranda	UD	10 (10)	1983-05-14	Gimnasio Nuevo Panama, Panama City, Panama	
31	Win	24–7	Francisco Fernandez	UD	10 (10)	1982-12-18	Gimnasio Nuevo Panama, Panama City, Panama	
30	Win	23–7	Javier Guido	TKO	8 (10)	1982-11-13	Gimnasio Neco de la Guardia, Panama City, Panama	
29	Loss	22–7	Lupe Pintor	UD	10 (10)	1982-09-23	Grand Olympic Auditorium, Los Angeles, California, U.S.	
28	Loss	22–6	Sergio Víctor Palma	UD	15 (15)	1982-01-15	Estadio Chateau Carreras, Córdoba, Argentina	For WBA super-bantamweight title
27	Loss	22–5	Roberto Rubaldino	MD	10 (10)	1981-08-15	Sam Houston Coliseum, Houston, Texas, U.S.	
26	Loss	22–4	Jeff Chandler	UD	15 (15)	1981-01-31	Franklin Plaza Hotel, Philadelphia, Pennsylvania, U.S.	For WBA & The Ring bantamweight titles
25	Loss	22–3	Julian Solís	SD	15 (15)	1980-08-29	Auditorium, Miami Beach, Florida, U.S.	Lost WBA & The Ring bantamweight titles
24	Win	22–2	Shuichi Isogami	TKO	9 (15)	1980-04-02	Kuramae Kokugikan, Tokyo, Japan	Retained WBA & The Ring bantamweight titles
23	Win	21–2	Roberto Rubaldino	KO	15 (15)	1979-10-06	La Villa Real Convention Center, McAllen, Texas, U.S.	Retained WBA & The Ring bantamweight titles
22	Win	20–2	Cleo Garcia	TKO	15 (15)	1979-04-08	Caesars Palace, Paradise, Nevada, U.S.	Retained WBA & The Ring bantamweight titles
21	Win	19–2	Alberto Dávila	UD	15 (15)	1978-09-15	Superdome, New Orleans, Louisiana, U.S.	Retained WBA & The Ring bantamweight titles
20	Win	18–2	Roberto Rubaldino	TKO	11 (15)	1978-03-18	Freeman Coliseum, San Antonio, Texas, U.S.	Retained WBA & The Ring bantamweight titles
19	Win	17–2	Alfonso Zamora	KO	10 (15)	1977-11-19	Sports Arena, Los Angeles, California, U.S.	Won WBA & The Ring bantamweight titles
18	Loss	16–2	Jose Cervantes	UD	10 (10)	1977-09-02	Coliseo El Pueblo, Cali, Colombia	
17	Win	16–1	Jaime Ricardo	TKO	7 (10)	1977-07-30	Arena de Colon, Colón, Panama	
16	Loss	15–1	Gilberto Illueca	MD	10 (10)	1977-05-14	Gimnasio Nuevo Panama, Panama City, Panama	
15	Win	15–0	Juanito Herrera	UD	10 (10)	1977-01-29	Gimnasio Nuevo Panama, Panama City, Panama	
14	Win	14–0	Tony Sanchez	UD	10 (10)	1976-07-17	Gimnasio Nuevo Panama, Panama City, Panama	
13	Win	13–0	Pablito Jimenez	SD	10 (10)	1976-05-15	Gimnasio Nuevo Panama, Panama City, Panama	
12	Win	12–0	Enrique Torres	TKO	7 (10)	1976-01-17	Gimnasio Nuevo Panama, Panama City, Panama	
11	Win	11–0	Catalino Flores	TKO	4 (10)	1975-08-16	Gimnasio Nuevo Panama, Panama City, Panama	
10	Win	10–0	Luis Reyes Arnal	TKO	5 (10)	1975-06-21	Gimnasio Nuevo Panama, Panama City, Panama	
9	Win	9–0	Eliseo Padilla	KO	2 (10)	1975-05-03	Gimnasio Nuevo Panama, Panama City, Panama	
8	Win	8–0	John Cajina	UD	10 (10)	1975-02-15	Gimnasio Nuevo Panama, Panama City, Panama	
7	Win	7–0	Aureliano Castillo	UD	10 (10)	1974-09-14	Gimnasio Nuevo Panama, Panama City, Panama	
6	Win	6–0	Socrates Batoto	KO	6 (10)	1974-07-20	Gimnasio Nuevo Panama, Panama City, Panama	
5	Win	5–0	Alex Guido	KO	2 (8)	1974-01-19	Gimnasio Neco de la Guardia, Panama City, Panama	
4	Win	4–0	Felipe Perez	UD	6 (6)	1973-11-17	Gimnasio Neco de la Guardia, Panama City, Panama	
3	Win	3–0	Carlos Rios	UD	6 (6)	1973-10-06	Gimnasio Neco de la Guardia, Panama City, Panama	
2	Win	2–0	Tranquita Brown	TKO	1 (4)	1973-09-01	Gimnasio Neco de la Guardia, Panama City, Panama	
1	Win	1–0	Baby San Blas III	KO	1 (4)	1973-06-16	Gimnasio Nuevo Panama, Panama City, Panama	

== See also ==
- List of world bantamweight boxing champions

Sporting positions
World boxing titles
Preceded by Alfonso Zamora	WBA bantamweight champion November 19, 1977 – August 29, 1980	Succeeded by Julian Solís
Preceded by Alfonso Zamora	The Ring bantamweight champion November 19, 1977 – August 29, 1980	Succeeded by Julian Solís
