= Ricardo Cardona (boxer) =

Colombian boxer (1952–2015)

Personal information
- Nationality: Colombian
- Born: Ricardo Cardona Cáceres; November 9, 1952 San Basilio, Colombia
- Died: October 12, 2015 (aged 62) Barranquilla, Colombia
- Height: 5 ft 7 1/2 in (171 cm)
- Weight: Super bantamweight

Boxing career
- Reach: 70 in (178 cm)
- Stance: Orthodox

Boxing record
- Total fights: 37
- Wins: 26
- Win by KO: 13
- Losses: 10
- Draws: 1

Ricardo Cardona (November 9, 1952 – October 11, 2015) was a Colombian boxer. He was the younger brother of former flyweight world champion, Prudencio Cardona.

== Professional career ==
Cardona turned pro on September 15, 1973, with a decision over Osvaldo Rojas in Valencia, Venezuela. He won the Colombian super bantamweight title in 1976. On May 7, 1978, he won the WBA World super bantamweight title with a TKO over Hong Soo-hwan in Seoul, South Korea becoming Colombia’s third boxing champion, following Antonio Cervantes and Rodrigo Valdez. He successfully defended the title five times before losing to Leo Randolph in 1980. Cardona fought for four more years, going 5-5, including a loss to Jorge Lujan, before retiring in 1984 with a record of 26-10-1 (13 KOs).

== Personal life ==
His brother, Prudencio Cardona, was also a well-known world champion boxer, making the Cardona brothers one of the small numbers of sibling couples to have reached world championship status in the sport. Ricardo Cardona died at Bonnadona Hospital in Barranquilla, Colombia, after a long bout with cancer.

== Professional boxing record ==
37 fights	26 wins	10 losses
By knockout	13	5
By decision	13	5
Draws	1	

No.	Result	Record	Opponent	Type	Round, time	Date	Location	Notes
37	Loss	26–10–1	Jorge Luján	TKO	10 (10), 2:48	30 Jun 1984	Arena Panama Al Brown, Colón, Panama	
36	Win	26–9–1	Mario Wilson	PTS	10	11 May 1984	Barranquilla, Colombia	
35	Loss	25–9–1	Lee Seung-hoon	KO	6 (10)	20 Mar 1983	Masan Gymnasium, Masan, South Korea	
34	Loss	25–8–1	Hector Cortez	TKO	10 (?)	7 Oct 1982	Guayaquil, Ecuador	
33	Win	25–7–1	Franklin Salas	TKO	8 (10)	15 Jun 1982	Caseta International, Maicao, Colombia	
32	Loss	24–7–1	Felix Rodriguez	UD	10	6 Feb 1982	Gimnasio Nuevo Panama, Panama City, Panama	
31	Win	24–6–1	Humberto Mejia	TKO	7 (?)	4 Dec 1981	Bogata, Colombia	
30	Loss	23–6–1	Sergio Víctor Palma	TKO	12 (15), 1:44	15 Aug 1981	Estadio Luna Park, Buenos Aires, Argentina	For WBA World super-bantamweight title
29	Win	23–5–1	Jose Cueto	PTS	10	17 Jul 1981	Coliseo Humberto Perea, Barranquilla, Colombia	
28	Win	22–5–1	Ralph Barrios	TKO	1 (10)	14 Nov 1980	Jai Alai Fronton, Miami, Florida, U.S.	
27	Loss	21–5–1	Leo Randolph	TKO	15 (15), 1:31	4 May 1980	Seattle Center Coliseum, Seattle, Washington, U.S.	Lost WBA World super-bantamweight title
26	Win	21–4–1	Sergio Víctor Palma	UD	15	15 Dec 1979	Plaza de Toros Monumental del Caribe, Barranquilla, Colombia	Retained WBA World super-bantamweight title
25	Win	20–4–1	Yukio Segawa	UD	15	6 Sep 1979	City Gymnasium, Hachinohe, Venezuela	Retained WBA World super-bantamweight title
24	Win	19–4–1	Soon Hyun Chung	UD	15	23 Jun 1979	Jangchung Arena, Seoul, South Korea	Retained WBA World super-bantamweight title
23	Win	18–4–1	Soon Hyun Chung	SD	15	12 Nov 1978	Jangchung Arena, Seoul, South Korea	Retained WBA World super-bantamweight title
22	Win	17–4–1	Ruben Valdes	UD	15	2 Sep 1978	Plaza de Toros de Cartagena de Indias, Cartagena, Colombia	Retained WBA World super-bantamweight title
21	Win	16–4–1	Soo Hwan Hong	TKO	12 (15), 1:23	6 May 1978	Jangchung Arena, Seoul, South Korea	Won WBA World super-bantamweight title
20	Win	15–4–1	Jesus Caicedo	PTS	10	5 Nov 1977	Maestranza Cesar Giron, Maracay, Venezuela	
19	Win	14–4–1	Francisco Hernandez	KO	8 (?)	4 Jun 1977	Caracas, Venezuela	
18	Win	13–4–1	Guillermo Gomez	TKO	5 (?)	19 Mar 1977	Coliseo Humberto Perea, Barranquilla, Colombia	
17	Loss	12–4–1	Nestor Jimenez	PTS	10	18 Feb 1977	Cartagena, Colombia	
16	Win	12–3–1	Rafael Montes	RTD	6 (12), 3:00	7 Nov 1976	Plaza de Toros de Cartagena de Indias, Cartagena, Colombia	Won Colombian super-bantamweight title
15	Win	11–3–1	Jesus Medina	KO	4 (?)	25 Jul 1976	Valencia, Venezuela	
14	Win	10–3–1	Pedro Vasquez	PTS	10	10 Apr 1976	Caracas, Venezuela	
13	Loss	9–3–1	Oscar Arnal	PTS	10	31 Jan 1976	Caracas, Venezuela	
12	Win	9–2–1	Abraham Meza	KO	8 (?)	14 Dec 1975	Caracas, Venezuela	
11	Loss	9–2–1	Jose Antonio Quijano	PTS	10	11 Oct 1975	Caracas, Venezuela	
10	Win	8–1–1	Idelfonso Bethelmy	TKO	8 (?)	14 Jul 1975	Caracas, Venezuela	
9	Win	7–1–1	Guillermo Gomez	KO	5 (?)	13 Apr 1975	Caracas, Venezuela	
8	Draw	6–1–1	Silvio Diaz	PTS	8	1 Mar 1975	Caracas, Venezuela	
7	Win	6–1	Diego Tovar	KO	7 (?)	15 Feb 1975	Caracas, Venezuela	
6	Win	5–1	Miguel Espinosa	PTS	10	23 Nov 1974	Bogata, Colombia	
5	Loss	4–1	Leslie Moreno	PTS	10	19 May 1974	Barquisimeto, Venezuela	
4	Win	4–0	Osvaldo Rojas	PTS	6	26 Mar 1974	El Poliedro, Caracas, Venezuela	
3	Win	3–0	Juan J Rojas	PTS	6	9 Feb 1974	Caracas, Venezuela	
2	Win	2–0	Manuel Olivares	TKO	4 (?)	17 Nov 1973	Nuevo Circo, Caracas, Venezuela	
1	Win	1–0	Osvaldo Rojas	PTS	4	15 Sep 1973	Valencia, Venezuela	

== See also ==
- List of super-bantamweight boxing champions

Achievements
Preceded by Hong Soo-hwan	WBA super bantamweight champion May 7, 1978 – May 4, 1980	Succeeded by Leo Randolph
