= Clotilde (opera) =

Opera by Carlo Coccia

- Opera by Carlo Coccia
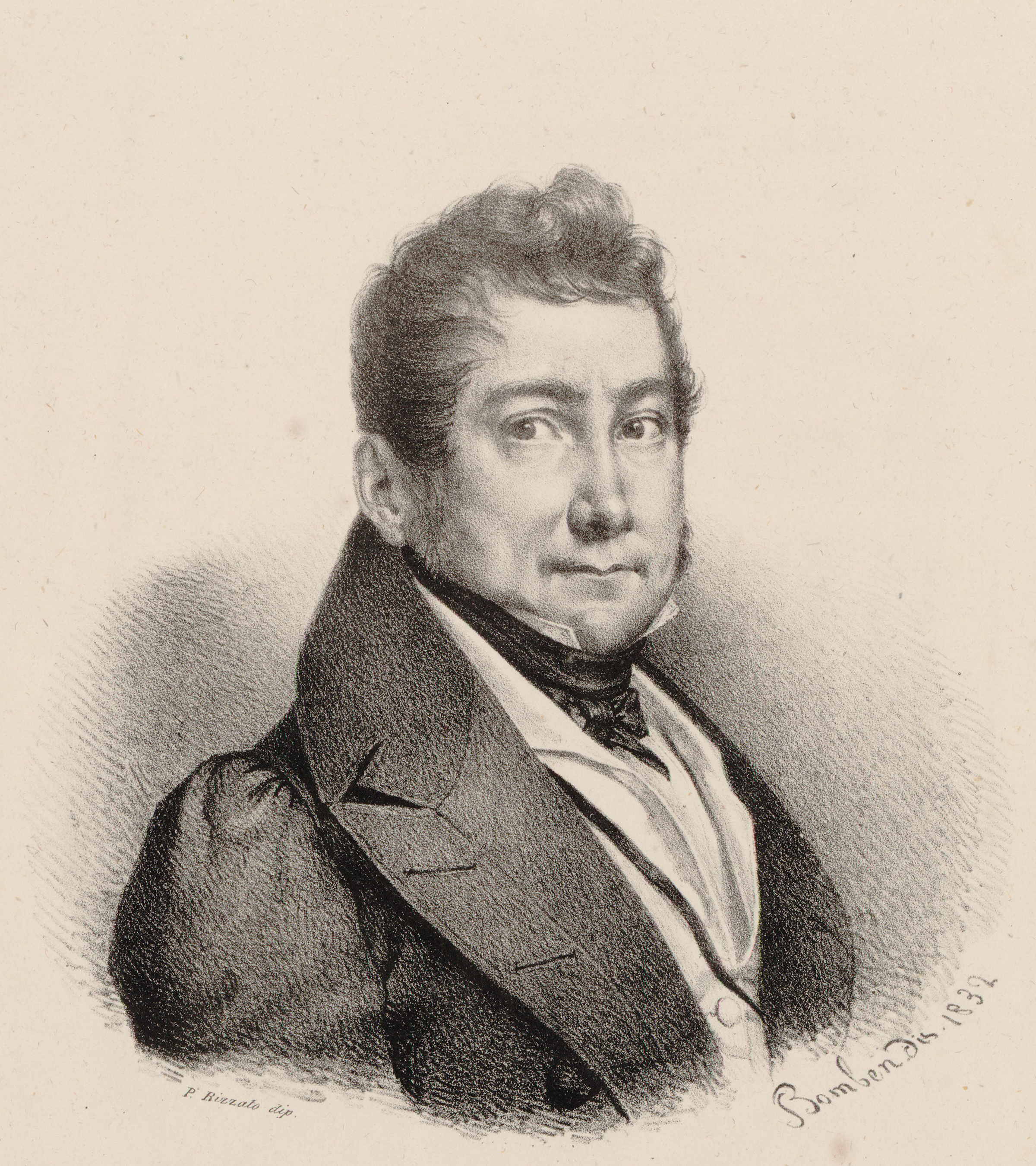
- The composer
- Librettist: Gaetano Rossi
- Language: Italian
- Premiere: 8 June 1815; Teatro San Benedetto, Venice

Clotilde is an opera (melodramma semiserio) in two acts by Carlo Coccia. The Italian-language libretto was by Gaetano Rossi. It premiered on 8 June 1815 at Teatro San Benedetto, Venice.

Clotilde was especially appreciated for the usage of the chorus. A contemporaneous Italian writer wrote: "Nobody after Mayer has understood how a composer can take advantage of a sensible usage of the chorus. Coccia did it in this opera, avoiding those screams heard too often before". Francesco Regli in its Dizionario biografico stated: "With Clotilde Coccia taught how a chorus has to be written".

Clotilde was performed also in Paris in 1821, but it was unsuccessful.

In modern times, this opera was revived for the first time at the Teatro Coccia in Novara, on 7 November 2003. This production was recorded and published on CD. In his review of the Novara performance, which used different versions of the opera, the Italian music critic Giangiorgio Satragni noted "the resounding of features of Rossini's style" and emphasized, among the pieces of the opera, Emerico's cavatina "Soave all'anima" and Clotilde's aria "Deh! Tu guida", but judged the work on the whole as "implacable nineteenth-century operatic routine".

== Roles ==
Roles, voice types
Role	Voice type
Clotilde, daughter of the Count of Cosenza	soprano
Emerico, Count of Monmelliano	tenor
Sivaldo, his squire	bass
Isabella, sister of Sivaldo	soprano
Jacopone, innkeeper	bass
Tartufo, courier of Sivaldo	bass
Agata, innkeeper	soprano
Chorus: knights, officers, mountaineers
Guards, pages, servants of Emerico, mountaineers, countrywomen, young people

== Synopsis ==
=== Act 1 ===
The marriage between the Count Emerico and Clotilde has been arranged, but the two betrothed have never seen personally each other. Emerico's squire Sivaldo has been entrusted with the task of leading Clotilde to the castle, but he tries to deceive Emerico, replacing Clotilde with his sister Isabella. Clotilde should be killed by the courier Tartufo, but Tartufo does not have the courage to carry out the crime and allows Clotilde to flee disguised as peasant. Clotilde asks for help the inhabitants of a nearby village and obtains hospitality from the innkeeper Jacopone, who plans to abuse her.

Short time later, Emerico arrives in the inn, where a party for him and his bride is being prepared. Emerico has made Isabella's acquaintance, convinced that she be Clotilde, and is disappointed by her haughtiness. During the preparations for the party, the same Clotilde plays the role of the bride: she is introduced as a cousin of Jacopone but does not find the strength of revealing her true identity. However, Emerico is enthralled by her gentleness and gives her a rich present. Isabella recognizes Clotilde, is afraid that the deceit be discovered and drags Emerico away

=== Act 2 ===
Clotilde finds the courage to reveal the trickery sending a letter to Emerico by means of Tartufo, then the same Tartufo and Jacopone give evidence in favour of Clotilde. Sivaldo and Isabella try without success to convince Emerico that the true cheat is Clotilde. Emerico is dubious and cannot make a decision. Finally, Clotilde notes that Emerico is wearing a locket that she had sent to him before knowing him. Clotilde defies Isabella to tell what the locket contains and when Isabella does not manage to do that, while Clotilde does, all becomes clear.

Emerico would like to punish Sivaldo and Isabella but Clotilde, happy for the recovered love, asks him to forgive them.

== Recordings ==
2003: Fabrizio Dorsi, Orchestra Sinfonica Carlo Coccia, Bongiovanni GB 2381/2 – Live recording

Clotilde: Adelina Scarabelli
Emerico: Amedeo Moretti
Sivaldo: Daniele Cusari
Isabella: Ornella Vecchierelli

Jacopone: Davide Rocca
Tartufo: Marco Trilli
Agata: Gabrielle Selvaggio
