= Clotilde Rullaud =

French singer, songwriter and composer

Clotilde
- Born: March 1, 1978 (age 48); Reims, France
- Genres: Jazz, improvised music, experimental music, folk, latin jazz, world, pop, chanson
- Occupations: Artistic director, singer, songwriter, Vocalist, composer, filmmaker, producer, vocal coach
- Instruments: flute, voice
- Years active: 2003–present
- Labels: Tzig’Art, Nota Bene Productions
- Website: clotilde.art

Clotilde Rullaud ([kloːtildəʼ ʁʏːlɔ]; born on March 1, 1978, in Reims, France) is an artistic director, singer, vocalist, flutist, composer, filmmaker, producer and vocal coach.

== Early life ==
Rullaud was immersed in the performing arts (music, theatre and dance) from early childhood. At age five she began studying flute and singing, before going on to complete her studies in jazz and improvised music at IACP (Paris) and EDIM (Cachan). She also explored opera singing with tenor Peterson Cowan.

Rullaud's musical identity developed through her travels (including the Balkans, Ireland, Lebanon, and the United States) and her study of different vocal techniques. Her inspirations include artist Meredith Monk and sounds such as fado, tango, Romani music, Turkish music, Persian music, Inuit throat singing and Bulgarian voices.

== Career ==
Rullaud has recorded three albums as a vocalist and flutist. She has also directed and produced a short film, and written and directed a multidisciplinary performance. Throughout her career, she has performed in France, Germany, Australia, Burkina Faso, China, South Korea, Japan, Luxembourg, the Netherlands, Switzerland, Taiwan, the United Kingdom and the United States.

In 2002 and 2003, Rullaud conceived two live shows inspired by her travel diaries: Sur la route des Tziganes and Monsieur Jazz, which were both multidisciplinary pieces for seven performers in which she sang, danced, and narrated.

In 2004, Rullaud started working with the guitar player, Hugo Lippi, with whom she recorded her first album, Live au 7 Lézards, released three years later.

Since 2007, Rullaud has taught at Martina A. Catella's school, Les Globes Trotters, in Paris. She also runs workshops for the festival Les Suds in Arles and for the Ateliers d’ethnomusicologie (ADEM) in Geneva.

March 2008 saw the beginning of a new project by Rullaud called In Extremis, a bass-less quartet with Olivier Hutman (piano), Dano Haider (seven-string guitar) and Antoine Paganotti (drums).

In 2010, Rullaud began collaborating with bandoneon and composer Tristan Macé. On their first project, Le Diable à froid (2010), they performed alongside horn-player Albin Lebossé to explore the musical and literary styles of surrealism, Dadaism and tango.

Next was Tristan Macé's jazz opera Etrangement Bleu (2011). Their most recent project is Fleurs Invincibles – Invincible Flowers (2012), which also features Emmanuel Bex (piano/organ), Yann Cléry (flutes), Laurent Salzard (bass) and Gautier Garrigue (drums). This bilingual project is based on original compositions by Macé, and inspired by texts from American poets of the Beat Generation and black French poets of the 1940s and 50s.

In 2014, Rullaud formed a musical duo with pianist Alexandre Saada named Madeleine & Salomon. Their first album, A Woman's Journey, is a homage to American female protest singers.

In 2017, Rullaud moved to New York City to collaborate with American pianist Chris McCarthy. They created the project Pieces of a Song based on the writings of Beat poet Diane di Prima.

In 2019, Rullaud took part in the Badara festival in Burkina-Faso, her first encounter with this country where she established multiple artistic collaborations. Each stay gave rise to new creations: the French-Burkinese quintet Sankolé, created in January 2020; the Burkinese-Swiss-French quartet KanFiguè, created in January 2021; and the French-Burkinese quartet Djafolo.

In 2021, Rullaud continued her reflections on womanhood by presenting XXY, an interdisciplinary play performed by five musicians and five dancers, accompanied by footage of her music and body in motion [ɛks/ɛks/wʌɪ] (2018). Grégory Dargent was involved as a composer and Mehdi Diouri and Céline Tringali as choreographers.

== Artistic approach ==
=== Random synchronicities ===
noun, neologism. Non-illustrative dialogue between two different artistic disciplines expressing themselves irrespectively of each other, yet simultaneously. Poetry of revealed things.

Rullaud revisits the well-known accidental synchronisms of cinematographic creation that Cocteau had already transposed to live performance through Roland Petit, choreographer of the play Le Jeune Homme et la Mort. She creates the conditions for these "prepared accidents", working on the presence in the moment as momentum.

Through these polyphonic works, each artistic discipline plays its own score. Inspired by the same intention, but fully independent from each other in their creative journey, they raise each other to a vibration that they could not have reached separately, thus avoiding the pitfall of illustration. When these scores meet, accidental synchronicities arise that open up new ways of looking at things, laying the foundations for a possible symbolic revolution.

== Works ==
=== As project leader, artistic director and multidisciplinary artist ===
- 2021 – XXY, polyphonic poetry with five musicians, five dancers and one film. Filmmaker, artistic director, singer, flutist, with Grégory Dargent as composer and Mehdi Diouri and Céline Tringali as choreographers.
- 2018 – XXY [ɛks/ɛks/wʌɪ], a film combining dance, music, singing and visual arts. Filmmaker, producer, editor, co-composer, arranger, flutist and vocalist alongside 30 artists: composers, musicians, dancers.
- 2011 – In Extremis, compositions and covers album. Vocalist, flutist, writer-composer with Olivier Hutman (piano), Dano Haider (seven-string guitar) and Antoine Paganotti (drums).
- 2007 – Live aux 7 Lézards, pop and jazz cover album. Singer in a duo with the guitarist Hugo Lippi.
- 2003 – Monsieur Jazz, multidisciplinary performance. Singer, dancer, narrator and co-writer with Sophie Alour (saxophone and flute), Jean-Baptiste Laya (guitar and co-writer), Jean-Daniel Botta (double bass), Franck Filosa (drums) and Abderr (dance).
- 2002 – Sur la route des Tziganes, multidisciplinary performance. Singer, dancer, storyteller and co-writer with Jean-Baptiste Laya (guitar and co-writer), the musicians of the company O’Djila and the dancer Valentina Casula.

=== As co-lead artist ===
- 2022 – Eastern Spring, a tribute to the oriental and militant pop of the 1960s–1970s. Singer of the duo Madeleine & Salomon with the pianist Alexandre Saada.
- 2022 – 2019 – Pieces of a Song, original compositions, based on the writings of Beat Generation poet Diane di Prima. Vocalist, flutist, writer, and co-composer in a duo with the New-York pianist Chris McCarthy.
- 2016 – A Woman's Journey, homage to American female "protest singers". Singer in the duo Madeleine & Salomon co-founded with the pianist Alexandre Saada.
- 2014 – Lofi Improvisation. Free jazz. Vocalist and co-composer in a duo with the American drummer and percussionist Percival Roman.
- 2013 – Fleurs Invincibles – Invincible Flowers, texts by American poets of the Beat Generation and French black poets of the 1940s–50s set to original music by Tristan Macé. Vocalist with Emmanuel Bex (piano), Yann Cléry (flute), Laurent Salzard (electric and acoustic bass), Gautier Garrigue (drums) and Tristan Macé.
- 2012 – Le diable a froid. Contemporary jazz trio inspired by Dada music. Vocalist with Albin Lebossé (horn) and Tristan Macé (bandoneon and composition).

=== As guest artist ===
- 2022 – Tribute to Radiohead vol.3, Amnesiac Quartet of Sébastien Paindestre (pianist), singer and flutist with Bruno Schorp (double bass) and Antoine Paganotti (drums, voice)
- 2013 – La complainte de la Tour Eiffel by Nicolas Rageau (double bass), singer with Alain Jean-Marie (piano) and Philippe Soirat (drums)
- 2011 – Bestiaire by Philippe Crab
- 2009 – Papillons de Paris by Jean-Daniel Botta
- 2009 – Contretemps by Léonore Boulanger
- 2007 – La flemme parisienne by Léonore Boulanger

== Awards and critics ==
=== Eastern Spring ===
- TTTT, Télérama
- 4 stars, Jazzmagazine
- INDISPENSABLE, Jazz News
- ÉLU, Citizen Jazz

The clip Ma Fatsh Leah, from the album Eastern Spring, has been selected :

- Short film "coup de coeur" at the Carrefour du Cinéma d'Animation 2022

=== XXY [ɛks/ɛks/wʌɪ] ===
- 5 awards and nominations:
  - Best Cinematography at the Shetown Festival in Detroit,
  - Best Emerging Vision at the Arts Triangle Festival in Dallas,
  - Best Music Video at the Paris Short Film Festival,
  - Nomination for the Audience Award at the Athens Video Dance Project
  - Nomination for the Best Experimental Short at Berlin Motion Picture Festival
- Selections in over thirty festivals around the world including Interfilm in Berlin, San Francisco Dance Film Festival, Cine.Dans.Fest, Festival Européen du Film Court, Berlin Feminist Film Week, Nuit Blanche à Paris and Shorts Attack Festival

=== A woman's Journey ===
- 4 stars in All About Jazz (US) and Fono Forum (DE)
- Ranked in the Top 25 albums of February 2018 by KALX 90.7FM Berkeley radio (US)
- Ranked in the Top 5 albums of January 2018 by Paul Glaser on WLFR 91.7 FM (US)
- Ranked in the Top 10 albums of January 2018 by Erin Wolf on WMSE 91.7 FM (US)
- Ranked in the Best albums of 2017 by Hobart Taylor on KUCI 88.9FM (US)
- Best Album of 2016 by Nathalie Piolé and Alex Duthil, France Musique
- Best Album of 2016 by Jazzmagazine and CitizenJazz
- Disc of the week, FIP
- TTT, Télérama sortir
- CHOC, Jazzmagazine
- INDISPENSABLE, Jazznews
- ELU, Citizenjazz
- «Oui on aime», Culturejazz
- Sélection Jazz, Libération
- Album Jazz de l’été, Les InRocks

=== In Extremis ===
- Ranked in the Top 5 albums of the NPR Annual Jazz Critics Poll: 2013
- Ranked in the Top 5 albums of 2011 – SundayTimes
- Among the best 10 Jazz albums 2011 of Citizenjazz.com
- "Pick of the week" on Fip show on France Musique June 2011
- TT, Télérama

=== Live au 7 Lézards ===
- ***, Jazzman

== Sources ==
- Notice d’autorité: Bibliothèque Nationale de France – In Extremis
- Notice d’autorité: Bibliothèque Nationale de France – Live au 7 Lézards
- Ressource relative à l'audiovisuel: (en) Internet Movie Database
