= Lupe Pintor =

Mexican boxer (born 1955)

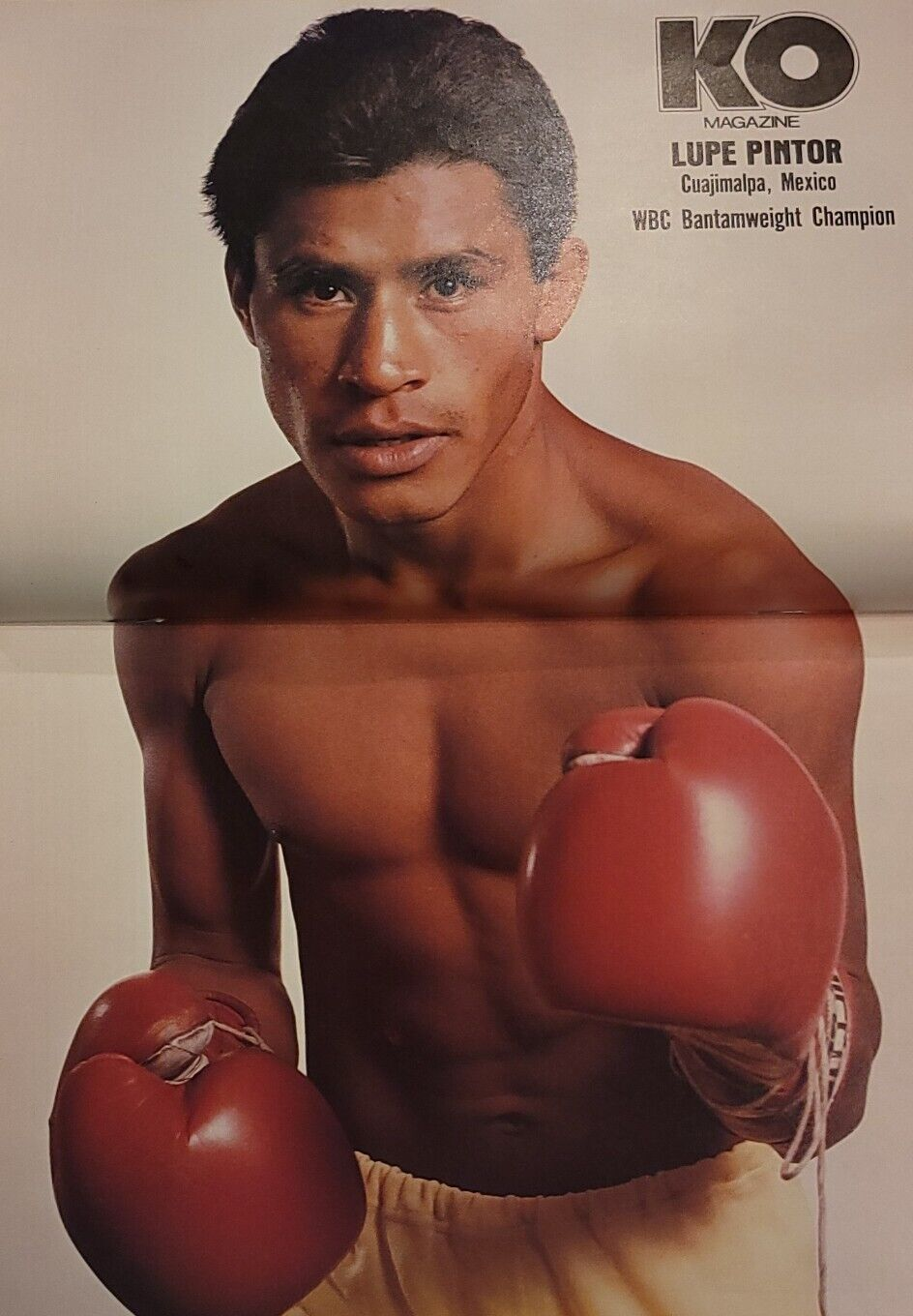
- Pintor c. 1982

Personal information
- Nicknames: El Grillo de Cuajimalpa ("The Cuajimalpa Cricket"); El Indio
- Born: José Guadalupe Pintor Guzmán; April 13, 1955 (age 71) Cuajimalpa, Mexico City, Mexico
- Height: 5 ft 4 1/2 in (164 cm)
- Weight: Bantamweight; Super bantamweight; Lightweight; Light welterweight

Boxing career
- Reach: 66 in (168 cm)
- Stance: Orthodox

Boxing record
- Total fights: 72
- Wins: 56
- Win by KO: 42
- Losses: 14
- Draws: 2

José Guadalupe Pintor Guzmán (born April 13, 1955), better known as Lupe Pintor, is a Mexican former professional boxer who competed from 1974 to 1995. He is a world champion in two weight classes, having held the World Boxing Council (WBC) bantamweight title from 1979 to 1983 and the WBC super bantamweight title from 1985 to 1986.

== Early life and career ==
Lupe Pintor was born into a poor, working-class family in Cuajimalpa, just outside Mexico City in 1955 and is alleged to have had an extremely violent relationship with his father, eventually forcing him to run away. He lived for some time on the city streets and began boxing professionally in 1974.

He opened his account with a second-round knockout of Manuel Vázquez and immediately stepped up to ten round bouts, claiming a decision over Francisco Nunez on his next outing. He suffered his first loss three fights later, when he was disqualified against Magarito Lozano, but claimed victory in his next eight bouts, seven by knockout, including wins over notables Juan Díaz, Rocky Mijares and Willie Jespen.

Pintor first boxed future World Bantamweight Champion Alberto Davila on 25 February 1976, losing a decision over ten rounds, then embarked on a winning streak of some twenty-two fights in a row. Amongst the fighters he beat during this period were Gerald Hayes – who later conquered Juan Laporte – and Antonio Becerra, the only man to get the better of Salvador Sánchez as a professional boxer.

He then travelled to Puerto Rico, where he lost a ten-round decision to Leo Cruz – himself a future world champion. Upon returning to Mexico, Pintor lost for the second time in a row, carelessly dropping a decision to journeyman Jose Luis Soto. Another winning streak, comprising five fights in a row, all by way of knockout and he was ready for a shot at the world title.

== World championships ==
Carlos Zárate, a fellow Mexican boxer, was the reigning champion at the time and is widely regarded as one of the greatest bantamweights in boxing history. Pintor won the boat by a split decision after a closely contested fight in which he was knocked down in the fourth round. The judges' scorecards differed significantly, and the decision has remained controversial.

Pintor was a busy champion and he began his reign by engaging in three non-title bouts, beating Aucencio Melendez by a knockout in the first and avenging his loss to Jose Luis Soto before losing a rematch with Manuel Vázquez by a knockout in six. Then he began to defend his title in earnest, retaining it with a knockout in twelve over Alberto Sandoval in Los Angeles and drawing over fifteen with Eijiro Murata in Tokyo.

His next bout ended tragically. He defended against Johnny Owen of Wales in Los Angeles. Many of the fans present and the authors of The Ring's Boxing in The 20th Century, have agreed that the fight should have been stopped during round ten. But it carried on until the close of the twelfth, when Pintor unleashed a savage right-hand, knocking his opponent out cold. It was then revealed his jaw had dislocated and punctured his skull into the lower brain. Owen never regained consciousness, lapsed into a coma and died seven weeks later. This fight was documented in the film Faces of Death II.

Horrified and depressed, Pintor – encouraged by Owen's family – resumed his career by avenging his loss to Davila, retaining the title by unanimous decision. He went on to retain the belt against Jose Uziga – again by decision – and Jovito Rengifo, by a knockout in eight. He stopped Hurricane Teru in the fifteenth and final round to close 1981 and began 1982, by retaining the title against Seung-Hoon Lee with an eleventh-round knockout.

Soon after the Lee fight, Pintor vacated his world title and started eyeing the WBC Super Bantamweight crown worn by the great Wilfredo Gómez. Stepping up, he immediately beat former WBA World Bantamweight Champion Jorge Luján and then, on 3 December of that year, he and Gómez met as part of the Carnival of Champions in New Orleans. Showcased on HBO, this duel was subsequently dubbed the division's 'Fight of The Decade' by The Ring magazine. But it did not go Pintor's way. Gómez recorded a fourteenth-round knockout and relinquished his own title five months later.

Pintor was inactive throughout 1983. He returned to the ring a year-and-a-half later as a fully-fledged Super Bantamweight defeating Ruben Solorio on 16 February 1984 and busied himself thereafter trying to get another shot at the world title. his perseverance paid off when he was pitted against Juan 'Kid' Meza, the WBC's Super Bantamweight Champion on 18 August 1985. Pintor floored the defending champion three times on the way to collecting a unanimous decision and celebrated his new status as a double world title holder.

His first defense of this new crown did not go to plan. Traveling to Bangkok to meet Samart Payakaroon, Pintor exceeded the division weight limit and was subsequently stripped of his title at the scales. Payakaroon could still become champion if he defeated Pintor but if Pintor won the title would be declared vacant. Payakaroon pounded Pintor to defeat in five rounds and the ex-champion quit fighting for the next eight years.

Pintor made a comeback of sorts in 1994, but at the comparatively advanced age of thirty-eight, he was long past his best. Winning just twice in seven contests over the next eighteen months, he was finally convinced that it was time to retire.

=== Honors ===
Pintor was named The Ring magazine Comeback of the Year fighter for 1985.

== After boxing ==
Pintor opened a boxing school in Mexico City. In 2002, he was invited to Merthyr Tydfil by Johnny Owen's family to help unveil a bronze statue commemorating the boxer's life and career.

In 2008, Pintor reunited with Carlos Zarate and joined Juan Laporte as the three former victims of Wilfredo Gómez showed up at a party dedicated to Gómez for his fiftieth birthday in Puerto Rico.

Pintor, along with Hector Camacho, Hilario Zapata, and several non-boxers, was voted into the International Boxing Hall of Fame in December 2015 and inducted in June 2016.

== Professional boxing record ==
72 fights	56 wins	14 losses
By knockout	42	7
By decision	14	6
By disqualification	0	1
Draws	2	

No.	Result	Record	Opponent	Type	Round, time	Date	Location	Notes
72	Loss	56–14–2	Russell Mosley	KO	2 (10)	Jul 21, 1995	Tijuana, Mexico	
71	Loss	56–13–2	Rodrigo Cerda	PTS	10	Dec 2, 1994	Houston, Texas, US	
70	Win	56–12–2	Kevin Sedam	TKO	1 (10), 2:56	Nov 18, 1994	International Amphitheatre, Chicago, Illinois, US	
69	Loss	55–12–2	Leonardo Mas	RTD	8 (12)	Aug 13, 1994	Jai Alai Fronton, Miami, Florida, US	For WBC FECARBOX super lightweight title
68	Loss	55–11–2	Fernando Caicedo	UD	12	Apr 2, 1994	Jai Alai Fronton, Miami, Florida, US	For WBC FECARBOX lightweight title
67	Loss	55–10–2	Ramon Sanchez	PTS	10	Feb 25, 1994	Mexico	
66	Win	55–9–2	Carmelo Gomez	PTS	10	Jan 14, 1994	Tijuana, Mexico	
65	Loss	54–9–2	Samart Payakaroon	KO	5 (12), 1:31	Jan 18, 1986	Hua Mark Indoor Stadium, Bangkok, Thailand	WBC super bantamweight title at stake only for Payakaroon, Pintor missed weight
64	Loss	54–8–2	Billy White	TKO	10 (?)	Dec 12, 1985	Sam Houston Coliseum, Houston, Texas, US	
63	Win	54–7–2	Juan Meza	UD	12	Aug 18, 1985	Palacio de los Deportes, Mexico City, Mexico	Won WBC super bantamweight title
62	Draw	53–7–2	Javier Marquez	SD	10	Jun 10, 1985	Auditorio del Estado, Mexicali, Mexico	
61	Win	53–7–1	Eugenio Morgan	TKO	2 (10), 2:37	Apr 19, 1985	Forum, Inglewood, California, US	
60	Loss	52–7–1	Adriano Arreola	TKO	7 (10), 3:00	Jan 17, 1985	Olympic Auditorium, Los Angeles, California, US	
59	Win	52–6–1	Ronnie Gary	TKO	6 (10), 0:47	Jan 1, 1985	Toreo de Cuatro Caminos, Mexico City, Mexico	
58	Win	51–6–1	Cleo Garcia	KO	1 (10), 3:00	Apr 26, 1984	Olympic Auditorium, Los Angeles, California, US	
57	Win	50–6–1	Ruben Solorio	UD	10	Feb 16, 1984	Olympic Auditorium, Los Angeles, California, US	
56	Loss	49–6–1	Wilfredo Gómez	TKO	14 (15), 2:44	Dec 3, 1982	Superdome, New Orleans, Louisiana, US	For WBC and The Ring super bantamweight titles
55	Win	49–5–1	Jorge Luján	UD	10	Sep 23, 1982	Olympic Auditorium, Los Angeles, California, US	
54	Win	48–5–1	Lee Seung-hoon	TKO	11 (15), 0:43	Jun 3, 1982	Olympic Auditorium, Los Angeles, California, US	Retained WBC bantamweight title
53	Win	47–5–1	Hurricane Teru	KO	15 (15), 2:02	Sep 22, 1981	Aichi Prefectural Gymnasium, Nagoya, Japan	Retained WBC bantamweight title
52	Win	46–5–1	Jovito Rengifo	TKO	8 (15), 1:21	Jul 26, 1981	Showboat Hotel and Casino, Las Vegas, Nevada, US	Retained WBC bantamweight title
51	Win	45–5–1	Jose Felix Uziga	UD	15	Feb 22, 1981	Sam Houston Coliseum, Houston, Texas, US	Retained WBC bantamweight title
50	Win	44–5–1	Alberto Dávila	MD	15	Dec 19, 1980	Caesars Palace, Sports Pavilion, Paradise, Nevada, US	Retained WBC bantamweight title
49	Win	43–5–1	Johnny Owen	KO	12 (15), 2:35	Sep 19, 1980	Olympic Auditorium, Los Angeles, California, US	Retained WBC bantamweight title; Owen died of injuries sustained from the fight.
48	Draw	42–5–1	Eijiro Murata	SD	15	Jun 11, 1980	Nippon Budokan, Tokyo, Japan	Retained WBC bantamweight title
47	Win	42–5	Alberto Sandoval	TKO	12 (15)	Feb 9, 1980	Olympic Auditorium, Los Angeles, California, US	Retained WBC bantamweight title
46	Loss	41–5	Manuel Vazquez	RTD	5 (10), 3:00	Dec 29, 1979	Gimnasio del Estado, Hermosillo, Mexico	
45	Win	41–4	Jose Luis Soto	PTS	10	Oct 29, 1979	Ciudad Obregón, Mexico	
44	Win	40–4	Torito Melendez	KO	1 (?)	Oct 5, 1979	Reynosa, Mexico	
43	Win	39–4	Carlos Zárate Serna	SD	15	Jun 3, 1979	Caesars Palace, Sports Pavilion, Paradise, Nevada, US	Won WBC bantamweight title
42	Win	38–4	Rodrigo Gonzalez	TKO	3 (10), 2:42	May 1, 1979	Sam Houston Coliseum, Houston, Texas, US	
41	Win	37–4	Livio Nolasco	TKO	6 (10), 2:16	Mar 10, 1979	Forum, Inglewood, California, US	
40	Win	36–4	Agustin Vega	KO	3 (?)	Nov 11, 1978	Matamoros, Mexico	
39	Win	35–4	Roger Buchelli	KO	2 (10), 2:59	Sep 26, 1978	Houston, Texas, US	
38	Win	34–4	Richard Rozelle	KO	5 (10), 0:10	Jul 18, 1978	Civic Center, Houston, Texas, US	
37	Loss	33–4	Jose Luis Soto	PTS	10	Jun 30, 1978	Culiacán, Mexico	
36	Loss	33–3	Leonardo Cruz	PTS	10	Apr 22, 1978	Coliseo Roberto Clemente, San Juan, Puerto Rico	
35	Win	33–2	Antonio Becerra	PTS	10	Mar 31, 1978	Mazatlán, Mexico	
34	Win	32–2	Gerald Hayes	UD	10	Feb 25, 1978	Forum, Inglewood, California, US	
33	Win	31–2	Davey Vasquez	KO	2 (10), 2:05	Jan 30, 1978	Municipal Auditorium, San Antonio, Texas, US	
32	Win	30–2	Joaquin Gonzalez	KO	2 (10)	Dec 18, 1977	Auditorio Matamoros, Matamoros, Mexico	
31	Win	29–2	Baby Kid Chocolate	KO	2 (10), 2:58	Nov 8, 1977	Municipal Auditorium, San Antonio, Texas, US	
30	Win	28–2	Tony Rocha	KO	4 (10), 0:33	Oct 8, 1977	Forum, Inglewood, California, US	
29	Win	27–2	Andres Torres	TKO	4 (10), 0:59	Aug 20, 1977	Forum, Inglewood, California, US	
28	Win	26–2	Ramon Guillen	KO	1 (?)	Jul 2, 1977	Mexico City, Mexico	
27	Win	25–2	Eduardo Limon	KO	1 (?)	Jun 17, 1977	Reynosa, Mexico	
26	Win	24–2	Tranquita Brown	KO	1 (?)	May 20, 1977	Ciudad Madera, Mexico	
25	Win	23–2	Gabby Cantera	KO	7 (?), 2:41	Apr 12, 1977	Municipal Auditorium, San Antonio, Texas, US	
24	Win	22–2	Orlando Amores	KO	1 (?)	Mar 11, 1977	Culiacán, Mexico	
23	Win	21–2	Evaristo Perez	KO	1 (?)	Feb 26, 1977	Mexico City, Mexico	
22	Win	20–2	Babe San Martin	TKO	7 (10)	Jan 29, 1977	Reynosa, Mexico	
21	Win	19–2	Jose Angel Cazares	KO	1 (10)	Jan 1, 1977	Plaza de Toros, Torreón, Mexico	
20	Win	18–2	Nacho Beltran	KO	3 (?)	Nov 13, 1976	Estadio General Ángel Flores, Culiacán, Mexico	
19	Win	17–2	Jose Antonio Rosa	TKO	6 (10), 1:23	Oct 2, 1976	Sports Arena, Los Angeles, California, US	
18	Win	16–2	Samuel Machorro	PTS	10	Aug 1, 1976	Arena Coliseo, Mexico City, Mexico	
17	Win	15–2	Manuel Killer	KO	2 (10)	Jun 26, 1976	Plaza de Toros Calafia, Mexicali, Mexico	
16	Win	14–2	Gallito Castro	KO	1 (?)	Jun 2, 1976	Tijuana, Mexico	
15	Win	13–2	Jose Luis Cruz	TKO	9 (10)	Mar 27, 1976	Plaza de Toros Monumental, Monterrey, Mexico	
14	Loss	12–2	Alberto Dávila	UD	10	Feb 25, 1976	Forum, Inglewood, California, US	
13	Win	12–1	Catalino Flores	KO	2 (10), 1:27	Dec 4, 1975	Forum, Inglewood, California, US	
12	Win	11–1	Alvaro Lopez	KO	2 (10)	Oct 11, 1975	Auditorio Benito Juárez, Guadalajara, Mexico	
11	Win	10–1	Willie Jensen	KO	7 (10), 0:58	Sep 20, 1975	Forum, Inglewood, California, US	
10	Win	9–1	Roberto Alvarez	KO	1 (10)	Jul 25, 1975	Arena Coliseo, Guadalajara, Mexico	
9	Win	8–1	Rocky Mijares	TKO	6 (10)	Apr 16, 1975	Plaza de Toros, Torreón, Mexico	
8	Win	7–1	Andres Reyes	PTS	10	Mar 10, 1975	Victoria de Durango, Mexico	
7	Win	6–1	Martin Valencia	KO	6 (?)	Feb 19, 1975	Mexico City, Mexico	
6	Win	5–1	Juan Diaz	KO	2 (10)	Dec 21, 1974	Arena Coliseo, Mexico City, Mexico	
5	Loss	4–1	Magallo Lozada	DQ	4 (?)	Oct 16, 1974	Mexico City, Mexico	
4	Win	4–0	Salvador Martinez	PTS	10	Sep 10, 1974	Mexico City, Mexico	
3	Win	3–0	Manuel Castanedas	TKO	4 (?)	Jul 24, 1974	Tijuana, Mexico	
2	Win	2–0	Francisco Javier Nunez	UD	10	May 7, 1974	Arena Tijuana 72, Tijuana, Mexico	
1	Win	1–0	Manuel Vazquez	KO	2 (10)	Mar 26, 1974	Arena Tijuana 72, Tijuana, Mexico	

== Titles in boxing ==
=== Major world titles ===
- WBC bantamweight champion (118 lbs)
- WBC super bantamweight champion (122 lbs)

== See also ==
- List of WBC world champions
- List of Mexican boxing world champions

== Sources ==
(i) There are few online accounts of Pintor's upbringing. A sensitive description may however, be located here: . (ii) For an in-depth discussion of Pintor's controversial defeat of Carlos Zarate, see: . (iii) A ring report describing the Owen fight can be found here: . (iv) For more on Pintor's relationship with Johnny Owen's family, see: . (v) For a piece on Pintor's return fight with Albert Davila, go to Boxing Insider . (vi) Details of Pintor's ring record can be found at the Boxing Records Archive: .

Sporting positions
World boxing titles
Preceded by Carlos Zarate	WBC bantamweight champion June 3, 1979 – July 9, 1983; Stripped	Vacant Title next held by Alberto Davila
Preceded by Juan Meza	WBC super bantamweight champion August 18, 1985 – January 18, 1986	Succeeded by Samart Payakaroon
