= Clotilde (fl. 673) =

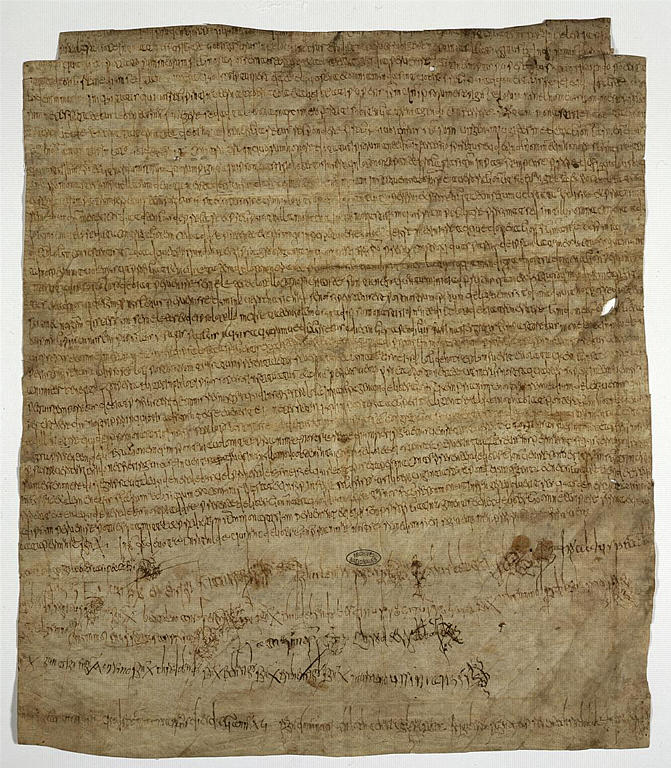
The charter of Clotilde founding the abbey of Bruyères-le-Châtel dated 10 March 673.

Clotilde or Chlodechilidis (fl. 673) was the founder of the abbey of Bruyères-le-Châtel. Her charter is one of only eight known original manuscripts to survive from 7th century Francia, among which it is the only private charter. It is a parchment, which is unusual in that most surviving Merovingian documents of the 7th century were written on papyrus. As a result, it has been the object of detailed analysis over many years.

Clotilde, notes Levillain, was evidently a very important woman. It is supposed that she was in some way related to the Merovingian kings, but the exact relation is uncertain. Her name and its variants, male and female, are common ones among the Merovingians, perhaps due to the memory of Clotilde wife of Clovis I. Clovis and Clotilde had a daughter of the same name. This Clotilde was unhappily married to the Visigothic king Amalric. King Guntram had a daughter named Clotilde, and Clotilde the Proud, daughter of King Charibert I, was a famously disobedient nun whose story is recounted by Gregory of Tours. Clotilde's charter also suggests a link to the Merovingians as it requires the nuns to pray for the stability of the kingdom and success for the king, a requirement found elsewhere only in royal charters.

From the terms, derived from Roman law, which Clotilde uses to describe the lands she is granting to the nunnery, it appears that these had belonged to her son who had died without heirs. The term Deo devota used to describe her is read as meaning that Clotilde herself will become a nun in her new foundation. The vir inluster Charicard who is to have a life interest in Fontenay-lès-Briis is presumed to be Clotilde's husband for the legal terms used suggest that she was not a widow.

The charter was first published in 1681 by Jean Mabillon in his De Re diplomatica. As the document long predates the general adoption of Anno Domini dating, there was initially a dispute over whether it belonged to the reign of King Chlothar II or King Chlothar III. Modern historians confidently date it to the sixteenth year of the reign of Chlothar III, from which the Anno Domini date of 673 is deduced. This dating had cast doubt on the authenticity of the charter as the reign of Chlothar III was presumed to have been only fifteen years prior to the 19th century.

The content of the charter is simple. Clotilde grants a number of properties to the Virgin Mary and to the nunnery which she is founding. The nunnery is to be led by her niece Mummola. Half of an additional estate at Fontenay-lès-Briis is promised to the monastery after Clotilde and Charicard have both died. Clotilde sets out the rule that the nuns shall follow, based on that of Luxeuil, and how Mummola's successors shall be elected. She includes a curse, calling down the wrath of the Holy Trinity on any who oppose the provisions of her charter.

The charter was issued at Lamorlaye, a Merovingian palace north of Paris. The date and location suggest that Clotilde chose to have the charter witnessed on an occasion when important persons were at Lamorlaye for other reasons, perhaps the annual muster and review of warriors, rather than having convoked the meeting herself.

Ecclesiastical witnesses include the bishop of Paris Agilbert, abbot Chrodecar, a lawyer named Rigobert. One Ermenric, who signs immediately after Agilbert, and is thus the chief layman present, is tentatively identified with the man of the same name who had been intendant of the royal domain under Clovis II. Two counts who witness, Vaning and Robert, had been close allies of the mayor of the palace Ebroin. The following witness is named Ghislemar, probably the son of Waratton, another mayor of the palace.

== See more ==
- Riché, Pierre (1996), "Clotilde", Dictionnaire des Francs, vol. 1: Les temps Mérovingiennes, Paris: Bartillat, p. 106, ISBN 2-84100-008-7
- Levillain, Léon (1944), "Études mérovingiennes : la charte de Clotilde (10 mars 673)", Bibliothèque de l'école des chartes, 105: 5–63, doi:10.3406/bec.1944.449321, ISSN 0373-6237
