= Bruyères-le-Châtel =

Commune in Île-de-France, France

- Commune
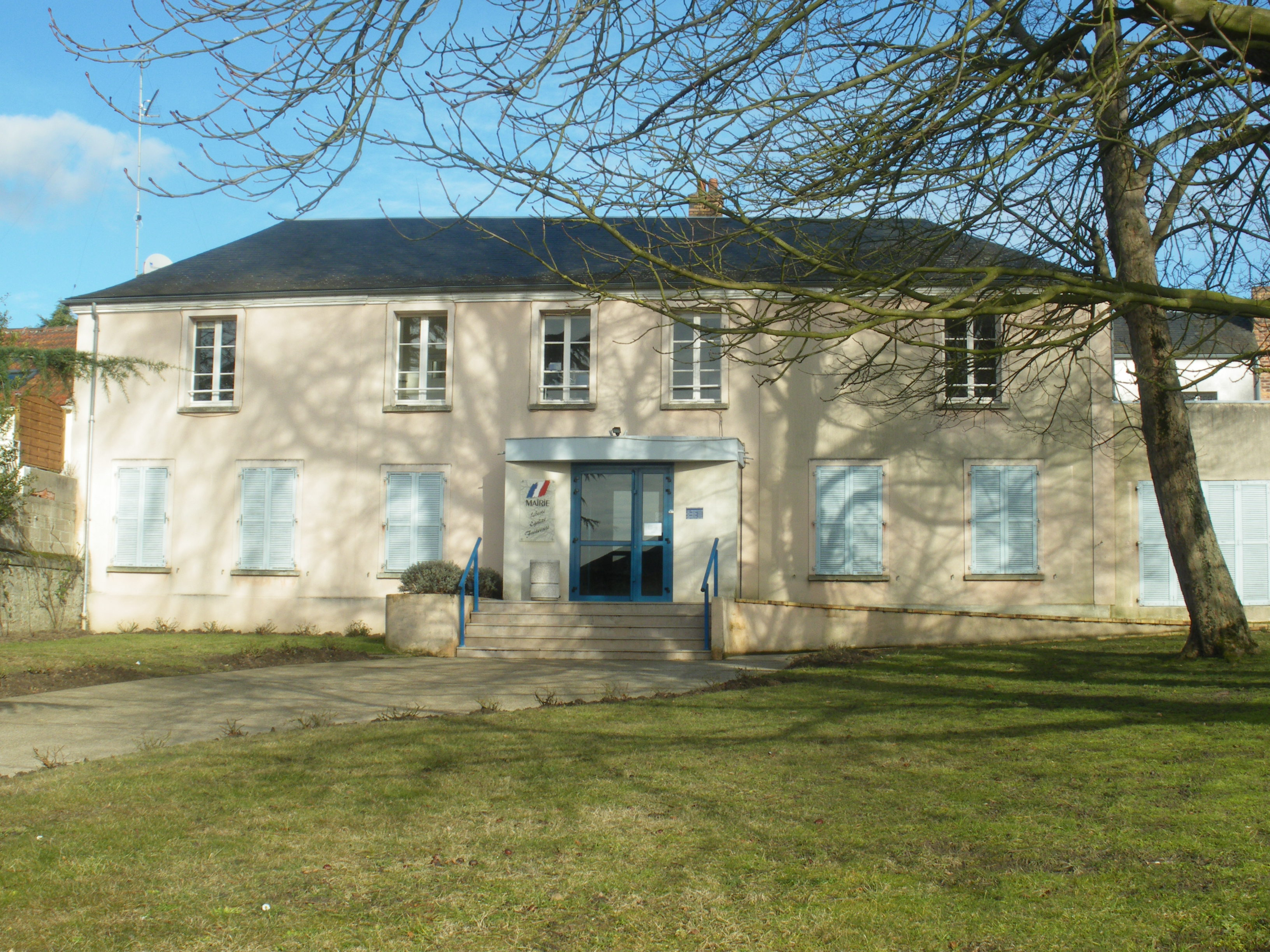
- The town hall of Bruyères

- Coat of arms
- Location of Bruyères-le-Châtel
- Location within France Location within Île-de-France (region)
- Coordinates: 48°35′37″N 2°11′33″E
- Country: France
- Region: Île-de-France
- Department: Essonne
- Arrondissement: Palaiseau
- Canton: Arpajon
- Intercommunality: CA Cœur d'Essonne

Government
  - Mayor (2020–2026): Thierry Rouyer
- Area^{1}: 12.90 km^{2} (4.98 sq mi)
- Highest elevation: 168 m (551 ft)
- Lowest elevation: 48 m (157 ft)
- Population (2023): 3,788
  - Density: 293.6/km^{2} (760.5/sq mi)
- Time zone: UTC+01:00 (CET)
  - Summer (DST): UTC+02:00 (CEST)
- INSEE/Postal code: 91115 /91680
- ^{1} French Land Register data, which excludes lakes, ponds, glaciers > 1 km^{2} (0.386 sq mi or 247 acres) and river estuaries.

Bruyères-le-Châtel (French pronunciation: [bʁɥijɛʁ lǝ ʃɑtɛl]) is a commune in the Essonne department in Île-de-France in northern France.

== History ==
A nunnery was founded at Bruyères-le-Châtel by a noblewoman named Clotilde. The charter endowing the monastery is dated to 10 March 673 and is among the oldest original private charters which survive from Merovingian Francia.

In February 2025, it was announced that the French firm Eclairion would be opening a data center in the commune, occupying an area of 4 hectares (9.9 acres), with up to 60 megawatts of capacity. One company that would be taking advantage of this data center would be Mistral AI. In March 2026, Mistral AI raised $830 million in debt financing to purchase 13,800 Nvidia GB300 GPUs for the data center. On 22 May 2026, Emmanuel Macron, the President of France, gave a speech at the Bruyères-le-Châtel data center in which he called for an EU equivalent of Section 301 of the Trade Act of 1974 in the United States.

== Population ==
Historical population
| Year | Pop. | ±% p.a. |
|---|---|---|
| 1968 | 1,521 | — |
| 1975 | 2,103 | +4.74% |
| 1982 | 2,199 | +0.64% |
| 1990 | 2,536 | +1.80% |
| 1999 | 3,013 | +1.93% |
| 2007 | 3,077 | +0.26% |
| 2012 | 3,513 | +2.69% |
| 2017 | 3,302 | −1.23% |
| 2023 | 3,788 | +2.31% |
Source: INSEE

Inhabitants of Bruyères-le-Châtel are known as Bruyérois in French.

== See also ==
- Communes of the Essonne department
