= Clotilde de Surville =

Supposed author of the Poésies de Clotilde

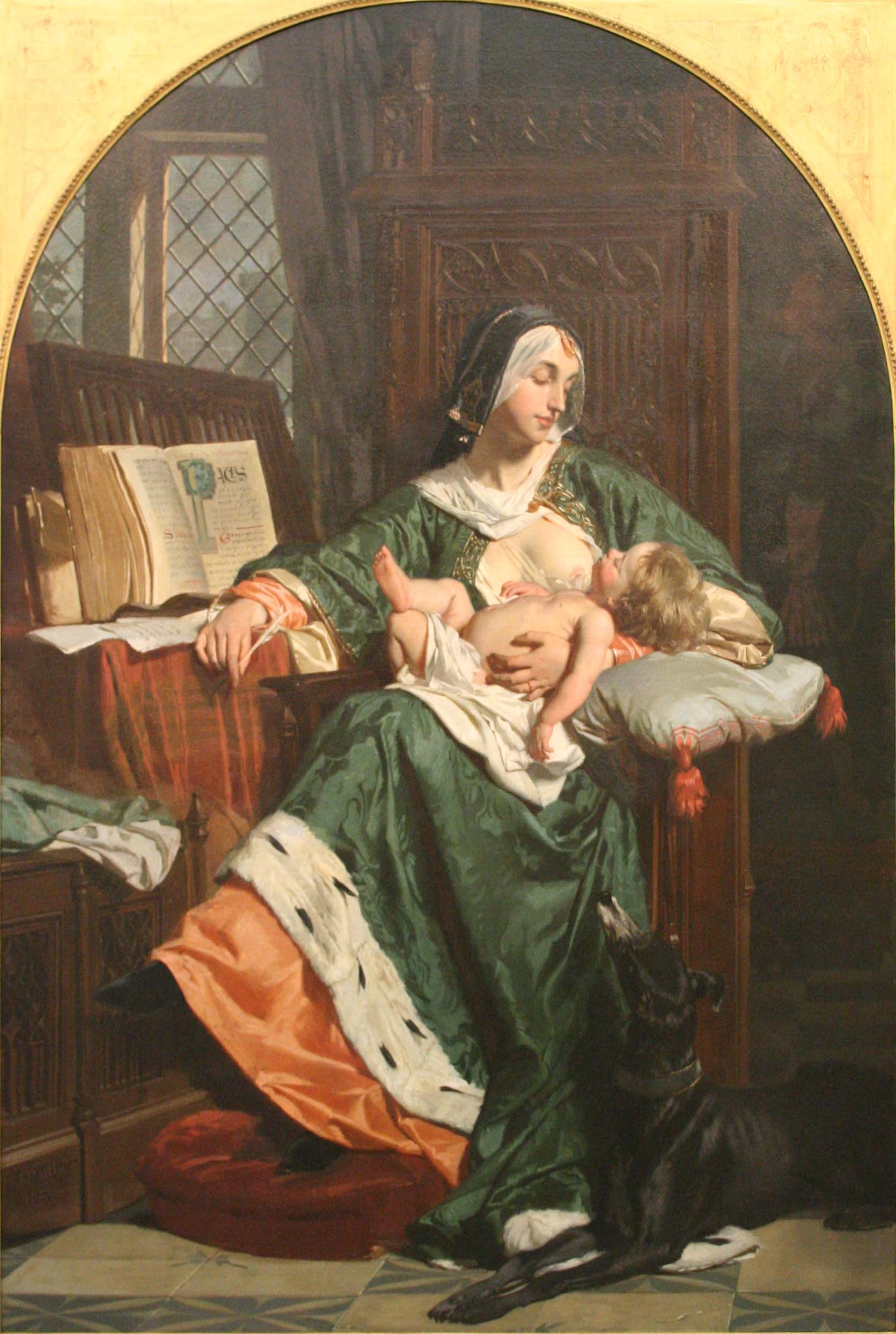
1853 painting of Clotilde de Surville by Eugène Ernest Hillemacher

"Clotilde de Surville"(c. 1405 – 1498) was the supposed author of the Poésies de Clotilde. The generally accepted legend gave the following account of her:

== Life ==
Marguerite-Éléonore Clotilde de Vallon-Chalys, dame de Surville, was born in the noble family of Vallon Chalys in the early years of the 15th century. She was educated in the court of Gaston Phebus, Count of Foix, where she gave an early proof of literary and poetical talent. Her mother, Pulcherie de Fay Collon, lived in the court of the Count de Foix, and took the advantage of his library to broaden her mind by reading the works of French and Italian poets. She brought up the young Clotilde with the same literary tastes. Clotilde was “a precocious genius, and composed verses at the age of twelve.” In 1421 she married Berenger de Surville, "who quitted her early to fight under the command of the Dauphin, afterwards Charles VII." He was killed at the Siege of Orléans in 1428. Her husband's absence at the war inspired her heroic verses and his death her elegiac poems. The last of her poems is a chant royal addressed to Charles VIII.

In 1803 Charles Vanderbourg published as the Poésies de Clotilde some forty poems dealing with love and war. The history given in the introduction of the discovery of the manuscript was evidently a fable, and the poems were set down by most authorities as forgeries, especially as they contained many anachronisms and were written in accordance with modern laws of prosody. The manuscript had been in the possession of Jean François Marie, marquis de Surville, an Émigré who returned to France in 1798 to raise an insurrection in Provence, and had paid the penalty with his life.

In 1863 Antonin Mace made further inquiries on the subject and discovered letters from Vanderbourg to Surville's widow. This correspondence makes it clear that Vanderbourg was innocent of forgery and believed that the poems were of 15th century date, and that the anachronisms of matter and form were due to retouching by Surville. But the researches of Mace interested local antiquarians, and documentary evidence was produced that the wife of Berenger de Surville was Marguerite Chalis, not Clotilde, and that the marriage dated only from 1428. Moreover, Berenger, whose death at the siege of Orléans was one of the leading motives of the book, lived for twenty years after that date. Friends of M. de Surville also disclosed the fact that the marquis had contributed archaic poetry to a Lausanne journal.

== Sources ==
- A Mace, Un process d'histoire littéraire (1870)
- A Mazon, Marguerite Chalis et la legende de Clotilde de Surville (1875)
- articles by Gaston Paris in the Revue critique d'histoire et de littérature (March 1, 1873 and May 30, 1874), by Paul Cottin in the Bulletin du bibliophile (1894)
- EK Chambers, Literary Forgeries (1891)
- further references in the Bibliographie des femmes célébres (Turin and Paris, 1892, etc.).
