= La Clotilde, Chaco =

Coordinates: 27°08′S 60°40′W

La Clotilde (Chaco)
- Municipality and village
- Interactive map of La Clotilde (Chaco)
- Country: Argentina
- Province: Chaco Province
- Time zone: UTC−3 (ART)

La Clotilde is a village and municipality in Chaco Province in northern Argentina.
