= Frankie Duarte =

American boxer (1954–2026)

- Born: September 3, 1954; Santa Monica, California, U.S.
- Died: May 25, 2026 (aged 71); Culver City, California, U.S.
- Years active: 1973–1989

Frank Joseph Duarte (September 3, 1954 – May 25, 2026) was an American super bantamweight professional boxer.

== Professional career ==
Duarte turned pro in 1973 and retired in 1989 after losing to Daniel Zaragoza in a WBC super bantamweight title challenge. He finished his career with a record of 47–8–1.

== Death ==
Duarte died from a brain tumor on May 25, 2026, at the age of 71.

== Sources ==
- Boxing record for Frankie Duarte from BoxRec (registration required)
