= Boxing in Puerto Rico =

The history of the sport of boxing in Puerto Rico is a varied and extensive one. Boxing is a major sport in the Caribbean country, and the sport has produced many champions for the island, both in the amateur and professional ranks, and among men and women fighters.

Prestigious boxing publication Ring Magazine has considered Puerto Rico as, pound per pound, the best boxing nation in the world.

As of 2026, 12 Puerto Ricans were inducted into the International Boxing Hall of Fame in Canastota, New York, all of them men. Of these, 11 were former boxers, with one being a former referee and one a writer. In December 2023, Ivan Calderon became the 14th Puerto Rican to be elected to the International Boxing Hall of Fame; he was inducted in June 2024.

Boxing in Puerto Rico is overseen by the Puerto Rican Boxing Commission, whose president in 2021 was Jorge Colón Colón.

Throughout the history of boxing, Puerto Rico has been locked in a rivalry with Mexico, which intensified beginning in the 1970s. Both nations have two of the most important boxing schools, whose boxers have starred in numerous non-heavyweight title fights.

== Beginning of boxing in Puerto Rico ==
Like other sports, such as baseball and basketball, boxing was first introduced to Puerto Rico by the U.S. Military at places such as Camp Las Casas (now Residencial Las Casas) in San Juan. Nero Chen, who died from tuberculosis in 1924, was the first Puerto Rican to register as a professional boxer. He traveled to New York City for fights.

Broadcasts of Jack Dempsey fights to the island by radio brought interest in boxing to Puerto Rican sports fans. Boxing in Puerto Rico was first legalized by governor Horace Mann Towner in 1927. Governor Mann Towner, an American, signed into law in May of that year a proposal that had been first carried by Puerto Rican legislator, don Lorenzo Coballes Gandía, who suggested to him that the sport be legalized in the island. Subsequently, the "Primera Comisíon Atletica de Boxeo" ("First Boxing Athletic Commission") was formed to oversee rules and regulations of the sport in the island, and the "Estadio Universal" ("Universal Stadium") opened in San Juan as the first venue to offer regular boxing shows, with the first fight there being between the then future Venezuelan national Bantamweight champion, Enrique Chaffardet, and an opponent named Al Clemens. That contest was declared a draw or tie by the scoring judges. Soon after, stadiums were also built around the island, many of which had regular boxing shows to attract spectators.

== Sixto Escobar era ==
Sixto Escobar was a Puerto Rican professional boxer. He debuted as a professional on Thursday, July 17, 1930, at the Victory Garden Stadium in San Juan, knocking out Luis Emilio Perez in two rounds as part of a show headlined by a bout between José Quelin Angulo and Octavio Almonte (a fight which Angulo won by second-round knockout).

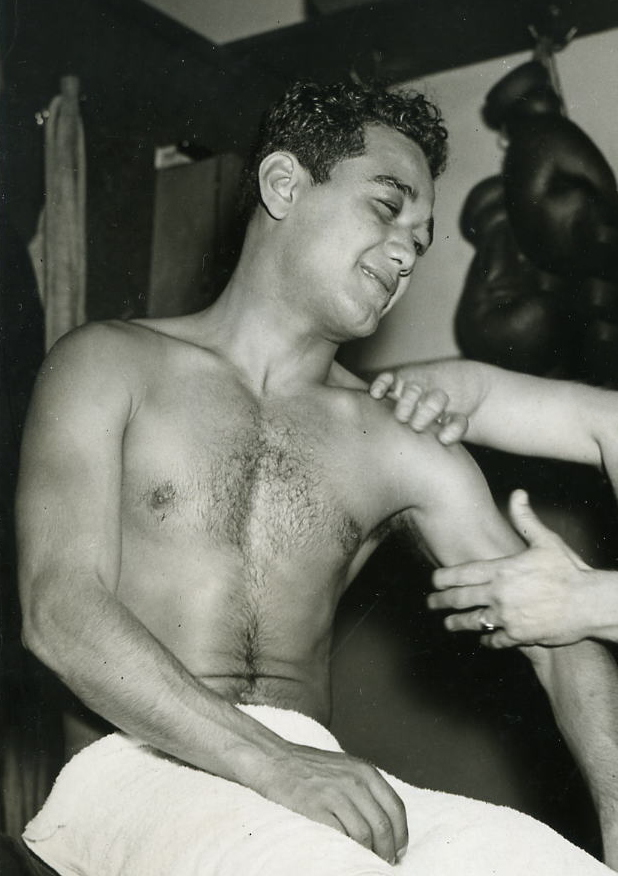
Sixto Escobar

Escobar began getting international attention and moved to Venezuela, where he lost to Chaffardet in an attempt to lift that country's national Bantamweight title.

On June 26, 1934, in Montreal, Quebec, Canada, Escobar beat Mexican boxer Rodolfo Casanova to win the vacant world Bantamweight title, recognized by the Montreal Athletic Commission, thus becoming the first boxer from Puerto Rico to achieve recognition as a world champion and, unbeknown-sly at the time, ushering in the Mexico - Puerto Rico boxing rivalry. Escobar beat Tony Marino by thirteenth-round knockout at the Dyckman Oval in Manhattan, New York, to gain universal recognition as a unified Bantamweight world champion.

Escobar went on to become a national hero in Puerto Rico and lost and recovered the Bantamweight title twice afterwards.

=== Cocoa Kid ===
Concurrently with Escobar's world titles run, Herbert "Cocoa Kid" Hardwick, a Black Puerto Rican from Mayaguez, became the "Colored Welterweight Champion" when he knocked out Young Peter Jackson in round two of a fight held at Heinemann Park in New Orleans, Louisiana on Saturday, July 26, 1936, in a fight refereed by the legendary former Heavyweight contender and also International Boxing Hall of Fame member, Harry Wills. Hardwick defended the title successfully against Holman Williams on June 11, 1937, at the Coliseum Arena in New Orleans by winning a 15-rounds unanimous decision. He defended the title successfully once more before losing it to Charley Burley, losing a fifteen-rounds unanimous decision to Burley on Monday, August 22, 1938, at the Hickey Park in Millvale, Pennsylvania. Cocoa Kid, Burley and Williams were each members of a group of Black boxers who were dubbed as the Murderer's Row, who were known both for their ability as well as for their inability to secure fights for world titles held by other boxers not in that group. Hardwick, Burley and Williams were all later elected to the IBHOF.

Despite the considerable talent of the title's holders, in modern times, the Colored Welterweight Championship is generally not considered as a world title by most boxing fans and historians alike.

=== Pedro Montanez ===
Pedro Montanez, from the central Puerto Rico city of Cayey, was another outstanding Black Puerto Rican boxer of the time. Unlike Hardwick, however, he was not a member of boxing's murderer's row, and he was allowed to compete for regular world titles. Montanez debuted on Sunday, February 1, 1931, at the Victory Garden in San Juan by beating the undefeated Antonio Melendez by six-rounds decision as part of a program headlined by a young Escobar himself.

Montanez's victory over Felix Perez on Wednesday, March 7, 1934, at the Salón Nuevo Mundo in Barcelona, Spain, a seventh-round knockout win, set off a streak of 50 consecutive fights in which he did not lose; he went 49–0–1 during that streak, the lone tie being against Saverio Turiello of Italy over ten rounds at Milan's Teatro Puccini on Monday, April 15, 1935. Among others, during that streak, he beat Bobby Pacho, Aldo Spoldi, Frankie Klick, Enrico Venturi, Lou Ambers, Wesley Ramey and Freddie Cochrane.

That undefeated streak came to an end when Montanez challenged Ambers for the world Lightweight title as part of a program that included three other world title fights (Marcel Thil vs. Fred Apostoli, Sixto Escobar vs. Harry Jeffra and Barney Ross vs. Ceferino Garcia) on Thursday, September 23, 1937, at the Polo Grounds in New York City. In a close match, Ambers was able to edge the Puerto Rican by a fifteen-rounds majority decision to retain the world championship. The New York Times agreed with the decision, but in Puerto Rico at least, Montanez was called an "uncrowned champion".

Montanez went on about keeping his status as a contender and hoping to become Puerto Rico's second world boxing champion; he then embarked on another undefeated streak after the title-fight loss to Ambers, this time reaching 22 bouts without a loss, with only one tie among the wins he got during that sequence. He defeated, among others, Jimmy Garrison, International Boxing Hall of Fame member and former world Junior Welterweight champion Jack Kid Berg (a fifth-round knockout win for Montanez on Friday, March 10, 1939, at the New York Hippodrome) and Young Peter Jackson at the Olympic Auditorium in Los Angeles, California on Tuesday, April 25 of the same year.

That latter streak also came to an end, but this time it was in a controversial way: boxing against Davey Day on Thursday, May 23, 1939, at the Madison Square Garden in New York, Montanez was even on the scorecards when the fight was stopped in round eight in favor of Day, therefore Montanez took an eighth-round technical knockout defeat. The stoppage was due to a cut Montanez suffered on one of his eyes. The New York Times claimed that Day was "clearly beaten" and that the crowd "jeer(ed) thunderously". But the Chicago Tribune disagreed with that stance, publishing that "Day's victory was a popular one" and that most ringsiders felt the fight was tied before the stoppage, and the Hartford Courant expressed their opinion that the fight was tied when it ended.

Montanez nevertheless kept his march towards a second world title fight. He won three more fights, then faced the immortal, International Boxing Hall of Fame member, three-division world champion Henry Armstrong for Armstrong's world Welterweight title on Wednesday, January 24, 1940, at the Madison Square Garden in New York, at a show promoted by Mike Jacobs. Armstrong had won 103 of 122 previous fights, and that night, proved to be the best of the two future International Boxing Hall of Fame inductees, knocking out the Puerto Rican star in round nine to retain the belt. Montanez had one more contest and then he retired with 90 wins, 9 losses and 4 ties to his ledger, becoming a popular figure in Puerto Rico and specially in Cayey, where his nickname, "El Torito" ("The Bull") was adopted by the town as the city's secondary demonym and several sports teams are now named after him.

== 1960s and 1970s ==
Carlos Ortiz from Ponce, Puerto Rico, moved to New York City at an early age and later established himself as a professional boxing prospect in the Junior Welterweight division. He became Puerto Rico's second world champion by knocking out Kenny Lane in two rounds to win the vacant Junior Welterweight world title on June 12, 1959, at New York. He defended that title twice, but after losing it to someone he had beaten previously in a title defense, Duilio Loi in a rematch, and failing to recapture it in a third fight with Loi, Ortiz moved down to the Lightweight division and won that title by beating Joe Brown on points on April 21, 1962, in Las Vegas, Nevada. Being that the era of major boxing title fights in Las Vegas was just beginning, Brown-Ortiz was one of the first major fights to take place at the Southwest American desert's city. Ortiz lasted as Lightweight champion until 1968; including losing the title and regaining it against Panamanian Ismael Laguna. Ortiz, like Escobar before him, inspired a large number of Puerto Rican youngsters to take up boxing as a sport.

José Torres followed Ortiz as the third Puerto Rican to win a world title, when he knocked out Willie Pastrano in nine rounds on Tuesday, March 30, 1965, at the Madison Square Garden in New York city to win the undisputed world Light-Heavyweight championship. In doing so, he also became both the first Hispanic world Light-Heavyweight champion and the first Afro-Puerto Rican to win a world boxing championship.

The 1970s are generally considered the beginning of the golden era of boxing in Puerto Rico, an era that lasted until almost the 1990s, due to a number of factors. On December 31, 1972, Puerto Rico's largest sports hero up until that time, baseball player Roberto Clemente, died in a plane crash, leaving the island in need of a new sporting hero. In January 1973, Roberto Clemente Coliseum was opened; it was named after him. The first main event bout to be held at that coliseum was a February 15, 1973, world championship fight, when the WBA's world Junior Welterweight champion, Colombian Antonio Cervantes, faced Puerto Rican challenger Josue Marquez, the Colombian retaining the title by a fifteen-rounds unanimous decision despite having a brief scare in round three when he was floored but the fall was not counted as a knockdown against him. The coliseum has hosted, as of early September 2023, 104 professional boxing shows, many of them featuring world title and other important fights including the likes of Muhammad Ali (against Belgian Jean Pierre Coopman), Panamanian Roberto Duran (against Mexican Leoncio Ortiz), Wilfredo Gomez, Wilfred Benitez, Hector Camacho, Alfredo Escalera, George Foreman, Mexican Carlos Zarate the also Panamanian Eusebio Pedroza and others. Gomez and Zarate fought their bout there on October 28, 1978, (Gomez retained his WBC world Super-Bantamweight title by a fifth-round knockout in a fight that is considered pivotal in the Puerto Rico-Mexico boxing rivalry) and the also Mexican Julio Cesar Chavez fought one of his pre-world champion days fights there, beating Javier Fragoso on May 1, 1983, as part of the undercard of a program whose main event was a contest between Edwin Rosario of Puerto Rico and Chavez's stablemate and countryman, Jose Luis Ramirez, which Rosario won by unanimous decision in twelve rounds to lift the WBCs vacant world Lightweight title.

Meanwhile, the Hiram Bithorn Stadium, adjacent to the Roberto Clemente Coliseum, was also contributing to this era in Puerto Rico's boxing history. That stadium has seen 71 boxing events including fights by Rosario, Benitez, Gomez, Azumah Nelson, (including the fight between Gomez and Nelson on December 8, 1984) Alexis Arguello, and the August 7, 1983, contest between Camacho and Mexico's Rafael Limon, fought for the WBC's vacant Junior Lightweight title and which Camacho won by fifth-round technical knockout.

On September 1, 1973, José Roman became the first Puerto Rican to challenge for the world Heavyweight title. He lost that day to George Foreman by a first-round knockout in Tokyo, Japan.

The fight between Ali and Jean Pierre Coopman, which took place February 20, 1976, at the Roberto Clemente Coliseum, was the only time a world Heavyweight championship fight was contested in Puerto Rico; it was won by Ali by a fifth-round knockout. Elsewhere, the first fight between Arguello and Escalera, the so-called "Bloody Battle of Bayamon", was fought on Saturday, January 28, 1978, at the Juan Ramon Loubriel Stadium in the San Juan neighboring city of Bayamon. Considered by many fans and experts as a classic, the bout, for Escalera's WBC world Junior Lightweight title, was won by Nicaragua's Arguello by a thirteenth-round technical knockout.

Benitez's gym-mate, Esteban De Jesus, also formed part of this era. On Friday, November 17, 1972, he became the first boxer to defeat the feared, World Boxing Association's world Lightweight champion Duran, winning by ten-rounds unanimous decision, after dropping Duran in round one, in a non-title affair held at the Madison Square Garden in New York, and beginning the Duran-De Jesus trilogy of fights. Duran and De Jesus rematched with the WBA world Lightweight title on the line on March 16, 1974, at the Gimnasio Nuevo Panama (now Roberto Duran Arena, named after Duran); the WBC title was not on the line as it was now held by Rodolfo Gonzalez, who had beaten Chango Carmona for that title. In a tremendous fight, De Jesus again dropped Duran in round one, but Duran got up and dropped De Jesus in round seven before stopping him in round eleven to retain the crown. Rodolfo Gonzalez, meanwhile; lost the WBC title to Ishimatsu Suzuki, who, in turn, lost it to De Jesus, who became the WBC world Lightweight champion by outpointing the Japanese boxer over fifteen rounds at the Juan Ramon Loubriel Stadium in Bayamon on Saturday, May 8, 1976. De Jesus defended his title successfully three times and won one non-title bout, setting the long-awaited third match with Duran, which was fought on January 21, 1978, in Las Vegas as an unification match for the WBA and WBC world Lightweight titles. The third time around, Duran dominated a valiant De Jesus and won by a twelfth-round technical knockout. De Jesus would fight on until 1981 when, afflicted by drug addiction, he murdered a teenage boy. He was sentenced to life in prison but was diagnosed with HIV during the middle 1980s, becoming the first world champion boxer to die of AIDS disease in 1989, but not before being pardoned by Puerto Rico governor Rafael Hernandez Colon and then released from jail, later receiving a public visit and a hug from his former ring nemesis Duran.

On Saturday, March 6, 1976, Benitez made history by becoming the youngest world boxing champion ever when, at the age of 17, he beat Colombia's Antonio Cervantes by a fifteen-rounds split decision, for Cervantes' WBA's world Junior Welterweight title at the Hiram Bithorn Stadium.

Samuel Serrano won the WBA's world Junior Lightweight title by defeating Ben Villaflor by a fifteen-rounds unanimous decision on Saturday, October 16, 1976, at the Hiram Bithorn Stadium in San Juan. With Alfredo Escalera having won the WBC world Junior Lightweight title on Saturday, July 5, 1975, by knocking out Kuniaki Shibata in two rounds at Nara, Japan, the two boxers made history by becoming the first two Puerto Ricans to hold world titles simultaneously in the same division, a feat that would be repeated many times thereafter by other Puerto Rican boxers.

Also in 1975 but on Saturday, June 28 at the Roberto Clemente Coliseum in San Juan, one week before Escalera's world championship victory, Angel Espada of Salinas, beat Clyde Gray of Canada to lift the WBA's vacant world Welterweight title, a belt that had been stripped from Cuban Jose Napoles for failing to defend it against Espada. With Espada and Escalera's wins, Puerto Rico, having had only 3 world champions previously, almost doubled its amount of world champions in the space of a single week, from three to five.

On May 21, 1977, at the Roberto Clemente Coliseum in San Juan, Gomez recuperated from a first-round knockdown to defeat South Korean WBC world Super-Bantamweight champion Dong Kyun Yum, winning his first of three titles, later beginning a string of 17 world title defenses, all won by knockout, the streak of knockouts in world title defenses constituting a world record in boxing.

In November 1979, Sixto Escobar died, becoming the first Puerto Rican world champion boxer to pass away. Also in November 1979, on Friday, November 23, specifically, Willie Classen of Santurce, Puerto Rico, fought Wilford Scypion at the Felt Forum in New York City. Classen lost the fight by a tenth-round technical knockout and later died from his injuries, becoming the first Puerto Rican professional boxer ever to die of injuries caused during a contest.

== 1980s ==
By the start of the 1980s, the popularity of professional boxing in Puerto Rico was largely influenced by the Puerto Rican boxers of the day and also by Puerto Rican television networks such as WAPA-TV, Telemundo Puerto Rico, Teleluz and others, which carried both international and local fights regularly. Bouts such as Wilfredo Gomez vs. Lupe Pintor and Wilfred Benitez vs. Thomas Hearns, Aaron Pryor vs. Alexis Arguello, Salvador Sanchez vs. Azumah Nelson, Larry Holmes vs. Tim Witherspoon and the two Michael Dokes vs. Mike Weaver contests (Holmes vs. Witherspoon and the Dokes vs. Weaver rematch were both on May 20, 1983) and Ray Mancini vs. Bobby Chacon were telecast live and free of charge; television commentators for these fights included Rafael Bracero, Luis Rigual, Junior Abrams and Norman H. Davila. Local fights, if a world title was being disputed, were carried on national television days after they had taken place, to encourage public attendance to those events. The latter were, however, carried live on radio stations. Television boxing broadcasts in Puerto Rico were typically sponsored by such brands and companies as Ron Palo Viejo, Bacardi, Pizza Hut, Eastern Airlines, Deportes Salvador Colom, Don Q, Banco Popular de Puerto Rico and others. These brands and companies hoped that viewership of the boxing contests would help them recoup their small investment in the upcoming days, weeks and months.

By 1980, both Benitez and Gomez were considered national heroes by most Puerto Rican boxing fans and their celebrity had reached mainstream status.

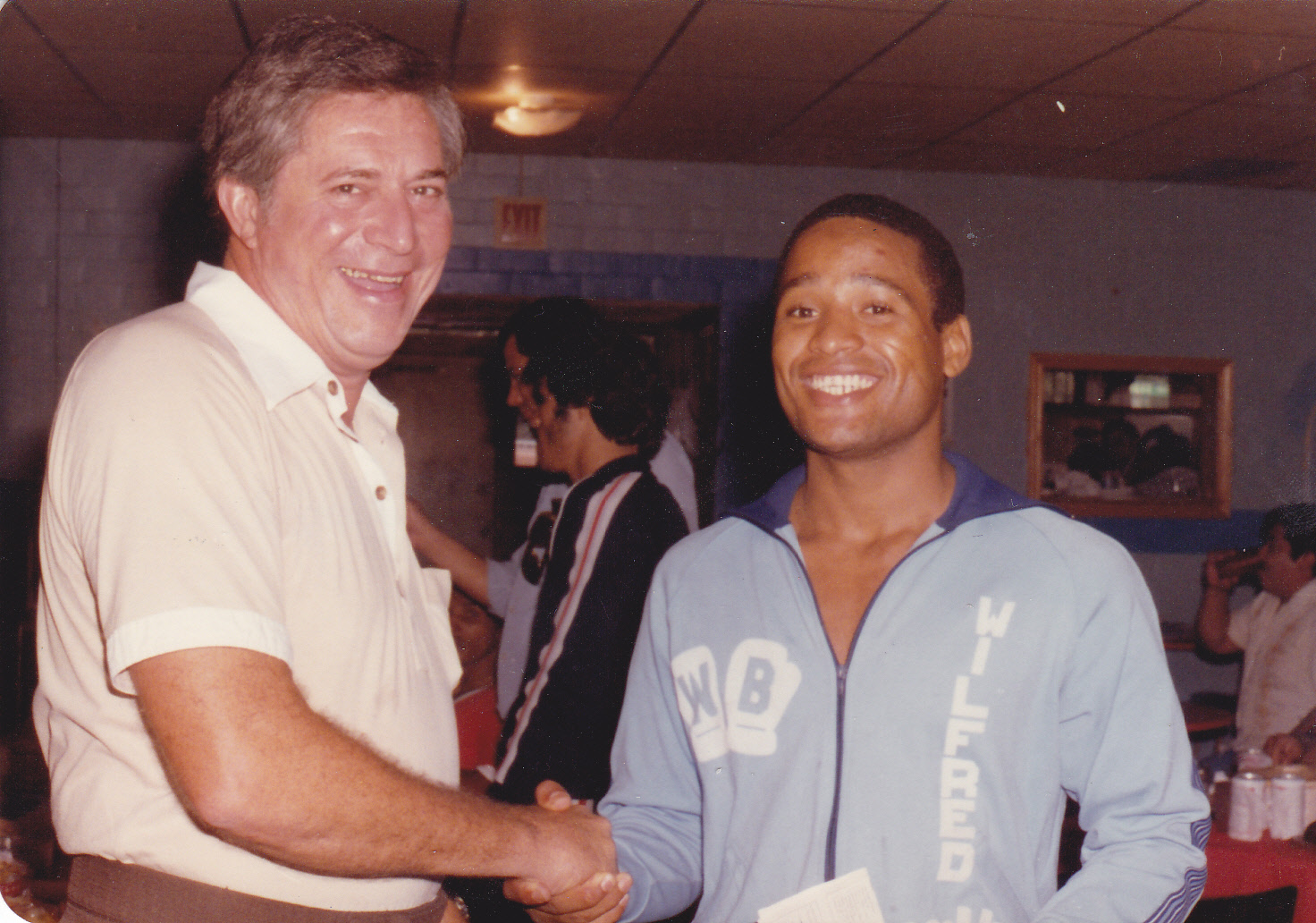
Wilfred Benitez (right) in 1980

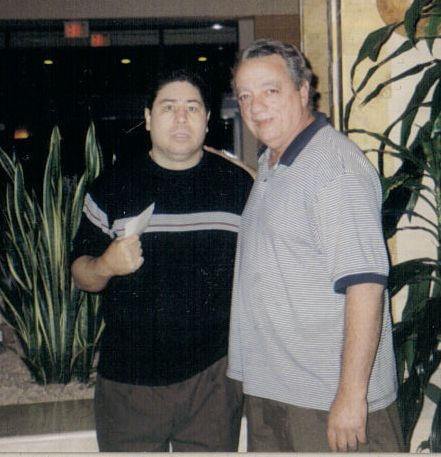
Wilfredo Gómez (left) in 2003

New talents began to emerge in the 1980s for Puerto Rican professional boxing. These included Juan Laporte, who debuted in 1977 Edwin Rosario, who debuted in 1979 and Hector Camacho, who debuted in 1980.

On May 21, 1981, Benitez became the first Latino to become a three-division world champion as well as the youngest boxer to do so, when he knocked out WBC world Junior-Middleweight champion Maurice Hope in twelve rounds at the Caesar's Palace Hotel in Las Vegas, lifting that championship.

A monumental moment in the history of the boxing rivalry between Puerto Rico and Mexico took place on August 21, 1981, also at the Caesar's Palace Hotel in Las Vegas, Nevada, when Wilfredo Gomez, the WBC world Super-Bantamweight champion who was undefeated in 33 fights, with one tie, and all 32 wins coming by knockout, challenged Mexican Salvador Sánchez, the WBC world Featherweight champion who had a record of 40 wins, 1 loss and 1 tie in 42 bouts, with 30 wins by knockout, for the latter's world title. Sanchez established himself early by dropping Gomez in round one, and although Gomez tried very hard to turn the fight around, Sanchez won the bout by an eighth-round knockout in a fight that is remembered as a pivotal one in the rivalry.

Another historical moment for Puerto Rican boxing took place a few months after Sánchez-Gomez, when, on November 14, 1981, also in Las Vegas but this time at the Showboat Hotel and Casino, Wilfred Benitez took on future IBF world Junior-Middleweight champion Carlos Santos, Benitez defending the WBC world Junior-Middleweight title. This bout was significant because it pitted two Puerto Ricans fighting for a world championship, it being the first instance when such a pairing took place in boxing history. Benitez scored a flash knockdown in round six on his way to retaining the title by a 15-rounds unanimous decision, in a fight that was televised by HBO Boxing.

Benitez was back fighting on HBO when he next defended the title, in a "super-fight", a major contest between two super-stars, when he faced legendary Panamanian Roberto Duran at the Caesar's Palace Hotel to defend his WBC world Junior-Middleweight title. Benitez retained the title by outpointing Duran, winning by a fifteen-rounds unanimous decision on Saturday, January 30, 1982.

Meanwhile, Carlos De Leon had won the WBC's world Cruiserweight title on November 25, 1980 by beating champion Marvin Camel in New Orleans, Louisiana. When Ossie Ocasio won the vacant WBA world Cruiserweight title by beating Robbie Williams by a fifteen-rounds split decision at Johannesburg, South Africa on Saturday, February 13, 1982, not only did Ocasio become the WBA's inaugural world champion in that division, but De Leon and Ocasio, who were personal friends, became the second pair of Puerto Ricans to hold world titles at the same division simultaneously, after Escalera and Serrano. De Leon lost his title in 1982 to ST Gordon but regained it from the same fighter in 1983, while Ocasio held his title until 1984, so De Leon and Ocasio repeated the feat. De Leon was also the first boxer to win a world Cruiserweight title two, three and four times, as he kept losing and recapturing his belt through the 1980s, setting and breaking his own record for most times as world Cruiserweight champion.

On December 3, 1982, Gomez and Benitez fought in the same program for the first time, Gomez defending his WBC world Super-Bantamweight title against WBC world Bantamweight champion Lupe Pintor of Mexico and Benitez defending his WBC world Super-Welterweight title against former WBA world Welterweight champion Thomas Hearns of the United States. Gomez-Pintor forms another well-known chapter in the boxing rivalry between Mexico and Puerto Rico Gomez retained the title with a 14th-round technical knockout victory, completing his 17th defense of that title, all of which were won by knockout. On the other hand, Hearns outpointed Benitez, winning the WBC world Super-Welterweight title by a fifteen-rounds majority decision. Another Puerto Rican named Wilfredo who would later join Benitez and Gomez as a three-division world champion and form part of the history of boxing in Puerto Rico, Wilfredo Vazquez, was also scheduled to fight at the program, held at the Superdome in New Orleans, Louisiana, but he had to cancel his contest because of an injury which he suffered in training for it. Gomez-Pintor and Benitez-Hearns were both showcased live on HBO Boxing.

In 1983, former light-heavyweight champion of the world José Torres was elected to serve as New York State Athletic Commission commissioner. He served on that position until 1985.

The death, in November 1982, of boxer Duk Koo Kim after a fight against Ray Mancini led the WBC to shorten their world-title fights from fifteen rounds to twelve, starting in 1983. On Sunday, February 20, 1983, WBC world Featherweight champion, the Guayaman Juan Laporte, who resided in New York City, defended his title against Mexican-American Ruben Castillo at the Roberto Clemente Coliseum in San Juan, in the first-ever world championship fight to be scheduled for twelve rounds in the country. In the fight, which constituted another chapter of the Puerto Rico and Puerto Rican-Americans versus Mexico and Mexican-Americans boxing rivalry, Laporte dropped Castillo twice en route to a twelve-rounds unanimous decision victory. Rafael Solis and Mexican great Rene Arredondo also won fights in that boxing show. Laporte had won the championship left vacant by the death of Mexican legend Salvador Sánchez.

On November 18, 1983, Hector Camacho defended his WBC world Junior Lightweight title against Rafael Solis in another HBO Boxing-televised event. While Wilfred Benitez and Carlos Santos had staged the first world title fight involving two Puerto Ricans and Camacho-Solis was the second fight for a world title involving two Puerto Ricans, since Benitez was born in New York, Camacho-Solis became the first world title fight in boxing history involving two boxers who were native of Puerto Rico, as Camacho was born in Bayamon, while Solis was born in the San Juan ward of Rio Piedras. In a bout held at the Roberto Clemente Coliseum, Camacho retained his title by a fifth-round knockout. Solis was attempting to become part of the first pair of Puerto Rican brothers to be world champion boxers; his brother Julian, had been WBA world Bantamweight champion in 1980.

On Sunday, March 11, 1984, Mark Medal, an American of Puerto Rican descent, won the IBFs inaugural world Junior Middleweight championship bout, stopping Earl Hargrove in five rounds to lift the vacant title at the Sands Casino and Hotel in Atlantic City, New Jersey. With this victory, Puerto Rico surpassed Panama for third place on the list of countries with the most world boxing champions.

Major boxing events continued being telecast in Puerto Rico live and free of charge by Puerto Rican networks from the mid to the late 1980s; these included Thomas Hearns vs. Roberto Duran, Hearns vs. Marvin Hagler, Hagler vs. Sugar Ray Leonard, Leonard's third fight with Roberto Duran, Wilfredo Gomez vs. Juan Laporte, Azumah Nelson and Rocky Lockridge,(the three latter contests re-transmitted on television days after they took place, since they were all held in San Juan) Jose Luis Ramirez vs. Hector Camacho Sr., Donald Curry vs. Milton McCrory, Julio Cesar Chavez vs. Rocky Lockridge, Chavez's challenge of Edwin Rosario, Duran's challenge of Iran Barkley and many Mike Tyson contests, including his major fight with Michael Spinks, his world Heavyweight title unification fight with Tony Tucker, Larry Holmes' challenge of him, the first Tyson-Bruno match and, also, Hector Camacho vs. Ray Mancini.

On June 13, 1986, a fight that divided Puerto Ricans, both in Puerto Rico and elsewhere, and also international boxing fans, took place at the Madison Square Garden in New York, as the main event of a program that also included a world title defense by Julio Cesar Chavez and an early career Mike Tyson contest. Televised on HBO Boxing, the fight between Puerto Ricans Hector Camacho and Edwin Rosario was for Camacho's WBC world Lightweight championship, which Rosario was trying to recover. In a classic match, Camacho overcame tough patches in rounds five and eleven to eke out a 12-rounds split decision and retain the title, The result of the fight has been argued by fans ever since and remains a controversial topic among boxing fans and experts alike.

On Friday, September 26, 1986, the WBA's world Lightweight champion, Livingstone Bramble, defended his title against Rosario and Hector Camacho defended his WBC world Lightweight championship versus the former WBC world Junior-Lightweight champion, Uganda's Cornelius Boza-Edwards. The two fights were co-promoted by Don King and Miami-based promoters Willy Martinez and Felix Zabala. Don King's intentions were for Bramble and Camacho to win and then for King to stage a unification bout between those two; the program was actually named "preamble to Bramble"; however, Rosario knocked Bramble out that night at the Abel Holtz Stadium in Miami Beach, Florida, in round two, while Camacho dropped Boza-Edwards in round one en route to a 12-rounds unanimous decision victory. Camacho and Rosario thus imitated Escalera and Serrano and De Leon and Ocasio before them in being Puerto Rican boxers who held world championships in the same division at the same time. A rematch between them seemed imminent, but it never took place. Those fights were also televised by HBO Boxing.

By this time, Wilfred Benitez and Wilfredo Gomez were already out of world championships pictures; Benitez having fought his last world title match against Hearns in 1982 and Gomez against Alfredo Layne in May 1986. Camacho, Rosario, Wilfredo Vazquez and, to a lesser extent, John John Molina and Juan Carazo represented the new stars of Puerto Rican boxing.

Also in 1986, Ivonne Class became the first Puerto Rican female professional boxing promoter. Many of her shows at that era began to be televised on Puerto Rico's Tele-Once television channel, which became another major supporter of boxing on television at the country during that era and later began showing many world title bouts including Mike Tyson fights. Another well-known Puerto Rican boxing promoter was former Major League Baseball pitcher José "Pantalones" Santiago.

On Sunday, October 4, 1987, Wilfredo Vazquez won his first of three world championships, when he knocked out defending WBA world Bantamweight champion Chan Young Park in ten rounds at the Hilton Hotel in Seoul, South Korea.

In 1988, the World Boxing Organization (WBO) was established after a group of men broke away from a WBA convention at Isla Margarita, Venezuela. The WBO soon established itself in San Juan, becoming the first major world championships sanctioning body to hail from Puerto Rico.

On Saturday, April 29, 1989, John John Molina won the WBO's vacant world Super-Featherweight (Junior-Lightweight) title, outpointing former WBC world Featherweight champion Juan Laporte with a twelve-rounds unanimous decision at the Roberto Clemente Coliseum in San Juan to conquer the first of what would be a number of world championships. On that same program, another Puerto Rican, Jose Ruiz, would conquer the WBO's vacant world Super-Flyweight title, by beating former WBC world champion, Colombia's Sugar Baby Rojas. For his part, Caguas' Carazo, who had recently defeated Argentina's legendary Santos Laciar by a twelve-rounds split decision, fought Mexico's Gilberto Roman for the Mexican's WBC world Super-Flyweight title on Monday, June 5, 1989, at the Great Western Forum in Inglewood, California. Despite dropping Roman in round four and being one second away from being crowned world champion (as Roman got up from that knockdown at the count of nine out of a ten-seconds count), Carazo lost that bout by twelve-rounds unanimous decision.

On September 9 of that same year (1989), Ruiz would defend his WBO title against Carazo, knocking him out in the first round at the Roberto Clemente Coliseum in San Juan.

== 1990s: Macho Time, Titomania ==
In 1990, then-current Puerto Rican boxing standouts included John John Molina, Wilfredo Vazquez, Hector "Macho" Camacho Sr., Edwin Rosario, and Rosario's nemesis Juan Nazario.

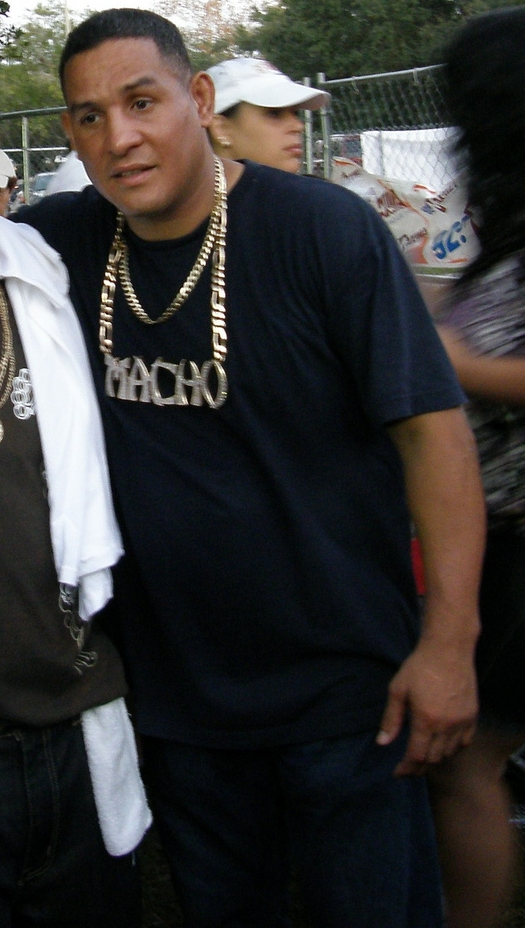
Hector Camacho in 2009

Early in 1990, a small controversy ensued between Felix Trinidad Sr., a former national Featherweight champion in Puerto Rico, and the Puerto Rican Boxing Commission, regarding the possible participation of Trinidad Sr.'s son, Felix Trinidad, at the 1992 Barcelona, Spain, Summer Olympics, the Trinidads taking the decision of having Felix Jr. become a professional boxer instead. On March 10, 1990, Trinidad Jr., debuted as a professional boxer, knocking out the also debuting Angel Romero in round two at Miramar ward, San Juan, Puerto Rico.

Also in 1990, former world light-heavyweight champion José Torres of Ponce was elected as president of the surging World Boxing Organization; although at the time the WBO was not considered a major world boxing sanctioning body by either the three other sanctioning groups, boxing magazines or fans, eventually, with Torres' and with Francisco Varcarcel's help, it was, therefore Torres became the first Puerto Rican person to be president of one of professional boxing's four major recognizing bodies. Torres was president of the WBO until 1995.

On Wednesday, April 4, 1990, at the Madison Square Garden in New York, Nazario beat Rosario by an eighth-round technical knockout, lifting the WBA world Lightweight championship and avenging a loss that Rosario had, coincidentally, inflicted him in the same round and for the same title but in Chicago, Illinois two and a half years before. This had been Rosario's third term as world Lightweight champion. The Rosario-Nazario rematch was televised by HBO Boxing.

On Saturday, August 11, 1990, Camacho Sr. successfully defended his WBO world Junior-Welterweight title by beating his personal friend, Tony Baltazar by a twelve-rounds unanimous decision at the Caesars Tahoe hotel in Stateline, Nevada. That same evening and at the same location, Nazario fought Pernell Whitaker, trying to unify his WBA world Lightweight title with the WBC and IBF ones, which were held at the time by Whitaker. In a rare show of power by him, Whitaker stopped the Puerto Rican, winning by first-round knockout.

On February 23, 1991, Camacho lost his WBO world Junior-Welterweight title to Greg Haugen in a fight at the Caesar's Palace in Las Vegas. Camacho and Haugen were close on the scorecards, but a moment in round twelve when Camacho refused to touch gloves with his challenger proved costly: Camacho was deducted a point by referee Carlos Padilla and as a consequence, he lost the fight by scorecards of 113–114 and 112–114 against him and a 114–112 for him. Haugen allegedly had an illegal substance found on his body during the after-fight urinalysis, and the result was over-turned into a no-contest; the WBO retained Haugen as their champion; the result was again overturned into a Camacho loss after Camacho's 1992 contest with Julio Cesar Chavez Sr. Camacho-Haugen I is considered a boxing classic by such outlets as ESPN.

Haugen and Camacho had an immediate rematch, held on May 18, 1991, at the Reno-Sparks Convention Center in Reno, Nevada. The second time, Camacho dropped Haugen in round eleven and edged out an equally close, split decision to reclaim the WBO world Junior-Welterweight title, with scores of 115–112 and 114–113 for him and 112–115 against him. The possible match between him and Julio Cesar Chavez Sr. was now one of the most hotly anticipated fights of the era by then.

On Friday, June 14, 1991, Rosario beat Loreto Garza by way of a third-round knockout to win his fourth world championship and his second divisional title, the WBA world Junior-Welterweight championship, in a contest which was carried on HBO Boxing's Pay-Per-View leg, TVKO. This fight took place at the Arco Arena. in champion Garza's hometown of Sacramento, California. This was Rosario's last win of significance; he soon lost his title to Akinobu Hiranaka of Japan and faced drug and alcohol problems. Rosario died in December 1997.

On October 4, 1991, Ponce's Alex Sanchez debuted by beating Carlos Figueroa by a first-round knockout at the western Puerto Rican city of Mayaguez, in a Minimumweight bout. Sanchez would later emerge as a lower-weights star and also establish himself as a mainstream celebrity in the island.

In 1991, Carlos Ortiz became the first Puerto Rican boxer to be elected into the International Boxing Hall of Fame.

Another monumental moment in the history of the Puerto Rico-Mexico boxing rivalry took place when Julio Cesar Chavez defended his WBC world Junior-Welterweight title against Hector Camacho, in a contest that gained great attention in Mexico, Puerto Rico and internationally. Camacho's WBO world Junior-Welterweight title was not at stake because at the time, the WBC did not recognize the WBO as a world boxing sanctioning entity. Chavez pressured Camacho relentlessly, ultimately winning by a 12-rounds unanimous decision and retaining his belt. That fight was held on Mexican Independence Day's weekend, on September 12, 1992, at the Thomas and Mack Center, also in Las Vegas, Nevada.

Nine months later, another Puerto Rican, Felix Trinidad Jr., became the 30th Puerto Rican boxer to become a world champion, when he beat defending IBF world Welterweight titlist Maurice Blocker by a second-round knockout to lift the championship at the Sports Arena in San Diego, California on Saturday, June 19, 1993. Camacho himself fought in the program, which was televised in the United States by the Showtime Network's Showtime Championship Boxing show. In the program, Camacho beat Tom Alexander by a seventh-round technical knockout.

Trinidad's win over Blocker began a title reign that saw him defend his championship 15 times over the next six years, adding the WBC championship along the way.

On December 22, 1993, Alex Sanchez became the WBO's world Minimumweight champion, defeating Orlando Malone for the vacant belt at the Caribe Hilton Hotel in San Juan by a first-round knockout. Eventually, a match-up between Sanchez and Mexico's Ricardo Lopez would become one of the most anticipated fights among the lower weights in the decade.

Dommys Delgado Berty, a Puerto Rican boxing administrator, became a WBO supervisor in 1993; she first supervised a WBO world championship fight when she went to Zaragoza, Spain, to supervise a bout between her countryman, WBO world Super-Bantamweight champion Daniel Jimenez and the Spanish challenger Felix Garcia Losada from Pamplona, contest which took place on Friday, October 29, at Zaragoza's Pabellon Principe Felipe. Puerto Rico's Jimenez won that fight to retain his title, by a fifth-round technical knockout. Delgado Berty would later become one of the main female personalities in Puerto Rican boxing (see below).

On January 29, 1994, Trinidad made both his Las Vegas and his Pay-Per-View boxing debut when he faced Camacho with Trinidad's IBF world Welterweight title on the line. Unlike on his previous challenge of Chavez, (where he was merely trying to win another world championship belt in a division in which he had already won world championships twice) Camacho this time was attempting to become a member of the four divisions world champions group. This fight was viewed by boxing fans as a sort of passing the torch type of fight, between a legend from the past decade in Camacho and a future star in Trinidad. It was fought as part of a program headlined by Chavez's WBC world Junior-Welterweight championship bout against American Frankie Randall (a bout in which Chavez suffered his first loss in ninety fights, by a twelve-rounds split decision). Trinidad beat Camacho by unanimous decision to retain his championship, with scores of 116–110, 119–106 and 117–109, all in Trinidad's favor.

On September 3, 1994, Daniel Jiménez established a world record for the quickest knockout in a championship fight, defeating Harald Geier in 17 seconds (currently the second fastest).

By the mid-1990s, Puerto Rican boxing stars included Trinidad Jr., Wilfredo Vazquez Sr., John John Molina, Daniel Jiménez, Alex Sanchez, Daniel Alicea and Josue Camacho. Hector Camacho Sr., and Edwin Rosario, meanwhile, were veterans who were still active, in Rosario's case, until his death in December 1997. Also by this time, Molina had been a three-time world Junior-Lightweight champion, as WBO and then IBF champion in 1989 when he beat first Juan Laporte and then Tony Lopez, and then in 1992, when he beat Jackie Gunguluza in South Africa. Continuing the Mexico (and Mexican-American) versus Puerto Rico (and Puerto Rican-American) boxing rivalry, Molina challenged Oscar De La Hoya for De La Hoya's WBO world Junior-Welterweight championship, at the MGM Grand Hotel in Las Vegas on Saturday, February 18, 1995. Molina gave the young champion a good fight; some fans and critics alike even suggested he should have won it by a close margin, including HBO Boxing's Harold Lederman. De La Hoya, however, retained the belt by a twelve-rounds unanimous decision.

On Saturday, May 18, 1996, Wilfredo Vazquez fought Venezuelan Eloy "Kiki" Rojas for Rojas' WBA world Featherweight title. Deeply behind on the scorecards, Vazquez rallied to score a spectacular, highlight-reel film eleventh-round knockout to win the world title. Having beaten Chang-Yong Park for the organization's world Bantamweight title in 1987 and Raul Perez in 1992 for the organization's world Super Bantamweight title, Vazquez made history by becoming the first three-division world champion to win all three titles with the same organization in boxing history.

On March 1, 1997, Hector Camacho faced Sugar Ray Leonard for the lowly-regarded, International Boxing Council's Middleweight championship. There were speculations that the winner of this fight would face the winner of the upcoming, WBC world Welterweight title match between Pernell Whitaker and Oscar De La Hoya. Camacho won the match, sending the illustrious Leonard into retirement by knocking him out in five rounds at the Convention Center in Atlantic City, New Jersey, giving the American his first knockout loss in a fight televised on Pay-Per-View.

On Saturday, April 12, 1997, De La Hoya beat Pernell Whitaker by a 12-rounds unanimous decision to win the WBC's world Welterweight title. The bout itself did not have particular meaning as far as the history of boxing in Puerto Rico, but it had repercussions, because soon, De La Hoya would meet the challenge of three Puerto Ricans, Wilfredo Rivera and legends Camacho Sr. and Trinidad Jr.

The longly awaited-for unification bout between Sanchez and Mexican legend, the undefeated (46–0) Ricardo Lopez, took place on Saturday, August 27, 1997, at the Madison Square Garden in New York city, once again igniting the Mexico-Puerto Rico boxing rivalry. Lopez dominated a brave but overmatched Sanchez, knocking him out in round five to retain his WBC world title and add the WBO one to it. With a record of 51 wins, 0 losses and 1 draw (tie), Lopez later retired as a boxing legend and one of the very few world champions ever to retire undefeated.

On September 13, 1997, once again at Mexican Independence Day weekend, Oscar De La Hoya defended his WBC world Welterweight title against Héctor Camacho Sr., who was once again attempting to join the exclusive group of four-division world champions, in a Pay-Per-View event from the Thomas And Mack Center in Las Vegas. De La Hoya dominated the contest, nicknamed "Opposites Attack", despite Camacho's resilience and courage, dropping Camacho in round nine on his way to a comfortable, 12-rounds unanimous decision victory. By this time, clamor for a unification fight between the young stars, De La Hoya and Trinidad, was growing.

On Saturday, April 18, 1998, Vazquez challenged the legendary boxer from England, Naseem Hamed, for Hamed's WBO world Featherweight title. Hamed was making his tenth title defense. Vazquez had been a world traveler in his world championship fighting days, including fights in Mexico, Spain, France, Japan and the United States. Hamed dominated Vazquez before stopping him in round seven of the last major fight in Vazquez's career, at the Nynex Arena in Manchester, England.

On February 13, 1999, Oscar De La Hoya defeated former WBA world welterweight champion Ike Quartey of Ghana by a twelve-rounds split decision in a tremendous war at Las Vegas' Thomas and Mack Center, to retain his WBC world welterweight title. This contest was shown on HBO Pay-Per-View. The next week, Felix Trinidad defended his IBF world welterweight title against a legendary but faded rival, former four-division world champion Pernell Whitaker at the Madison Square Garden in New York city, in a fight carried live on HBO Boxing. Trinidad dropped Whitaker and dominated the bout, winning by a rather easy twelve-rounds unanimous decision to retain the belt, further cementing the seeds for a super-fight showdown between the two young superstars and world welterweight champions.

By then, Trinidad's popularity was growing in Puerto Rico; he was now a crossover celebrity and the worshipping he received from some of his fans began to receive the nickname of "Titomania".

After De La Hoya further defended his title against Oba Carr by eleventh-round knockout on Saturday, May 22, 1999, at the Mandalay Bay Resort and Casino in Las Vegas, and Trinidad defended his against Colombian Hugo Pineda by a fourth-round knockout seven days later, on May 29 at the Roberto Clemente Coliseum in San Juan, the stage was set for the major super-fight between the two world champions. An international press-tour that saw the two visit Puerto Rico, the United States and Mexico, among other places, ensued, while the fans awaited for the contest to take place.

Their fight finally took place on September 18, 1999, once again near Mexican Independence Day. It was held at the Mandalay Bay Hotel and Casino in Las Vegas, Nevada. Trinidad-De La Hoya was for Trinidad's IBF belt and De La Hoya's WBC belt. It was a controversial bout; the fight's result was still being debated decades later. De La Hoya apparently thought he had built a lead large enough so that the fight was his after round nine, but Trinidad became more aggressive after that round and closed the fight winning the last three rounds on the scorecards which proved pivotal in his securing a majority-decision victory with scores of 115–113 and 115–114 for him, and a 114–114 tie. With the victory, Trinidad defended his IBF belt for the fifteenth time and annexed the WBC one. Thousands of his fans celebrated the win in Puerto Rico, and he was the object of a large welcoming at Luis Munoz Marin International Airport and all the way from there to his house in Cupey the next day. De La Hoya-Trinidad is also considered a chapter of the Mexicans-Puerto Ricans boxing rivalry.

By the late 1990s, the landscape of programming showing free professional boxing fights had changed in Puerto Rico: most major fights were shown on the pay-per-view system, largely leaving WAPA-TV and Telemundo to showing occasional local programs as free television boxing.

== 2000s: Trinidad, Cotto, Ruiz ==
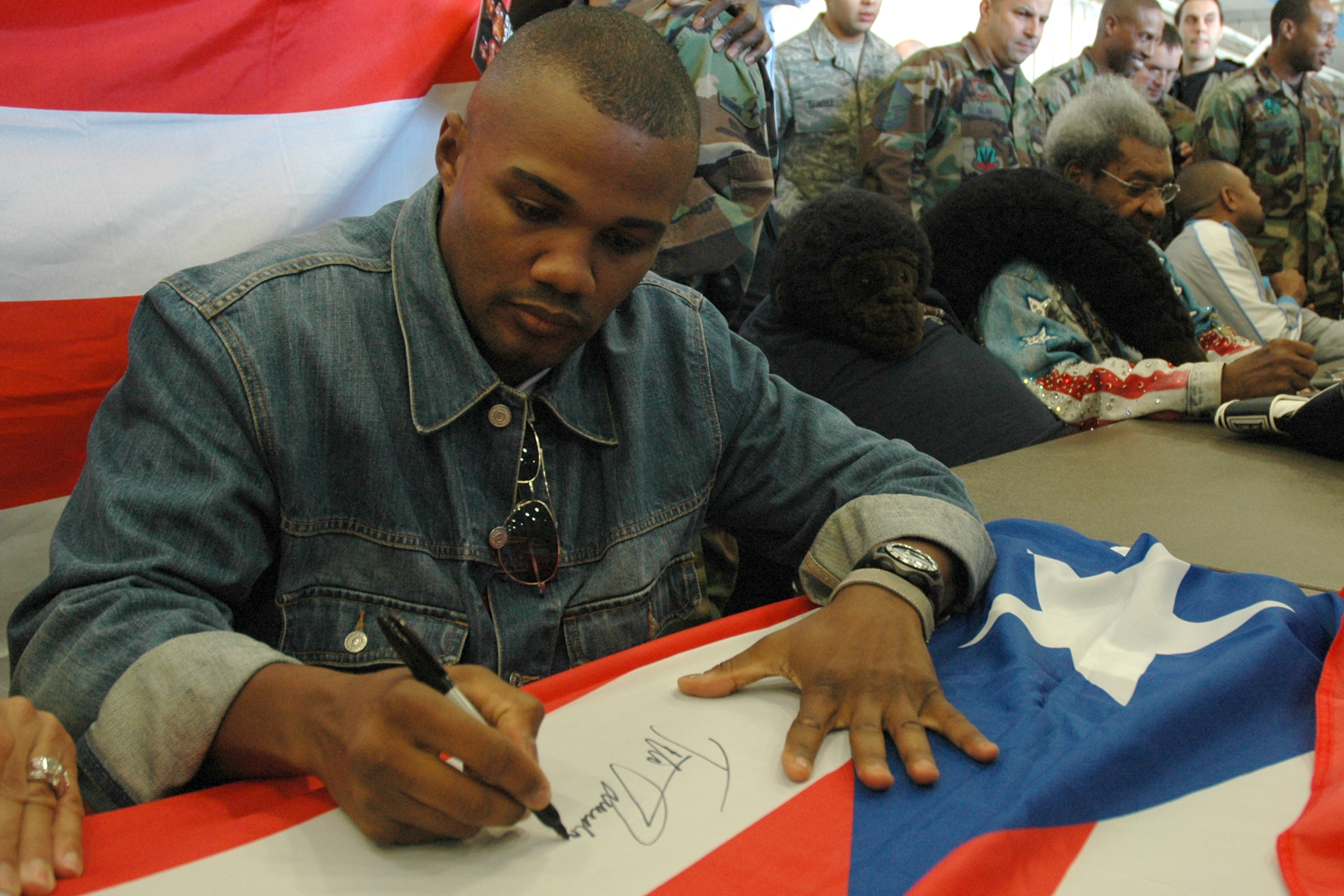
Felix Tito Trinidad signing autographs for fans

In March 2000, Trinidad moved up in weight and challenged the WBA world Junior Middleweight champion David Reid, their fight coming on March 3 at the Caesar's Palace Hotel in Las Vegas. Shown on the Showtime network's Pay-Per-View, the bout was won by Trinidad, who was dropped once in round three but who recuperated to drop Reid once in round seven and three times in round eleven. Trinidad prevailed by a twelve-rounds unanimous decision with two scores of 114–106 and one of 114–107 to capture a world title at a second division. Like after the De La Hoya contest, Trinidad was the object of a large welcoming by fans from the airport to his home in Cupey.

Meanwhile, John Ruiz, an American of Puerto Rican descendance, was getting attention as a Heavyweight contender. After Lennox Lewis defeated Evander Holyfield for the WBA, WBC, and IBF heavyweight titles in late 1999, the WBA ordered Lewis to defend the title against mandatory challenger Ruiz, but Lewis refused. Though he had been undefeated since his 1st round 19 second loss against David Tua in 1996, the level of competition Ruiz had been facing was suspect and the only fighter with a recognizable name he had beaten (to date) was a nearly 40-year-old former IBF world champion Tony Tucker.

Ruiz and his management sued, claiming that WBA rules entitled him to a title shot. A judge agreed, but rather than face Ruiz in a bout that was seen as commercially unattractive, Lewis instead fought Michael Grant, considered to be a very worthy contender at the time, having knocked out a series of recognized "name" opponents on HBO. After learning of this, the judge decreed that upon entering the ring against Grant on April 29, 2000, Lewis would automatically forfeit the WBA title.

On Saturday, August 12, 2000, Ruiz became the third Puerto Rican to fight for a world Heavyweight title (joining José Roman and Ossie Ocasio, who had challenged Larry Holmes for the WBC title in 1979) when he took on Holyfield for the WBA's vacant championship at the Paris Las Vegas hotel in Las Vegas. Holyfield won a unanimous but controversial decision, with two scores of 114–113 and a 116–112 for Holyfield, thus continuing a historical futility for Hispanic boxers in attempting to conquer a world Heavyweight title that had seen such notables as Roman, Ocasio, Argentina's Luis Angel Firpo, the Basque Country's Paulino Uzcudun, Chile's Arturo Godoy, Uruguay's Alfredo Evangelista, the French-Moroccan of Spanish descent Lucien Rodriguez, Cuba's Jorge Luis Gonzalez and, now, Ruiz, compete for such a belt but fail.

At the same time, interest was growing for a fight between Felix Trinidad and IBF world Junior Welterweight champion Fernando Vargas, which, like Trinidad-De La Hoya, would also become a chapter of the Puerto Rico (and Puerto Rican-Americans) boxing rivalry against Mexico (and Mexican-Americans). Their bout came on Saturday, December 2, 2000, at the Mandalay Bay Resort and Casino in Las Vegas. In a spectacular fight, Trinidad dropped Vargas twice in round one, then got dropped in round four before dropping Vargas again, three times, in round twelve to unify his WBA world title with the IBF one by way of a twelfth-round technical knockout victory. As it was common by now, Trinidad received a large welcome at San Juan's airport from his fans after the contest.

On Saturday, February 17, 2001, future star Ivan Calderon debuted as a professional boxer at the MGM Grand Hotel in Las Vegas, Nevada. Calderon, a Minimumweight who would become a two-division world champion, knocked out Sergio Diaz in the first round that night.

Six days later, Friday, February 23, 2001, marked the debut of another future Puerto Rican legend, Miguel Cotto. Cotto, who had unsuccessfully participated at the 2000 Summer Olympics in Sydney, representing Puerto Rico, fought that night at the Frank Erwin Center in Austin, Texas, facing Jason Doucet in a Junior-Welterweight contest. Cotto won by first-round knockout.

The WBA, meanwhile, ordered a rematch between their world Heavyweight champion, Evander Holyfield, and John Ruiz. Their second fight took place on Saturday, March 3, 2001, at the Mandalay Bay Resort and Casino in Las Vegas. This time, Ruiz became the first Hispanic in boxing history to become world Heavyweight champion when he dropped Holyfield in round eleven and went on to win the fight, and the WBA's world Heavyweight title, by a 12-rounds unanimous decision, with scores of 118–110, 115–111 and 114–111, all for him.

On Saturday, May 12, 2001, as part of Don King's Sugar Ray Robinson Trophy tournament to unify the world Middleweight championship, Felix Trinidad challenged WBA world Middleweight champion William Joppy at the Madison Square Garden in New York City. Trinidad dominated the bout, dropping the courageous champion Joppy in rounds one, three and five on his way to join boxing's exclusive group of three-division world champions by winning by a fifth-round technical knockout. Trinidad became the first ever Puerto Rican world Middleweight champion. With Trinidad's victory, added to Ruiz's victory two months before, Puerto Rico became the first country in history to have at least one world champion in every boxing division. Trinidad was once again received by his fans at San Juan when he returned to the island.

Felix Trinidad and Bernard Hopkins were to fight in a contest to unify Trinidad's WBA and Hopkins' IBF and WBC Middleweight world titles on Saturday, September 15, 2001, at the Madison Square Garden in New York city as the conclusion of Don King's Sugar Ray Robinson Trophy Tournament. The fight was, however, postponed due to the tragic events of September 11, 2001, in New York, Washington, D.C., and Pennsylvania, when four jetliners, two of which belonged to American Airlines and to United Airlines each, were deliberately crashed on those locations, killing almost 3,000 people. The fight was contested on September 29 instead, when Hopkins defeated Trinidad by a twelfth-round technical knockout, unifying the titles and inflicting what many feel was the biggest loss by a Puerto Rican boxer since Salvador Sánchez beat Wilfredo Gomez back in 1981. Despite Trinidad losing, thousands still lined the streets in Puerto Rico the day after to welcome him back.

John Ruiz retained the WBA world Heavyweight title on Saturday, December 15, 2001, in a third fight with Evander Holyfield by way of a twelve-rounds draw (tie) at the Foxwoods Resort in Mashantucket, Connecticut, then against Canada's Kirk Johnson by a tenth-round disqualification on Saturday, July 27, 2002, at the Mandalay Bay Resort in Las Vegas, before losing it to Roy Jones Jr. by a twelve-rounds unanimous decision on March 1, 2003, at the Thomas and Mack Center in Las Vegas.

On Saturday, May 3, 2003, at the Mandalay Bay Resort and Casino in Las Vegas, Ivan Calderon won the first of his two world titles, when he faced the WBO world Minimumweight champion, Nicaragua's Eduardo Ray Marquez and defeated him by a ninth-round technical decision to win the championship, as part of a Pay-Per-View televised card headlined by a fight between Oscar De La Hoya and former IBF world Junior Middleweight champion, Yory Boy Campas.

John Ruiz regained the WBA title when Jones Jr., who was Light-Heavyweight champion, decided to return to the Light-Heavyweight division instead and the WBA named Ruiz interim WBA Heavyweight champion. Ruiz defended this title by beating former world Heavyweight champion Hasim Rahman by a twelve-rounds unanimous decision on Saturday, December 13, 2003, as part of an HBO Boxing Pay-Per-View show held at the Boardwalk Hall in Atlantic City, New Jersey.

Also in 2003, Dommys Delgado Berty became the first woman Puerto Rican Boxing Commission commissioner. Her career as a commissioner lasted from 2003 to 2017, a span in which she oversaw 100 boxing shows.

Ruiz was instated as the WBA's full champion after beating Rahman; his next defense, against Puerto Rico's Fres Oquendo, was double-historic in the sense that not only was it the first time two Puerto Ricans fought for a world Heavyweight championship but also the first time two Latino boxers did. Ruiz vs. Oquendo took place on Saturday, April 17, 2004, at the Madison Square Garden in New York and was part of a program that also included Chris Byrd vs. Andrew Golota for Byrd's IBF world Heavyweight title; it was shown live in the United States on Pay-Per-View. Ruiz retained the title by beating Oquendo by an eleventh-round knockout.

On Saturday, September 11, 2004, Miguel Cotto, a native of Providence, Rhode Island, but who had relocated to Caguas, Puerto Rico and is Puerto Rican by parental lineage, fought for his first world title. Cotto faced old amateur nemesis Kelson Pinto of Brazil for the WBO's vacant world Junior Welterweight championship at the Jose Miguel Agrelot Coliseum in San Juan, on that night. Wearing boxing shorts that bore the names of all other Puerto Ricans who had become world champion boxers previously, Cotto dominated the fight and stopped the Brazilian in six rounds to become a world champion himself, the first of many world titles that saw him also become a fan favorite in Puerto Rico and a mainstream celebrity, and get inducted into the International Boxing Hall of Fame.

Yet another star during this era was Daniel Santos, who had conquered the WBO world Welterweight title on Saturday, May 6, 2000, by knocking out Akhmed Kotiev in five rounds at the Swisshotel in Neuss, Nordrhein-Westfalen, Germany. Santos kept winning world title fights through the decade and was a standout performer. Juan Manuel López was also garnering attention; he debuted on Saturday, January 29, 2005, at the Ruben Rodriguez Coliseum in Bayamon, knocking out Luis Daniel Colon in round one.

The Lopez-Colon match was part of a program that was headlined by a much larger, attention-getting contest between Puerto Ricans Alex Sánchez, the former WBO world Minimumweight champion, and Nelson Dieppa from the Puerto Rican archipelago's island of Vieques, who, as WBO world Light-Flyweight champion, was the first world champion ever out of that island. Just like Trinidad-Camacho a decade earlier, many Puerto Ricans saw this world title fight as a passing-of-the-torch event; the former star boxer (Sánchez) versus a current star (Dieppa). Dieppa retained his championship by an eleventh-round knockout.

Miguel Cotto relinquished the WBO world Junior-Welterweight title in late 2006 and announced his intention to move to the welterweight division to fight Carlos Quintana for the WBA's vacant championship. The fight took place on December 2, 2006. Cotto defeated Quintana by technical knockout in the fifth round. Following a punch to the body, Quintana surrendered prior to the start of the sixth round and Cotto won the vacant World Boxing Association Welterweight championship. This was also a major fight for Puerto Rican boxing fans, as both were quality performers who hit hard, and Quintana offered a chance for Puerto Rico to have another world champion, while Cotto was already being seen in the island and internationally, as a potential legend in the making.

Another major fight took place on Saturday, January 19, 2008, when Felix Trinidad Jr. attempted a return to boxing, against former multiple-times world champion Roy Jones Jr., in a fight that many fans and experts alike thought should have taken place nearly a decade before. Both legends took a long press conferences tour before the fight to garner fan interest for it. In an HBO Boxing Pay-Per-View event which was held at New York's Madison Square Garden, Jones dropped Trinidad twice and won by a twelve-rounds unanimous decision, in what constituted Trinidad's last boxing fight as a professional.

February 9, 2008, was the first time that boxers from Puerto Rico had held three of the four major welterweights titles (World Boxing Association, International Boxing Federation and World Boxing Organization) when Carlos Quintana defeated Paul Williams to become the WBO champion and join Miguel Cotto (WBA), and Kermit Cintron (IBF) as champions in the division.

2008 was also the year in which another chapter of the Puerto Rico-Mexico boxing rivalry was added, as the longly anticipated fight between Miguel Cotto, the WBA world welterweight champion, and Tijuana's Antonio Margarito, the former IBF and WBO champion, took place on July 26, 2008, at the MGM Grand Hotel in Las Vegas, Nevada, and it was telecast on HBO's Pay-Per-View. Cotto and Margarito fought one for the ages; many fans considered it a great fight. Cotto largely controlled the first half of the fight and was ahead on all the three judges' scorecards after six rounds, but Margarito came on in the second half and injured Cotto's face, leading to an eleventh-round technical knockout victory for the Mexican.

Soon after, however, doubts were cast over Margarito's win against Cotto. On his next contest, which was held on January 24, 2009, at the Staples Center in Los Angeles, California, Margarito got beaten by a ninth-round knockout by Shane Mosley to lose his welterweight title. Before that fight, one of Mosley's trainers, who was in Margarito's dressing room overseeing his hand-wrapping process, noticed a substance that looked like plaster of Paris, a cement-like element, near Margarito's hands. It was widely believed that Margarito used this on some of his previous fights, including the first Cotto one. The latter rumors were never confirmed, but they were enough to warrant their rematch later on.

== 2010s: Cotto, Garcia ==
The 2010s for Puerto Rican boxing began with John Ruiz's final attempt at recapturing a world heavyweight title. On Saturday, April 3, 2010, Ruiz faced the heavy-hitting, WBA world heavyweight champion David Haye for the Englishman's belt at the M.E.N. Arena in Manchester, England. Despite putting on a hard, valiant effort, Ruiz was stopped in nine rounds. He retired after this bout.

By the early 2010s, Puerto Rican boxing championship hopefuls included Danny Garcia and Jose Pedraza.

On April 18 and 19, 2010, an event took place in Venezuela that had little impact as far as boxing in Puerto Rico but set a chain of events that would affect a chapter of the Puerto Rico versus Mexico rivalry. On April 18, Venezuelan boxer Edwin Valero, a two-division world champion whose record was of 27–0, with all 27 wins by knockout, killed his wife in Valencia, Venezuela. Then on the 19th, he was found dead by suicide after hanging himself at a Venezuelan jail cell. Valero was widely expected to fight Manny Pacquiao in a super-fight next.

After Valero died, Pacquiao was left without an opponent, so Antonio Margarito stepped up and took the chance to fight the Filipino legend. Their fight took place on November 10, 2010, at the AT&T Stadium in Arlington, Texas, near Dallas. Margarito took a beating, lasting the twelve rounds distance but having an injury to his right eye socket and a fractured orbital bone, for which he was transported by ambulance to a nearby hospital after the bout, after losing the contest, which was for the WBC's vacant world Welterweight title, by a twelve-rounds unanimous decision.

Cotto had won the WBA's vacant world super-welterweight title by knocking out Yuri Foreman in nine rounds at the Yankee Stadium in the Bronx, New York on Saturday, June 5, 2010, in the first ever world title fight held at the new Yankee Stadium, on an HBO Boxing telecast show. Cotto next retained that title against Nicaraguan Ricardo Mayorga, winning by twelfth-round technical knockout on Saturday, March 12, 2011, at the MGM Grand Hotel in Las Vegas, Nevada, in a bout that was televised internationally; it was carried in Australia by the Main Event channel, in Hungary by Sport 2, in Mexico by Azteca TV, in Poland by Polsat Sport Extra and in the US, by the Showtime Network's Showtime Championship boxing.

The aforementioned events set in motion negotiations for a rematch between Cotto and Margarito. Many among the boxing fans and connoisseurs viewed this as a perfect moment for Cotto to avenge the earlier loss to Margarito which had been put in doubt due to the findings before Margarito's fight with Shane Mosley.

Their rematch took place on Saturday, December 3, 2011, at the Madison Square Garden in New York, despite initial reservations by the NYSAC to license the bout due to Margarito's eye condition. Bob Arum, the fight's promoter, threatened to take the fight to another state where Margarito was licensed to fight and hold it there. The commission had denied Margarito a license to box on October 31, 2011, due to that eye condition, but it ultimately licensed him and allowed the fight to take place. There was huge hype surrounding the contest; it was the subject of an HBO documentary series, "Cotto-Margarito: 24/7" which followed the two boxers during their training for the contest, and also of a "Face/Off" HBO television show, where both of them came face to face alongside host Max Kellerman and where both made claims about Margarito's hand wraps on their previous bout: Cotto had pictures of Margarito's wraps after it and alleged Margarito had used plaster of Paris on their first meeting, while Margarito and his trainer Javier Capetillo argued they were innocent. In any case, Cotto dominated the fight, widely leading on all three scorecards when it was stopped before round ten by doctors due to an injury to Margarito's eye, Cotto retaining the WBA world Junior Middleweight title by a ninth-round technical knockout.

Cotto's next contest was another major, Pay-Per-View production: he faced Floyd Mayweather Jr., widely considered among the greatest boxers of all time, on Saturday, May 5, 2012, at the MGM Grand in Las Vegas, defending his WBA world Junior Middleweight title and fighting for the WBC's vacant "silver" version of the same championship. In a highly competitive fight, Mayweather imposed himself by twelve-rounds unanimous decision.

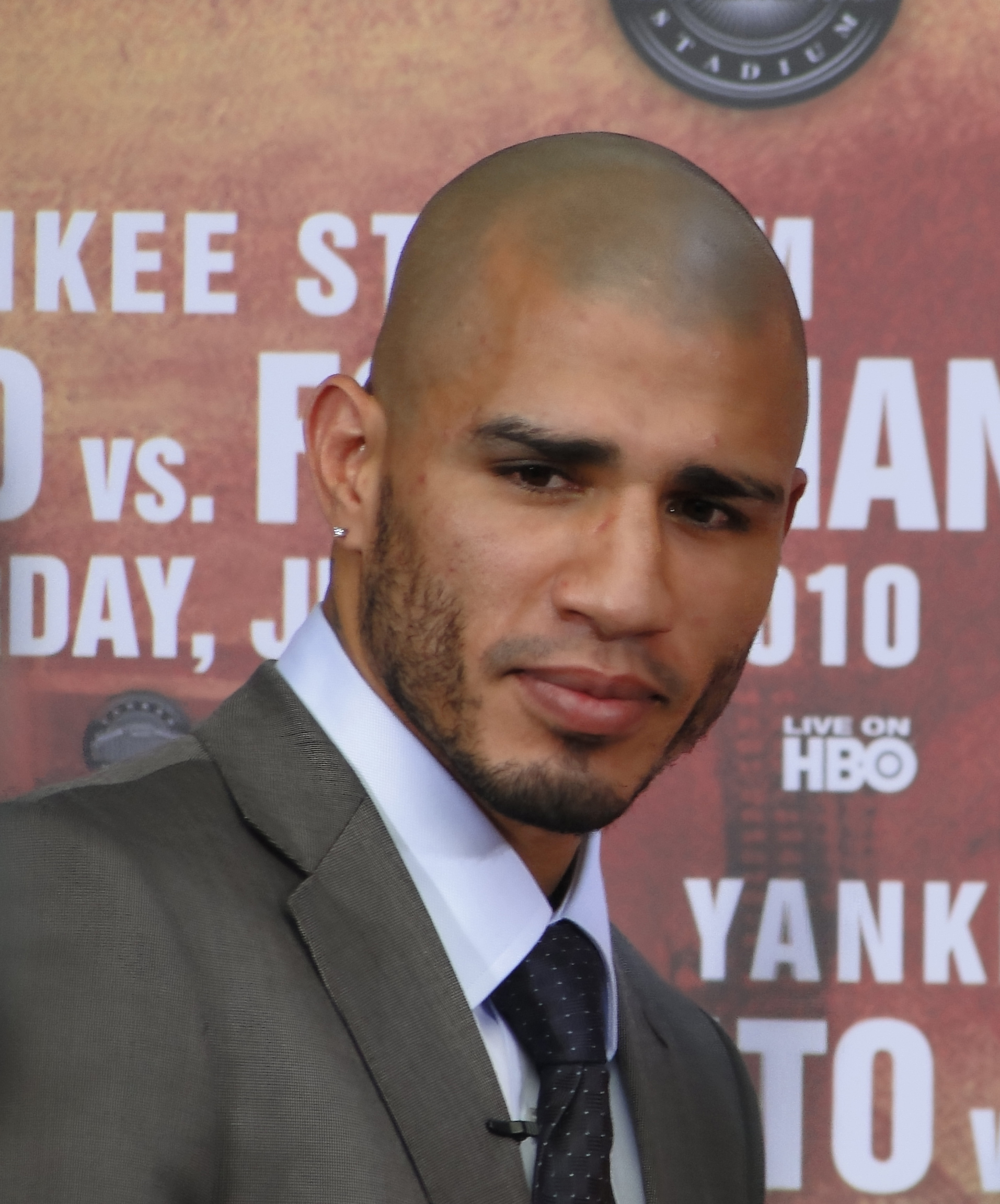
Miguel Cotto

Puerto Rican boxers who were modern stars during that era included Cotto as well as Garcia and Pedraza.

In 2012, Puerto Rican professional boxer Orlando Cruz made history by becoming the first professional boxer to come out as gay during his professional career. While other boxers, such as Panama Al Brown and Emile Griffith, had lived gay, bisexual or lesbian lives outside the ring, none of them had declared themselves members of the LGBT community while still boxing.

Garcia was another Puerto Rican-American (born in Philadelphia, Pennsylvania). Danny Óscar Garcia first won a world title when he defeated the legendary but shopworn Mexican, Erik Morales, by twelve-rounds unanimous decision in another fight in the long list of fights between Puerto Ricans or Puerto Rican-Americans and Mexicans or Mexican-Americans. The contest between Morales and Garcia, for the WBC's vacant world Junior-Welterweight title, was fought on Saturday, March 24, 2012, at the Reliant Arena in Houston, Texas. It was telecast to various countries, including Hungary, Australia, Mexico on Televisa and the United States on HBO. Garcia won by wide scores of 118–109, 117–110 and a closer 116–112 in his favor, after flooring Morales in round eleven.

On Saturday, July 14, 2012, Garcia added another important victory to his record when he stopped England's Amir Khan to win the WBA's "Super" version of the Junior Welterweight title, adding it to his WBC one, in four rounds at the Mandalay Bay Hotel and Casino in Las Vegas. Khan was floored once in round three and twice in round four before the bout was stopped. This contest was televised internationally to the United States on HBO, to Australia on Main Event and to Hungary on the Sport 1 channel.

Garcia and Morales would have a rematch, on Saturday, October 20, 2012, at the Barclay's Center in Brooklyn, New York. Garcia would retain his WBA and WBC titles by knocking out Morales in round four of the scheduled 12-rounds contest. This was Morales' last fight of his career of 61 fights, of which he had won 52, including victories over Puerto Ricans or boxers of Puerto Rican descent such as Kevin Kelley and Angel Chacon.

On November 20, 2012, an event that shook Puerto Rican society took place, when Puerto Rican boxing legend, former three-division world champion Hector Camacho was shot outside a bar in Bayamon, Puerto Rico, alongside a friend of his. Both men died, in Camacho's case, 4 days after the shooting took place.

Miguel Cotto, meanwhile, had one last super-fight win in his career. On Saturday, June 7, 2014, at the Madison Square Garden in New York, he stopped the legendary Argentine boxer Sergio Martinez to win the WBC world Middleweight title. Cotto dropped the valiant Argentine three times in round one before winning in round ten.

By this time, José Pedraza was starting to make waves in the world of professional boxing. On Saturday, June 13, 2015, at the Bartow Arena in Birmingham, Alabama, Pedraza won his first world title by outpointing Andrey Klimov over twelve-rounds for the IBF's vacant world Junior Lightweight championship. The fight was telecast in Panama and in the United States, in the latter country on the Showtime Network.

Christopher Diaz was another prospect during this time.

Miguel Cotto's last super-fight was also a chapter in the long history of the Puerto Rico-Mexico boxing rivalry: faced with Guadalajara's superstar, Saul "Canelo" Alvarez to defend his Ring Magazine-recognized world Middleweight title and fight for the vacant WBC one, on Saturday, November 21, 2015 (a date that has proven to be of poor luck to Puerto Ricans against Mexicans as Edwin Rosario had lost to Julio Cesar Chavez on the same date but in 1987) at the Mandalay Bay Events Center in Paradise, Nevada (near Las Vegas) Cotto lost by twelve-rounds unanimous decision in a contest that was scored widely in favor of Alvarez by all three judges but which experts, including those of ESPN, saw as a much closer affair albeit still favoring the Mexican. But while this was his last super-fight, it was not his last major one as he still had two world title fights ahead of him before retiring.

On Saturday, January 14, 2017, José Pedraza faced hard-hitting Gervonta Davis to defend his IBF world Junior-Lightweight belt. Pedraza put on a good fight against his undefeated challenger but ultimately wound up losing the world title by a seventh-round knockout. This bout, held at the Barclay's Center in Brooklyn, New York, was televised live to the United States on the Showtime Network as well as to Panama and the United Kingdom.

Saturday, March 4, 2017, marked another important date in Puerto Rican boxing history, as on that day, Danny Garcia faced Keith Thurman in a contest to unify Thurman's WBA and Garcia's WBC world Welterweight titles. This was the third fight in history to unify Welterweight titles, after 1981's Sugar Ray Leonard vs. Thomas Hearns and the aforementioned contest between Trinidad and De La Hoya. In a closely contested fight, Thurman was able to pull-out a split-decision victory over twelve-rounds at the Barclay Center in Brooklyn, New York.

On Saturday, August 26, 2017, Cotto dominated Japan's Yoshihiro Kamegai to win the vacant WBO world Super Welterweight Championship, by unanimous decision after twelve one-sided rounds at the StubHub Center in Carson, California, winning by scores of 120–108, 119–109 and 118–110, all in his favor. It would be the last win and championship of Cotto's-who had taken over from Felix Trinidad as the face of Puerto Rican boxing-career.

Pedraza and Raymundo Beltran ingrained themselves into the Mexico vs. Puerto Rico boxing rivalry's history when, on Saturday, August 25, 2018, they faced each other for Mexican Beltran's WBO world Lightweight title at the Gila River Arena in Glendale, Arizona, in the Phoenix Metropolitan Area. Pedraza became a two-division world champion when he dropped Beltran in round eleven and won by a twelve-rounds unanimous decision with two scores of 117–110 and one of 115–112 in his favor. The bout was televised nationally in the United States by ESPN.

December 2, 2017, marked Cotto's retirement date. On that night, he defended his WBO world Junior Middleweight title against Sadam Ali, at the Madison Square Garden in New York, in a fight that was televised to the United States on HBO Boxing and to Mexico on Televisa, as well as to other countries of Latin America on Canal Space. Cotto lost that fight by a close but unanimous decision, marking the end of his Hall of Fame career.

== 2020s ==
On May 9, 2022, five suspects, all men, were arrested in connection to the 2012 shooting death of Hector Camacho, the legendary Puerto Rican boxer. The police announced that two other suspects had been murdered themselves.

On Saturday, February 25, 2023, Subriel Matias of Ponce, Puerto Rico, lifted his professional boxing record to 19 wins and 1 loss, with all 19 wins coming by knockout, by stopping the until then undefeated Jeremias Ponce (30–0) to win the vacant IBF world Junior Welterweight championship at the Armory at Minneapolis, Minnesota. Matias thus won another world title for Puerto Rico and he represents a new promise for Puerto Rico's boxing scene. The bout was telecast live on Showtime Championship Boxing.

On June 14, 2024, Matias lost his title by a 12-rounds unanimous decision, to Liam Paro of Australia, at Manati, Puerto Rico.

== Women's boxing ==
On Saturday, September 12, 1998, Melissa Del Valle made double history, both as the first Puerto Rican woman to be crowned a world champion boxer and as a member of the first pair of Puerto Rican siblings who were world champions, along with her brother Lou Del Valle, when she beat Melinda Robinson to claim the vacant Women's International Boxing Federation's world Junior Lightweight title at the Miccosukee Indian Gaming Resort in Miami, Florida, by a ten-rounds unanimous decision. Del Valle's brother Lou had been the WBA's world Light-Heavyweight champion between 1997 and 1998, when he lost to Roy Jones Jr. by unanimous decision after dropping Jones Jr. in round seven. The Del Valle siblings missed being world champions concurrently by mere months.

On January 19, 2001, Ada Vélez made history by becoming the first native Puerto Rican woman (Melissa Del Valle was born in the United States) to win a world boxing championship when she beat Kathy Williams to win the International Boxing Association's women's world Bantamweight championship at the Soaring Eagle Casino in Mount Pleasant, Michigan. She won the fight by ten-rounds unanimous decision.

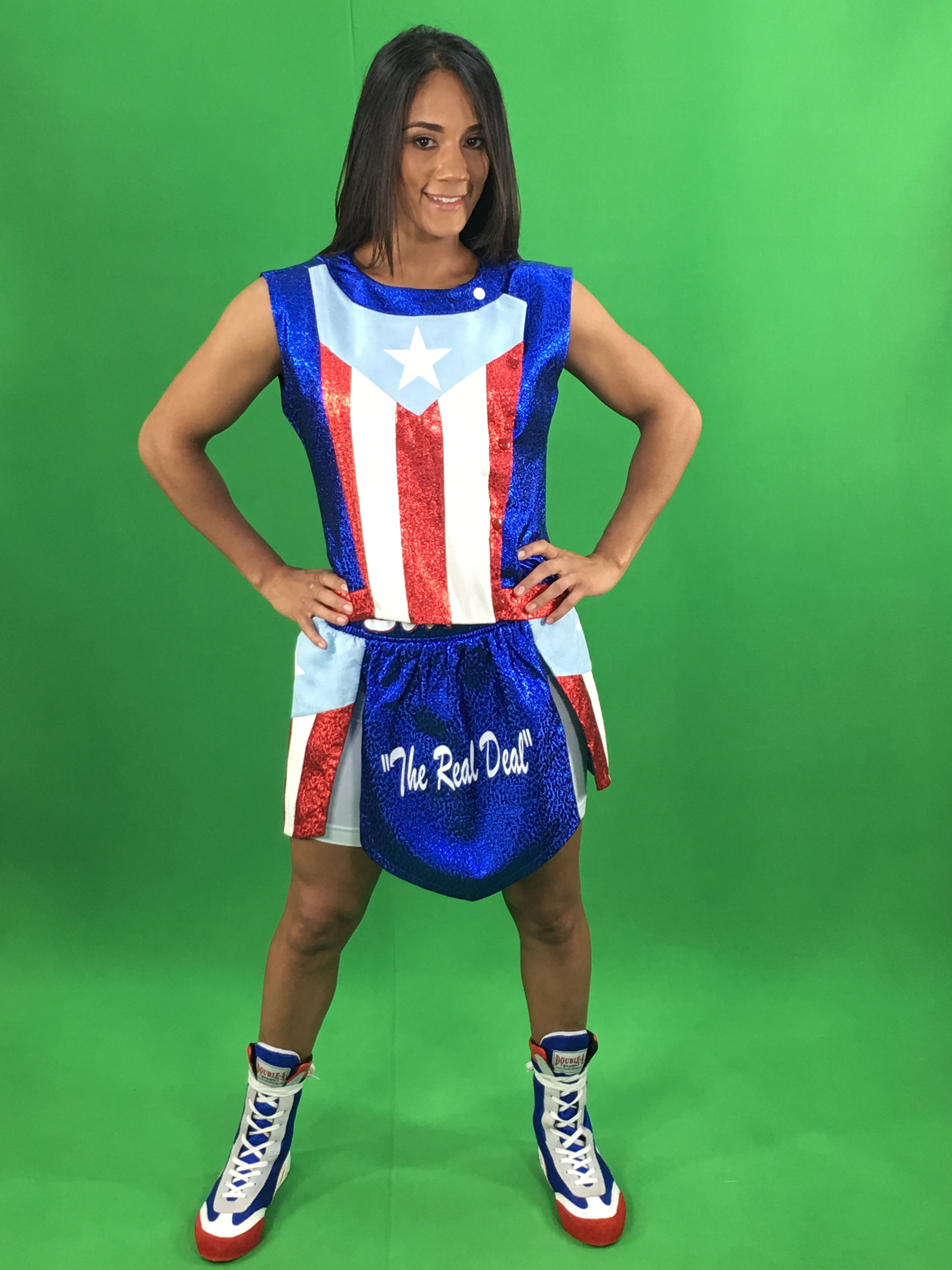
Amanda Serrano

By far the most accomplished Puerto Rican woman boxer until 2023 has been Amanda Serrano. Serrano, whose sister Cindy Serrano is also an accomplished boxer, fought at the Aviator Sports Complex in Brooklyn on Saturday, September 10, 2011, against Kimberly Connor of Waskom, Texas, for the IBF's vacant women's world Junior Lightweight title, and she lifted the championship by way of a second-round technical knockout. On Friday, April 27, 2012, Serrano fought Frida Wallberg for Wallberg's WBC women's world Lightweight title at the Cloetta Center in Linkoping, Sweden and lost by a close but unanimous ten-round decision.

On Saturday, February 16, 2013, Amanda Serrano boxed Wanda Pena Ozuna at the Gran Arena del Cibao in Santiago de los Caballeros, Dominican Republic. Serrano lifted the Women's International Boxing Association world Featherweight title, which was vacant until then, by a first-round knockout. Serrano added the WBO women's world lightweight title by defeating Maria Elena Maderna by a sixth-round knockout on Friday, August 15, 2014, in Buenos Aires, Argentina.

Serrano, who through her career has been able to move between weight divisions without much trouble, next went down to the Featherweight division again, and conquered the until then vacant WBO world Featherweight title by knocking out Olivia Gerula in round one on Wednesday, February 17, 2016, at the BB King Blues Club and Grill in New York City. Serrano went down yet one more weight division when she faced Alexandra Lazar of Hungary for the WBO's vacant women's world super-bantamweight title, and brought Puerto Rico another world title in that category (like Wilfredo Gomez, Victor Callejas and Wilfredo Vazquez before) at the Caribe Hilton Hotel in San Juan on Tuesday, October 18, 2016, knocking the European boxer out in round one to lift that belt.

A few months later, Serrano added the WBC Diamond version of their women's Super-Bantamweight title while at the same time successfully defending her WBO version of the world title, defeating Yazmin Rivas by ten-rounds unanimous decision as part of the aforementioned Davis-Pedraza fight's under program, at the Barclay's Center in Brooklyn.

On Saturday, April 22, 2017, Serrano went down in weight again and won the until then vacant WBO world Bantamweight title by beating the Dominican Republic's Dahianna Santana by an eighth-round technical knockout at the Barclay's Center in Brooklyn. The title was on the line for Serrano only as Santana had come into the bout over the fight's weight limit.

Continuing her title-winning ways, Serrano fought Yamila Esther Reynoso of Argentina for the WBO's vacant women's world Junior-Welterweight title on Saturday, September 8, 2018, at the Barclay's Center. Serrano won the title by a ten-rounds unanimous decision win.

For her next bout after the Reynoso contest, Serrano lost some thirty pounds to compete in the Super-Flyweight division, where she faced Eva Voraberger of Austria for the WBO's vacant world title on Friday, January 18, 2019, at the Madison Square Garden in New York City. Serrano won the title by a first-round knockout. Serrano only took 35 seconds to win this bout.

Serrano kept collecting titles (and retaining one of them) when she next boxed Heather Hardy on Friday, September 19, 2019, at the Madison Square Garden's Theater in New York City, retaining her WBO women's world Featherweight title and winning the WBC's interim one, by a ten-rounds unanimous decision victory, with two scores of 98–91 and one of 98–92, all for her.

On Thursday, March 21, 2021, Serrano defeated Argentina's Daniela Bermudez at the Plaza del Quinto Centenario in San Juan to retain her WBC and WBO women's world Featherweight titles and add the IBO's one, which was vacant, by a ninth-round knockout.

On Saturday, April 30, 2022, Serrano fought her biggest fight to date, when she faced Irish superstar Katie Taylor in a fight for the WBA, WBC, WBO and IBF world Lightweight titles, in what is considered one of the biggest fights in women's boxing history. Serrano lost the fight by a very close, ten-rounds split decision with scores of 93–97 and 94–96 against her and a 96–93 for her. The bout, held at the Madison Square Garden in New York City, was promoted by Eddie Hearn.

The pair net in a rematch during the Jake Paul vs. Mike Tyson match's undercard on November 15, 2024, with Taylor winning a ten-rounds unanimous decision by three scores of 95–94 each, in a scoring that was deemed controversial even by Irish (Taylor is Irish) press outlets such as the Irish Star newspaper.

As of late 2024, Serrano had a record of 47 wins and 3 losses in 47 tests, with 31 wins by knockout and no losses that way.

Melissa Hernandez, a boxer who has fought in places such as Australia, Canada and Panama, became the fourth Puerto Rican woman to win a world title when she defeated WBC women's world Featherweight champion Jelena Mrdjenovic by a ten-rounds unanimous decision on Friday, September 14, 2012, at the Shaw Conference Centre in Edmonton, Canada. Hernandez is from the western Puerto Rico city of Mayaguez. A former resident of New York City, she later resided in Miami Beach, Florida.

Cindy Serrano became the fifth Puerto Rican female world champion boxer, and, at the same time, half of the first pair of Puerto Rican sisters and second pair of Puerto Rican siblings to be world champions along with her sister Amanda. Cindy Serrano won the Universal Boxing Federation's world Junior Lightweight title when she beat Grecia Novas Mateo for the vacant belt on Friday, May 10, 2013, at the Carlos Cruz Coliseum in Santo Domingo, Dominican Republic, by a first-round knockout.

== Amateurs ==
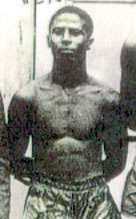
Juan Evangelista Venegas

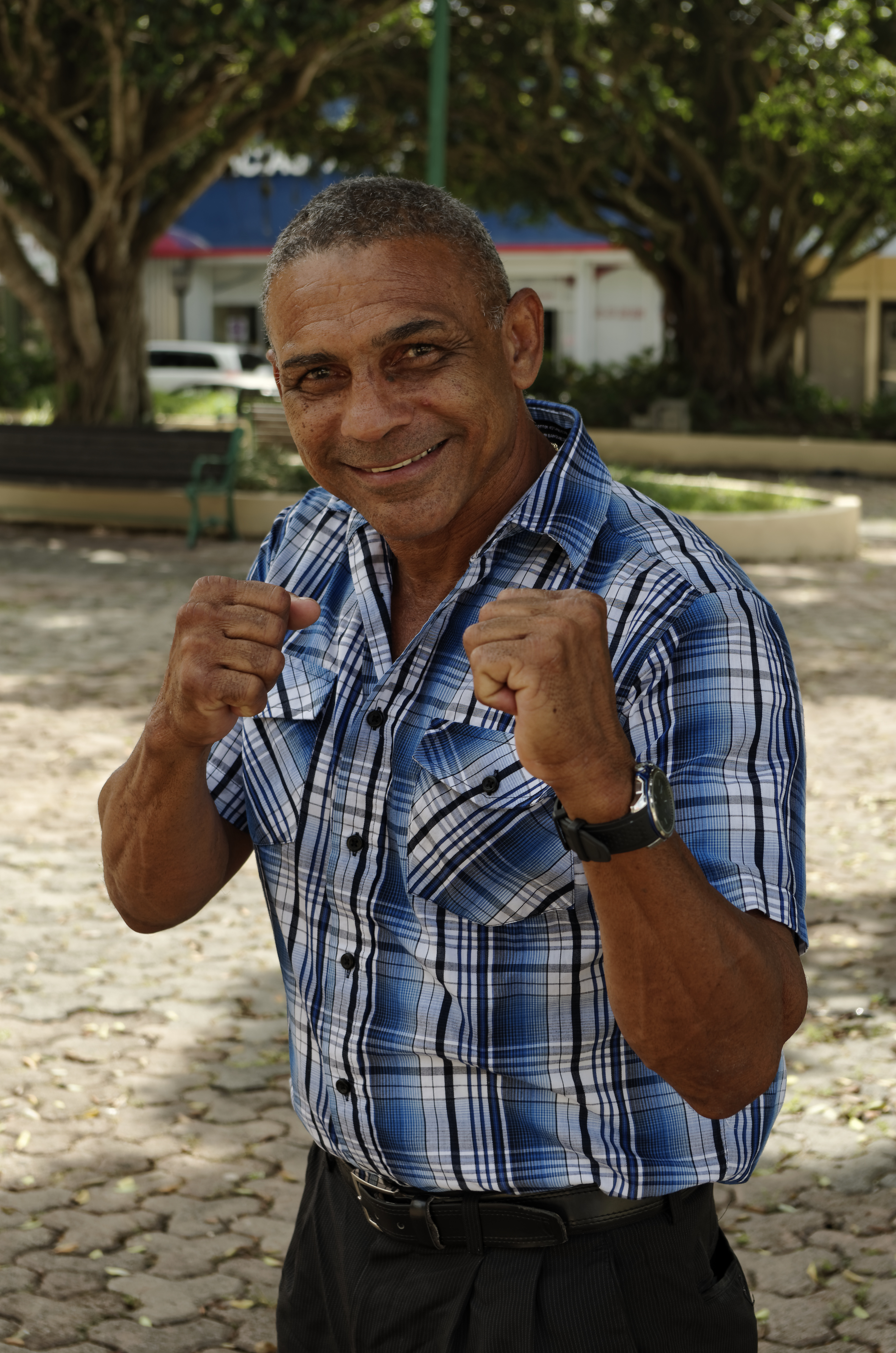
Alberto Mercado poses in Cayey, Puerto Rico in 2015.

Various Puerto Ricans have won medals at different amateur boxing competitions, both for the island and for other countries. In 1948 at the 1948 Summer Olympic Games in London, England, boxer Juan Evangelista Venegas became the first ever Olympic medalist for Puerto Rico, winning a bronze medal in boxing. He won in the Bantamweight division.

José Torres of Ponce fought for the United States in the 1956 Summer Olympics at Melbourne as a middleweight. He lost to László Papp of Hungary in the finals but secured a silver medal. Torres, who reportedly did not support the Puerto Rican statehood (with the United States) status, had nevertheless moved to the United States prior to those games and he was serving in the United States Army; therefore, he had to represent that country instead of Puerto Rico.

In 1976, the then-17-year-old Puerto Rican, Orlando Maldonado, secured a bronze medal at the Light-Flyweight boxing competition of the 1976 Summer Olympics in Montreal, Canada, the second Puerto Rican Olympic medal, both, until then, bronzes in boxing. Maldonado went on to have a highly competitive professional boxing career, where he once challenged for a world title.

In 1978, Alberto Mercado of Cayey represented Puerto Rico at the 1978 Central American and Caribbean Games held at Colombia. He won gold at these games and participated in a world cup tournament. Hoping to become the first Puerto Rican ever to win a gold medal at an Olympic Games, Mercado moved to Cuba periodically; there he trained hard towards that goal.

Mercado, who, like Torres, did not like the idea of statehood for Puerto Rico, was one of only three American citizens to participate in the 1980 Olympics celebrated in Moscow, Soviet Union, bearing the flag of and competing in boxing for Puerto Rico after having won the gold medal at the 1979 Pan American Games. The other two were also representatives from Puerto Rico and boxers: Luis Pizarro and José Angel Molina. Competing as a flyweight, Mercado lost to future professional world champion Gilberto Roman of Mexico in the competition's round of 16. Mercado went on to have a very productive career as a professional boxer.

1984 proved to be a historic year for Puerto Rican amateur boxing: at that year's summer Olympics in Los Angeles, California, boxer Luis Ortiz, competing at the Lightweight division, became the first Puerto Rican ever to win a silver medal at an Olympic competition (Monica Puig, a tennis player, became the first Puerto Rican to win a gold medal, 32 years later) and his teammate Arístides González, who fought as a Middleweight, won a bronze medal, to also achieve the first time Puerto Rico won two medals at the same Olympic competition, a feat later repeated only by Javier Culson and Jaime Espinal during the competition 28 years later.

Aníbal Santiago Acevedo was also a highly-successful amateur boxer from Puerto Rico. In 1992, at the 1992 Summer Olympics in Barcelona, Spain, he became the nation's only medalist by taking home a bronze medal. Acevedo boxed at Welterweight. He had also won a bronze medal at the 1991 Pan American Games in Havana, Cuba. Santiago Acevedo also attempted a professional boxing career, but he retired from that with a humble record.

Daniel Santos was also a highly decorated amateur boxer. He won a bronze medal at the 1994 Goodwill Games in Saint Petersburg, Russia, a silver medal at the 1995 Pan American Games in Mar del Plata, Argentina, and another bronze medal, at the 1996 Olympic Games in Atlanta, Georgia, at Welterweight. As of 2023, Santos' bronze at the 1996 Olympics has been the last Olympic medal Puerto Rico has gained in boxing. Santos went on to become the first Olympic medalist from Puerto Rico to win a professional world boxing title.

In 2023, Ashleyann Lozada made history by becoming the first Puerto Rican woman to qualify for an Olympic Games women's boxing competition. She did so by securing a bronze medal at the 2023 Pan American Games in Santiago, Chile and competed at the 2024 Summer Olympics in Paris, France, advancing to the second round, where she lost. Lozada, from San Juan, is a featherweight. She beat Canada's Marie-bathoul Al-Ahmadieh, by a 5–0 unanimous decision, to secure the only medal Puerto Rico garnered at boxing in the Chilean games.

== International Boxing Hall of Fame members ==
There are 14 Puerto Ricans in the International Boxing Hall of Fame, all of them men. Here is a list of Puerto Ricans who are in that hall of fame:

Puerto Ricans in the International Boxing Hall of Fame

Number	Name	Year inducted	Notes
1	Carlos Ortíz	1991	World Jr. Welterweight Champion 1959 June 12- 1960, September 1, WBA Lightweight Champion 1962 Apr 21 – 1965 Apr 10, WBC Lightweight Champion 1963 Apr 7 – 1965 Apr 10, WBC Lightweight Champion 1965 Nov 13 – 1968 Jun 29.
2	Wilfred Benítez	1994	The youngest world champion in boxing history. WBA Light Welterweight Champion 1976 Mar 6 – 1977, WBC Welterweight Champion 1979 Jan 14 – 1979 Nov 30, WBC Light Middleweight Champion.
3	Wilfredo Gómez	1995	WBC Super Bantamweight Champion 1977 May 21 – 1983, WBC Featherweight Champion 1984 Mar 31 – 1984 Dec 8, WBA Super Featherweight Champion 1985 May 19 – 1986 May 24.
4	José "Chegui" Torres	1997	Won a silver medal in the junior middleweight at the 1956 Olympic Games. Undisputed Light Heavyweight Champion 1965 Mar 30 – 1966 Dec 16
5	Sixto Escobar	2002	Puerto Rico's first boxing champion. World Bantamweight Champion 15 Nov 1935– 23 Sep 1937, World Bantamweight Champion 20 Feb 1938– Oct 1939
6	Edwin Rosario	2006	Ranks #36 on the list of "100 Greatest Punchers of All Time." according to Ring Magazine. WBC Lightweight Champion 1983 May 1 – 1984 Nov 3, WBA Lightweight Champion 1986 Sep 26 – 1987 Nov 21, WBA Lightweight Champion 199 Jul 9 – 1990 Apr 4, WBA Light Welterweight Champion 1991 Jun 14 – 1992 Apr 10.
7	Pedro Montañez	2007	92 wins out of 103 fights. Never held a title.
8	Joe Cortez	2011	The first Puerto Rican boxing referee to be inducted into the Boxing Hall of Fame
9	Herbert "Cocoa Kid" Hardwick	2012	Member of boxing's "Black Murderers' Row". World Colored Welterweight Championship - June 11, 1937 to August 22, 1938; World Colored Middleweight Championship - January 11, 1940 until the title went extinct in the 1940s; World Colored Middleweight Championship - January 15, 1943 until the title went extinct in the 1940s
10	Félix "Tito" Trinidad	2014	Captured the IBF welterweight crown in his 20th pro bout. Won the WBA light middleweight title from David Reid in March 2000 and later that year unified titles with a 12th-round knockout against IBF champ Fernando Vargas. In 2001 became a three-division champion.
11	Héctor "Macho" Camacho	2016	First boxer to be recognized as a septuple champion in history (counting championships from minor sanctioning bodies). WBC Super Featherweight Championship - August 7, 1983 – 1984, WBC Lightweight Championship - August 10, 1985 – 1987, WBO Light Welterweight Champion - March 6, 1989 – February 23, 1991, WBO Light Welterweight Champion - May 18, 1991–1992.
12	Mario Rivera Martino	2019	First Puerto Rican boxing sports writer to be inducted into the International Boxing Hall of Fame. He served Puerto Rican boxing for more than 50 years as a writer and eventual commissioner.
13	Miguel Cotto	2022	He is a multiple-time world champion, and the first Puerto Rican boxer to win world titles in four weight classes, from light welterweight to middleweight. In 2007 and 2009,

= Indicates the person is no longer alive

== See also ==
- List of Puerto Rican boxing world champions
