= Boxing in Mexico =

Boxing in Mexico is one of the most popular sports in the country, with a tradition dating back to the 19th century. It is practiced both amateur and professionally. At the professional level, it has more than 170 world champions, making it the country with the second most world champions, behind only the United States. It has also participated in the Olympic Games. In total, Mexico has won 14 medals, of which two are gold, four are silver, and eight are bronze.

Throughout the history of boxing, Mexico has been locked in a rivalry with Puerto Rico, which intensified beginning in the 1970s. Both nations have two of the most important boxing schools, whose boxers have starred in numerous lightweight title fights.

== History ==
=== Origins ===
The first record of boxing in Mexico dates back to 1868, when American Colonel Thomas Hoyer Monstery established a combat school that offered classes in fencing, foil, saber, bayonet, knife, and boxing. In 1869, Monstery challenged Frenchman Nicolas Poupard to a fencing duel and a boxing exhibition. This event generated great excitement among the military and the invited public, filling Monstery's academy. Years later, in 1895, the governor of the State of Hidalgo, Rafael Cravioto, authorized a boxing match in the state, with the aim of resolving disputes without resorting to weapons.

=== Prohibition and resurgence ===
At the beginning of the 20th century, boxing grew in popularity despite being banned by the government. The Mexican Revolution, which began in 1910, limited sports activities, resulting in a 10-year hiatus in the sport's development in the country. In the 1920s, sports centers reopened and national championships were organized, where foreign boxers, especially Americans, competed for the Mexican national title. In 1923, the Mexico City Boxing Commission was established, stipulating that national champions must be Mexican by birth.

In 1924, Narciso "Chicho" Cisneros became the first Mexican to be internationally ranked at featherweight by The Ring magazine, achieving double national bantamweight and featherweight champion status.

==== Beginnings of women's boxing ====
Margarita Montes, known as "La Maya," is considered the pioneer of women's boxing in Mexico. Before becoming a boxer, she explored other sports such as bullfighting and baseball, but it was boxing that she focused on. Of her 33 fights, only 5 were against female opponents. However, her career in women's boxing faced obstacles due to laws prohibiting women from practicing the sport at the time. These restrictions ultimately put an end to women's boxing in the 1930s.

== "Mexican style" ==
The "Mexican style" (estilo mexicano) is defined by some experts such as former boxer and boxing hall of famer Juan Manuel Márquez as: a boxer with an orthodox stance, constant pressure, aggressiveness, body punching and a willingness to exchange blows. Not all Mexican boxers use the same style; some, like Saúl "Canelo" Álvarez (a renowned counterpuncher), have opposed this view, arguing that the "Mexican style" does not exist.

== Boxers on the list of the 50 best ==
In June 1996, The Ring published a special edition analyzing the 50 best boxers of the last 50 years. Seven Mexicans appeared on this list: Julio César Chávez (6th), Carlos Zárate (11th), José "Mantequilla" Nápoles (15th), Rubén Olivares (18th), Salvador Sánchez (26th), Miguel Canto (34th), and Vicente Saldivar (50th).

In 2007, ESPN made a ranking of the 50 best boxers of all time, which included five Mexicans: Chávez (24th), Nápoles (32nd), Olivares (33rd), Marco Antonio Barrera (43rd) and Erik "El Terrible" Morales (49th).

== See also ==
- List of Mexican boxing world champions
