= Ivonne Class =

Puerto Rican theater producer, former broadcaster and boxing promoter

- Occupations: Boxing promoter, sports broadcaster, concert and theatrical producer,
- Spouse: Marisol Calero (divorced 2021)

Ivonne Class is a Puerto Rican theater producer. She is also a former boxing promoter and sportscaster. After the 2021 death of actress Myraida Chaves, Class is the director of the Centro de Bellas Artes de Caguas in the central Puerto Rican city of Caguas.

== Biography ==
By the 1980s, the young Class was well known to fans of boxing in Puerto Rico as a promoter and broadcaster. She was the first woman to be licensed as a promoter in the country. In 1985, she worked alongside Puerto Rican boxing legend Wilfredo Gomez in the coverage, from Rimini, Italy, for WAPA-TV, of a boxing fight, the rematch between Victor Callejas and Loris Stecca, a fight won by Callejas by a sixth-round technical knockout to retain his World Boxing Association's world Super-Bantamweight title.

By 1986, she had moved on to WAPA's rival, Channel 11, where she started to promote fights with her "Video-Deportes" promotional company and broadcast them herself along with the legendary Cuban sportscaster Felo Ramirez. Class and Ramirez broadcast boxing fights on that channel for many years.

Later on, Class dedicated herself to producing musical concerts in Puerto Rico. One such instance was during 2010, when she organized a Chucho Avellanet and Lissette Álvarez concert in Puerto Rico; it ended with controversy, allegedly because Puerto Rico TV, also known in the island as Canal 6, according to Class, had recorded a portion of the concert and asked Class to pay them $20,000 dollars for the portion they had recorded.

Class' concert promoting company is named San Juan Family Group.

During 2021, after her countrywoman, actress and show host Myraida Chaves, was diagnosed with Cancer, Class was named interim director of the Centro de Bellas Artes in Caguas. After Chaves died of the disease, Class inherited the directorship of the center as she officially became the full director of it. Class then became involved in bringing different acts such as theatrical plays to the center.

== Personal life ==
Class was married to Puerto Rican actress Marisol Calero. Calero suffered a stroke during 2020,

During 2021, the couple divorced.

Class identifies herself as a Christian.

== See also ==
- List of Puerto Ricans
- Dommys Delgado Berty
