= Victor Callejas =

Puerto Rican boxer

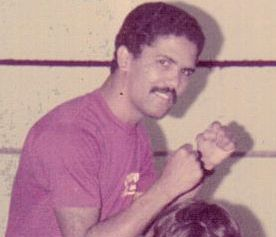
- Luvi Callejas

Personal information
- Nickname: Luvi
- Nationality: Puerto Rican
- Born: Victor Callejas; November 12, 1960 (age 65) Guaynabo, Puerto Rico
- Height: 5 ft 6 in (168 cm)
- Weight: Super bantamweight

Boxing career

Boxing record
- Total fights: 31
- Wins: 27
- Win by KO: 22
- Losses: 3
- No contests: 1

Victor Callejas (born November 12, 1960) is a Puerto Rican former boxer who was world Junior Featherweight champion.

== Early history ==
Callejas compiled a record of 36 wins and 4 defeats as an amateur boxer, and in 1979, he decided to turn professional. That he did on the night of February 18 of that year. In his first bout, Callejas, like Henry Armstrong, Rafael Marquez, Chucho Castillo and Wilfredo Vazquez, lost. He was beaten by Jose Parrilla by a decision in four rounds. For his next three bouts, he travelled around some of the other Caribbean islands, gaining revenge over Parrilla in St. Croix for his first professional win, knocking out Wilt Jones in one round in St. Marteen for his first knockout and beating Albert Pagan, also by a knockout, in five.

== Professional boxing career ==
Between the fight against Jones and the fight versus Jose Ortiz in 1983, Callejas had a streak of 15 knockout wins in a row, winning Puerto Rico's Jr. Featherweight title and earning a ranking among the world's top Jr. Featherweights with the WBA along the way. Some fans even started to call him the next Wilfredo Gómez. His fight with Ortiz ended in a second round no-contest. But after that, on May 7 of '83, he beat Juan Arenade Balzan by a knockout in three, and then, on February 15 of 1984, he beat the WBA's number one challenger, Bernardo Checa, by a knockout in three in Guaynabo. That same night, but in Milan, Italian boxer Loris Stecca was becoming the new Jr. Featherweight champion of the world when he beat Leo Cruz by a knockout in round 12 for the WBA title.

External audio
- You may watch Victor "Luvi" Callejas vs Loris Stecca here

On May of that year, Stecca went to Puerto Rico to defend his title against Callejas. On May 26, Callejas became world champion by knocking Stecca out in round eight. Callejas then began to face different problems to fight, and it was almost a year later that he could finally defend his title for the first time, when he beat future IBF super bantamweight champion Seung-Hoon Lee by a decision in 15 on February 2, 1985, after dropping him in round 2, at the Roberto Clemente Coliseum in San Juan.

Stecca had won five fights in a row since losing to Callejas, all by knockout. So the logical next step was for a rematch to take place. The second time around, it was Callejas who had to travel to his rival's home turf, and so Callejas went to Italy, where he complained about such pre-fight conditions as the heating system in his hotel room and the gestures made towards him by some Stecca fans he met on the streets. Callejas-Stecca 2 took place on November 8 in Rimini, with Gómez himself and Ivonne Class broadcasting the fight for Puerto Rican TV. During round four of the rematch, the lights went off the sports facility where the fight was held at, and the fighters had to keep boxing under a complete obscurity. But in round six, Callejas retained the title with a highlight film knockout: He connected with a left hand that lifted Stecca off his feet, and when Stecca came down, he landed on his knees, his upper body over his lower legs. He got up, but was saved by the bell and not allowed to continue for round seven by his corner. This Callejas knockout earned many knockout of the year awards.

Callejas would not fight again for two years. Many reasons were given for this, including managerial and weight making problems. But when he came back in 1987, he won fights over contenders Cleo Garcia (by decision in 10) and Nivio Nolasco (knockout in one), the latter of which marked Callejas' Las Vegas debut. Callejas was given an opportunity by the WBC to fight for another world title in 1988, and so he travelled to Australia, where he met Jeff Fenech on March 7, losing by a knockout in ten for the vacant WBC's world Featherweight title.

Later that year, Callejas did a two fight tour of the United Kingdom, beating Juan Torres Odelin by a knockout in seven in Belfast, Northern Ireland, and Brian Roche by a decision in eight in London.

== Retirement ==
In his last fight as a professional, Callejas lost to Francisco Alvarez by a decision in eight at San Juan. Callejas later held an important position in a government sports department in Puerto Rico. He had a professional boxing record of 27 wins, 3 losses and 1 no-contest, with 22 wins by knockout.

On March 2, 2022, news surfaced that Callejas and other people had helped save former world boxing champion Wilfredo Gomez from "deplorable" living conditions at Gomez's house in San Juan. Once considered "the next Wilfredo Gomez" by press and fans alike, Callejas was by then friends with his former idol

== See also ==
- List of Puerto Ricans
- List of Puerto Rican boxing world champions
- List of super-bantamweight boxing champions
- Dommys Delgado Berty
- Boxing in Puerto Rico

Achievements
Preceded by Loris Stecca	WBA Super Bantamweight Champion; May 26, 1984 - November 21, 1986; Stripped	Vacant Title next held by Louie Espinoza
