= Dommys Delgado Berty =

Puerto Rican sports administrator

- Born: The Bronx, New York City, United States
- Other name: Dommys Lourdes Delgado Berty
- Occupation: Sports administrator
- Years active: 1980s-2017
- Title: President of the Puerto Rican Boxing Commission
- Term: 1995-
- Awards: Rio Piedras municipal Sports Hall of Fame (2000)

Dommys Lourdes Delgado Berty is a Puerto Rican sports administrator. She was the president of the Puerto Rican Boxing Commission, becoming, in 1995, the first woman in history to be president of a national boxing commission, a fact that was recognized by the Guinness Book of World Records. Delgado Berty kept working in the sport of professional boxing until 2017.

== Early life ==
Delgado Berty was born in the New York borough of The Bronx, to a Puerto Rican family that included her father Manuel Delgado, mother Esther Berty and eight brothers. Her grandfather, Zenen Flores, was one of the trainers of Puerto Rico's first world boxing champion, Sixto Escobar. At the age of eight, the Delgado-Berty family returned to Puerto Rico, moving to Residencial Manuel A. Perez, an extremely impoverished area in Rio Piedras, San Juan, Puerto Rico.

Delgado Berty graduated high school; she then moved to Louisiana and got married, returning to Puerto Rico to complete college courses and become a medical secretary.

== Sports administrator career ==
In 1989, Leonardo Gonzalez, the then secretary of the country's Department of Sports and Recreation, named Delgado Berty executive director of the Puerto Rican Boxing Commission, thus Delgado Berty became the first woman to hold that position.

In 1993, the World Boxing Council recognized Delgady Berty with their "Lady of the Year" award and she was presented with it at a ceremony held in Las Vegas, Nevada, by then WBC president, Mexican José Sulaiman.

That same year, on October 29 at Zaragoza, Spain, Delgado Berty supervised a world championship bout for the first time, when she was the supervisor in charge of the World Boxing Organization's world Super-Bantamweight championship contest between her countryman, Daniel Jimenez and Spain's Felix Garcia Losada, in a test won by her countryman Jimenez by a fifth-round technical knockout. Between 1993 and 1997, Delgado Berty supervised five world championship fights, all WBO ones. She traveled to Spain and Mexico in her condition as a supervisor. These fights included one of her countryman Alex Sanchez, who beat Arturo Mayan by first-round knockout on January 7, 1994, at Palma de Mallorca to retain his WBO world Minimumweight title, with Delgado Berty at ringside. The last time Delgado Berty acted as a supervisor was on a contest for the WBO world Flyweight title, between champion, Argentina's Carlos Salazar and challenger, Mexico's Antonio Ruiz, a fight held at the Parque de Beisbol Ferrocarill in Mexicali, Baja California, Mexico, on March 8, 1997, a bout in which Salazar retained his title by a twelve-rounds draw (tie).

In 1999, Delgado Berty was selected as the Department of Sports and Recreation's Commissioner of the Millennium, and she was recognized as such during an event honoring Puerto Rico's best boxers and professional wrestlers for the previous year.

During 2011, there was a controversy concerning Delgado Berty's presidency: Henry Neumann, the then secretary of the Department of Sports and Recreation, was shocked to find an information apparently provided by Rodolfo Gonzalez, the Puerto Rican Boxing Commission's executive director, who reportedly announced that Delgado Berty would be replaced as president by former World Boxing Association world Super-Bantamweight champion Victor Callejas, who by that time was the commissioner of the office of the representative of the WBA in Puerto Rico. Delgado Berty at the moment was in Las Vegas to watch the fight between her countryman, Miguel Cotto, and Nicaragua's Ricardo Mayorga, a fight which Cotto won by a twelfth-round technical knockout. Delgado Berty continued as president, but Callejas indeed substituted her in that charge, when he was named to it by then-Puerto Rican governor Ricardo Rossello during 2017.

Delgado Berty ended up supervising 100 boxing shows. In 2000, she was inducted into the Rio Piedras municipal Sports Hall of Fame.

=== Orlando Cruz ===
When Puerto Rican professional boxer Orlando Cruz became the first professional boxer to come out as homosexual during his career, Delgado Berty was one of the first people to publicly congratulate him and express her support to him. "Orlando has proven an excellent boxer with very good chances of becoming a world champion. We do know that it (boxing) is a very macho sport. (To) Those who don't want to fight with him, well, don't fight (him, then)!", she declared.

== Personal life ==
She has three daughters (Dommys, Gliiza and Osear) and one son (Wilbert). Wilbert was a professional baseball player who once played on a San Diego Padres double-A affiliate team and for the Indios de Mayaguez baseball team in the Puerto Rican Professional Baseball League.

== See also ==
- List of Puerto Ricans
- Ivonne Class - the first Puerto Rican woman to be a boxing promoter
- History of women in Puerto Rico
