= Loris Stecca =

Italian boxer (born 1960)

Personal information
- Nationality: Italian
- Born: Loris Stecca; 30 March 1960 (age 66) Santarcangelo di Romagna, Italy
- Height: 5 ft 5 1/2 in (166 cm)
- Weight: Super bantamweight; Featherweight

Boxing career
- Stance: Orthodox

Boxing record
- Total fights: 59
- Wins: 55
- Win by KO: 37
- Losses: 2
- Draws: 2

Loris Stecca (born 30 March 1960) is an Italian former world champion boxer. He is the older brother of former featherweight world champion of boxing, and 1984 olympic bantamweight champion Maurizio Stecca.

== Professional career ==
Stecca held the WBA super bantamweight title for three months in 1984. He defeated Leo Cruz to win the title by twelfth round knockout, then lost it to Victor Callejas by a knockout in round eight at Mario Morales coliseum, then known as Mets Pavilion, Guaynabo, Puerto Rico.

Stecca won five fights in a row, all by knockout, putting himself on title contention once again. In a rematch with Callejas, held in November 1985 in Rimini, Italy, however, he lost by a sixth round knockout. Ahead on the scorecards, Stecca received a punch that lifted him off the floor, sending him to the air before he landed on his knees. He got up, but his corner soon stopped the fight, and the punch made the highlights of many sports news shows.

== Amateur career ==
Stecca was the 1979 Italian Featherweight Champion.

== Attempted murder ==
Stecca was sentenced on 2 June 2015 to eight years in jail for the attempted murder of business partner Roberta Cester who was allegedly stabbed by the former world champion boxer during a 2013 gym confrontation.

Achievements
Preceded by Leo Cruz	WBA Super Bantamweight Champion; February 22, 1984 - May 26, 1984	Succeeded by Victor Callejas
