= Mexico–Puerto Rico boxing rivalry =

Boxing competition

The rivalry between Puerto Rican and Mexican boxers is recognized as one of the most intense in boxing history. Originating in 1934, this rivalry has been watched by fans across multiple generations. Over the years, both nations have raised numerous fighters who have competed in boxing matches against each other including Julio Cesar Chavez, Felix Trinidad, Oscar De La Hoya, Miguel Cotto, and Hector Camacho. It has said to have started when Sixto Escobar became the first Puerto Rican champion by knocking out Mexican champion Rodolfo "Baby" Casanova.

In world title matches, Puerto Rican boxers hold a slight statistical advantage over their Mexican rivals, with Puerto Rico achieving 86 wins compared to Mexico with 77 wins. The most recent matchup resulted in Abraham Perez defeating Puerto Rico’s Nestor Bravo for Mexico’s 77th win in the rivalry.

== Most Recent Championship Fights Puerto Rico vs. Mexico ==
Date	Winner	Opponent	Result	Title	Winning Side
2026-11-07	Abraham Perez	Yankiel Rivera	UD12	WBA interim 112	Mexico 77-86
2026-09-19	Isaac Cruz	Nestor Bravo	KO6	WBC interim 140	Mexico 76-86
2026-06-20	Oscar Collazo	Neider Valdez	TKO2	WBA WBO RING	Puerto Rico 86-74
2026-06-14	Abraham Perez	Jonathan Gonzalez	SD12	WBA interim 112	Mexico 75-85
2026-03-14	Oscar Collazo	Jesus Haro	RTD6	WBA WBO RING	Puerto Rico 85-74
2025-07-27	Eduardo Núñez	Christopher Diaz	UD12	IBF 126	Mexico 74-84
2025-07-27	Xander Zayas	Jorge Garcia	UD12	WBO 154	Puerto Rico 84-73
2025-03-29	Oscar Collazo	Edwin Cano	KO5	WBA, WBO, The Ring 105	Puerto Rico 83-73
2024-09-14	Canelo Alvarez	Edgar Berlanga	UD12	Undisputed 168	Mexico 73-82
2021-07-21	Jonathan González	Elwin Soto	TKO5	WBO 108	Puerto Rico 82-72
2021-04-24	Emanuel Navarrete	Christopher Diaz	TKO12	WBO 126	Mexico 72-81
2021-07-21	McWilliams Arroyo	Abraham Rodriguez	SD12	WBC 112	Puerto Rico 81-71

== In pop culture ==
The Super Bowl LX Halftime Show featured two boxers, Xander Zayas and Emiliano Vargas, squaring off, a reference to this rivalry.
