= Christopher Díaz (boxer) =

Puerto Rican boxer (born 1994)

Personal information
- Nickname: Pitufo (Smurf)
- Nationality: Puerto Rican
- Born: Christopher Díaz Vélez; October 31, 1994 (age 31) Philadelphia, Pennsylvania, U.S.
- Height: 5 ft 6 in (168 cm)
- Weight: Featherweight; Super featherweight

Boxing career
- Reach: 64 in (163 cm)
- Stance: Orthodox

Boxing record
- Total fights: 36
- Wins: 30
- Win by KO: 19
- Losses: 6

Christopher Díaz Vélez (born October 31, 1994) is an American-born Puerto Rican professional boxer who has fought for world titles on three occasions. At regional level he held the NABO junior-lightweight title from 2017 to 2018.

== Professional career ==
Díaz signed with Top Rank in 2015. On 26 December 2016, he was named Prospect Of The Year by ESPN Deportes.

=== Diaz vs. Bryant ===
Diaz won the vacant NABO junior-lightweight title by stopping Bryant Cruz in the third round at The Plaza Live in Orlando, Florida, on 9 December 2017.

=== Diaz Vs Ito ===
Diaz faced Masayuki Ito for the vacant WBO junior-lightweight title at Kissimmee Civic Center in Kissimmee, Florida on 28 July 2018, losing by unanimous decision.

=== Diaz vs. Sanchez ===
On 23 June 2020, Diaz fought Jason Sanchez at MGM Grand Conference Center, Paradise, Nevada. Diaz won via unanimous decision, 98–92, 98–92 and 97–93.

=== Diaz vs. Navarrete ===
Diaz challenged Emanuel Navarrete for his WBO featherweight title at Silver Spurs Arena in Kissimmee, Florida, on 24 April 2021. Having been sent to the canvas four times throughout the fight, he lost via technical knockout in the 12th and final round.

=== Diaz vs. Dogboe ===
Diaz fought Isaac Dogboe for the NABF featherweight title at the Michelob Ultra Arena in Paradise, Nevada, on 20 November 2021. He lost via majority decision, with the scorecards reading 97–93 and 96–94 in favour of Dogboe and the third judge scoring it 95-95.

=== Diaz vs. Núñez ===
Diaz got his third shot at a world title when he challenged IBF junior-lightweight champion Eduardo Núñez at Centro de Usos Multiples in Los Mochis, Sinaloa, Mexico, on 6 September 2025. He lost by unanimous decision.

== Professional boxing record ==
36 fights	30 wins	6 losses
By knockout	19	1
By decision	11	5

No.	Result	Record	Opponent	Type	Round, time	Date	Location	Notes
36	Loss	30–6	Eduardo Núñez	UD	12	Sep 6, 2025	Centro de Usos Multiples, Los Mochis, Sinaloa, Mexico	For IBF junior lightweight title
35	Win	30–5	Jose Antonio Meza	UD	8	Apr 18, 2025	Caribe Royale, Orlando, U.S	
34	Loss	29–5	Henry Lebron	UD	10	Dec 7, 2024	Coliseo Roberto Clemente, San Juan, Puerto Rico	
33	Win	29–4	Derlyn Hernandez-Gerarldo	TKO	2 (8), 2:36	July 13, 2024	Wells Fargo Center, Philadelphia, U.S	
32	Win	28–4	Headley Scott	TKO	2 (10), 1:48	Mar 2, 2024	Coliseo Jose Miguel Agrelot, San Juan, Puerto Rico	
31	Win	27–4	Deivi Julio	RTD	6 (10), 3:00	May 21, 2022	Caribe Royale, Orlando, U.S	
30	Loss	26–4	Isaac Dogboe	MD	10	Nov 20, 2021	Michelob Ultra Arena, Paradise, Nevada, U.S.	For NABF featherweight title
29	Loss	26–3	Emanuel Navarrete	TKO	12 (12), 2:49	Apr 24, 2021	Silver Spurs Arena, Kissimmee, Florida, U.S.	For WBO featherweight title
28	Win	26–2	Jason Sanchez	UD	10	Jun 23, 2020	MGM Grand Conference Center, Paradise, Nevada, U.S.	
27	Win	25–2	Adeilson Dos Santos	UD	10	Jan 18, 2020	Turning Stone Resort Casino, Verona, New York, U.S.	
26	Loss	24–2	Shakur Stevenson	UD	10	Apr 20, 2019	Madison Square Garden, New York City, New York, U.S.	For IBF Inter-Continental and vacant WBO-NABO featherweight titles
25	Win	24–1	David Berna	KO	1 (10), 1:08	Nov 24, 2018	Sheraton Puerto Rico Hotel & Casino, San Juan, Puerto Rico	
24	Loss	23–1	Masayuki Ito	UD	12	Jul 28, 2018	Kissimmee Civic Center, Kissimmee, Florida, U.S.	For vacant WBO junior lightweight title
23	Win	23–0	Braulio Rodríguez	TKO	4 (10), 0:28	Mar 17, 2018	Madison Square Garden Theater, New York City, New York, U.S.	Retained WBO-NABO junior lightweight title
22	Win	22–0	Bryant Cruz	TKO	3 (10), 0:37	Dec 9, 2017	The Plaza Live, Orlando, Florida, U.S.	Won vacant WBO-NABO junior lightweight title
21	Win	21–0	José Estrella	KO	3 (8), 1:45	Apr 21, 2017	Osceola Heritage Center, Kissimmee, Florida, U.S.	
20	Win	20–0	Efrain Esquivias	TKO	7 (8), 2:18	Feb 3, 2017	Roberto Clemente Coliseum, San Juan, Puerto Rico	
19	Win	19–0	Fernando Vargas	UD	8	Nov 18, 2016	Osceola Heritage Center, Kissimmee, Florida, U.S.	
18	Win	18–0	Raúl Hirales Jr.	UD	8	Sep 23, 2016	Osceola Heritage Center, Kissimmee, Florida, U.S.	
17	Win	17–0	Neftali Campos	TKO	8 (8), 0:32	Jun 11, 2016	Madison Square Garden Theater, New York City, New York, U.S.	
16	Win	16–0	Ray Ximenez	UD	8	Apr 16, 2016	Roberto Clemente Coliseum, San Juan, Puerto Rico	Won vacant WBO Youth featherweight title
15	Win	15–0	Ángel Luna	KO	4 (8), 2:42	Feb 27, 2016	Madison Square Garden Theater, New York City, New York, U.S.	
14	Win	14–0	Jerry Guevara	KO	6 (8), 1:20	Dec 11, 2015	Roberto Clemente Coliseum, San Juan, Puerto Rico	
13	Win	13–0	Karl García	KO	2 (8), 0:26	Oct 31, 2015	Osceola Heritage Center, Kissimmee, Florida, U.S.	
12	Win	12–0	Alcides Santiago	TKO	1 (8), 2:26	Aug 15, 2015	Rubén Rodríguez Coliseum, Bayamón, Puerto Rico	
11	Win	11–0	Marcello Gallardo	UD	6	Jun 13, 2015	Madison Square Garden Theater, New York City, New York, U.S.	
10	Win	10–0	José Bustos	RTD	5 (6), 3:00	Apr 25, 2015	Mario Morales Coliseum, Guaynabo, Puerto Rico	
9	Win	9–0	Luis Ruiz Jr.	UD	6	Feb 28, 2015	USF Sun Dome, Tampa, Florida, U.S.	
8	Win	8–0	Jazzma Hogue	UD	6	Dec 13, 2014	2300 Arena, Philadelphia, Pennsylvania, U.S.	
7	Win	7–0	Francisco Camacho	KO	4 (6), 0:55	Oct 4, 2014	Bahia Shrine Temple, Orlando, Florida, U.S.	
6	Win	6–0	Reggie Santiago	TKO	1 (6), 2:00	Aug 16, 2014	Coliseo Héctor Solá Bezares, Caguas, Puerto Rico	
5	Win	5–0	Lamar Charlton	TKO	2 (4), 2:38	Apr 19, 2014	Bahia Shrine Temple, Orlando, Florida, U.S.	
4	Win	4–0	Luis Hernández	UD	4	Mar 22, 2014	Roger Mendoza Coliseum, Caguas, Puerto Rico	
3	Win	3–0	José Rodríguez	SD	4	Feb 1, 2014	Roger Mendoza Coliseum, Caguas, Puerto Rico	
2	Win	2–0	Jonathan Feliciano	TKO	1 (4), 1:57	Dec 14, 2013	Roger Mendoza Coliseum, Caguas, Puerto Rico	
1	Win	1–0	John Portillo	KO	2 (4), 2:36	Sep 26, 2013	Sands Casino Resort Bethlehem, Bethlehem, Pennsylvania, U.S.	

== Personal life ==
Díaz has three daughters.
