= Roberto Durán vs. Kirkland Laing =

Boxing match

- Date: September 4, 1982
- Venue: Cobo Arena, Detroit, Michigan, U.S.

Tale of the tape
Boxer	Roberto Durán	Kirkland Laing
Nickname	Manos de Piedra ("Hands of Stone")	The Gifted One
Hometown	Panama City, Panama	Nottingham, England
Pre-fight record	74–3 (56 KO)	23–3–1 (10 KO)
Age	31 years, 2 months	28 years, 2 months
Height	5 ft 7 1/2 in (171 cm)	5 ft 10 in (178 cm)
Weight	155 lb (70 kg)	149 1/4 lb (68 kg)
Style	Orthodox	Orthodox
Recognition	WBA; No. 5 Ranked Light Middleweight; The Ring; No. 8 Ranked Light Middleweight; 2–division world champion	Former British welterweight champion

Result
- Laing wins via SD (96–94, 96–94, 94–96)

Roberto Durán vs. Kirkland Laing was a professional boxing match contested on September 4, 1982. The virtually unknown Laing scored an upset win over Durán, a 2-division world champion who was considered one of boxing's top fighters.

The Ring magazine named the fight the upset of the year for 1982.

== Background ==
Earlier in the year, 2-division world champion Roberto Durán had lost to WBC super middleweight champion Wilfred Benítez in his bid for a third world title in a third different weight class. Having lost his last two world title fights, the 31-year old Durán was thought to possibly be on the decline, though he announced his intentions to continue his boxing career. A rematch with Benítez was discussed, while then-WBA super welterweight champion Davey Moore, former welterweight champion Thomas Hearns and then-undefeated prospects Mike McCallum and Tony Ayala Jr. also emerged as possible opponents.

In late July 1982, Durán's next opponents were narrowed down to Moore and Ayala. Durán's promoter Don King announced that Durán would face Ayala on November 19, while rival promoter Bob Arum claimed Durán had agreed to face Moore. Days later, Durán admitted that while he had reached an agreement with Arum to face Moore, he would indeed face Ayala for King, claiming the confusion was caused by him being unaware that his former manager had signed a three-fight contract with King earlier in the year.

Before facing Ayala in November, Durán would first take a tune-up fight with Kirkland Laing scheduled for September 4 in Detroit's Cobo Arena. While Laing sported a decent 23–3–1 record and had held the British welterweight title, he was completely unknown in the United States and had not faced anyone close to the status of Durán. Laing was given virtually no chance to win and was such a heavy underdog that oddsmakers didn't bother setting any betting lines, while some in the British media called for the fight to be cancelled thinking Laing's life could be at risk against a fighter the caliber of Durán.

== The fight ==
In a shocking upset, Laing earned a split decision victory, winning on 2 judge's scorecards by the score of 96–94, while the third scored the fight 96–94 in favor of Durán. Using constant movement and an unorthodox hands down approach, Laing gave Durán trouble throughout the fight as Durán struggled to land any substantial offense. In the seventh Laing was able to land a huge right hand that stunned Durán and controlled the remainder of the fight thereafter, serving as the aggressor and peppering the tired Durán with jabs.

== Aftermath ==
Following his loss to Laing, Durán's anticipated match with Ayala was almost immediately cancelled, as it was thought Durán's poor performance would hurt the marketability of the fight. Angered by Durán's loss, Don King stormed into the dressing room after the fight and exchanged words with Durán and his team. King then severed ties with Durán stating "I will not stand in his way if he insists on continuing in the ring, but I will not promote him anymore." and urged him to retire "with the dignity his career deserves." Durán chose to continue his boxing career and signed with Bob Arum only weeks after the Laing fight. The following year, Durán would upset 23-year old super welterweight champion Davey Moore to capture his third world title.

Meanwhile, hoping to capitalized on Laing's big win and sudden popularity, his manager Mickey Duff hoped to pit Laing against either of the top two welterweight contenders, Milton McCrory and Donald Curry, however these fights never came to be. Laing remained inactive for over a year and when he finally returned, he was knocked out by Fred Hutchings. Following the loss to Hutchings, Laing returned to fighting lower-level fighters mostly in his Native England until 1994, never again reaching world title contention.

== Fight card ==
Confirmed bouts:

Weight Class	Weight		vs.		Method	Round	Notes
Super Welterweight	154 lbs.	Kirkland Laing	def.	Roberto Durán	SD	10/10
Super Welterweight	154 lbs.	David Braxton	def.	Miguel Angel Hernandez	KO	2/10
Lightweight	135 lbs.	Jimmy Paul	def.	Tyrone Lee	TKO	1/10
Middleweight	160 lbs.	Duane Thomas	def.	Jesse Abrams	UD	2/10

== Broadcasting ==
Country	Broadcaster
Mexico	Televisa
Philippines	MBS 4
United Kingdom	BBC
United States	ESPN

Preceded by vs. Wilfred Benítez	Roberto Durán's bouts 4 September 1982	Succeeded by vs. Jimmy Batten
Preceded by vs. Joey Mack	Kirkland Laing's bouts 4 September 1982	Succeeded by vs. Fred Hutchings
Awards
Previous: José Cuevas vs. Roger Stafford	The Ring Upset of the Year; 1982	Next: Michael Dokes vs. Gerrie Coetzee
Previous: José Cuevas vs. Roger Stafford	KO Magazine Upset of the Year; 1982	Next: Michael Dokes vs. Gerrie Coetzee
