= Lloyd Honeyghan =

British boxer (born 1960)

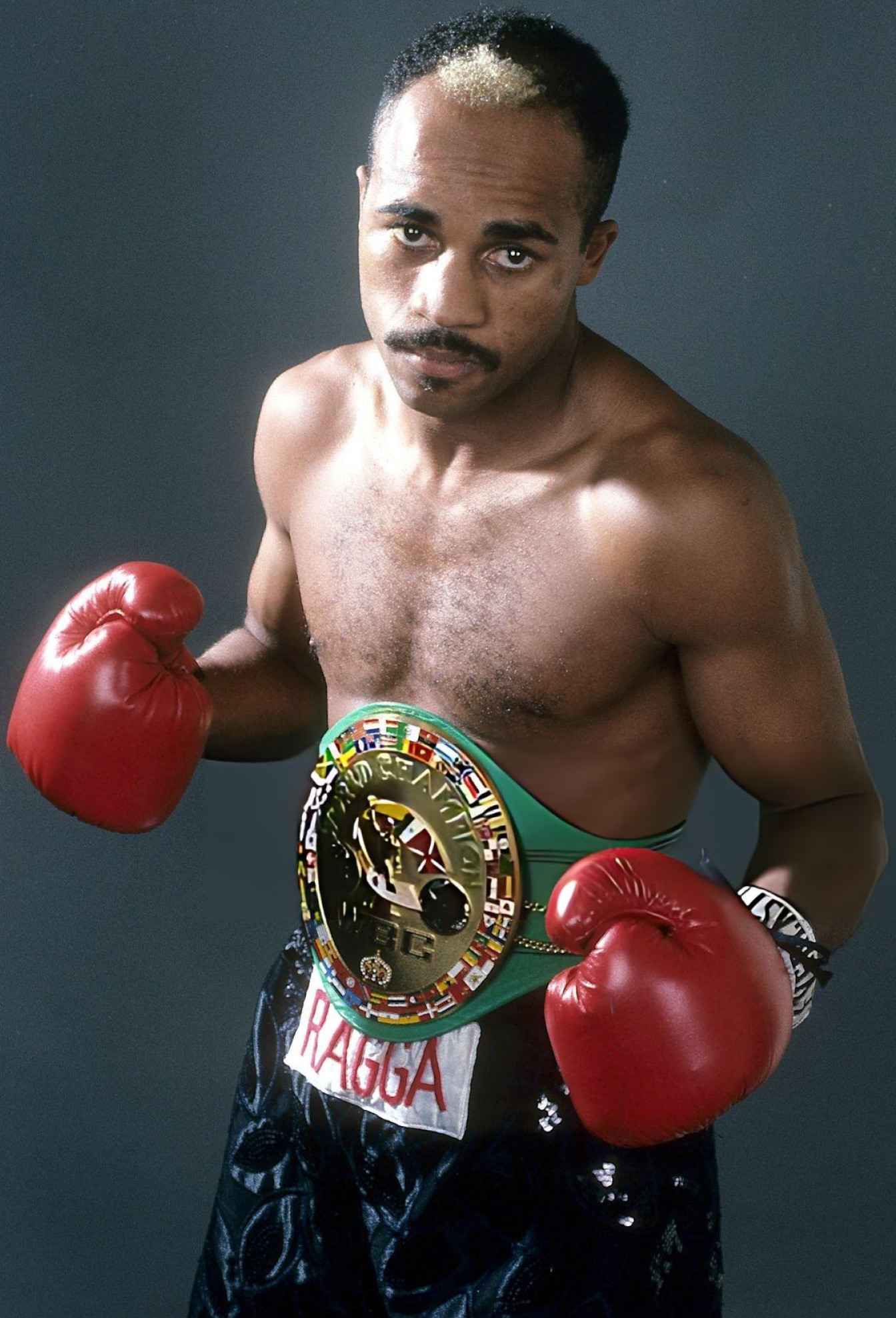
- Honeyghan in 1988

Personal information
- Nicknames: Honey; Raggamuffin Man
- Nationality: British
- Born: 22 April 1960 (age 66) Saint Elizabeth, Jamaica
- Height: 5 ft 9 in (175 cm)
- Weight: Welterweight; Light-middleweight

Boxing career
- Reach: 68 in (173 cm)
- Stance: Orthodox

Boxing record
- Total fights: 48
- Wins: 43
- Win by KO: 30
- Losses: 5

Lloyd Honeyghan (born 22 April 1960) is a British former professional boxer who competed from 1980 to 1995. He reigned as the undisputed welterweight champion from 1986 to 1987, and held the WBC, The Ring magazine welterweight titles twice between 1986 and 1989. At regional level he held the British, European and Commonwealth welterweight titles between 1983 and 1985, and the Commonwealth super-welterweight title from 1993 to 1994.

== Early life and amateur career ==
Honeyghan was born in Jamaica and spent his early years there living with his grandparents. He came to England at the age of nine to join his parents who had settled in Bermondsey. He took up boxing at the age of 11 with the Fisher Amateur Boxing club. He was a good, rather than an outstanding amateur boxer. He boxed for England but never won an ABA title, being beaten in the English semi-finals by Joey Frost in 1979. In the 1980 ABA championships he was beaten early in the competition on points by Gunther Roomes, at the South East Division of the London championships and decided to turn professional.

== Professional career ==
Honeyghan turned professional with Terry Lawless in 1980. He debuted with a six-round points decision victory over fellow novice Mike Sullivan. He won his first 13 fights, including a victory over the tough Kostas Petrou. Before positioning himself for an eliminator against the capable Lloyd Hibbert for the British welterweight title on 18 January 1983. Honeyghan outpointed the future British super-welterweight champion over ten rounds. He followed this by capturing the Southern Area welterweight title with a fourth-round knockout over the dangerous Sid Smith in March 1983.

=== British welterweight champion ===
Honeyghan captured the British welterweight title via a twelve-round points decision against the tough Cliff Gilpin on 5 April 1983, after suffering the first knockdown of his career in the second round. Honeyghan later stated that Gilpin gave him one of his hardest fights.

He remained busy throughout 1983, travelling to the United States to defeat Kevin Austin, then outpointing US contender Harold Brazier in London before rounding off the year with a clear points victory in a British title rematch with Cliff Gilpin.

In 1984 Honeyghan fought only once, defeating Roberto Mendez. He suffered a broken thumb and had to have a pin inserted into his left hand to keep the bone in place.

=== European welterweight champion ===
On 5 January 1985 he captured the European welterweight title with a highly impressive third-round knockout of future two-time super-welterweight world champion Gianfranco Rosi in Perugia, Italy. In sparring preparing for the contest Honeyghan had been knocked out by former ABA champion David Dent, who was not known as a puncher. However, it did not affect his performance as he achieved the rare feat of a foreign fighter obtaining a victory in Italy. Following this, Honeyghan defeated R W Smith (better known as Robert Smith) who is the current General Secretary of the British Boxing Board of Control in six rounds. He kept extremely busy during 1985, defeating three US contenders in world title challenger Roger Stafford, followed by Danny Paul and Ralph Twinning.

Honeyghan and Lawless parted company because Honeyghan believed that Lawless was spending too much time on the career of Frank Bruno and not enough on his career. As such the two could not get on and things came to a head following an altercation between Honeyghan and his trainer Jimmy Tibbs, in the Royal Oak gym run by Lawless. An argument between the two ended up with bystanders having to drag them apart. Following the incident, Lawless banned Honeyghan from his gym; Honeyghan promptly signed with Mickey Duff.

Honeyghan appointed former British featherweight champion Bobby Neill as his new trainer and closed out 1985 with a stoppage victory over fellow world rated Briton and former stablemate Sylvester Mittee, for the British, European, and Commonwealth welterweight titles.

On 20 May 1986 Honeyghan stopped top US contender Horace Shufford in eight rounds in London, earning him a title shot against the unbeaten and undisputed welterweight world champion Donald Curry of the US.

=== Undisputed welterweight champion ===
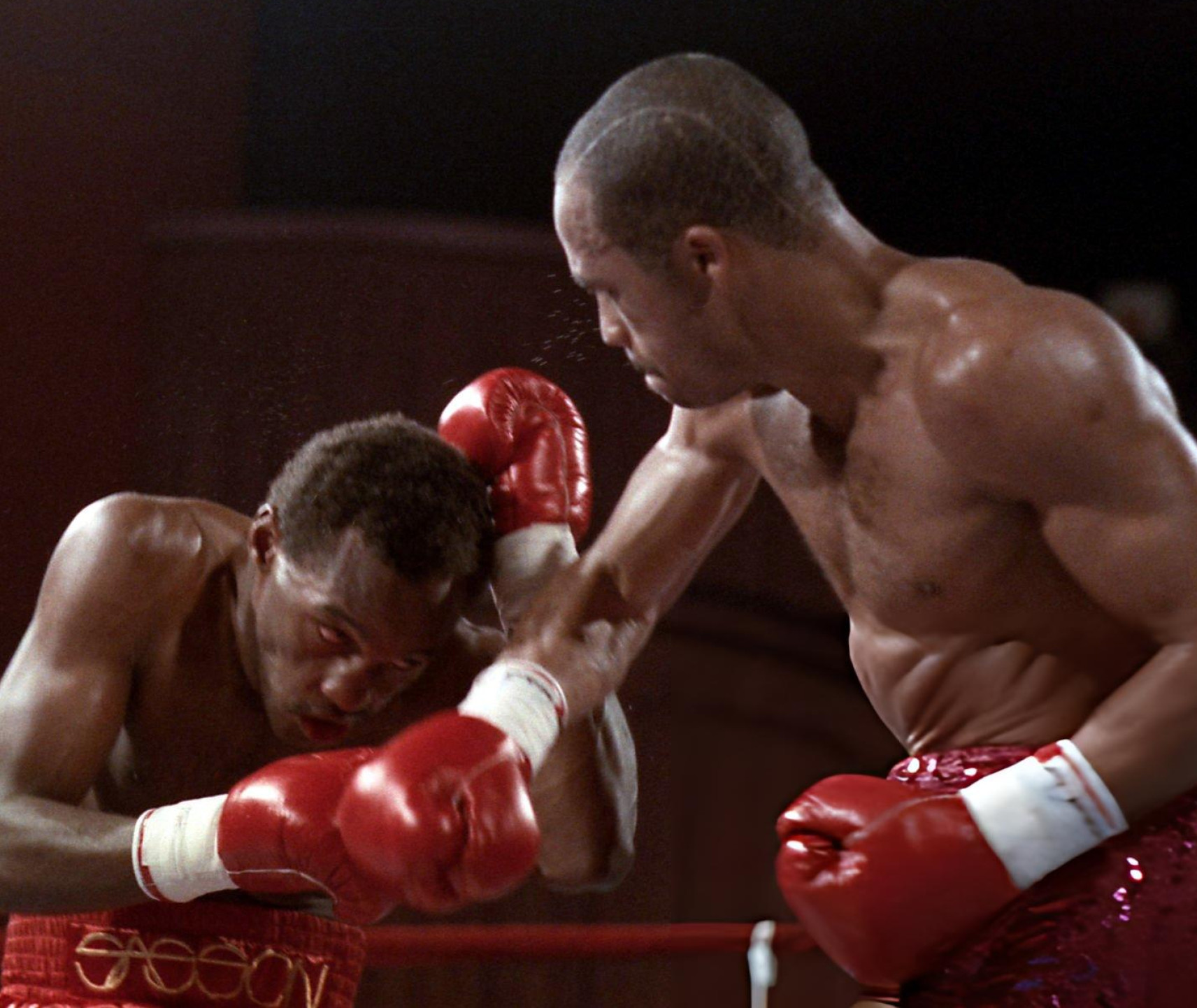
Honeyghan punching Curry

On 27 September 1986, Honeyghan defeated Curry for the undisputed welterweight title. The fight took place in Atlantic City, New Jersey, and was televised by Showtime.

At the time Curry was considered to be one of the best pound for pound fighters in the world with his only possible rival being Marvin Hagler. Honeyghan was given little chance by the majority of the media. However, there were rumours that Curry was having difficulty making the welterweight limit and that this would be his last fight at the weight.

The betting odds prior to the fight were 7.5–1 against Honeyghan. His manager Duff placed a bet of $5,000 on Honeyghan to win. When he told Honeyghan what he had done he said that they could split it down the middle. Duff refused and told him to place his own bets. Honeyghan asked Duff to place a bet of $5,000 on his behalf but when he went back to place the bet the odds had reduced to 6-1 and Duff placed the bet. When he told Honeyghan about the reduced odds he said they could split the difference and again Duff refused.

He caused a major upset by dominating the fight, nearly dropping Curry in the second round, before Curry retired at the end of round six. Curry suffered a broken nose along with cuts to his lip and above his eye, which required 20 stitches. As a result of his bet Honeyghan earned an additional $30,000 and Duff relented and split the difference paying him an additional $3,750 because he was the one who had won the fight.

At the press conference before the fight Curry had dismissed his little known and lightly taken British opponent, asking "Who is this ragamuffin?" Because Honeyghan had come to the press conference in casual clothes. Honeyghan thereafter adopted the title 'Raggamuffin' with relish. Embracing his Jamaican heritage where a raggamuffin is a streetwise tough guy. Prior to this his ring moniker had been Lloyd 'Honey' Honeyghan.

The fight had taken place one night after another "expert shocker", when Edwin Rosario knocked out Livingstone Bramble in two rounds to claim the WBA lightweight title, and one week after Honeyghan's win, Ring magazine mentioned his victory on their "Weekend of shockers!" issue's cover. (Rosario's photo was featured on the cover of that issue).

=== WBA title vacated ===
Honeyghan disagreed with the WBA's rules that allowed fights to take place in apartheid South Africa, so he publicly and controversially dumped the WBA welterweight title into a London trash bin soon after winning it, relinquishing the title rather than defending it against South African Harold Volbrecht. Honeyghan was criticised for showing a lack of respect after dropping the belt in the trash can, especially as Deuk Koo Kim had lost his life in 1982 when fighting Ray Mancini for the WBA Lightweight title. Honeyghan did admit to regretting his actions, which had resulted after he had been prompted to do so by tabloid newspaper photographers. His stance proved significant, as soon after, the WBA stopped sanctioning fights held in South Africa.

=== Continued title defences ===
After winning the world title he changed his boxer-puncher style to that of more of a brawler. He became known for his full frontal assault on opponents. Most boxers would spend the early rounds boxing cautiously until they had figured out their opponent's style of fighting. Honeyghan went for a knockout from the opening bell. Asked why he had changed his fighting style Honeyghan said "I don't really dance around the ring as I used to a couple of years ago. I just come prepared like Rambo, and just go out there to do my stuff now. I haven't got time to mess around, because you can get hurt out there and you don't get paid for overtime. These promoters don't pay no extra money."

In his first defence, after dominating and flooring his opponent in the first round. He caused controversy by (legally at that time) racing across the ring and trying to hit his opponent, former super-lightweight world champion Johnny Bumphus, as soon as the bell sounded to start the second round. Honeyghan threw a left hook which missed but the momentum from his forearm knocked an unsteady Bumphus to the canvas. Honeyghan had a point deducted from his score and Bumphus was given time to recover. However, the fight had already been knocked out of him and he did not last much longer. Asked why he had done this, Honeyghan stated "The bell went ding and I went dong." The rules were changed following this incident so that at the beginning of each round the referee stands in the middle of the ring instead of in a neutral corner, as it had previously been, to prevent punches being thrown until both fighters are ready.

In his second defence of the title, Honeyghan defeated the then unbeaten future world champion Maurice Blocker on points. He became a crowd pleaser with his all action style of fighting and recorded one of the fastest wins in a world title fight with a 45 second blowout of former Super-lightweight champion Gene Hatcher of the US. His manager Duff said after the fight "The best fighter I have been involved with was John Conteh, even though he never reached his full potential. Lloyd is catching him up fast. I've never known a more dedicated fighter."

=== Losing the titles ===
He controversially lost his WBC title to Jorge Vaca in 1987 when a clash of heads meant that the fight had to be stopped due to a cut sustained by Vaca. Vaca had come in as a late replacement for Bobby Joe Young who had been deemed an unacceptable opponent by the British Boxing Board of Control. Honeyghan was expected to win the fight as Vaca was a relatively unknown fighter. However, an off form Honeyghan was given plenty of trouble by the heavy-handed Mexican. The WBC implemented their technical decision rule (which has now been withdrawn) and Honeyghan had a point deducted from his score, even though the clash of heads had been deemed accidental and the round had not been completed. Without the point deduction the fight would have been a draw meaning that Honeyghan would have retained his title. After the point deduction the scorecards favoured Vaca and he became the new champion. The fight was not for the IBF title which was declared vacant and was subsequently won by Simon Brown. Many fans said that Vaca had been given the decision because the WBC who are based in Mexico were holding their convention in London during the week of the fight.

Honeyghan became only the second British boxer in history to regain a world title, when he knocked Vaca out with an uppercut to the Solar plexus in a return fight for the WBC title in the third round. The first being Ted "Kid" Lewis earlier in the 20th century. In the post-fight press conference Honeyghan, who could at times be an outspoken character, expressed his views on Mickey Duff, stating "Mickey and I don't mix outside of boxing, he looks at me as a pawn, a commodity. I don't like him." This elicited a memorable response from Duff who stated "There is nothing in our contract that says we have to like each other I will continue to do the best job I can for him."

Honeyghan had appointed Duff as both his manager and promoter. The job of the manager is to arrange the best matches and obtain the most money for the boxer. The job of the promoter is to negotiate with boxing managers to obtain the services of their boxers for the lowest amount possible to ensure the promotion makes a profit. As such, when Duff was promoting a show featuring Honeyghan he was actually negotiating with himself as to how much money Honeyghan would be paid. There was a clear conflict of interest and Honeyghan believed that Duff was not paying him the kind of money he thought his services warranted. Duff once called Honeyghan an ingrate because without his connections and promotional skills Honeyghan would never have become the number one contender and obtained the fight with Curry.

At that time Duff was the main boxing promoter in the UK through his company National Promotions in conjunction with Jarvis Astaire, Mike Barrett and Terry Lawless. They were known as 'The Cartel' because they controlled British boxing. Frank Warren and Barry Hearn were only just emerging on the scene and as a British fighter, if you wanted to fight for a world title you had to work with Duff, who had contacts in the world of boxing.

Professional boxers are classified as being self-employed and under the standard British Boxing Board of Control Boxer/Manager Agreement the manager is paid 25% of the amount the boxer earns. As such Duff was being paid 25% of Honeyghan's earnings from boxing plus any profit he made from the boxing shows that he promoted featuring Honeyghan. The argument that was used by Duff was that once he agreed to pay a specific amount to a fighter, he would have to pay that amount whether the promotion made money or not. As such he could find himself out of pocket if the promotion lost money. Duff had a reputation for treating fighters as if he was their employer and they were his employee. Honeyghan who was known for being headstrong thought to himself "I am the champion and no one tells me what to do" that was part of the reason why he resented Duff.

Honeyghan next defended against tough South Korean Yung-Kil Chung, halting him in five rounds in July 1988 when the Korean refused to get up after being hit with an accidental low blow.

In February 1989 Honeyghan lost his WBC title to former Don Curry victim and arch-rival Marlon Starling. There was bad blood between the two fighters and Honeyghan boxed wildly against the defensively excellent Starling. He was stopped in the ninth round after taking heavy punishment throughout the fight. Years before the two fought Starling came out with a classic foot in mouth boxing quote when he said "I'll fight Lloyd Honeyghan for nothing if the price is right." Honeyghan returned later in the year, labouring to a points decision over Delfino Marin in Florida, however he appeared to be a fading force.

He had to apologise to the WBA for his previous actions in order to fight for the WBA title in 1990 against Mark Breland. By this time Honeyghan was past his best and was stopped by Breland in three rounds after being knocked down six times.

=== Later career at super-welterweight ===
In 1991, he resumed his career at super-welterweight having outgrown the welterweight division. During 1991 and 1992 he won six consecutive fights against relatively modest opposition in Mario Olmedo, John Welters, Darryl Anthony, Alfredo Ramirez, Mickey Duncan and Carlo Colarusso. In early 1993 he was still good enough to win the Commonwealth super-welterweight title by defeating the useful Mickey Hughes. However, in June of that year he was stopped in ten rounds by former world champion Vinny Pazienza in a contest made at middleweight. Victories over Steve Goodwin and in 1994 Kevin Adamson followed, with Honeyghan retaining the Commonwealth title in the latter fight. He did not fight for another year and retired after he was stopped in a bout by fellow Briton Adrian Dodson in three rounds in 1995, on the undercard of Nigel Benn vs. Gerald McClellan.

== Doping allegations ==
Lloyd Honeyghan always had trouble with his hands and tested positive for a painkilling drug after his fight against Marlon Starling. He was fined $1,500 by the Nevada Athletic Commission.

== Personal life ==
On leaving school Honeyghan became an apprentice printer working at Fleet Street where the national newspapers were printed. He continued in this trade until he became a full time professional boxer.

In his younger days Honeyghan developed a reputation for being a flashy dresser and a ladies' man. The tabloid newspapers had a field-day when he became a world champion and revealed that he had fathered five children with three different women, none of whom he had married.

He was attacked and hit on the head with a hammer at a weigh-in at the Thomas A' Beckett gym in 1993. A fellow boxer, Darren Dyer, was arrested and charged with causing actual bodily harm after the attack but was acquitted in the subsequent trial. Honeyghan said that he was signing an autograph for a fan, when Dyer approached him and swung a carrier bag containing the hammer at him. The bag hit him on the forehead and although stunned, he managed to remain on his feet. He said that Dyer was so enraged prior to the attack that he looked like E.T., Dyer's defence was that they had a fist fight and he got the better of it.

There had been bad blood between the two stemming from the Curry fight, when Dyer who was also managed by Duff had been one of Honeyghan's sparring partners. The trouble between them started when Dyer was talking on the telephone in his hotel room to one of his relatives in England. The relative asked him how he thought Honeyghan would get on against Curry. Dyer stated that he did not think that Honeyghan stood a chance and that Curry would knock him out. Unbeknown to him Honeyghan was in the hotel room next to his and heard everything that he said. Honeyghan took offence to his comments and confronted him about them.

Dyer felt that Honeyghan had taken liberties with him in sparring as a means of getting his revenge for the comments. Bearing in mind that despite being a former ABA champion and Commonwealth games gold medal winner, Dyer at the time was still to make his professional debut. There had been an altercation between him and Dyer in the changing rooms following his win over Mickey Hughes for the Commonwealth title. Dennie Mancini had prevented Dyer from hitting Honeyghan on the head with the trophy he had just been presented with, as a result of winning the fight.

When Frank Bruno fought Oliver McCall for the WBC World heavyweight title in September 1995. Honeyghan entered the ring as a member of McCall's camp, despite the fact that he and Bruno had been friends in the past, when they had both been part of the Terry Lawless stable of fighters. He received a lot of criticism from British boxing fans as a result of his actions.

Honeyghan and Mike Tyson are friends and when Tyson came to England he acted as his guide. They had first met at the Curry fight where Tyson had been ringside and had been impressed by Honeyghan's performance. He stated "He's mean and nasty, he doesn't fight like a British fighter." Stated in reference to his less than imperious reputation both in and out of the ring; in contrast with the gentlemanly reputation of British boxers in America at the time.

In 2014 Bruno had to step in to stop Honeyghan and Errol Christie from squaring up to each other at the Boxing Writers’ Club’s 63rd annual dinner at London’s Savoy Hotel. This came as a shock to many observers as the two had once been close friends. Christie stated “There was a bit of an incident with Lloyd. I don’t know what planet he was on but it’s different to the rest of us. No punches were thrown, he was just mouthing off and acting the big shot. He even had a go at Frank.”

He had a block of flats named after him in Southwark to mark his achievements.

Honeyghan put on a lot of weight in retirement and in October 2017, it was reported that he had suffered a heart attack but was making a good recovery in hospital. It was reported in September 2020 that Honeyghan had suffered a blood clot on his lung (Pulmonary embolism) and was again being treated in hospital. As a result of a car accident, Honeyghan can no longer walk and has to use a wheelchair.

== Business dealings ==
Towards the end of his boxing career Honeyghan got involved in the music business. He produced two CDs featuring various reggae artists.

In common with a lot of former boxing champions Honeyghan found himself in financial difficulties towards the end of his career and was forced to fight on beyond the point where he should have retired. At one stage he had owned a Rolls-Royce and several properties. However, he was declared bankrupt in 1994 and automatically discharged from bankruptcy in 1997. He had made the mistake of building a lifestyle based on him continuing to earn the kind of money he was being paid whilst he was a world champion. However, once he became an ex-champion, promoters weren't willing to pay him the same kind of money and his lifestyle became unsustainable.

Following his retirement, he tried his hand as a boxing manager and promoter. He promoted a few boxing shows in South London. However, without the backing of a television company it was difficult for him to make money and he eventually relinquished his promoter's licence.

== Professional boxing record ==
48 fights	43 wins	5 losses
By knockout	30	4
By decision	13	1

No.	Result	Record	Opponent	Type	Round, time	Date	Location	Notes
48	Loss	43–5	Adrian Dodson	TKO	3 (10), 2:24	25 Feb 1995	London Arena, London, England	
47	Win	43–4	Kevin Adamson	TKO	6 (12)	26 Feb 1994	Earls Court Exhibition Centre, London, England	Retained Commonwealth super-welterweight title
46	Win	42–4	Steve Goodwin	KO	6 (10)	2 Nov 1993	Elephant and Castle Shopping Centre, London, England	
45	Loss	41–4	Vinny Pazienza	TKO	10 (12), 0:56	26 Jun 1993	Convention Hall, Atlantic City, New Jersey, US	
44	Win	41–3	Mickey Hughes	TKO	5 (12), 1:00	30 Jan 1993	International Centre, Brentwood, England	Won Commonwealth super-welterweight title
43	Win	40–3	Carlo Colarusso	KO	6 (10)	28 Oct 1992	Royal Albert Hall, London, England	
42	Win	39–3	Mickey Duncan	RTD	2 (10), 3:00	13 May 1992	Royal Albert Hall, London, England	
41	Win	38–3	Alfredo Ramirez	PTS	8	22 Apr 1992	Wembley Arena, London, England	
40	Win	37–3	Darryl Anthony	KO	2 (10)	8 May 1991	Royal Albert Hall, London, England	
39	Win	36–3	John Welters	KO	1 (10)	12 Feb 1991	Festival Hall, Basildon, England	
38	Win	35–3	Mario Olmedo	TKO	4 (10)	10 Jan 1991	Latchmere Leisure Centre, London, England	
37	Loss	34–3	Mark Breland	TKO	3 (12)	3 Mar 1990	Wembley Arena, London, England	For WBA welterweight title
36	Win	34–2	Delfino Marin	UD	10	24 Aug 1989	Hyatt Regency, Tampa, Florida, US	
35	Loss	33–2	Marlon Starling	TKO	9 (12), 1:19	4 Feb 1989	Caesars Palace, Paradise, Nevada, US	Lost WBC and The Ring welterweight titles
34	Win	33–1	Yung-Kil Chung	TKO	5 (12), 0:42	29 Jul 1988	Convention Hall, Atlantic City, New Jersey, US	Retained WBC and The Ring welterweight titles
33	Win	32–1	Jorge Vaca	KO	3 (12), 2:58	29 Mar 1988	Wembley Arena, London, England	Won WBC and The Ring welterweight titles
32	Loss	31–1	Jorge Vaca	TD	8 (12)	28 Oct 1987	Wembley Conference Centre, London, England	Lost WBC and The Ring welterweight titles; Split TD: Vaca was cut from an accidental head clash
31	Win	31–0	Gene Hatcher	TKO	1 (12), 0:45	30 Aug 1987	Plaza de Toros de Nueva Andalucía, Marbella, Spain	Retained WBC, IBF, and The Ring welterweight titles
30	Win	30–0	Maurice Blocker	UD	12	18 Apr 1987	Royal Albert Hall, London, England	Retained WBC, IBF, and The Ring welterweight titles
29	Win	29–0	Johnny Bumphus	TKO	2 (12), 0:55	22 Feb 1987	Wembley Conference Centre, London, England	Retained WBC, IBF, and The Ring welterweight titles
28	Win	28–0	Donald Curry	RTD	6 (12), 3:00	27 Sep 1986	Circus Maximus Showroom, Atlantic City, New Jersey, US	Won WBA, WBC, IBF, and The Ring welterweight titles
27	Win	27–0	Horace Shufford	TKO	8 (12)	20 May 1986	Wembley Arena, London, England	
26	Win	26–0	Sylvester Mittee	TKO	8 (12), 1:39	27 Nov 1985	Alexandra Palace, London, England	Retained European welterweight title; Won British and Commonwealth welterweight titles
25	Win	25–0	Ralph Twinning	TKO	4 (10), 1:00	1 Oct 1985	Wembley Arena, London, England	
24	Win	24–0	Danny Paul	UD	10	30 Aug 1985	Trump Plaza Hotel and Casino, Atlantic City, New Jersey, US	
23	Win	23–0	Roger Stafford	TKO	9 (10), 2:58	6 Mar 1985	Royal Albert Hall, London, England	
22	Win	22–0	R W Smith	RTD	6 (10), 3:00	12 Feb 1985	Royal Albert Hall, London, England	
21	Win	21–0	Gianfranco Rosi	KO	3 (12), 0:59	5 Jan 1985	PalaEvangelisti, Perugia, Italy	Won European welterweight title
20	Win	20–0	Roberto Mendez	PTS	8	6 Jun 1984	Royal Albert Hall, London, England	
19	Win	19–0	Cliff Gilpin	PTS	12	6 Dec 1983	Royal Albert Hall, London, England	Retained British welterweight title
18	Win	18–0	Harold Brazier	PTS	10	24 Oct 1983	Grosvenor House Hotel, London, England	
17	Win	17–0	Kevin Austin	TKO	10 (10)	9 Jul 1983	DaVinci Manor, Chicago, Illinois, US	
16	Win	16–0	Cliff Gilpin	PTS	12	5 Apr 1983	Royal Albert Hall, London, England	Won vacant British welterweight title
15	Win	15–0	Sid Smith	KO	4 (10), 2:05	1 Mar 1983	Royal Albert Hall, London, England	Won Southern Area welterweight title
14	Win	14–0	Lloyd Hibbert	PTS	10	18 Jan 1983	Royal Albert Hall, London, England	
13	Win	13–0	Frank McCord	KO	1 (8), 2:12	22 Nov 1982	Hilton on Park Lane, London, England	
12	Win	12–0	Ian Kid Murray	TKO	3 (8), 1:20	22 Sep 1982	Hilton on Park Lane, London, England	
11	Win	11–0	Kostas Petrou	PTS	8	18 May 1982	York Hall, London, England	
10	Win	10–0	Dave Sullivan	TKO	3 (8), 1:34	23 Mar 1982	York Hall, London, England	
9	Win	9–0	Derek McKenzie	TKO	6 (8), 1:35	15 Mar 1982	Hilton on Park Lane, London, England	
8	Win	8–0	Tommy McCallum	PTS	6	2 Mar 1982	Royal Albert Hall, London, England	
7	Win	7–0	Granville Allen	TKO	5 (6), 1:25	9 Feb 1982	Royal Albert Hall, London, England	
6	Win	6–0	Dave Finigan	KO	2 (6)	25 Jan 1982	Hilton on Park Lane, London, England	
5	Win	5–0	Alan Cooper	TKO	4 (8), 1:08	24 Nov 1981	Wembley Arena, London, England	
4	Win	4–0	Dave Finigan	TKO	1 (8), 1:36	16 Nov 1981	Hilton on Park Lane, London, England	
3	Win	3–0	Dave Sullivan	PTS	6	10 Feb 1981	York Hall, London, England	
2	Win	2–0	Dai Davies	TKO	5 (6)	20 Jan 1981	York Hall, London, England	
1	Win	1–0	Mike Sullivan	PTS	6	8 Dec 1980	Royal Albert Hall, London, England	

== Titles in boxing ==
=== Major world titles ===
- WBA welterweight champion (147 lbs)
- WBC welterweight champion (147 lbs) (2×)
- IBF welterweight champion (147 lbs)

=== The Ring magazine titles ===
- The Ring welterweight champion (147 lbs) (2×)

=== Regional/International titles ===
- Southern Area welterweight champion (147 lbs)
- British welterweight champion (147 lbs) (2×)
- European welterweight champion (147 lbs)
- Commonwealth welterweight champion (147 lbs)
- Commonwealth light middleweight champion (154 lbs)

=== Undisputed titles ===
- Undisputed welterweight champion

== See also ==
- List of welterweight boxing champions
- List of WBA world champions
- List of WBC world champions
- List of IBF world champions
- List of The Ring world champions
- List of undisputed boxing champions

Sporting positions
Regional boxing titles
Preceded by Sid Smith	Southern Area welterweight champion 1 March 1983 – 5 April 1983; Won full British title	Vacant Title next held by Rocky Kelly
Vacant Title last held by Colin Jones	British welterweight champion 5 April 1983 – April 1985; Vacated	Vacant Title next held by Kostas Petrou
Preceded by Gianfranco Rosi	European welterweight champion 5 January 1985 – September 1986; Vacated	Vacant Title next held by Jose Varela
Preceded by Sylvester Mittee	British welterweight champion 27 November 1985 – September 1986; Vacated	Vacant Title next held by Kirkland Laing
Preceded by Sylvester Mittee	Commonwealth welterweight champion 27 November 1985 – September 1986; Vacated	Vacant Title next held by Brian Janssen
Preceded by Mickey Hughes	Commonwealth super-welterweight champion 30 January 1993 – October 1994; Vacated	Vacant Title next held by Leo Young Jr.
World boxing titles
Preceded by Donald Curry	WBA welterweight champion 27 September 1986 – 5 January 1987; Vacated	Vacant Title next held by Mark Breland
Preceded by Donald Curry	WBC welterweight champion 27 September 1986 – 28 October 1987	Succeeded by Jorge Vaca
Preceded by Donald Curry	IBF welterweight champion 27 September 1986 – 28 October 1987; Vacated	Vacant Title next held by Simon Brown
Preceded by Donald Curry	The Ring welterweight champion 27 September 1986 – 28 October 1987	Succeeded by Jorge Vaca
Preceded by Donald Curry	Undisputed welterweight champion 27 September 1986 – 5 January 1986; Titles fragmented	Vacant Title next held by Cory Spinks
Preceded by Jorge Vaca	WBC welterweight champion 29 March 1988 – 4 February 1989	Succeeded by Marlon Starling
Preceded by Jorge Vaca	The Ring welterweight champion 29 March 1988 – 4 February 1989	Succeeded by Marlon Starling
Awards
Previous: Michael Spinks; UD15 Larry Holmes	The Ring Upset of the Year; RTD6 Donald Curry; 1986	Next: Sugar Ray Leonard; SD12 Marvin Hagler
Previous: Michael Spinks; UD15 Larry Holmes	KO Magazine Upset of the Year; RTD6 Donald Curry; 1986	Next: Sugar Ray Leonard; SD12 Marvin Hagler
