= Donald Curry vs. Lloyd Honeyghan =

Boxing match in 1986

The Brawl on the Boardwalk
- Date: September 27, 1986
- Venue: Caesars Atlantic City, Atlantic City, New Jersey, U.S.
- Title(s) on the line: WBA, WBC, IBF and The Ring Undisputed welterweight titles

Tale of the tape
Boxer	Donald Curry	Lloyd Honeyghan
Nickname	The Lone Star Cobra	Honey
Hometown	Fort Worth, Texas, U.S.	London, England
Purse	$300,000	$162,750
Pre-fight record	25–0 (19 KO)	27–0 (15 KO)
Age	25 years	26 years, 5 months
Height	5 ft 10 1/2 in (179 cm)	5 ft 9 in (175 cm)
Weight	147 lb (67 kg)	147 lb (67 kg)
Style	Orthodox	Orthodox
Recognition	WBA, WBC, IBF and The Ring; Undisputed Welterweight Champion	WBC; No. 1 Ranked Welterweight; WBA/The Ring; No. 3 Ranked Welterweight; IBF; No. 8 Ranked Welterweight; British, Commonwealth and European; Welterweight Champion

Result
- Honeyghan wins via 6th-round corner retirement

Donald Curry vs. Lloyd Honeyghan, billed as The Brawl on the Boardwalk, was a professional boxing match contested on September 27, 1986, for the WBA, WBC, IBF and The Ring welterweight titles.

== Background ==
In May 1986, a fight between the WBC's two top welterweight contenders, the number-one ranked Horace Shufford and number-two ranked Lloyd Honeyghan, headlined a card held at Wembley Arena with the winner scheduled to challenge the undisputed welterweight champion Donald Curry. Curry, who had won the undisputed crown the year before, had been mulling a move up to the light middleweight division since, but had decided to remain a welterweight shortly before the Shufford–Honeyghan was scheduled. Honeyghan would upset Shufford, who had been the WBC's number-one welterweight contender for 18 months, earning the victory via eighth-round technical knockout and setting up his title shot against Curry, which was made official that August to take place on September 27.

Going into the fight, Curry sported an undefeated 25–0 record and was regarded as one of boxings top fighter and was a heavy favorite over Honeyghan, who was virtually unknown in the United States despite having a fair amount of success in his home country of England where he had won and still held the British, Commonwealth and European welterweight titles. However, showing faith in his fighter, Honeyghan's manager Mickey Duff would place a $5,000 bet at 7–1 odds on Honeyghan winning. During the pre-fight buildup, Curry would infamously refer to Honeyghan as a "ragamuffin." Though Curry used the term as an insult, the moniker stuck with Honeyghan, who would use the nickname "Ragamuffin Man" for the remainder of his boxing career.

== Fight Details ==
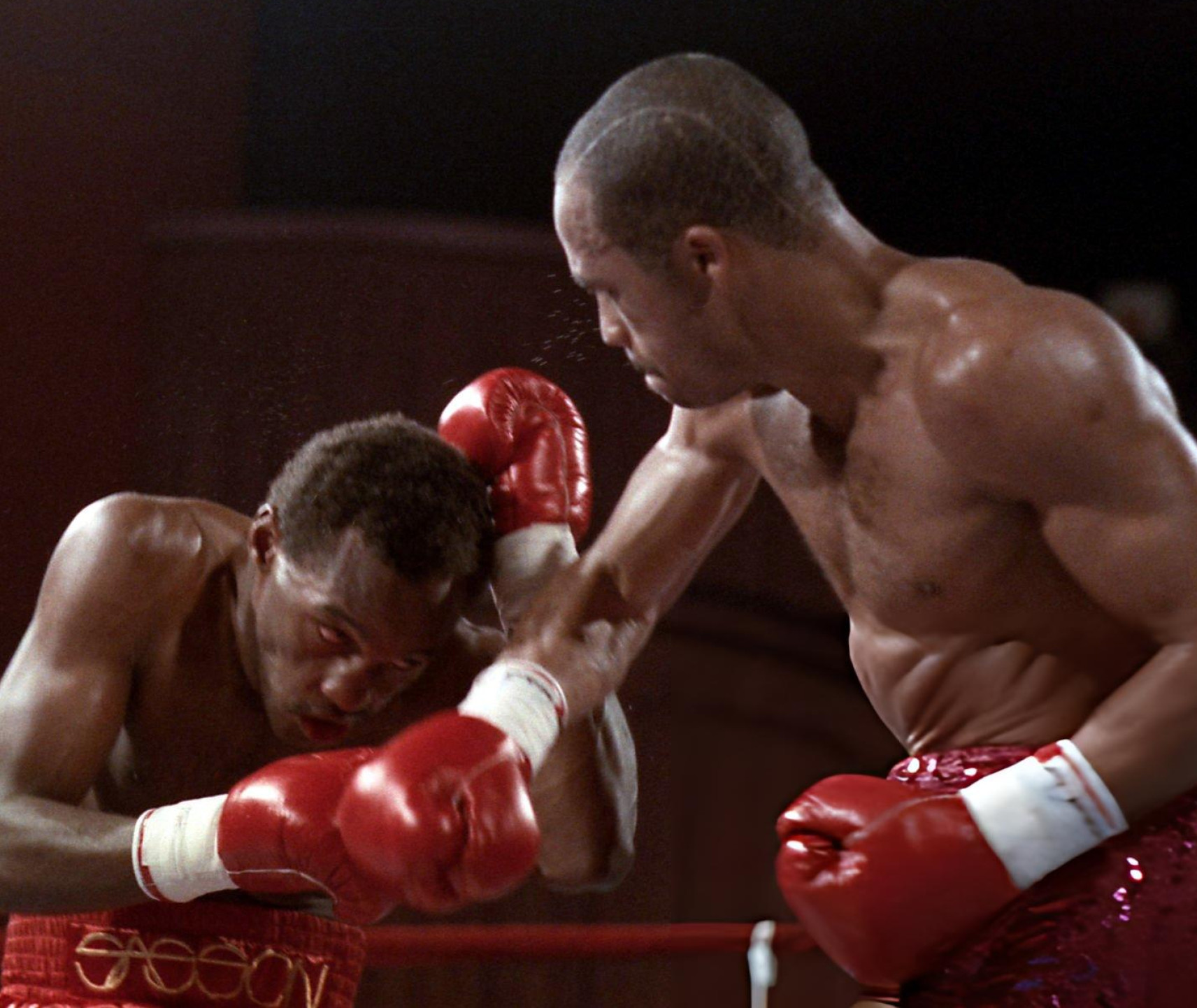

Honeyghan got off to a fast start as he utilized an aggressive style and won the first two rounds as a result. Early in the second round, Honeyghan staggered Curry with a right hand that buckled Curry's knees, caused his mouth to bleed and nearly sent him down, forcing Curry to clinch Honeyghan in an effort to slow down Honeyghan and survive the round, which he did despite Honeyghan constantly attacking Curry and landing at a decent rate. Curry would rebound to win the third and fourth rounds, temporarily slowing Honeyghan down, though Honeyghan regained control in the fight round and badly hurt Curry twice in the round after landing two big right hands, once again forcing Curry to constantly clinch Honeyghan to survive the round. The beginning of the end for Curry would occur in the sixth and final round of the bout after an accidental clash of heads between the fighters opened up a sizable gash underneath his left eyebrow. After finishing the round, which was dominated by Honeyghan, Curry's wound was examined by the ringside doctor and it was determined that he should not continue the fight, giving Honeyghan the upset victory via corner retirement.

== Aftermath ==
Honeyghan's victory is regarded as one of boxing's biggest upsets as well one of biggest wins in British boxing history. The Ring magazine named it their upset of the year for 1986 as did rival magazine KO Magazine, while sports website Bleacher Report listed it as the biggest upset win by a British fighter.

In January 1987, Honeyghan dumped the WBA belt due to its policy toward apartheid South Africa, thus this was the last bout for the undisputed welterweight championship until 2003's Ricardo Mayorga vs. Cory Spinks.

== Fight card ==
Confirmed bouts:

Weight Class	Weight		vs.		Method	Round	Notes
Welterweight	147 lbs.	Lloyd Honeyghan	def.	Donald Curry (c)	RTD	6/15	^{note 1}
Lightweight	135 lbs.	Terrance Alli	def.	Miguel Santana	UD	12/12	^{note 2}
Light Middleweight	154 lbs.	Tony Montgomery	def.	Joe Summers	TKO	3/8
Middleweight	160 lbs.	Steve Darnell	def.	Ali Bey	TKO	1/6

^Note 1 For WBA, WBC, IBF and The Ring Welterweight Titles
^Note 2 For Vacant IBF USBA Lightweight Title

== Broadcasting ==
Country	Broadcaster
United Kingdom	ITV
United States	Showtime

Preceded by vs. Eduardo Rodriguez	Donald Curry's bouts 27 September 1986	Succeeded by vs. Tony Montgomery
Preceded by vs. Horace Shufford	Lloyd Honeyghan's bouts 27 September 1986	Succeeded by vs. Johnny Bumphus
Awards
Preceded by Larry Holmes vs. Michael Spinks	The Ring Upset of the Year; 1986	Succeeded by Marvin Hagler vs. Sugar Ray Leonard
Preceded by Larry Holmes vs. Michael Spinks	KO Magazine Upset of the Year; 1988	Succeeded by Marvin Hagler vs. Sugar Ray Leonard
