= Michael Duff =

Michael Duff is the name of:

- Michael Duff (physicist) (born 1949), British theoretical physicist
- Michael Duff (footballer) (born 1978), Northern Irish international footballer and manager
- Sir Michael Duff, 3rd Baronet (1907–1980), British statesman and socialite
- Michael J. B. Duff (1933–2021), British computer scientist and physicist

== See also ==
- Mickey Duff (1929–2014), British boxer
- Michelle Duff, (born Michael Allan Duff, 1939–2025), Canadian road racer
