= Neil Sinclair =

Irish boxer

Personal information
- Nickname: Sinky
- Nationality: British; Irish
- Born: 23 February 1974 (age 52) Belfast, Northern Ireland, U.K.
- Height: 5 ft 10 1/2 in (179 cm)
- Weight: Welterweight; Light middleweight

Boxing career
- Reach: 72 in (183 cm)
- Stance: Orthodox

Boxing record
- Total fights: 41
- Wins: 33
- Win by KO: 26
- Losses: 8
Medal record
Men's amateur boxing
Representing Ireland
Junior World Championships
Bronze medal – third place	1992 Montreal	Light middleweight
Representing Northern Ireland
Commonwealth Games
Gold medal – first place	1994 Victoria	Welterweight

Neil Sinclair (born 23 February 1974), is a Northern Irish former professional boxer who competed from 1995 to 2010. He challenged once for the WBO welterweight title in 2010. At regional level, he held the British welterweight title from 2001 to 2003 and challenged once for the EBU European Union title in 2008. As an amateur, he won a bronze medal representing Ireland at the 1992 Junior World Championships and gold while representing Northern Ireland at the 1994 Commonwealth Games.

== Amateur career ==
Sinclair boxed for Ireland as an amateur and won a bronze medal at the World Junior Championships at Montreal in 1992 and also won a gold for Northern Ireland at the 1994 Commonwealth Games in Victoria, British Columbia, Canada.

== Professional career ==
Sinclair turned professional in April 1995, winning his first fight at the Ulster Hall, Belfast, in which he knocked out Marty Duke on a card that included Darren Corbett and the final fight in the career of Damien Denny.

In June 2007, Sinclair announced his retirement, although he decided to return to boxing within a couple of months.

In May 2009, Sinclair won the Irish light-middleweight title with a stoppage victory over Henry Coyle at the Odyssey Arena, Belfast.

== Professional boxing record ==
41 fights	33 wins	8 losses
By knockout	26	5
By decision	7	3
Draws	0	

No.	Result	Record	Opponent	Type	Round, time	Date	Location	Notes
41	Loss	33–8	(United Kingdom) Bradley Pryce	SD	3	2010-02-26	(United Kingdom) York Hall, London, England	Prizefighter 10: light middleweight quarter-final
40	Win	33–7	(Hungary) Janos Petrovics	TKO	4 (8)	2009-11-06	(United Kingdom) Odyssey Arena, Belfast, Northern Ireland	
39	Win	32–7	(Republic of Ireland) Henry Coyle	TKO	3 (10), 0:22	2009-05-15	(United Kingdom) Odyssey Arena, Belfast, Northern Ireland	Won vacant BUI Ireland National super welterweight title
38	Loss	31–7	(Italy) Daniele Petrucci	UD	12	2008-06-07	Foro Italico, Rome, Italy	For EBU European Union welterweight title
37	Win	31–6	(Spain) Juan Martinez	PTS	8	2008-03-29	(Republic of Ireland) Letterkenny Leisure Complex, Letterkenny, Ireland	
36	Win	30–6	(Latvia) Sergejs Savrinovics	PTS	6	2007-08-18	(Republic of Ireland) City Hall, Cork, Ireland	
35	Loss	29–6	(United Kingdom) Francis Jones	KO	5 (8), 3:07	2007-06-23	(Republic of Ireland) The Point, Dublin, Ireland	
34	Win	29–5	(Poland) Arek Malek	TKO	4 (6), 1:50	2007-02-17	(Republic of Ireland) City Hall, Cork, Ireland	
33	Loss	28–5	(The Bahamas) Jerome Ellis	TKO	6 (10), 1:49	2006-07-05	(United States) City Auditorium, Colorado Springs, Colorado, U.S.	
32	Loss	28–4	(United Kingdom) Taz Jones	TKO	1 (8), 1:20	2005-03-18	(United Kingdom) King's Hall, Belfast, Northern Ireland	
31	Win	28–3	(United Kingdom) Craig Lynch	PTS	6	2004-07-30	(United Kingdom) York Hall, London, England	
30	Win	27–3	(United Kingdom) Bradley Pryce	TKO	8 (12), 1:54	2003-02-01	(United Kingdom) Odyssey Arena, Belfast, Northern Ireland	Retained BBBofC British welterweight title
29	Win	26–3	(United Kingdom) Paul Knights	TKO	2 (12), 1:07	2002-11-02	(United Kingdom) Maysfield Leisure Centre, Belfast, Northern Ireland	Retained BBBofC British welterweight title
28	Win	25–3	(Belarus) Dzmitri Kashkan	TKO	4 (8), 2:21	2002-08-17	(United Kingdom) Cardiff Castle, Cardiff, Wales	
27	Win	24–3	(Republic of Ireland) Derek Roche	KO	1 (12), 2:20	2002-06-15	(United Kingdom) Town Hall, Leeds, England	Retained BBBofC British welterweight title
26	Win	23–3	(Estonia) Leonti Vorontsuk	TKO	4 (8), 2:35	2002-04-20	(United Kingdom) International Arena, Cardiff, Wales	
25	Win	22–3	(United Kingdom) Harry Dhami	TKO	5 (12), 2:44	2001-11-19	(United Kingdom) Holiday Inn, Glasgow, Scotland	Won BBBofC British welterweight title
24	Win	21–3	(Ukraine) Viktor Fesechko	PTS	6	2001-09-22	(United Kingdom) York Hall, London, England	
23	Win	20–3	(Hungary) Zoltan Szili	KO	2 (8), 1:25	2001-04-28	(United Kingdom) International Arena, Cardiff, Wales	
22	Loss	19–3	(Puerto Rico) Daniel Santos	KO	2 (12), 2:25	2000-12-16	(United Kingdom) Sheffield Arena, Sheffield, England	For WBO welterweight title
21	Win	19–2	(United Kingdom) Adrian Chase	TKO	2 (8), 0:30	2000-08-12	(United Kingdom) Conference Centre, London, England	
20	Win	18–2	(Barbados) Christopher Henry	TKO	1 (8), 1:46	24 Jun 2000	(United Kingdom) Hampden Park, Glasgow, Scotland	
19	Win	17–2	(United Kingdom) Paul Dyer	TKO	6 (8), 1:19	2000-05-16	(United Kingdom) Spectrum Arena, Warrington, England	
18	Win	16–2	(United Kingdom) Dennis Berry	TKO	2 (8)	2000-03-18	(United Kingdom) Kelvin Hall, Glasgow, Scotland	
17	Win	15–2	(United Kingdom) Paul Dyer	TKO	8 (8)	1999-10-16	(United Kingdom) Maysfield Leisure Centre, Belfast, Northern Ireland	
16	Win	14–2	(United Kingdom) David Kirk	PTS	8	1999-06-05	(United Kingdom) International Arena, Cardiff, Wales	
15	Win	13–2	(United Kingdom) Mark Ramsey	TKO	3 (8)	1999-01-22	(Republic of Ireland) Vicar Street, Dublin, Ireland	
14	Win	12–2	(United Kingdom) Michael Smyth	KO	1 (8), 0:38	1998-12-07	(United Kingdom) Town Hall, London, England	
13	Win	11–2	(United Kingdom) Paul Denton	TKO	1 (8)	1998-09-19	(Republic of Ireland) National Basketball Arena, Dublin, Ireland	
12	Win	10–2	(United Kingdom) Leigh Wicks	TKO	1 (6), 2:51	1998-02-21	(United Kingdom) Waterfront Hall, Belfast, Northern Ireland	
11	Win	9–2	(United Kingdom) Chris Pollock	RTD	3 (6), 3:00	1997-12-20	(United Kingdom) Maysfield Leisure Centre, Belfast, Northern Ireland	
10	Win	8–2	(United Kingdom) Trevor Meikle	TKO	5 (6), 1:32	1997-09-27	(United Kingdom) Ulster Hall, Belfast, Northern Ireland	
9	Loss	7–2	(United Kingdom) Dennis Berry	PTS	6	1996-09-03	(United Kingdom) Ulster Hall, Belfast, Northern Ireland	
8	Win	7–1	(United Kingdom) Kasi Kaihau	TKO	2 (6)	1996-05-28	(United Kingdom) Ulster Hall, Belfast, Northern Ireland	
7	Win	6–1	(United Kingdom) Hugh Davey	PTS	6	1996-04-13	(United Kingdom) Everton Park Sports Centre, Liverpool, England	
6	Win	5–1	(United Kingdom) Brian Coleman	RTD	1 (6)	1995-12-02	(United Kingdom) King's Hall, Belfast, Northern Ireland	
5	Win	4–1	(United Kingdom) Wayne Shepherd	TKO	6 (6)	1995-10-07	(United Kingdom) Ulster Hall, Belfast, Northern Ireland	
4	Win	3–1	(United Kingdom) George Wilson	PTS	4	1995-08-26	(United Kingdom) Ulster Hall, Belfast, Northern Ireland	
3	Win	2–1	(United Kingdom) Andy Peach	TKO	1 (6)	1995-07-17	(United Kingdom) Grosvenor House Hotel, London, England	
2	Loss	1–1	(United Kingdom) Andrew Jervis	TKO	3 (6)	1995-05-27	(United Kingdom) King's Hall, Belfast, Northern Ireland	
1	Win	1–0	(United Kingdom) Marty Duke	TKO	2 (6)	1995-04-14	(United Kingdom) Ulster Hall, Belfast, Northern Ireland	

== See also ==
- List of British welterweight boxing champions
