= List of British welterweight boxing champions =

List of British welterweight boxing champions is a table showing the boxers who have won the British welterweight title. The title has been sanctioned by the National Sporting Club since 1909, and later by its replacement British Boxing Board of Control (BBBoC) since 1929.

A champion may retire or voluntarily relinquish the title in order to fight for a higher-ranked championship. Where the date on which a champion relinquished the title is unclear, the date of the last BBBoC sanctioned fight is shown.

^{r}–Champion relinquished title.

^{s}–Champion stripped of title.

Name	Duration of reign	Defences
Young Joseph	19 October 1908 — 6 May 1912^{r}	1
Johnny Summers	17 June 1912 — 9 January 1914	3
Tom McCormick	9 January 1914 — 21 March 1914	2
Matt Wells	21 March 1914^{r}	0
Johnny Basham	14 December 1914 — 9 June 1920	4
Ted "Kid" Lewis	9 June 1920 — 26 November 1924	3
Tommy Milligan	26 November 1924^{r}	0
Johnny Brown	8 October 1925 — 19 November 1925	1
Harry Mason	19 November 1925 — 31 May 1926	2
Jack Hood	31 May 1926 — 13 March 1933^{r}	3
Harry Mason	11 June 1934 — 17 December 1934	1
Pat Butler	17 December 1934^{r}	0
Dave McCleave	23 April 1936 — 2 June 1936	1
Jake Kilrain	2 June 1936 — 23 March 1939	2
Ernie Roderick	23 March 1939 — 8 November 1948	5
Henry Hall	8 November 1948 — 15 November 1949	1
Eddie Thomas	15 November 1949 — 16 October 1951	2
Wally Thom	16 October 1951 — 24 July 1952	1
Cliff Curvis	24 July 1952^{r}	0
Wally Thom	24 September 1953 — 5 June 1956	2
Peter Waterman	5 June 1956 — 17 December 1956^{r}	1
Tommy Molloy	15 July 1958 — 1 February 1960	2
Wally Swift	1 February 1960 — 21 November 1960	1
Brian Curvis	21 November 1960 — 25 November 1965^{r}	6
Johnny Cooke	13 February 1967 — 20 February 1968	2
Ralph Charles	20 February 1968 — 7 December 1971^{r}	2
Bobby Arthur	31 October 1972 — 5 June 1973	1
John H Stracey	5 June 1973^{r}	0
Pat Thomas	15 December 1975 — 7 December 1976	2
Henry Rhiney	7 December 1976 — 4 April 1979	2
Kirkland Laing	4 April 1979 — 1 April 1980	1
Colin Jones	1 April 1980 — 28 April 1981^{r}	2
Lloyd Honeyghan	5 April 1983 — 6 December 1983^{r}	1
Kostas Petrou	13 April 1985 — 18 September 1985	1
Sylvester Mittee	18 September 1985 — 27 November 1985	1
Lloyd Honeyghan	27 November 1985^{r}	0
Kirkland Laing	14 March 1987 — 16 January 1991	4
Del Bryan	16 January 1991 — 20 February 1992	2
Gary Jacobs	20 February 1992 — 9 July 1992^{r}	1
Del Bryan	22 September 1993 — 15 September 1995	4
Chris Saunders	15 September 1995 — 13 February 1996	1
Kevin Lueshing	13 February 1996 — 19 July 1997	1
Geoff McCreesh	19 July 1997 — 31 October 1998^{r}	3
Derek Roche	10 April 1999 — 27 March 2000	3
Harry Dhami	27 March 2000 — 19 November 2001	3
Neil Sinclair	19 November 2001 — 1 February 2003^{r}	3
David Barnes	17 July 2003 — 12 November 2004^{r}	3
Michael Jennings	16 July 2005 — 28 January 2006	2
Young Mutley	28 January 2006 — 1 June 2006	1
Kevin Anderson	1 June 2006 — 2 November 2007	3
Kevin McIntyre	2 November 2007 — 29 February 2008^{r}	1
Kell Brook	14 June 2008 — 18 September 2010^{r}	4
Craig Watson	19 February 2011 — 16 April 2011	0
Lee Purdy	16 April 2011 — 16 July 2011	1
Colin Lynes	9 November 2011 — 12 May 2012	0
Junior Witter	12 May 2012 — 1 November 2012	0
Frankie Gavin	1 November 2012 — 29 November 2014^{r}	4
Sam Eggington	18 July 2015 — 5 March 2016	1
Bradley Skeete	5 March 2016 — 8 July 2017^{r}	3
Johnny Garton	20 October 2018 - 8 March 2019	0
Chris Jenkins	8 March 2019 — 24 July 2021	2
Ekow Essuman	24 July 2021 — 18 November 2023	4
Harry Scarff	18 November 2023 — 25 January 2025	0
Conah Walker	25 January 2025 — December 2025^{r}	1
Constantin Ursu	28 February 2026 — present	0

== See also ==
- List of British heavyweight boxing champions
- List of British cruiserweight boxing champions
- List of British light-heavyweight boxing champions
- List of British super-middleweight boxing champions
- List of British middleweight boxing champions
- List of British light-middleweight boxing champions
- List of British light-welterweight boxing champions
- List of British lightweight boxing champions
- List of British super-featherweight boxing champions
- List of British featherweight boxing champions
- List of British super-bantamweight boxing champions
- List of British bantamweight boxing champions
- List of British super-flyweight boxing champions
- List of British flyweight boxing champions
- List of British world boxing champions

== Sources ==
- boxrec
- Maurice Golesworthy, Encyclopaedia of Boxing (Eighth Edition) (1988), Robert Hale Limited, ISBN 0-7090-3323-0
