= Terry Lawless =

English boxing trainer and manager

Terry Lawless (29 March 1933 – 24 December 2009) was an English boxing manager and trainer who worked in London, most successfully during the 1960s, 1970s and 1980s.

== Biography ==
Born in West Ham, Lawless started his coaching and management career in 1957 after his National Service, and formed a close friendship with Norman Giller, who was then sports editor of the local Stratford Express newspaper. Lawless was based at the Royal Oak gym in the Canning Town district of London. Giller was his publicist throughout his career.

His early stable of local boxers included former London amateurs such as Stan Kennedy, Johnny Caiger, Jimmy Tibbs, Silvester Mittee and Jimmy Anderson. He hired George Wiggs and Frank Black as his training assistants, both of whom stayed with him for more than ten years. Tibbs later rejoined Lawless as a trainer, as did George Francis, who formed a winning team with Frank Bruno.

He was associated with promoters Mickey Duff, Jarvis Astaire, Harry Levene, and Mike Barrett, who effectively controlled British boxing. The team dealt primarily with the BBC, which gave rise to the famous relationship between Frank Bruno and the commentator Harry Carpenter, but they were ousted during the late 1980s by Frank Warren, who initially had the support of ITV.

Famous for looking after his fighters like a father rather than a manager, Lawless often fell out with matchmaker Mickey Duff because he did not want to expose his boxers to unnecessary dangers. Duff stated in his autobiography that Lawless was always asking for opponents who would defend but not attack. This was the reason Frank Bruno never faced David Pearce for the heavyweight championship of Great Britain. While living in retirement in Marbella with his wife of more than 50 years Sylvia, Lawless often said he was happy to be remembered as the manager who did not want his boxers hurt.

Jim Watt, one of six Lawless-trained and managed boxers who went on to win world titles (including Frank Bruno, and Joe Calzaghe under different management), wrote in his autobiography, Watt's My Name:

Terry is that rare breed of manager who treats his boxers like sons rather than fighters. He gives 100 per cent and demands the same in return. If it were not for him, I would not have got near winning a world title. He revitalized my career.

=== Personal life ===
He was married to his wife Sylvia for 53 years and they had two children, three grandchildren and two great-grandchildren.

=== Death ===
On 24 December 2009, Lawless died in Marbella, Spain, in hospital after undergoing gallbladder surgery.

== Boxers managed/trained ==
Among the boxers Lawless managed/trained were:

- Ralph Charles
- John L. Gardner
- Frank Bruno (WBC Heavyweight champion) - a title won under the guidance of Frank Warren
- Charlie Magri (WBC Flyweight champion)
- Maurice Hope (WBC Light Middleweight champion)
- John H. Stracey (WBC Welterweight champion)
- Jim Watt (WBC Lightweight champion)
- Joe Calzaghe (WBO, IBF, WBA, WBC & Ring Super Middleweight champion, but not until he had moved on from the management of Duff and Lawless)
- Jim McDonnell (EBU Featherweight champion)
- Derek Angol (Commonwealth Cruiserweight champion)
- Mark Kaylor (British and Commonwealth middleweight champion)
- Gary Mason (British and Commonwealth heavyweight champion)
- Neville Meade (British and Commonwealth heavyweight champion)
- Mo Hussein (Commonwealth Lightweight champion)
- Jimmy Batten (British Light Middleweight champion)
- Tony Wilson (British Light-Heavyweight champion)
