= Donald Curry vs. Milton McCrory =

Boxing match

The Toss Up
- Date: December 6, 1985
- Venue: Las Vegas Hilton, Paradise, Nevada, U.S.
- Title(s) on the line: WBA, WBC, IBF and The Ring welterweight titles

Tale of the tape
Boxer	Donald Curry	Milton McCrory
Nickname	The Lone Star Cobra	Ice Man
Hometown	Fort Worth, Texas, U.S.	Detroit, Michigan, U.S.
Purse	$750,000	$750,000
Pre-fight record	23–0 (17 KO)	27–0–1 (22 KO)
Age	24 years, 2 months	23 years, 9 months
Height	5 ft 10 1/2 in (179 cm)	6 ft 0 in (183 cm)
Weight	147 lb (67 kg)	147 lb (67 kg)
Style	Orthodox	Orthodox
Recognition	WBA and IBF; Welterweight Champion; The Ring; No. 1 Ranked Welterweight	WBC; Welterweight Champion; The Ring; No. 2 Ranked Welterweight

Result
- Curry wins via 2nd-round knockout

Donald Curry vs. Milton McCrory, billed as The Toss Up, was a professional boxing match contested on December 6, 1985 for the WBA, WBC, IBF and The Ring welterweight titles.

== Background ==
After successfully defending his titles in January 1985, unified WBA and IBF welterweight champion Donald Curry had temporarily moved up to the light middleweight division and had fought and won two non-title bouts against James Green in March and Pablo Baez in June. After his defeat of Baez, Curry and his promoter Bob Arum mulled moving to light middleweight division full-time, with Arum hoping to match Curry against IBF light middleweight Carlos Santos that fall. Curry then expressed interest in moving up to middleweight to challenge long-reigning middleweight champion Marvin Hagler, though he mentioned that he would reconsider his plans and remain a welterweight in order to face WBC welterweight champion Milton McCrory, stating "I probably could do it for Milton, but the longer he waits, the worse the chances are of our meeting."

Following his successful title defense on July 14 against Carlos Trujillo, McCrory, who was also looking to move up to the light middleweight division, announced his intentions to get Curry, a close friend of his, to agree to the much discussed unification bout with Arum targeting a February date the following year stating after his victory over Trujillo "Curry's good, but I'm better. My ambition is to stay champion, preferably a unified champion." In mid-October, the fight was made official, though it was announced to be taking place on December 6 instead of February, with both fighters set to earn $750,000.

== Fight Details ==
Curry dominated McCrory from the opening bell as he pressed the action and remained aggressive offensively through duration of the fight. Two minutes into the first round, Curry stunned McCrory with a left hook and then backed him into a corner with a straight left, forcing McCrory to clinch Curry, though he regained his composure and survived the round, which all three judges scored in Curry's favor.

In the second round, McCrory tried to box Curry using his jab and constant movement though Curry stalked his opponent seemingly waiting for the right opportunity to attack, which occurred just prior to the midway point of the round when Curry caught McCrory flush with a left hook that sent him down on his back. Though clearly hurt from the punch, McCrory staggered back to his feet at the count of eight and referee Mills Lane allowed him to continue, but Curry immediately landed a right hand that sent McCrory back down and sprawled out on the canvas. The dazed McCrory was only able to raise his head and made no attempt to get back to his feet as Lane reached the count of 10, giving Curry the knockout victory at 1:53 of the round.

== Fight card ==
Confirmed bouts:

Weight Class	Weight		vs.		Method	Round	Notes
Welterweight	147 lbs.	Donald Curry (c)	def.	Milton McCrory (c)	KO	2/15	^{note 1}
Bantamweight	118 lbs.	Hurley Snead	def.	Jose Torres	RTD	4/10
Middleweight	160 lbs.	Robbie Sims	def.	Mario Tineo	TKO	4/10
Super Lightweight	140 lbs.	Irleis Perez	def.	Ali Kareem Muhammad	UD	10/10
Heavyweight	200+ lbs.	Joey Christjohn	def.	Oliver McCall	UD	4/4

^Note 1 For WBA, WBC, IBF and The Ring Welterweight Titles

== Broadcasting ==
Country	Broadcaster
United States	HBO

Preceded by vs. Carlos Trujillo	Donald Curry's bouts 6 December 1985	Succeeded by vs. Eduardo Rodriguez
Preceded by vs. Pablo Baez	Milton McCrory's bouts 6 December 1985	Succeeded by vs. Keith Adams
