= Harry Dhami =

British former professional boxer

Personal information
- Nationality: British
- Born: 17 April 1972 (age 54) Gravesend, Kent, England
- Height: 6 ft 0 in (183 cm)
- Weight: Welterweight

Boxing career
- Reach: 77 in (196 cm)
- Stance: Orthodox

Boxing record
- Total fights: 23
- Wins: 17
- Win by KO: 5
- Losses: 5
- Draws: 1

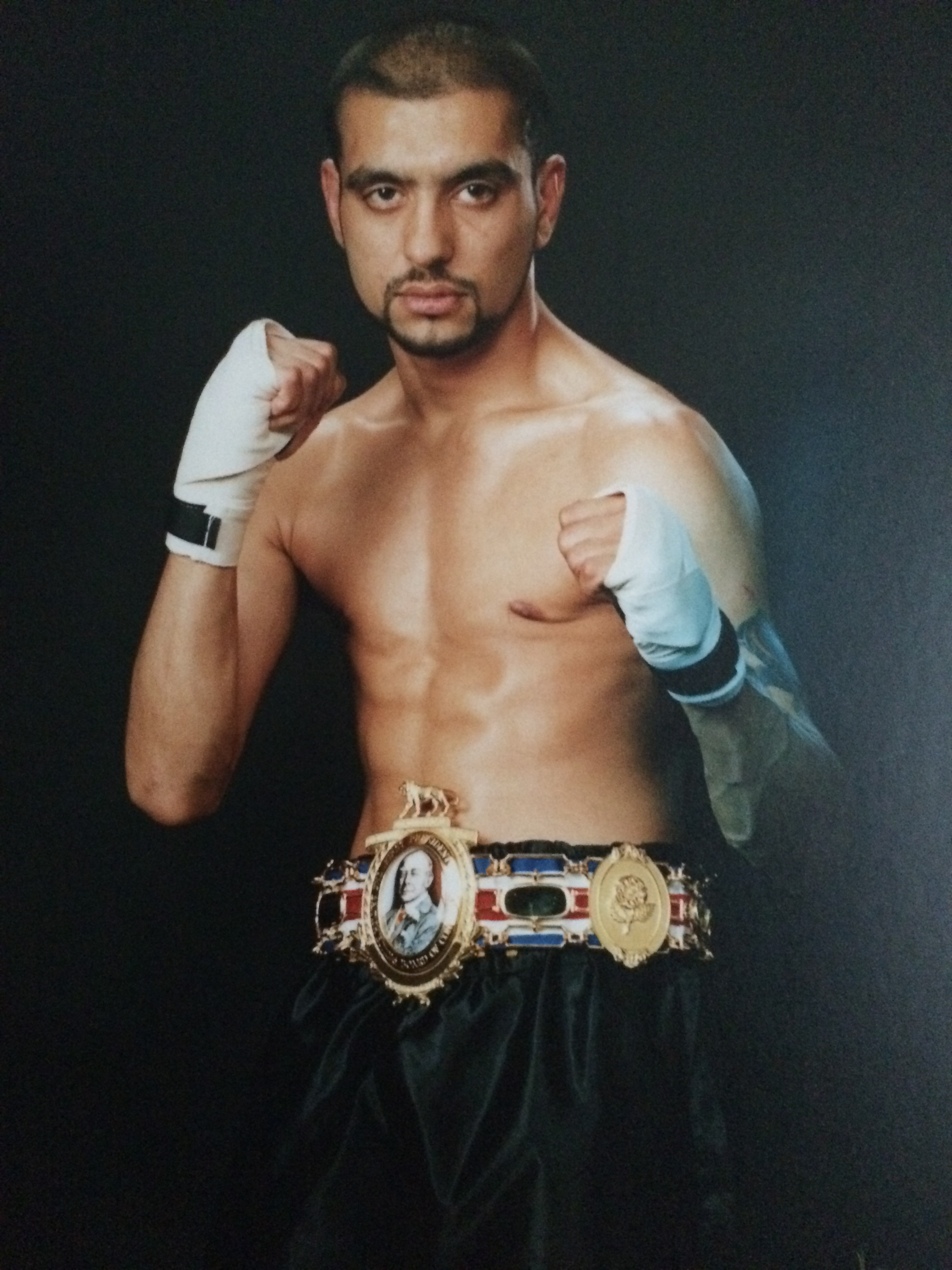

Harry Dhami (born 17 April 1972) is a British former professional boxer who competed from 1992 to 2003. He held the British welterweight title from 2000 to 2001, being the first British Asian to win a British title.

== Career ==
Born and raised in Gravesend, Dhami initially fought at super welterweight. He made his professional début in October 1992 with a points win over Johnny Pinnock. After winning his first three fights he was held to a draw in October 1994 by Steve McNess. A run of four straight defeats followed up to the end of 1995.

Dhami found more success after dropping down to welterweight. He beat Ojay Abrahams in May 1996 to take the BBBofC Southern Area welterweight title, and went on to make four successful defences. After building up a run of ten straight wins, he challenged for Derek Roche's British title in March 2000, taking the title on points. He made successful defences against Malcolm Melvin (October 2000) and Spencer McCracken (November 2000), but didn't win the Lonsdale Belt outright as the rule was changed to require three defences. He lost the title on his third defence in November 2001 when he was stopped in the fifth round by Neil Sinclair.

Dhami switched management to Tommy Gilmour, and was due to return to the ring in July 2003, but both his original opponent, Paul Knights, and his replacement, Jason Williams pulled out. He returned in November 2003 to face super welterweight Lee Armstrong; Dhami won on points, but didn't fight again. He was due to fight Jimmy Vincent in a British title eliminator in April 2004, but the fight was rescheduled for November 2004 after Vincent broke a hand in training. Dhami withdrew from the rescheduled fight due to "niggling injuries".

He went on to start his own gym in Gravesend, the Elite Boxing and Fitness Gym.
