= The Ring magazine Upset of the Year =

Combat magazine award

The Ring magazine was established in 1922 and has since named an Upset of the Year since 1970. The award, based on the magazine's writers' criteria, is given to a fight that resulted in an outcome that was highly contrary to general expectations.

== Upsets of the Year by decade ==
=== 1970s ===
- 1970 – (United States) Billy Backus KO 4 (Cuba) Jose Napoles
- 1971 – (Venezuela) Alfredo Marcano KO 10 (Japan) Hiroshi Kobayashi
- 1972 – (Puerto Rico) Esteban De Jesús W 10 (Panama) Roberto Durán
- 1973 – (United States) Ken Norton W 12 (United States) Muhammad Ali
- 1974 – (United States) Muhammad Ali KO 8 (United States) George Foreman
- 1975 – (United Kingdom) John H. Stracey KO 6 (Cuba) Jose Napoles
- 1976 – (Puerto Rico) Wilfred Benítez W 15 (Colombia) Antonio Cervantes
- 1977 – (Panama) Jorge Luján KO 10 (Mexico) Alfonso Zamora
- 1978 – (United States) Leon Spinks W 15 (United States) Muhammad Ali
- 1979 – (Italy) Vito Antuofermo D 15 (United States) Marvin Hagler

=== 1980s ===
- 1980 – (Japan) Yasutsune Uehara KO 6 (Puerto Rico) Samuel Serrano
- 1981 – (United States) Roger Stafford W 10 (Mexico) Pipino Cuevas
- 1982 – (United Kingdom) Kirkland Laing W 10 (Panama) Roberto Durán
- 1983 – (South Africa) Gerrie Coetzee KO 10 (United States) Michael Dokes
- 1984 – (United States) Gene Hatcher TKO 11 (United States) Johnny Bumphus
- 1985 – (United States) Michael Spinks W 15 (United States) Larry Holmes
- 1986 – (United Kingdom) Lloyd Honeyghan RTD 6 (United States) Donald Curry
- 1987 – (United States) Sugar Ray Leonard W 12 (United States) Marvelous Marvin Hagler
- 1988 – (United States) Iran Barkley TKO 3 (United States) Thomas Hearns
- 1989 – (France) Rene Jacquot W 12 (United States) Donald Curry

=== 1990s ===
- 1990 – (United States) James Douglas KO 10 (United States) Mike Tyson
- 1991 – No award given
- 1992 – (Ghana) Azumah Nelson KO 8 (Australia) Jeff Fenech
- 1993 – (United States) Simon Brown KO 4 (United States) Terry Norris
- 1994 – (South Africa) Vuyani Bungu W 12 (United States) Kennedy McKinney
- 1995 – (Mexico) Willy Salazar KO 7 (United States) Danny Romero
- 1996 – (United States) Evander Holyfield TKO 11 (United States) Mike Tyson
- 1997 – (United States) Vince Phillips KO 10 (Australia) Kostya Tszyu
- 1998 – (United States) Ivan Robinson W 10 (Canada) Arturo Gatti
- 1999 – (United States) Willy Wise W 10 (Mexico) Julio César Chávez

=== 2000s ===
- 2000 – (Mexico) José Luis Castillo W 12 (United States) Stevie Johnston
- 2001 – (United States) Hasim Rahman KO 5 (United Kingdom) Lennox Lewis
- 2002 – (Mexico) Juan Carlos Rubio W 10 (Mexico) Francisco Bojado
- 2003 – (South Africa) Corrie Sanders ТKO 2 (Ukraine) Wladimir Klitschko
- 2004 – (Jamaica) Glen Johnson KO 9 (United States) Roy Jones Jr.
- 2005 – (United States) Zahir Raheem W 12 (Mexico) Erik Morales
- 2006 – (Argentina) Carlos Manuel Baldomir W 12 (United States) Zab Judah
- 2007 – (Philippines) Nonito Donaire KO 5 (Armenia) Vic Darchinyan
- 2008 – (United States) Bernard Hopkins W 12 (United States) Kelly Pavlik
- 2009 – (Mexico) Juan Carlos Salgado KO 1 (Venezuela) Jorge Linares

=== 2010s ===
- 2010 – (United States) Jason Litzau W 10 (Panama) Celestino Caballero
- 2011 – (Japan) Nobuhiro Ishida KO 1 (United States) James Kirkland
- 2012 – (Philippines) Sonny Boy Jaro TKO 6 (Thailand) Pongsaklek Wonjongkam
- 2013 – (Argentina) Marcos Maidana W 12 (United States) Adrien Broner
- 2014 – (United States) Chris Algieri W 12 (Russia) Ruslan Provodnikov
- 2015 – (United Kingdom) Tyson Fury W 12 (Ukraine) Wladimir Klitschko
- 2016 – (United States) Joe Smith Jr. TKO 1 (Poland) Andrzej Fonfara
- 2017 – (United States) Sadam Ali W 12 (Puerto Rico) Miguel Cotto
- 2018 – (Nicaragua) Cristofer Rosales TKO 9 (Japan) Daigo Higa
- 2019 – (United States) Andy Ruiz Jr. TKO 7 (United Kingdom) Anthony Joshua

=== 2020s ===
- 2020 – (United States) Teófimo López W 12 (Ukraine) Vasiliy Lomachenko
- 2021 – (Australia) George Kambosos Jr W 12 (United States) Teófimo López
- 2022 – (Australia) Jai Opetaia W 12 (Latvia) Mairis Briedis
- 2023 – (Mexico) Rafael Espinoza W 12 (Cuba) Robeisy Ramírez
- 2024 – (France) Bruno Surace KO 6 (Mexico) Jaime Munguía
- 2025 – (Mexico) Armando Reséndiz SD 12 (United States) Caleb Plant
