= Kostas Petrou =

British boxer (born 1959)

Personal information
- Nickname: The Greek Tank
- Nationality: British
- Born: Kostas Petrou; 17 April 1959 (age 67) London
- Weight: Welterweight

Boxing career
- Stance: Orthodox

Boxing record
- Total fights: 37
- Wins: 30
- Win by KO: 12
- Losses: 7

Kostas Petrou (born 17 April 1959) is a British former professional boxer of Greek Cypriot origin. Petrou was British Welterweight Champion in 1985.

== Background ==
Petrou spent much of his childhood in Birkenhead where he became a renowned amateur fighter learning his ring craft with Willaston ABC.

== Professional boxing career ==
Petrou later moved to Birmingham and turned professional in 1981 with the Lynch brothers (Tommy and Paddy). After losing on his pro debut due to a cut eye, he raced to 15 successive victories. Petrou became Midlands Area Champion after outpointing Lloyd Christie and British Welterweight Champion on 13 April 1985 after defeating Rocky Kelly by TKO at 1:09 of the ninth round in Darlington. He also contested the Commonwealth (British Empire) Championship against Sylvester Mittee and was at one time the Number 1 contender for the European Title, although Petrou was in fact never afforded the opportunity of fighting for the European crown.

Petrou's style was that of a pressure fighter who incessantly marched forward and eventually wore down his opponents, hence the label "The Greek Tank". He was a regular on ITV's The Big Fight Live series hosted by Gary Newbon and was known as a crowd pleaser. The former World Champion and now Sky Sports pundit Jim Watt often said that Petrou breaks the heart of his opponents with his never say die attitude. The war with Rocky Kelly for the famous Lonsdale belt is still remembered today as one of the great British fights of the 1980s. Daniel Herbert, Managing Director of Boxing News, enthused that it was the best fight he had ever been to, with fortunes back and forth until Petrou proved too strong. Boxing Columnist Clive Bernath stated that Petrou's war with Kelly will live with him forever. Earlier in his career, The Greek Tank fought the future undisputed World Champion Lloyd Honeyghan, losing only on points. Petrou took the fight with only 24 hours notice.

Petrou lost the British title on 18 September 1985, when he was outpointed by Sylvester Mittee for the British and Commonwealth titles, 116-119 for referee Harry Gibbs. Petrou's last professional bout was an impressive TKO victory over future British champion and World Title challenger Ensley Bingham in 1988. Petrou retired at the end of 1988 when he was on the verge of fighting Kirkland Laing for another British title, with a final record of 30 wins out of 37 fights (12 KOs). Petrou was stopped just once in his career, and that was only due to a cut eye in his first professional fight. Paddy Lynch, who has been in the sport for decades, and was Petrou's manager throughout his career, described Petrou as the third best boxer he ever had in his stable.
