= Colin Jones (boxer) =

Welsh boxer (born 1959)

Colin Jones MBE
Personal information
- Nickname: The Punch
- Nationality: Welsh
- Born: Colin Jones; 21 March 1959 (age 67) Swansea, Wales, UK
- Weight: Welterweight

Boxing career
- Stance: Orthodox

Boxing record
- Total fights: 30
- Wins: 26
- Win by KO: 23
- Losses: 3
- Draws: 1
- No contests: 0

Colin Raymond Jones MBE (born 21 March 1959 in Gorseinon, Swansea) is a Welsh former professional boxer, who became British, Commonwealth and European welterweight champion. As an amateur, he represented Great Britain at the 1976 Summer Olympics in Montreal, Quebec, Canada. Colin had a trainer by the name of Gareth Bevan, who was also helped out by his son John Bevan.

== Boxing career ==
In 1976 Jones was the youngest British boxer to qualify for the Olympic Games until Amir Khan appeared at the 2004 Summer Olympics. Jones won the 1976 and 1977 Amateur Boxing Association British welterweight title, when boxing out of the Penyrheol ABC.

Jones was known as a heavy puncher at welterweight and often started his fights slowly. A second-round stoppage of the Danish fighter Hans Henrik Palm in Copenhagen won him the European title.

He lost three times, one by disqualification (Curtis Ramsey), one by split decision (Milton McCrory) and once when he was stopped in four rounds (cuts) by Donald Curry. The latter two losses came in challenges for the world title after he had drawn with McCrory in his first attempt to claim it.

Despite these setbacks at world level (both fights against McCrory were in America and could have gone either way), he was dominant at domestic level with his two "come from behind" knockout victories against the gifted Kirkland Laing particular highlights.

A modest and well-respected fighter, Jones, still regarded as boxing royalty in his native Wales, won the BBC Wales Sports Personality of the Year in 1983.

Jones was assistant to National Coach Tony Williams for the Welsh Boxing team at the 2010 Commonwealth Games.

Jones was appointed Member of the Order of the British Empire (MBE) in the 2020 Birthday Honours for services to boxing in Wales.

== See also ==
- On a Box Nation boxing hour show - Colin Jones was voted the best Welsh boxer not to win a world title and David Pearce was voted the unluckiest fighter never to win a world title in reference to the cruiserweight division not being active in Great Britain at that time. This was backed up by the Ring Magazine publishing the fighter in their top ten unluckiest fighters never to win a world title.
- List of British welterweight boxing champions

Achievements
Preceded by Kirkland Laing	British Welterweight Champion; 1 April 1980 – 28 April 1981; Vacated	Vacant Title next held by Lloyd Honeyghan
