= Donald Curry =

American boxer (born 1961)

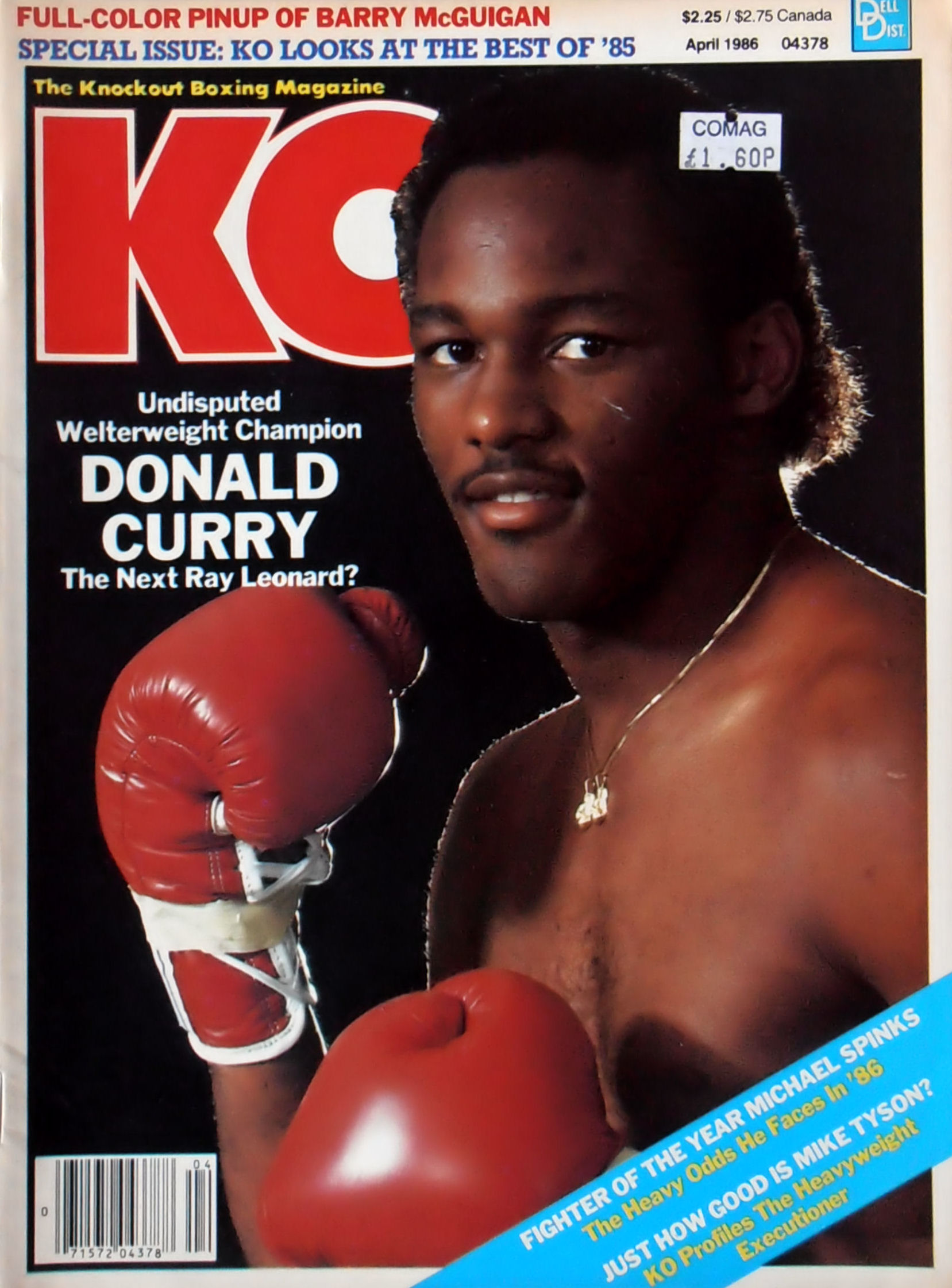
- Curry on the cover of KO Magazine April 1986 issue

Personal information
- Nickname: Lone Star Cobra
- Born: Donald Curry; September 7, 1961 (age 65) Fort Worth, Texas, U.S.
- Height: 5 ft 10 1/2 in (179 cm)
- Weight: Welterweight; Light middleweight; Middleweight

Boxing career
- Reach: 72 in (183 cm)
- Stance: Orthodox

Boxing record
- Total fights: 40
- Wins: 34
- Win by KO: 25
- Losses: 6
Medal record
Men's amateur boxing
US National Championships
| Gold medal – first place | 1978 Biloxi | Light welterweight |
| Gold medal – first place | 1979 Lake Charles | Welterweight |
US National Golden Gloves
| Gold medal – first place | 1980 Shreveport | Welterweight |

Donald Curry (born September 7, 1961), is an American former professional boxer who competed between 1980 and 1997. He has held world championships in two weight classes, including the undisputed (Note: World Boxing Association (WBA), World Boxing Council (WBC), and International Boxing Federation (IBF) titles.) and the Ring magazine welterweight titles between 1983 and 1986 and, the WBC light middleweight title from 1988 to 1989. He also challenged once for the IBF middleweight title in 1990. In 2019, he was inducted into the International Boxing Hall of Fame.

== Amateur career ==
Curry's amateur record is usually listed as 400–4, but it is sometimes listed as 396–4 and 400–6. Curry thinks he might have had more than 404 bouts, but he is sure he had only four losses. Curry was originally trained by Wesley Gale Parker out of Fort Worth, Texas. Parker also trained his brother Super Lightweight champion Bruce Curry.

=== Amateur achievements ===
- 1977 National Junior Olympics Champion (132 lbs)
- 1978 National AAU Champion (139 lbs)
- 1979 National AAU Champion (147 lbs)
- 1980 National Golden Gloves Champion (147 lbs)
- 1980 World Cup Gold Medalist
- 1980 U.S. Olympic Team Member (147 lbs). Curry defeated Davey Moore at the U.S. Olympic Trials, but he did not get to compete at the Olympics in Moscow due to the U.S. boycott. In 2007 he received one of 461 Congressional Gold Medals created especially for the spurned athletes.

=== Highlights ===
Olympic Trials (147 lbs), Atlanta, Georgia, June 1980:

- 1/4: Defeated Michael Wright by unanimous decision, 5–0
- 1/2: Defeated Eddie Green by majority decision, 4–1
- Finals: Defeated Davey Moore by unanimous decision, 5–0

== Professional career ==
=== Early years ===
Curry, at age 19, won his professional debut with a first-round knocked of Mario Tineo on December 26, 1980. "I didn't start thinking about turning pro until I was about 18," Curry said. "I didn't pay attention to the pro game. I couldn't have told you the names of more than two world champions, and they were Ray Leonard and Muhammad Ali."

With a record of 11–0, Curry knocked out former world title challenger Bruce Finch in three rounds to win the NABF welterweight title on May 5, 1982.

Curry fought future WBA/WBC welterweight champion Marlon Starling for the USBA welterweight championship on October 24, 1982. Curry bruised his ribs during training and also had a lot of trouble making weight. He reportedly was nine pounds over the 147-pound welterweight limit less than a week before the fight. Despite these problems, Curry won by a twelve-round split decision to unify the USBA and NABF welterweight titles and hand Starling his first pro loss. The win earned Curry the unified #2 spot in the rankings behind Milton McCrory for the welterweight title.

=== Undisputed welterweight champion ===
On February 13, 1983, Curry fought Jun-Suk Hwang for the WBA welterweight championship, which had become vacant after the retirement of Sugar Ray Leonard. Curry suffered a flash knockdown in the seventh round but otherwise dominated the fight and won by a lopsided fifteen-round unanimous decision. Three months later, Curry's older brother, Bruce, won the WBC light welterweight title. They were the first pair of brothers to hold world titles simultaneously.

After making his first title defense, a first-round knockout of Roger Stafford, Curry had a rematch with Starling. Curry, mixing up punches to the body and head, stayed on top of Starling and pounded out a fifteen-round unanimous decision to retain the titles of the WBA and the newly formed IBF, which elected to recognize Curry as their champion before the fight.

Curry's next three fights were successful title defenses. He stopped Elio Diaz in eight rounds, Nino LaRocca in six, and Colin Jones in four. His next two fights were non-title fights at junior middleweight. He stopped James "Hard Rock" Green in two and Pablo Baez in six.

On December 6, 1985, Curry fought Milton McCrory, the undefeated WBC welterweight champion, to unify the welterweight titles. In the second round, Curry slipped a McCrory left jab and countered with a left hook to the chin that sent McCrory down. McCrory struggled to rise. When he did, Curry dropped him again with a solid right cross. Referee Mills Lane counted him out. Curry became the first undisputed welterweight champion since Sugar Ray Leonard retired in 1982.

Curry's first defense of the undisputed championship was in his hometown of Fort Worth, Texas. His opponent was Eduardo Rodriguez, whom he knocked out in the second round with a left-right combination to the head. Curry was 25–0 with 20 knockouts, and many boxing experts considered him to be the best pound-for-pound boxer in the world.

=== Major upset ===
Curry's next defense of the title was against Lloyd Honeyghan of the United Kingdom on September 27, 1986, in Atlantic City, New Jersey. Honeyghan was 27–0 and ranked #1 by the WBC.

Curry's training was disrupted by managerial issues. His managerial contract with David Gorman was to expire on September 30, 1986, and Curry announced that Akbar Muhammad would become his new manager. Muhammad said he wanted Gorman to remain a part of Curry's team, but Gorman said he wouldn't accept a position as co-manager and would not let Curry work out of his gym if he was not Curry's manager. Curry told Gorman to stay away from his training camp, but shortly before the fight, Curry asked him to work in his corner for the fight and Gorman agreed.

Oddsmakers considered Curry vs. Honeyghan to be such a mismatch that some would not offer a betting line. However, Honeyghan came into the fight with great confidence and bet $5,000 on himself at 5-1 odds. "I want people to know how much I believe in myself," he said. "I can't wait to start punching Curry on the head. I'm going to smash his face in."

Honeyghan easily won the opening two rounds, pressuring Curry and rocking him badly in the second round. Curry came back to win the next two rounds, but he had little left after that. He was drained from struggling to make weight, having to lose 11 pounds three days before the fight. "I was weak and sluggish. I had no strength in my legs, and my timing just wasn't there. I wasn't myself," Curry said after the fight. "I won't fight as a welterweight again."

Akbar Muhammad said Curry weighed 168 pounds six and a half weeks prior to the fight, before he went to New Orleans to train. Then his grandfather's death caused the fighter to lose concentration. "His weight went up to 157, 158. He told me, 'I don't think I can make the weight.' He wanted to pull out of the fight," Muhammad said. "I told him he was a professional and had an obligation to meet."

Honeyghan manhandled Curry in rounds five and six. Late in the sixth, an accidental headbutt opened a bad cut over Curry's left eye. Returning to his corner after the sixth, with blood flowing down his face, Curry shook his head and was heard to tell his corner, "I'm through." Ringside physicians Frank Doggett and Paul Williams examined the cut after the sixth round and told referee Octavio Meyran to stop the fight, giving Honeyghan a TKO victory. The Ring magazine named the fight Upset of the Year.

=== Move up in weight ===
After losing to Honeyghan, Curry moved up to the light middleweight division.

Curry defeated Tony Montgomery to win the USBA light middleweight title on February 7, 1987. Montgomery was disqualified in the fifth round for intentional headbutts. Curry's next opponent, former IBF light middleweight champion Carlos Santos, was also disqualified in the fifth round for intentional headbutts.

On April 6, 1987, the day Sugar Ray Leonard defeated Marvelous Marvin Hagler for the world middleweight championship and two days after defeating Santos, Curry filed a million dollar lawsuit against Leonard and his attorney, Mike Trainer. The suit stated that Leonard and Trainer took "undue and unconscionable advantage of Curry" through fraud, conspiracy and breach of financial responsibilities, and they "conspired to prevent Curry from entering the middleweight divisions to assure Leonard's unobstructed opportunity to fight the middleweight champion."

Curry said he asked Leonard and Trainer for advice concerning his future, and they advised him to stay at welterweight and not to move up in weight to fight WBA light middleweight champion Mike McCallum or middleweight champion Hagler. Curry was going to face McCallum on June 23, 1986, but he decided to back out and stay at welterweight. Several weeks later, Leonard announced that he was coming out of retirement to fight Hagler.

==== McCallum vs Curry ====
Curry fought Mike McCallum on July 18, 1987, for the WBA light middleweight championship. The fight was televised live on HBO. Curry tried to have Sugar Ray Leonard, who worked for HBO as a commentator, removed from the broadcast team, but HBO decided to include Leonard as part of the telecast.

McCallum, 31–0 with 28 knockouts, was boxing's longest reigning champion. Curry, a 2–1 betting favorite, boxed well and was leading on all three scorecards after four rounds. In the fifth, McCallum caught Curry on the chin with a left hook, putting down for the count. "I don't know what he hit me with," Curry said forty minutes after the fight. "I don't know what happened."

HBO commentator Barry Tompkins told his broadcasting partner Sugar Ray Leonard, "You settled a case out of court here."

=== WBC light middleweight champion ===
After outpointing former WBC champion Lupe Aquino, Curry got another title shot. He traveled to Italy to fight Gianfranco Rosi for the WBC light middleweight title on July 8, 1988. Curry put him down five times, and Rosi retired on his stool after the ninth round. "I trained hard for five months to win this title and it paid off," Curry said.

Curry was once again a champion, but his reign didn't last very long. He lost the title in his first defense, dropping a twelve-round unanimous decision to the lightly regarded Rene Jacquot on February 11, 1989, in France. Curry built an early lead, but Jacquot came on in the second half of the fight. "I just got tired," Curry said afterward. "I thought I was in the best condition of my life but in the seventh, eighth and ninth rounds my legs just went." The fight that was named The Ring magazine Upset of the Year.

=== Back-to-back title shots ===
Following two knockout victories, Curry went back to France to fight Lineal/IBF middleweight champion Michael Nunn on October 18, 1990. Although Curry found the target, he didn't have the power to hurt the bigger champion. Nunn dropped Curry with a flurry of unanswered punches in round ten, and the referee stopped the fight.

In his next fight, Curry returned to light middleweight to fight Terry Norris for the WBC title. The fight took place June 1, 1991, in Palm Springs, California. It was a rough and competitive fight for seven rounds. In the eighth, Norris put Curry down for the count with a series of right hands. Norris then hit Curry with an illegal shot whilst Curry was on his knees. Curry later retired after the fight.

=== Legal troubles ===
In April 1994, Curry, along with Darrell Chambers and William "Stanley" Longstreet, was indicted by a federal grand jury in Detroit on drug conspiracy charges. The ten-count indictment charged them with conspiracy to distribute cocaine, possession with intent to distribute cocaine, money laundering and being part of a continuing criminal enterprise. "My God, I don't know anything about this," Curry said. "I'm guilty by association. I've never, never ever had anything to do with drugs. I knew Stanley Longstreet and Darrell Chambers as boxers. I know nothing about any drug ring. I'm stunned."

In January 1995, Curry was acquitted on all charges, Chambers was found guilty and Longstreet took a plea deal. "I have been systematically...lynched and then castrated by, first, the news media, and then by the criminal justice system," Curry said afterward. He also said paying for his legal defense destroyed him financially.

In March 1996, Curry was jailed for failing to pay child support. He won work release soon afterward, but that was revoked after he again failed to make support payments. He served six weeks of a six-month sentence.

=== Return to boxing ===
In need of money, Curry returned to boxing. "This comeback is about a lot of things, but the bottom line is money," he said. "I wouldn't do this if I didn't need the money." Curry's first comeback fight was in Winnipeg, Manitoba, Canada on February 20, 1997. He knocked out Gary Jones in four rounds.

Curry's next fight was against Emmett Linton, who was one of the boxers Curry trained after he retired from boxing. The Linton fight wasn't just about money: It was personal.

Curry had been Linton's manager and trainer. The two had a falling out in 1993. Linton said he didn't like the way Curry was handling his career. Their feud really erupted when Curry accused Linton of giving information to the mother of one of his children about his finances, which Linton denied. The two got into a fight and guns were drawn but not used. Curry filed charges, but they were later dropped. Shortly afterward, Curry went to jail for failure to pay child support.

When Curry started his comeback, he asked promoter Bob Arum to get him a fight with Linton. Knowing that a good feud can sell a fight, Arum made the match. The fight took place at The Aladdin in Las Vegas, Nevada, on April 9, 1997.

Curry was no match for Linton. He was dropped in the first round and took a beating over the next six. Referee Richard Steele stopped the fight in the seventh round. "I just didn't have it," Curry said. "I'm finished. I'll never box again."

After the loss, Curry went to Valley Hospital in Las Vegas and learned that he had fought Linton with acute pancreatitis. "That condition pre-existed the fight," said Phil Hamilton, Curry's manager. "We're thinking maybe that explains why Donald felt so weak during the fight, and why maybe he deserves the chance to fight again."

Curry went back to the gym when he was well. "I hope to give a better account of myself," he said, referring to the Linton fight. "I wasn't in shape and wasn't who I thought I was that night." However, Curry never did fight again. He retired with a record of 34–6 with 25 knockouts.

== Post-career ==
In November 2021, Curry's sons revealed that they believed him to suffer from chronic traumatic encephalopathy, due to memory loss and other mental health issues. Following their appeal on Twitter, the World Boxing Council offered to schedule a brain scan for Curry.

== Professional boxing record ==
| 40 fights | 34 wins | 6 losses |
|---|---|---|
| By knockout | 25 | 5 |
| By decision | 6 | 1 |
| By disqualification | 3 | 0 |

| No. | Result | Record | Opponent | Type | Round, time | Date | Location | Notes |
|---|---|---|---|---|---|---|---|---|
| 40 | Loss | 34–6 | Emmett Linton | TKO | 7 (12), 1:08 | Apr 9, 1997 | The Aladdin, Paradise, Nevada, U.S. | For vacant IBA light middleweight title |
| 39 | Win | 34–5 | Gary Jones | KO | 4 (10), 1:31 | Feb 20, 1997 | Winnipeg, Manitoba, Canada | |
| 38 | Loss | 33–5 | Terry Norris | KO | 8 (12), 2:54 | Jun 1, 1991 | Radisson Resort, Palm Springs, California, U.S. | For WBC light middleweight title |
| 37 | Loss | 33–4 | Michael Nunn | KO | 10 (12), 1:59 | Oct 18, 1990 | Palais Omnisports, Paris, France | For IBF middleweight title |
| 36 | Win | 33–3 | Jose Antonio Martinez | KO | 4 (10), 2:35 | Aug 17, 1990 | Bally's Las Vegas, Paradise, Nevada, U.S. | |
| 35 | Win | 32–3 | Brett Lally | TKO | 2 (10), 0:41 | Dec 26, 1989 | Bally's Las Vegas, Paradise, Nevada, U.S. | |
| 34 | Loss | 31–3 | René Jacquot | UD | 12 | Feb 11, 1989 | Palais des Sports, Grenoble, France | Lost WBC light middleweight title |
| 33 | Win | 31–2 | Mike Sacchetti | TKO | 5 (10), 1:05 | Jan 3, 1989 | Lakefront Arena, New Orleans, Louisiana, U.S. | |
| 32 | Win | 30–2 | Gianfranco Rosi | RTD | 10 (12), 0:01 | Jul 8, 1988 | Portosole, Sanremo, Italy | Won WBC light middleweight title |
| 31 | Win | 29–2 | Lupe Aquino | UD | 12 | Jan 3, 1988 | Palasport, Genoa, Italy | |
| 30 | Win | 28–2 | Rigoberto Lopez | KO | 4 (10), 1:54 | Dec 8, 1987 | Country Club, Reseda, California, U.S. | |
| 29 | Loss | 27–2 | Mike McCallum | KO | 5 (15), 1:14 | Jul 18, 1987 | Caesars Palace, Sports Pavilion, Paradise, Nevada, U.S. | For WBA light middleweight title |
| 28 | Win | 27–1 | Carlos Santos | DQ | 5 (12), 2:25 | Apr 4, 1987 | Caesars Palace, Outdoor Arena, Paradise, Nevada, U.S. | Retained USBA light middleweight title; Santos disqualified for repeated headbutts |
| 27 | Win | 26–1 | Tony Montgomery | DQ | 5 (12), 2:29 | Feb 7, 1987 | Caesars Palace, Paradise, Nevada, U.S. | Won vacant USBA light middleweight title; Montgomery disqualified for repeated headbutts |
| 26 | Loss | 25–1 | Lloyd Honeyghan | RTD | 6 (12), 3:00 | Sep 27, 1986 | Caesars Hotel & Casino, Atlantic City, New Jersey, U.S. | Lost WBA, WBC, IBF, and The Ring welterweight titles |
| 25 | Win | 25–0 | Eduardo Rodriguez | KO | 2 (15), 2:29 | Mar 9, 1986 | Will Rogers Coliseum, Fort Worth, Texas, U.S. | Retained WBA, WBC, IBF and The Ring welterweight titles |
| 24 | Win | 24–0 | Milton McCrory | KO | 2 (15), 1:53 | Dec 6, 1985 | Las Vegas Hilton, Winchester, Nevada, U.S. | Retained WBA and IBF welterweight titles; Won WBC and vacant The Ring welterweight titles |
| 23 | Win | 23–0 | Pablo Baez | TKO | 6 (10), 1:40 | Jun 22, 1985 | Trump Casino Hotel, Atlantic City, New Jersey, U.S. | |
| 22 | Win | 22–0 | James Green | TKO | 2 (10), 0:40 | Mar 30, 1985 | Moody Coliseum, Dallas, Texas, U.S. | |
| 21 | Win | 21–0 | Colin Jones | TKO | 4 (15), 0:36 | Jan 19, 1985 | National Exhibition Centre, Birmingham, England | Retained WBA and IBF welterweight titles |
| 20 | Win | 20–0 | Nino La Rocca | KO | 6 (15), 1:27 | Sep 22, 1984 | Chapiteau de l'Espace, Fontvielle, Monaco | Retained WBA and IBF welterweight titles |
| 19 | Win | 19–0 | Elio Diaz | RTD | 7 (15), 3:00 | Apr 21, 1984 | Will Rogers Coliseum, Fort Worth, Texas, U.S. | Retained WBA and IBF welterweight titles |
| 18 | Win | 18–0 | Marlon Starling | UD | 15 | Feb 4, 1984 | Bally's Park Place, Atlantic City, New Jersey, U.S. | Retained WBA welterweight title; Won inaugural IBF welterweight title |
| 17 | Win | 17–0 | Roger Stafford | TKO | 1 (15), 1:42 | Sep 3, 1983 | Stadio Antonino Lombardo Angotta, Marsala, Italy | Retained WBA welterweight title |
| 16 | Win | 16–0 | Jun-Suk Hwang | UD | 15 | Feb 13, 1983 | Tarrant County Convention Center, Fort Worth, Texas, U.S. | Won vacant WBA welterweight title |
| 15 | Win | 15–0 | Marlon Starling | SD | 12 | Oct 23, 1982 | Convention Hall, Atlantic City, New Jersey, U.S. | Retained NABF welterweight title; Won USBA welterweight title |
| 14 | Win | 14–0 | Adolfo Viruet | UD | 10 | Jul 10, 1982 | The Great Gorge Playboy Club Hotel, McAfee, New Jersey, U.S. | |
| 13 | Win | 13–0 | Jake Torrance | DQ | 4 (10), 1:07 | Jun 15, 1982 | Hyatt Regency Hotel, Nashville, Tennessee, U.S. | Torrance disqualified for repeated holding |
| 12 | Win | 12–0 | Bruce Finch | TKO | 4 (12), 1:10 | May 4, 1982 | Caesars Palace, Paradise, Nevada, U.S. | Won NABF welterweight title |
| 11 | Win | 11–0 | Mike Senegal | TKO | 10 (10), 2:05 | Mar 10, 1982 | Civic Center, Lake Charles, Louisiana, U.S. | |
| 10 | Win | 10–0 | Curtis Ramsey | UD | 10 | Nov 26, 1981 | Hacienda, Paradise, Nevada, U.S. | |
| 9 | Win | 9–0 | Vernon Lewis | TKO | 1 (10), 1:09 | Oct 29, 1981 | Will Rogers Coliseum, Fort Worth, Texas, U.S. | |
| 8 | Win | 8–0 | Eddie Casper | TKO | 1 (6) | Aug 22, 1981 | Showboat Hotel and Casino, Las Vegas, Nevada, U.S. | |
| 7 | Win | 7–0 | Eddie Campbell | KO | 6 (8) | Jul 2, 1981 | Playboy Hotel and Casino, Atlantic City, New Jersey, U.S. | |
| 6 | Win | 6–0 | Joe Moliere | TKO | 1 (8), 2:40 | May 28, 1981 | Hacienda, Paradise, Nevada, U.S. | |
| 5 | Win | 5–0 | Danny Favella | TKO | 5 (10), 2:06 | Apr 23, 1981 | Will Rogers Coliseum, Fort Worth, Texas, U.S. | |
| 4 | Win | 4–0 | Rigoberto Lopez | TKO | 2 (6) | Mar 26, 1981 | Hacienda, Paradise, Nevada, U.S. | |
| 3 | Win | 3–0 | Jerry Reyes | TKO | 2 | Feb 26, 1981 | Hacienda, Paradise, Nevada, U.S. | |
| 2 | Win | 2–0 | Juan Ramirez | TKO | 2 (6), 2:17 | Jan 16, 1981 | HemisFair Arena, San Antonio, Texas, U.S. | |
| 1 | Win | 1–0 | Mario Tineo | TKO | 1 | Dec 26, 1980 | Caesars Palace, Paradise, Nevada, U.S. | |

== Titles in boxing ==
=== Major world titles ===
- WBA welterweight champion (147 lbs)
- WBC welterweight champion (147 lbs)
- IBF welterweight champion (147 lbs)
- WBC light middleweight champion (154 lbs)

=== The Ring magazine titles ===
- The Ring welterweight champion (147 lbs)

=== Regional/International titles ===
- NABF welterweight champion (147 lbs)
- USBA welterweight champion (147 lbs)
- USBA light middleweight champion (154 lbs)

=== Undisputed titles ===
- Undisputed welterweight champion

== See also ==
- Notable boxing families
- List of world welterweight boxing champions
- List of world light-middleweight boxing champions

== Notes ==
Sporting positions
Amateur boxing titles
| Previous: Thomas Hearns | U.S. light welterweight champion 1978 | Next: Lemuel Steeples |
| Previous: Roger Leonard | U.S. welterweight champion 1979 | Next: Gene Hatcher |
| Previous: Mike McCallum | Golden Gloves welterweight champion 1980 | Next: Manuel Vallejas |
Regional boxing titles
| Preceded by Bruce Finch | NABF welterweight champion May 4, 1982 – February 1983; Vacated | Vacant Title next held by Marlon Starling |
| Preceded by Marlon Starling | USBA welterweight champion October 23, 1982 – February 1983; Vacated | Vacant Title next held by Marlon Starling |
| Vacant Title last held by Duane Thomas | USBA light middleweight champion February 7, 1987 – July 1987; Vacated | Vacant Title next held by Robert Hines |
World boxing titles
| Vacant Title last held by Sugar Ray Leonard | WBA welterweight champion February 13, 1983 – September 27, 1986 | Succeeded by Lloyd Honeyghan |
| Inaugural champion | IBF welterweight champion February 4, 1984 – September 27, 1986 | Succeeded by Lloyd Honeyghan |
| Preceded by Milton McCrory | WBC welterweight champion December 6, 1985 – September 27, 1986 | Succeeded by Lloyd Honeyghan |
| Vacant Title last held by Sugar Ray Leonard | The Ring welterweight champion December 6, 1985 – September 27, 1986 | Succeeded by Lloyd Honeyghan |
| Vacant Title last held by Sugar Ray Leonard | Undisputed welterweight champion December 6, 1985 – September 27, 1986 | Succeeded by Lloyd Honeyghan |
| Preceded by Gianfranco Rosi | WBC light middleweight champion July 8, 1988 – February 11, 1989 | Succeeded by René Jacquot |
