= Michael J. B. Duff =

British computer scientist

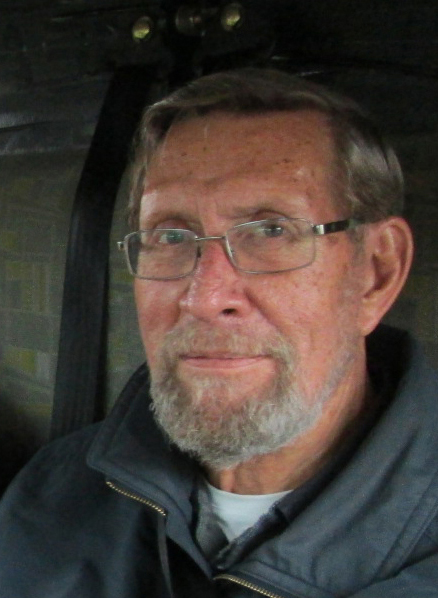
- Duff in 2014
- Born: 17 January 1933
- Died: 29 December 2021 (aged 88)
- Citizenship: British
- Education: University College London
- Scientific career
- Fields: Physics, computer science
- Workplaces: University College London

Michael J. B. Duff FIEE FIAPR (17 January 1933 - 29 December 2021) was a British physicist and computer scientist known for his pioneering work in early computer vision systems and image-processing hardware architectures. He was a Professor of Applied Physics at University College London (UCL), where he led research in image processing and developed early parallel computing systems for visual data analysis.

== Career ==
As a research student in the UCL Department of Physics from 1953 to 1956, Duff worked on designing a fast recycling high pressure cloud chamber. He then spent two years at EMI's infra-red group before returning to UCL as a research assistant in the Automatic Methods Group developing 'Digiscat' to measure the scattering of particle tracks in nuclear emulsions, bubble and spark chamber photographs. He became a lecturer in 1962, working in computer vision and image processing, and later led the UCL Image Processing Group. distinguished British physicist and computer scientist. He was one of the early academic lecturers who travelled to Nigeria under the VISTA scheme around 1965 to teach at the University of Ibadan.

In 1967, he developed the UCPR1 image-processing computer, an early system designed for automated visual data processing. Between 1971 and 1975 he oversaw Science Research Council-funded research into parallel processing networks, collaborating with scientists at the Laboratorio di Cibernetica (the Institute of Cybernetics of the Italian National Research Council) in Naples, the University of Maryland in the US, and the University of Sao Paulo in Brazil. Further grants in 1976 and 1978 supported the development of multiprocessor vision systems known as the CLIP (Contextual Linked Image Processing) architectures, including CLIP0 through CLIP7. These systems explored parallel processing approaches to computer vision; CLIP4 was later produced commercially.

Duff, appointed Professor of Applied Physics in 1985, received the British Computer Society Technical Award in the same year for contributions to computer vision systems. He was made a Fellow of the Institution of Electrical Engineers (FIEE) in 1981 and a Fellow of the International Association for Pattern Recognition (FIAPR) in 1994.

In 2026, he was posthumously awarded the IAPR Distinguished Service Award. His wife Susan received one the same year for her management of the IAPR Secretariat and for her 10yrs work as newsletter layout editor.

== Professional activities ==
Duff contributed to the development of British and international pattern recognition communities. He was organising secretary of the national Pattern Recognition Group, formed in 1967, which met regularly at UCL. The group became the British Pattern Recognition Association in 1976 and in 1990 merged with the Alvey Vision Club to become the British Machine Vision Association (BMVA). In 2000, he was named the first Distinguished Fellow of the BMVA.

He served as Secretary of the International Association for Pattern Recognition (IAPR) for four years and was President of the IAPR from 1990 to 1992. He was editor-in-chief of the IAPR newsletter from 1999 to 2002. His wife Susan managed the IAPR secretariat from 1992 to 2004.

== Publications ==
Duff authored numerous works about image processing systems and related matters, including a book:

- Duff, Michael (1983). Computing Structures for Image Processing. Academic Press.

Selected other works include:

- M.J.B. Duff, B.M. Jones, L.J. Townsend, "Parallel processing pattern recognition system UCPR1", in Nuclear Instruments and Methods, Volume 52, Issue 2, 1967, Pages 284-288, https://doi.org/10.1016/0029-554X(67)90232-7
- M. J. B. Duff, "Review of the CLIP image processing system," in Managing Requirements Knowledge, International Workshop on, ANAHEIM, 1978, pp. 1055, doi: 10.1109/AFIPS.1978.166.
- Duff, M.J.B. (1981). "The Elements of Digital Picture Processing", in: Onoe, M., Preston, K., Rosenfeld, A. (eds) Real-Time Parallel Computing. Springer, Boston, MA. https://doi.org/10.1007/978-1-4684-3893-2_1
- Wood, A. M., Duff, M. J. B. (Ed.), & Levialdi, S. (Ed.) (1981). "The Interaction between Hardware, Software, and Algorithms", in Languages and Architectures for Image Processing (pp. 1-11). Academic Press.
- Taylor, CJ., Kittler, J. (Ed.), & Duff, MJB. (Ed.) (1985). "Serial architectures for image processing". In Image Processing System Architecture (pp. 39-48). Research Studies Press.
- M J B Duff, "The Clip parallel processor", The Computer Bulletin, Volume 27, Issue 4, December 1985, Pages 26–27, https://doi.org/10.1093/combul/27.4.26
- Duff, M.J.B. (2001). "Thirty Years of Parallel Image Processing", in: Palma, J.M.L.M., Dongarra, J., Hernández, V. (eds) Vector and Parallel Processing — VECPAR 2000. VECPAR 2000. Lecture Notes in Computer Science, vol 1981. Springer, Berlin, Heidelberg. https://doi.org/10.1007/3-540-44942-6_35

== Personal life ==
Married Susan (nee Jones) in 1963. Daughter Charlotte and son Robert. Four grandchildren - Harry, Sam, Rachel and Sophie.
