= Kirkland Laing =

Jamaican-British boxer (1954–2021)

Personal information
- Nickname: The Gifted One
- Nationality: British
- Born: 20 June 1954 Jamaica
- Died: 9 June 2021 (aged 66) Hornsea, East Yorkshire, England, UK
- Weight: Welterweight

Boxing career
- Stance: Orthodox

Boxing record
- Total fights: 56
- Wins: 43
- Win by KO: 24
- Losses: 12
- Draws: 1
- No contests: 0

Kirkland Laing (20 June 1954 – 9 June 2021) was a Jamaican-born, British welterweight boxer nicknamed The Gifted One.

Laing fought 56 times in a twenty-year career, the highlight of which was a shock split decision win over Roberto Durán in September 1982. The fight was selected as Ring Magazine's upset of the year. He was a two-time winner of the British welterweight title and won the EBU welterweight title in 1990, with a second round knockout of Antoine Fernandez at the Wembley Conference Centre.

== Early life ==
Laing was born in Jamaica in 1954. Shortly before his birth, his mother Louise fell off a bicycle. As a result Laing had some developmental difficulties resulting in difficulty walking before the age of five. He also attributed his unconventional boxing stance to this early trauma. He grew up in Nottingham, UK.

== Career ==
Kirkland showed early promise. In May 1972, he beat Vernon Sallas, claiming the 1972 Amateur Boxing Association British featherweight title, when boxing out of the Clifton ABC. His dream was to box in the Olympics like his hero Muhammad Ali, though was not selected to compete in the Munich Games that year. Within the next four years he had turned professional and trained at the renowned Lawless's gym.

=== The Gifted One ===
Laing was nicknamed "The Gifted One". His stance was famously "hands down" and wide legged, which left him open to strikes from his opponents, though also gave him the perfect balance to bob and weave out of harm's way. In this way he won against the favourite Duran in 1982, which should have been a pivotal point in his career. However, he struggled to cope with the pressure of success and instead turned to cannabis.

Laing's boxing career was sporadic, as he often failed to deliver on his promise, appearing under-prepared against less able fighters and engaging in drink, drugs and gambling. In the year following his victory over Durán, Laing went missing, blowing his earnings. In that same period Durán was to fight four times, earning an estimated $6m.

He lost a fight for the European Welterweight title in 1989, but won it a year later by defeating Antoine Fernandez with a knock out in the second round. This was his highest achievement.

Laing continued to fight until he was 40, and retired after a stoppage loss to future world champion Glenn Catley. After retiring, Laing continued to live in Hackney, and fell from his balcony in 2003 in circumstances that remain unexplained. Shortly after a BBC documentary by Steve Bunce (made before the fall) was aired. The short film showed Laing to be living life on the streets, although others who know him questioned the piece's accuracy.

In 2009, Oliver Jarrat released the book "The Gifted One" Kirkland Laing Through the Eyes of Others, a detailed account of Laing's life and career which took the author six years to research and complete. The book contains many insights from people who were close to the fighter including former managers, trainers and opponents he faced at both amateur and professional level.

In 2015, a portrait of Laing by photographer Chris Moyse was acquired by the National Portrait Gallery, London.

Laing lived in a care home in Blidworth, near Nottingham, before his death on 9 June 2021.

Achievements
Preceded by Henry Rhiney	British Welterweight Champion; 4 April 1979 – 1 April 1980	Succeeded by Colin Jones
Preceded by Lloyd Honeyghan; Vacated	British Welterweight Champion; 14 March 1987 – 16 January 1991	Succeeded by Del Bryan
Preceded by Antoine Fernandez	EBU Welterweight Champion; 9 May 1990 – 14 November 1990	Succeeded by Patrizio Oliva
Awards
Previous: Roger Stafford W10 Pipino Cuevas	KO Magazine Upset of the Year; The Ring Magazine Upset of the Year; W10 Roberto Durán; 1982	Next: Gerrie Coetzee KO10 Michael Dokes
