= Milton McCrory =

American boxer (born 1962)

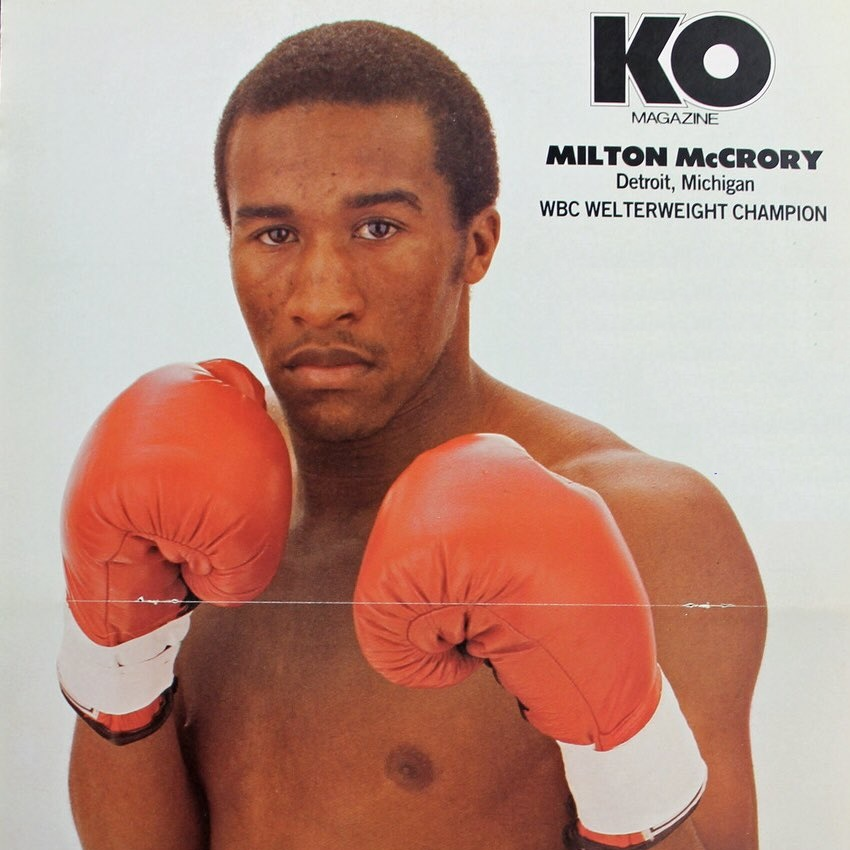
- McCrory c. 1983

Personal information
- Nickname: Ice Man
- Nationality: American
- Born: February 7, 1962 (age 64) Detroit, Michigan, U.S.
- Height: 6 ft 0 in (183 cm)
- Weight: Welterweight; Light middleweight

Boxing career
- Reach: 75 in (191 cm)
- Stance: Orthodox

Boxing record
- Total fights: 40
- Wins: 35
- Win by KO: 25
- Losses: 4
- Draws: 1

Milton McCrory (born February 7, 1962) is an American former professional boxer who was a world champion in the welterweight division.

== Amateur career ==
Milton had a reported amateur record of 105–15. He lost in the 1979 National AAU finals to Lemuel Steeples and in the Olympic Trials to Johnny Bumphus.

== Personal life ==
McCrory is the brother of former champion Steve McCrory and grew up in Detroit, Michigan. McCrory had dreams of becoming a baseball player but soon developed a passion for boxing. In 1979, he won the welterweight title at the World Junior Championships in Yokohama, Japan.

== Professional career ==
McCrory trained under the legendary Emanuel Steward in the famous Detroit Kronk Gym program. Known as "Ice Man", McCrory turned pro in 1980 and won his first 20 bouts, establishing himself as the unified #1 contender for the welterweight title at the time of Sugar Ray Leonard retirement. He won the vacant WBC belt—and became the first Kronk Detroit-born champion—in a rematch with Colin Jones, drawing with him in the initial matchup. He defended the title four times before losing the belt via KO in a unification match with Donald Curry in 1985. He later moved up to Light Middleweight and challenged Mike McCallum for his WBA Light Middleweight title in 1987, but lost via 10th-round TKO. He retired in 1991 after losing 2 of his last 4 fights. In his last bout, he scored a first-round knockout of Robert Curry.

== Professional boxing record ==
| 40 fights | 35 wins | 4 losses |
|---|---|---|
| By knockout | 25 | 3 |
| By decision | 10 | 1 |
| Draws | 1 | |

Key to abbreviations used for results
| DQ | Disqualification | RTD | Corner retirement |
| KO | Knockout | SD | Split decision / split draw |
| MD | Majority decision / majority draw | TD | Technical decision / technical draw |
| NC | No contest | TKO | Technical knockout |
| PTS | Points decision | UD | Unanimous decision / unanimous draw |

Boxing record
| No. | Result | Record | Opponent | Type | Round(s), time | Date | Location | Notes |
|---|---|---|---|---|---|---|---|---|
| 40 | Win | 35–4–1 | Robert Curry | KO | 1 (10) | 06/04/1991 | Aloha Stadium, Honolulu, Hawaii, U.S. | |
| 39 | Win | 34–4–1 | Mike Sacchetti | UD | 10 (10) | 21/09/1990 | Clarion Hotel Ballroom, Saint Louis, Missouri, U.S. | |
| 38 | Loss | 33–4–1 | Joaquin Velasquez | TKO | 7 (10) | 25/11/1988 | The Palace of Auburn Hills, Auburn Hills, Michigan, U.S. | |
| 37 | Loss | 33–3–1 | Lupe Aquino | MD | 10 (10) | 10/04/1988 | Harrah's Marina, Atlantic City, New Jersey, U.S. | |
| 36 | Win | 33–2–1 | Jerome Kelly | TKO | 2 (10) | 19/11/1987 | Windsor Arena, Windsor, Ontario, Canada | |
| 35 | Win | 32–2–1 | Herman Cavasuela | UD | 12 (12) | 28/10/1987 | Las Vegas Hilton, Outdoor Arena, Winchester, Nevada, U.S. | Retained WBC NABF Light middleweight Title |
| 34 | Loss | 31–2–1 | Mike McCallum | TKO | 10 (15) | 19/04/1987 | Pointe Resort, Phoenix, Arizona, U.S. | For WBA light middleweight title |
| 33 | Win | 31–1–1 | Rafael Corona | TKO | 1 (12) | 07/03/1987 | Cobo Hall, Detroit, Michigan, U.S. | Won NABF Light Middleweight Title |
| 32 | Win | 30–1–1 | Jorge Amparo | UD | 10 (10) | 26/11/1986 | Showboat Hotel and Casino, Las Vegas, Nevada, U.S. | |
| 31 | Win | 29–1–1 | Doug DeWitt | UD | 10 (10) | 13/07/1986 | Showboat Hotel and Casino, Las Vegas, Nevada, U.S. | |
| 30 | Win | 28–1–1 | Keith Adams | UD | 10 (10) | 18/04/1986 | Trump Plaza Hotel and Casino, Atlantic City, New Jersey, U.S. | |
| 29 | Loss | 27–1–1 | Donald Curry | KO | 2 (15) | 06/12/1985 | Las Vegas Hilton, Winchester, Nevada, U.S. | Lost WBC welterweight title For WBA, IBF, and vacant The Ring, welterweight titles |
| 28 | Win | 27–0–1 | Carlos Trujillo | TKO | 3 (12) | 14/07/1985 | Stade Louis II, Fontvieille, Monaco | Retained WBC welterweight title |
| 27 | Win | 26–0–1 | Luis Santana | TKO | 3 (10) | 26/05/1985 | James L. Knight Center, Miami Beach, Florida, U.S. | |
| 26 | Win | 25–0–1 | Pedro Vilella | UD | 12 (12) | 09/03/1985 | Palais omnisports, Bercy, Paris, France | Retained WBC welterweight title |
| 25 | Win | 24–0–1 | Lloyd Taylor | KO | 4 (10) | 04/12/1984 | Resorts International, Atlantic City, New Jersey, U.S. | |
| 24 | Win | 23–0–1 | Gilles Elbilia | TKO | 6 (12) | 15/04/1984 | Cobo Arena, Detroit, Michigan, U.S. | Retained WBC welterweight title |
| 23 | Win | 22–0–1 | Milton Guest | TKO | 6 (12) | 14/01/1984 | Premier Center, Sterling Heights, Michigan, U.S. | Retained WBC welterweight title |
| 22 | Win | 21–0–1 | Colin Jones | SD | 12 (12) | 13/08/1983 | The Dunes, Paradise, Nevada, U.S. | Won vacant WBC welterweight title |
| 21 | Draw | 20–0–1 | Colin Jones | SD | 12 (12) | 19/03/1983 | Reno-Sparks Convention Center, Reno, Nevada, U.S. | For vacant WBC welterweight title |
| 20 | Win | 20–0 | Victor Abraham | PTS | 10 (10) | 10/10/1982 | Cobo Arena, Detroit, Michigan, U.S. | |
| 19 | Win | 19–0 | Roger Stafford | UD | 10 (10) | 10/07/1982 | Phoenix Civic Plaza, Phoenix, Arizona, U.S. | |
| 18 | Win | 18–0 | Pete Ranzany | UD | 10 (10) | 22/04/1982 | Cobo Hall, Detroit, Michigan, U.S. | |
| 17 | Win | 17–0 | Randy Shields | RTD | 7 (10) | 23/01/1982 | Cobo Hall, Detroit, Michigan, U.S. | |
| 16 | Win | 16–0 | Arcadio Garcia | TKO | 3 (10) | 19/11/1981 | Cobo Hall, Detroit, Michigan, U.S. | |
| 15 | Win | 15–0 | Rafael Rodriguez | TKO | 7 (10) | 13/08/1981 | Twenty Grand Showroom, Detroit, Michigan, U.S. | |
| 14 | Win | 14–0 | Steve Hearon | TKO | 8 (10) | Jun 25, 1981 | Astrodome, Houston, Texas, U.S. | |
| 13 | Win | 13–0 | Joey Robles | TKO | 5 (10) | 27/05/1981 | Towne House Hotel, Phoenix, Arizona, U.S. | |
| 12 | Win | 12–0 | Alejo Rodriquez | TKO | 4 (10) | 25/04/1981 | Arizona Veterans Memorial Coliseum, Phoenix, Arizona, U.S. | |
| 11 | Win | 11–0 | Eddie Marcelle | TKO | 2 (10) | 09/04/1981 | Cobo Hall, Detroit, Michigan, U.S. | |
| 10 | Win | 10–0 | Santiago Valdez | TKO | 2 (?) | 19/02/1981 | Cobo Hall, Detroit, Michigan, U.S. | |
| 9 | Win | 9–0 | Inocencio De la Rosa | KO | 1 (10) | 29/01/1981 | Cobo Hall, Detroit, Michigan, U.S. | |
| 8 | Win | 8–0 | Alfonso Hayman | TKO | 3 (10) | 12/12/1980 | Cobo Hall, Detroit, Michigan, U.S. | |
| 7 | Win | 7–0 | Doc Bryant | TKO | 1 (6) | 02/12/1980 | Toledo Sports Arena, Toledo, Ohio, U.S. | |
| 6 | Win | 6–0 | James Dixon | KO | 5 (10) | 22/11/1980 | Riverfront Coliseum, Cincinnati, Ohio, U.S. | |
| 5 | Win | 5–0 | Raul Aguirre | KO | 1 (10) | 08/11/1980 | Cobo Arena, Detroit, Michigan, U.S. | |
| 4 | Win | 4–0 | William Hodge | KO | 1 (8) | 23/10/1980 | Cobo Arena, Detroit, Michigan, U.S. | |
| 3 | Win | 3–0 | Chuck Spicer | KO | 1 (?) | 16/10/1980 | Toledo Sports Arena, Toledo, Ohio, U.S. | |
| 2 | Win | 2–0 | Rodney Kennebrew | KO | 1 (?) | 20/09/1980 | Hiram Bithorn Stadium, San Juan, Puerto Rico | |
| 1 | Win | 1–0 | Calvin Straughter | KO | 1 (6) | 10/09/1980 | Cobo Arena, Detroit, Michigan, U.S. | |

== See also ==
- Kronk Gym
- Notable boxing families
- List of world welterweight boxing champions

Sporting positions
Regional boxing titles
| Vacant Title last held by David Braxton | NABF super welterweight champion March 7, 1987 – 1987; Vacated | Vacant Title next held by Lupe Aquino |
World boxing titles
| Vacant Title last held by Sugar Ray Leonard | WBC welterweight champion August 13, 1983 – December 6, 1985 | Succeeded by Donald Curry |
