= Jarvis Astaire =

English boxing promoter (1923–2021)

Astaire

Jarvis Joseph Astaire, OBE (6 October 1923 – 21 August 2021) was a British sports executive, boxing promoter, and film producer.

== Life and career ==
Astaire was born Joseph Golombovitch in Stepney, East London on 6 October 1923. He was the leading boxing promoter in the United Kingdom from the 1950s to the 1980s. He co-promoted with Harry Levine and matchmaker Mickey Duff. Astaire produced Agatha. He was Consultant to the Sport Division of First Artist Corp. plc from February 2009 on.

For much of the early 1970s Astaire owned a controlling stake in Joint Promotions, the former cartel that was the UK's largest professional wrestling organisation from the early 1950s to the late 1980s and which held a monopoly on television coverage of wrestling on ITV for most of the that period. He would later play a key role in bringing the WWF's SummerSlam '92 event to Wembley Stadium before a crowd of around 80,000.

Astaire died in August 2021, at the age of 97.

His nephew is the writer, film producer, and media advisor Simon Astaire.
