= Derek Roche =

Irish boxer

Personal information
- Nickname: Rebel
- Nationality: Irish
- Born: 19 July 1972 (age 53) New Ross, Ireland
- Height: 5 ft 9 in (175 cm)
- Weight: Welterweight; Light middleweight

Boxing career
- Reach: 72 in (183 cm)
- Stance: Orthodox

Boxing record
- Total fights: 34
- Wins: 29
- Win by KO: 13
- Losses: 5

Derek Roche (born 19 July 1972) is an Irish former professional boxer who competed from 1994 to 2004. He challenged once for the IBO super welterweight title in 2000. At regional level, he held the British welterweight title from 1999 to 2000.

Roche turned professional in September 1994, winning his first fight in Bradford, West Yorkshire, England, in which Roche knocked out Doncaster southpaw Michael Alexander in the final round of a six-round fight on the undercard of a card that included Terrace Gaskin.

Roche lived and fought out of Leeds in England for the majority of his professional career.

Roach remained undefeated in his first 22 fights until 2000, when he faced Harry Dhami, who ended his unbeaten streak, claimed the title, and knocked him down five times.

== See also ==
- List of British welterweight boxing champions
