= Mickey Duff =

Polish-born British boxer, matchmaker, and promoter

Personal information
- Nicknames: Mickey Duff; Adopted as legal name
- Nationality: British
- Born: Monek Prager; June 7, 1929 Tarnów, Poland
- Died: March 22, 2014 (aged 84) South London
- Weight: lightweight

Boxing career
- Stance: Orthodox

Boxing record
- Total fights: 45
- Wins: 33
- Win by KO: 4
- Losses: 8
- Draws: 4

Mickey Duff (7 June 1929 – 22 March 2014), was a Polish-born British boxer, matchmaker, manager and promoter.

== Early life ==
Duff was born Monek Prager to a Jewish family in Tarnów, Poland on 7 June 1929. His father, a rabbi, helped the family flee the Nazis and emigrate to England in the late 1930s.

== Career in boxing ==
=== Four-year career as boxer ===
Duff became a professional boxer aged fifteen, and boxed for four years. According to Mickey, he chose the name Duff from the character, "Jackie-Boy Duffy" from the movie Cash and Carry, though the character actually came from the 1941 boxing movie, Ringside Maisie. The ring name hid his boxing career from his disapproving father, with whom he would have a strained relationship for life, though for other reasons. Starting his career after WWII, from September, 1945, to May, 1946, Duff fought fourteen bouts in the greater London area, winning twelve, with only one loss and one draw. He eventually achieved a 75% winning boxing record in a career that included around fifty fights, but lost his last professional bout on December 7, 1948, against Scottish boxer Neil McCearn, in West Ham, in an eight round points decision. BoxRec, the online boxing record site, lists 46 of his better-publicized bouts.

=== Achievements as boxing promoter, match-maker, and manager ===
After briefly working selling sewing machines, Duff returned to boxing to make matches across the UK. In the late 1950s Jack Solomons was England's greatest boxing promoter. As Solomons' ironclad control of British boxing waned, a new team began to form with Duff as match maker, Jarvis Astaire as manager, and friend and mentor Harry Levene, as promoter. He also had as partners Terry Lawless, Mike Barrett, and the British Broadcasting Company (BBC). One publication described Duff and his partners's ascendancy in the boxing world, as "an efficient cartel which broke one monopoly and established another." Duff became vastly more famous as a manager, matchmaker, and promoter than he was as a London area boxer. His participation and strong position in the sport as a promoter and matchmaker would extend over four decades from 1953 through 1997.

==== Top boxers in his stable ====
During his strong position as a promoter and manager, he was involved with at least 16 world champions and many leading British fighters, including:

- Terry Downes (1961)
- Frank Bruno
- Joe Calzaghe
- Howard Winstone (1968)
- John Conteh (1974)
- Barry McGuigan (1984)
- Lloyd Honeyghan (1986)
- Maurice Hope
- Charlie Magri
- Alan Minter
- John H Stracey
- Jim Watt
- John "The Beast" Mugabi
- Cornelius Boza Edwards.

The clout and connections that Duff could bring to bear from his media contacts, wealth, and professional associations could fast channel a competitors rise to a championship bout. Duff's participation and then dominant place in British boxing lasted through the sixty's, seventies, and most of the eighties.

==== Widely credited media roles ====
Duff became widely known in the media, particularly for the awards he received for his work on HBO Boxing (1973), ESPN Top Rank Boxing (1980), and as a consultant with the movie Triumph of the Spirit (1990). ESPN and HBO, however, would not remain the exclusive, or dominant line to the world and British boxing market.

=== Frank Warren's rise and Duff's fall from prominence ===
By the 1990s, Duff's primary competitor, promoter Frank Warren, had seventy-five boxers in his stable, and could be described accurately by London's Observer as "the only show in town". Equally significant was Warren's 50,000,000 pound deal with Britain's largest pay tv network, Sky TV, British commercial television network, ITV and his direct line to the American TV market through promoter Don King. Duff, who was once the major player in London, saw three of his top fighters, Frank Bruno, Joe Calzaghe, and Henry Akinwande leave him for more profitable deals with Warren, sapping both Duff's financial position and market share. Eventually giving in to diminishing health, loss of his boxing stable, and Frank Warren's dominance through his partnership with ITV and Sky TV, Duff retired.

International Boxing Hall of Fame inductee

== Life outside boxing and death in 2014 ==
He had one child with wife Marie, with whom he remained on good terms after they separated.

He was inducted into the International Boxing Hall of Fame in 1999. After suffering from Alzheimer's disease, Duff died at a nursing home in South London on 22 March 2014 from natural causes at the age of 84.
