= KO Magazine =

American boxing magazine

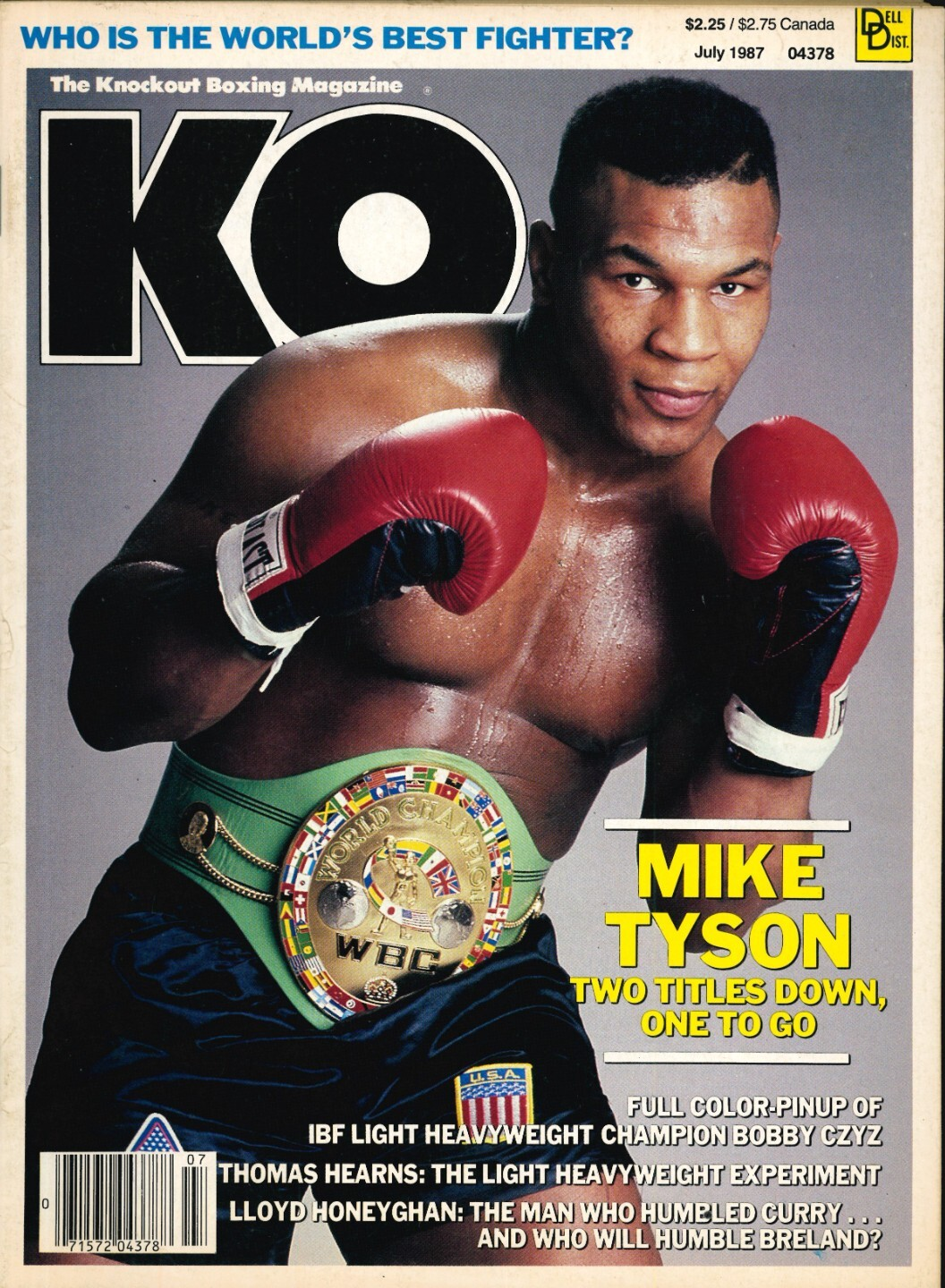
Cover of the July 1987 issue, featuring Mike Tyson

KO Magazine was an American magazine dedicated to professional boxing. It was first published in 1980, to compete with The Ring. It was founded by Stanley Weston, long-time publisher of numerous boxing and pro wrestling titles.

== History ==
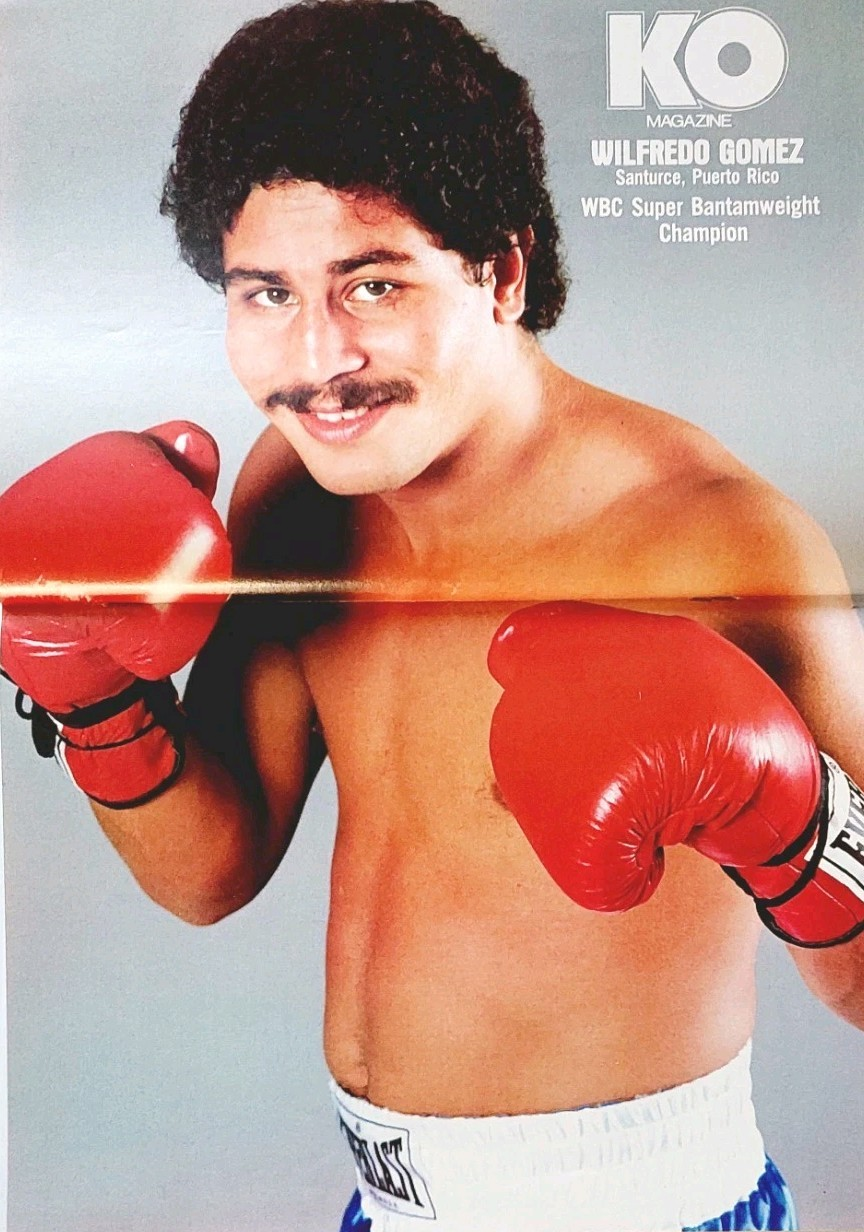
A poster of Puerto Rican boxer Wilfredo Gómez on KO Magazine's April 1983 issue

KO Magazine was published bimonthly from 1980 to 1982, monthly from 1982 to 2000, bimonthly from 2001 to 2003, quarterly in 2004, and three times a year from 2005 to 2007. Weston wanted KO to stand out above all other boxing magazines on the market, including the ones he published. It was meant to be a rival to The Ring and outsold that magazine for years. Peter King was editor from KO's founding until his departure from the company in 1987.

== Features and contributors ==
KO Magazine, nicknamed "The Knockout Boxing Magazine", ran some popular features, such as a round-by-round section where the most important fights were described punch by punch, posters with the boxer's complete records on the back, rankings in 12 weight classes compiled by the editors, and a question and answer interview section and letters from fans ("Between Rounds"). Each issue also included l, a color centerfold and an "International Report" which featured match results from around the world.

Contributing writers included long-time boxing reporters Al Bernstein and Richard Hoffer. Other key staff members included Steven Farhood, Richard Countis, Stu Saks, Jeff Ryan, Bill Apter and Ken Morgan.

In September 2007, KO Magazine was acquired by Golden Boy Enterprises, along with The Ring. KO Magazine ceased publication following the acquisition.
