= Boxing in the 1980s =

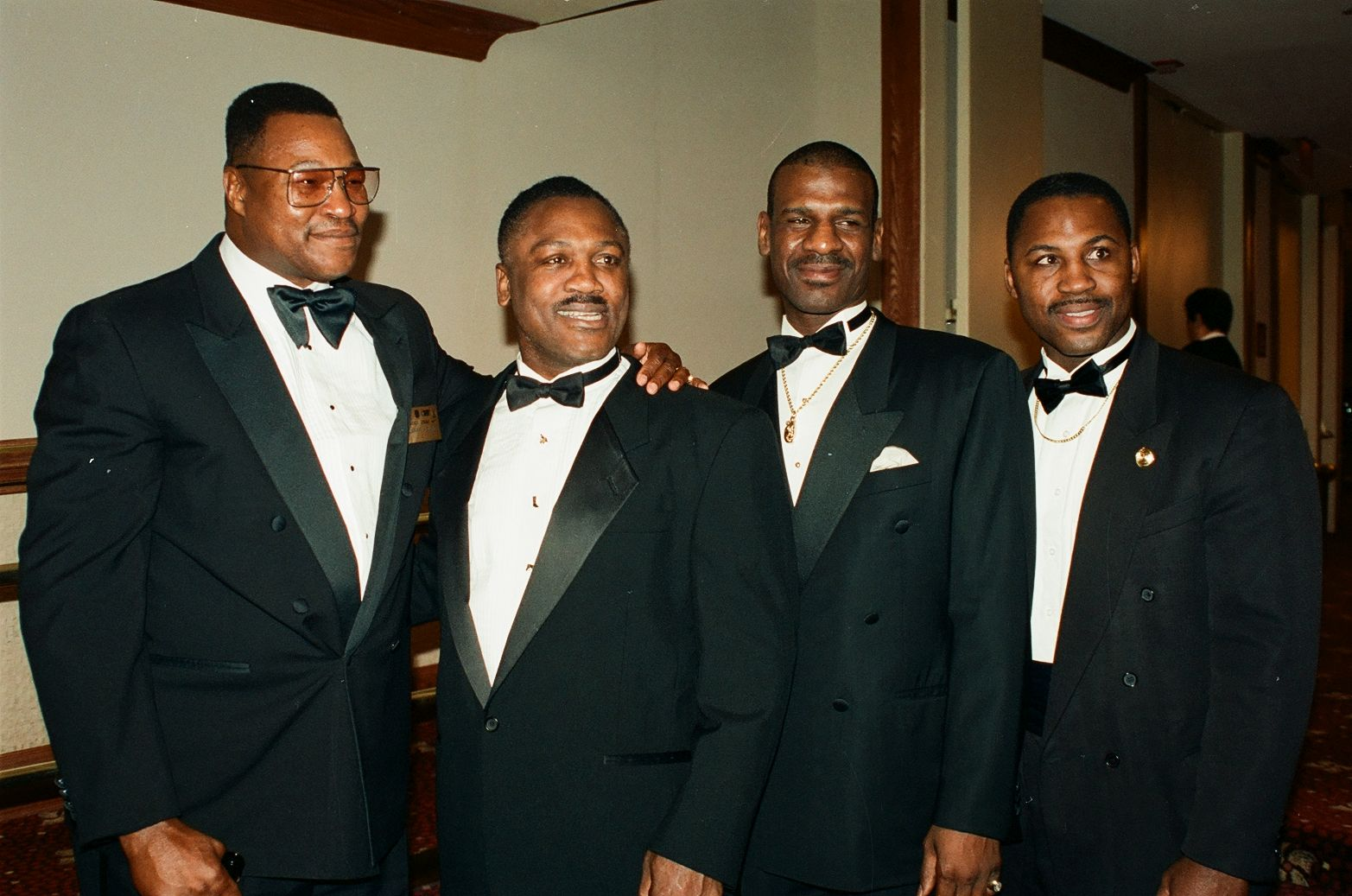
Larry Holmes, Joe Frazier, Michael Spinks and Marvis Frazier

Boxing in the 1980s was filled with important fights, events and personalities that shaped the sport. Boxing in the 1980s was shaped by many different situations, such as the continuous corporate battles between the different world sanctioning organizations, the void left by Muhammad Ali as the sport's ambassador and consequent search for a new boxing hero, the continuous presence of Don King as the sport's most famous promoter, the surge of rival promoters as Bob Arum, Butch Lewis and Murad Muhammad, and major rule changes. In 1986, Mike Tyson emerged as a fresh new face in the heavyweight division, which had seen a decline in champion quality level (particularly in the WBA side) after Ali's retirement and, later on, after longtime WBC ruler Larry Holmes' prime. In addition, the IBF and WBO began operating.

Another important aspect of boxing in the 1980s was the rivalry between five world champions: Wilfred Benítez, Roberto Durán, Marvin Hagler, Thomas Hearns and Sugar Ray Leonard. Of all the possible match-ups between these five, Benitez-Hagler was the only one that never happened. The circle of fights between these five gladiators actually began on November 30, 1979, when Leonard beat Benitez by knockout in round fifteen to win the WBC world Welterweight title, on the same night Hagler drew (tied) with Vito Antuofermo in his first bid to become the world's middleweight champion.

== 1980 ==
- February 2 – Salvador Sánchez becomes WBC world Featherweight champion with a fourteenth-round knockout victory over Danny Lopez in Phoenix
- March 21 – Bobby Chacon defeats Rafael Limón by split decision in their third bout
- March 29 – In a rematch from 7 months earlier, Matthew Saad Muhammad knocks out John Conteh in Round 4 to retain his WBC Light Heavyweight Championship at Atlantic City, New Jersey.
- March 31 – Sugar Ray Leonard vs. Dave Boy Green – Sugar Ray Leonard defeats Dave Boy Green by 4th-round KO to retain the WBC and The Ring welterweight titles.
- March 31 – John Tate vs. Mike Weaver – Behind on all three scorecards, Mike Weaver scores a last-minute knockout victory over John Tate to capture the WBA heavyweight title.
- June 20 – Sugar Ray Leonard vs. Roberto Durán – Roberto Durán defeats Sugar Ray Leonard by unanimous decision over fifteen rounds in Montreal, Canada to win the WBC and The Ring welterweight titles.
- July 6 – In Bloomington, Minnesota Larry Holmes knocked down Scott LeDoux in the sixth round and then stopped the partially blinded challenger in the seventh round to retain his WBC world Heavyweight crown.
- July 13 – Matthew Saad Muhammad, surviving an incredible beating in the 8th round, comes back to floor Yaqui Lopez four times, stopping him in 14 rounds in Mcafee New Jersey to retain his WBC Light Heavyweight Title.
- August 2 – Pipino Cuevas vs. Thomas Hearns – Thomas Hearns becomes WBA welterweight champion knocking out Pipino Cuevas in two rounds in Detroit. On that same card, Samuel Serrano loses his WBA world Jr. Lightweight crown to Yasutsune Uehara, by knockout in round six.
- September 27 – Marvin Hagler becomes world Middleweight champion, scoring a technical knockout over Alan Minter on cuts in three rounds in London. The boxers then have to be protected by police from rioting Minter fans.
- October 2 – Larry Holmes vs. Muhammad Ali – Larry Holmes retains his WBC heavyweight title with an eleventh-round technical knockout over Muhammad Ali in what would be Ali's final title fight.
- November 25 – Roberto Durán vs. Sugar Ray Leonard II – Known as The No Más Fight, Sugar Ray Leonard regains his WBC world Welterweight title with an eighth-round knockout of Roberto Durán, who quit after telling Octavio Meyran No Más ("No more" in Spanish).
- December 13 – Salvador Sánchez vs. Juan Laporte – Salvador Sánchez defeats Juan Laporte by unanimous decision to retain his WBC featherweight championship

== 1981 ==
- March 28 – Santos Laciar becomes world Flyweight champion for the first time, defeating Peter Mathebula by knockout in round seven to win the WBA title, in Soweto, South Africa.
- March 28 – Sugar Ray Leonard vs. Larry Bonds – Sugar Ray Leonard defeats Larry Bonds by 10th-round technical knockout to retain WBC and The Ring welterweight titles
- April 12 – Larry Holmes defeats Trevor Berbick by unanimous decision to retain the WBC and The Ring heavyweight titles. Former undisputed champion Joe Louis died of cardiac arrest just hours after his last public appearance viewing the bout.
- May 23 – Wilfred Benítez becomes the first Hispanic and Puerto Rican to be a three time world champion, as well as the fifth boxer to do it and the first one to do it since Henry Armstrong four decades before, when he defeats Maurice Hope by knockout in round twelve to win the WBC's world Jr. Middleweight title in Las Vegas
- June 12 – Larry Holmes vs. Leon Spinks – Larry Holmes defeats former undisputed champion Leon Spinks by 3rd-round TKO to retain the WBC and The Ring heavyweight titles. This would be Spinks' last heavyweight title fight.
- June 20 – Alexis Argüello becomes the sixth three time world champion in boxing history when he defeats Jim Watt by decision in fifteen rounds to win the WBC world Lightweight title in London.
- June 25 – Ayub Kalule vs. Sugar Ray Leonard – Sugar Ray Leonard wins the WBA light middleweight title with a ninth-round knockout of Ayub Kalule, becoming a two-division world champion.
- Thomas Hearns defeats Pablo Baez by 4th-round TKO to retain the WBA welterweight title
- August 21 – Salvador Sánchez vs. Wilfredo Gómez – The Battle of the Little Giants – Salvador Sánchez defeats Wilfredo Gómez by knockout in eight rounds to retain his WBC world Featherweight title in Las Vegas.
- September 16 – Sugar Ray Leonard unifies his WBC world Welterweight title with the WBA one by knocking out the WBA's champion Thomas Hearns in round fourteen at Las Vegas.
- October 3 – Alexis Argüello vs. Ray Mancini – Alexis Argüello defeats Ray Mancini by 14th-round TKO to retain the WBC and Ring lightweight titles
- December 3 – Joe Frazier's last fight: He draws after ten rounds with Floyd "Jumbo" Cummings in Chicago.
- December 11 – Muhammad Ali vs. Trevor Berbick – Muhammad Ali loses a ten-round unanimous decision to future WBC World Heavyweight Champion Trevor Berbick in Nassau, Bahamas in what would prove to be his final fight.

== 1982 ==
- January 24 – Eusebio Pedroza retains his WBA world Featherweight title with a fifteen-round unanimous decision over Juan Laporte in Atlantic City. The fight proves controversial: many observers thought they had seen Pedroza commit a large amount of infractions which, in their opinion, could have led to points deductions or disqualification.
- January 30 – Wilfred Benítez vs. Roberto Durán – Wilfred Benítez retains his WBC world light middleweight title with a 15-round unanimous decision over Roberto Durán.
- February 15 – Sugar Ray Leonard vs. Bruce Finch – Sugar Ray Leonard defeats Bruce Finch by 3rd-round TKO to retain the undisputed welterweight championship.
- June 11 – Larry Holmes vs. Gerry Cooney – Larry Holmes retains his WBC world Heavyweight title with a thirteen-round knockout over Gerry Cooney.
- July 21 – Salvador Sánchez retains his WBC world Featherweight title with a fifteenth-round knockout over Azumah Nelson in New York City. It would be Sánchez's last fight.
- August 12 – Salvador Sánchez killed in a car accident in Mexico City, Mexico.
- September 18 – Michael Spinks knocks out Johnny Davis at 2 minutes and 27 seconds of the 9th round to retain his WBA Light Heavyweight Championship in Atlantic City, New Jersey.
- September 21 – The National Football League Players Association launches a strike against the NFL, wiping out seven games. CBS adds additional boxing telecasts during the strike.
- November 9 – Sugar Ray Leonard announces the second of multiple retirements in Baltimore. (Leonard's first retirement came after the 1976 Olympic Games).
- November 12 – The Battle of The Champions, Aaron Pryor retains his WBA world Jr. Welterweight title with a fourteen-round knockout of Alexis Argüello, who was attempting to become boxing's first four division world champion, in Miami.
- November 13 – Tragedy in the ring: Ray Mancini retains his WBA world Lightweight title by knockout in round fourteen in Las Vegas over Duk Koo Kim, who passes away five days later, leading to the instituting of twelve rounds at the most as the mandatory fight distance and mandatory eight counts quickly. It was also the last fight to air as part of strike replacement programming on CBS because of the NFL strike, which ended three days later.
- November 26 – Larry Holmes retains his WBC world Heavyweight title with a fifteen-round unanimous decision over Randall "Tex" Cobb, fight after which Howard Cosell quits as a boxing commentator, disgusted by what he described as mismatches.
- December 3 – The Carnival of Champions: Wilfredo Gómez retains his WBC world Super Bantamweight championship with a fourteen-round knockout over Lupe Pintor and Thomas Hearns becomes the WBC's world Jr. Middleweight champion with a fifteen-round majority decision over Wilfred Benítez.
- December 10 – Michael Dokes defeats Mike Weaver by a controversial 1st-round TKO to win the WBA heavyweight title
- December 12 – Bobby Chacon defeats Rafael Limón by unanimous decision to win the WBC super featherweight title in their fourth and final bout.

== 1983 ==
- January 29 – Roberto Durán vs. Pipino Cuevas – Roberto Durán defeats Pipino Cuevas by 4th-round TKO
- January 31 – In the first world title fight scheduled for twelve rounds instead of fifteen in various decades, Rafael Orono retains his WBC world Jr. Bantamweight championship with a four-round knockout over Pedro Romero in Caracas, Venezuela.
- March – the IBF surges, becoming boxing's third world sanctioning body.
- March 18 – Michael Spinks vs. Dwight Muhammad Qawi – Michael Spinks defeats Dwight Muhammad Qawi by a unanimous decision in fifteen rounds to unify the WBA and WBC light heavyweight titles.
- May 1 – Edwin Rosario becomes world champion for the first time, winning the WBC world Lightweight title that had been vacated by Alexis Argüello, with a twelve-round unanimous decision over José Luis Ramírez in San Juan, Puerto Rico.
- May 20 – "The Crown Affair" billed as the first heavyweight champion double header saw WBA titist Michael Dokes draw Mike Weaver in their rematch followed by WBC and The Ring champion Larry Holmes defeating Tim Witherspoon by split decision.
- June 16 – Davey Moore vs. Roberto Durán – On his 32nd birthday, Roberto Durán becomes a three-division world champion by knocking out WBA light middleweight champion Davey Moore in eight rounds.
- August 7 – Héctor Camacho wins his first of several world titles, knocking out Rafael Limón in five rounds to win the vacant WBC Jr. Lightweight title in San Juan.
- September 1 – Tragedy strikes again: Alberto Davila wins the vacant WBC world Bantamweight championship with a twelve-round knockout over Kiko Bejines, who dies three days later.
- September 9 – Aaron Pryor vs. Alexis Argüello II – Aaron Pryor retains his WBA world light welterweight title with a tenth-round knockout over Alexis Argüello.
- September 23 – Michael Dokes vs. Gerrie Coetzee – Gerrie Coetzee, becomes the first South African world Heavyweight champion in history, when he defeats Michael Dokes for the WBA championship with a ten-round knockout.
- October 25 – In Puerto Rico, Mike McCallum remains undefeated as he goes 20–0 after a 10-round unanimous decision win over Manuel Jiminez.
- November 10 – Marvin Hagler retains his world Middleweight title with a fifteen-round unanimous decision over Roberto Durán in Las Vegas. Duran was also attempting to become the first four division world champion in history.
- November 25 – Michael Spinks knocks out Oscar Rivadeneyra at 1:42 of the tenth round to retain his WBC and WBA Light Heavyweight titles at Vancouver, Canada.
- December 11 – Larry Holmes vacates the WBC World Heavyweight championship and becomes the first Heavyweight champion recognized by the fledgling International Boxing Federation.
- December 13 – The IBF's first world title fight, as Marvin Camel becomes world Cruiserweight champion for the second time, knocking out Roddy McDonald in five rounds for the IBF's vacant title, in Halifax, Nova Scotia Canada.

== 1984 ==
- January 14 – Ray Mancini defeats Bobby Chacon by 3rd-round TKO to retain the WBA lightweight title
- February 26 – Rocky Lockridge knocked out Roger Mayweather in Round 1 to win the WBA Super Featherweight Championship in Beaumont, Texas.
- March 9 – Tim Witherspoon defeats Greg Page to win the vacant WBC heavyweight title.
- March 30 – Marvin Hagler retains his undisputed world Middleweight title with a tenth-round knockout over Juan Roldán in Las Vegas.
- March 31 – Wilfredo Gómez wins the WBC world Featherweight title, outpointing Juan Laporte in San Juan, Puerto Rico.
- May 11 – Ray Leonard defeats Kevin Howard by 9th-round KO in his first bout in two years. He would retire again in the post-fight press conference.
- June 15 – Thomas Hearns retains his WBC world Jr. Middleweight title with a second-round knockout over Roberto Durán, who had been forced by the WBA to leave his WBA championship vacant before the fight, in Las Vegas.
- August 31 – Pinklon Thomas defeats Tim Witherspoon by majority decision to win the WBC heavyweight title.
- September 13 – Julio César Chávez knocks out Mario Martinez in round eight at Los Angeles, to win the vacant WBC world Jr. Lightweight title, his first of multiple titles.
- November 3 – In a rematch of their 1983 bout, José Luis Ramírez avenges his defeat against Edwin Rosario, knocking him out in four rounds to win the WBC world Lightweight title in San Juan.
- November 15 – at New York's Madison Square Garden, an event called Night of Gold featured 6 American Olympians who competed in the 1984 Summer Olympics and all 6 made their professional debuts Evander Holyfield, Mark Breland, Tyrell Biggs, Virgil Hill, Meldrick Taylor and Pernell Whitaker and all 6 won their bouts.
- December 8 – Azumah Nelson wins his first of multiple titles, knocking out Wilfredo Gómez in eleven rounds at San Juan, to win the WBC world Featherweight title.

== 1985 ==
- March 6 – Future Heavyweight champion Mike Tyson turns pro at 18 years of age. He knocked out Puerto Rican Hector Mercedez in the first round to win his first professional fight.
- April 15 – The War, Marvin Hagler retains his undisputed world Middleweight championship with a three-round knockout over Thomas Hearns in Las Vegas. Round one of their fight is considered the greatest round in history by many.
- April 26 – Six months after becoming a professional fighter, Jeff Fenech wins his first of three world titles, knocking out IBF world Bantamweight champion Satoshi Shingaki in the ninth round at Moore Park, Australia.
- May 19 – Wilfredo Gómez becomes the eighth boxer to win world championships in three divisions, defeating Rocky Lockridge by a fifteen-round majority decision to win the WBA world Jr. Lightweight title in San Juan, Puerto Rico.
- June 8 – Barry McGuigan defeats Eusebio Pedroza by a fifteen-round unanimous decision in London to win the WBA's world Featherweight title.
- June 15 – Pinklon Thomas TKO Mike Weaver in the eighth round to retain the WBC Heavyweight Championship in Las Vegas, Nevada.
- August 10 – José Luis Ramírez vs. Héctor Camacho – Héctor Camacho defeats José Luis Ramírez by 12–round unanimous decision to capture the WBC lightweight title and become a two–division world champion.
- September 21 – Michael Spinks makes history by becoming the first boxer to go from world Light-Heavyweight champion to world Heavyweight champion, defeating IBF ruler Larry Holmes by a fifteen-round unanimous decision in Las Vegas. Julio César Chávez dedicates his successful defense of his WBC world Jr. Lightweight title over Dwight Pratchett in the same boxing card, to the victims of the Mexico City earthquake of September 19.
- November 13 – In his first bout since his trainer Cus D'Amato died, Mike Tyson knocks out Eddie Richardson at 1:17 of the very first round to remain unbeaten at 12–0.
- December 6 – Donald Curry unifies his WBA world Welterweight title with the WBC championship, with a two-round knockout win over WBC world champ Milton McCrory in Las Vegas.

== 1986 ==
- January 17 – Tim Witherspoon defeats Tony Tubbs by a fifteen-round decision in Atlanta, to win the WBA world Heavyweight title and become only the third boxer, after Floyd Patterson and Muhammad Ali, to become two-time world Heavyweight champions. Witherspoon-Tubbs begins Don King's heavyweight unification series that aims to have one universally recognized world champion at the end.
- March 10 – Marvin Hagler retains his undisputed world Middleweight title with an eleventh-round knockout of John Mugabi, Thomas Hearns wins the NABF Middleweight title with a first-round knockout of James Shuler, and Gaby Canizales wins the WBA world Bantamweight title with a seventh-round knockout of Richie Sandoval, who was critically injured and almost died in the days after the fight. The three fights took place in Las Vegas.
- March 22 – James Shuler dies only twelve days after fighting Thomas Hearns, in a motorcycle accident, in Pennsylvania.
- March 22 – In the continuation of Don King's Heavyweight tournament, Trevor Berbick wins the WBC world title with a twelve-round decision over Pinklon Thomas at Las Vegas. In the same boxing card, Carlos De León becomes the first man to be three times Cruiserweight world champion, defeating the WBC world champion Bernard Benton by decision.
- April 19 – Michael Spinks retains his IBF world Heavyweight title by a fifteen-round split decision over Larry Holmes in their Las Vegas rematch, to continue Don King's Heavyweight tournament.
- May 20 – Mike Tyson defeats Mitch Green by 10 round unanimous decision.
- May 24 – Wilfredo Gómez's last world title fight, when he loses his WBA world Jr. Lightweight title to Alfredo Layne, by knockout in round nine, in San Juan, Puerto Rico.
- June 13 – Héctor Camacho retains his WBC world Lightweight title with a twelve-round split decision over fellow Puerto Rican Edwin Rosario at the Madison Square Garden, New York City.
- June 23 – The Triple Header: Thomas Hearns retains his WBC world Jr. Middleweight title with an eighth-round knockout win against former world champion Mark Medal, Roberto Durán loses a ten-round decision to Marvin Hagler's half brother Robbie Sims, and Barry McGuigan loses his WBA world Featherweight title on a fifteen-round unanimous decision to Stevie Cruz.
- July 12 – Evander Holyfield wins his first world title, the WBA's Cruiserweight championship, with a fifteen-round decision over Dwight Muhammad Qawi.
- July 19 – The fourth instalment of Don King's Heavyweight tournament as Tim Witherspoon retains his WBA world title with an eleventh-round knockout of Frank Bruno in London.
- July 26 – Mike Tyson defeats Marvis Frazier by 1st-round KO
- September 6 – Don King's Heavyweight tournament continues as Michael Spinks defeats Steffen Tangstad by a knockout in round four to retain his IBF belt, in Las Vegas.
- September 27 – Lloyd Honeyghan upset Donald Curry by 6th round retirement to win the undisputed welterweight championship.
- November 22 – In the words of HBO Boxing commentator, Barry Tompkins, And we have a new era in Boxing, when Mike Tyson becomes the youngest world heavyweight champion in history, beating Trevor Berbick by knockout in round two to take the WBC world championship as Don King's Heavyweight tournament continues in Las Vegas.
- December 12 – In the next chapter of Don King's Heavyweight tournament, James Smith becomes WBA world Heavyweight champion, defeating Tim Witherspoon by knockout in round one, in New York City.

== 1987 ==
- February 14 – Evander Holyfield defeats Henry Tillman by 7th-round TKO to retain the WBA cruiserweight title
- March 7 – Mike Tyson unifies the WBC and WBA world Heavyweight titles with a twelve-round unanimous decision win over James Smith, in Las Vegas.
- March 9 – Thomas Hearns becomes the ninth boxer in history to win world titles in three divisions, and the first American to do so since Henry Armstrong, knocking out WBC world Light-Heavyweight champion Dennis Andries, born in Guyana but a British resident, in round ten in Detroit. After a 10-year absence George Foreman returns as he beat Steve Zouski by TKO in Round 4 in Sacramento.
- April 6 – In what is considered by many to be the greatest comeback in boxing history, Sugar Ray Leonard comes back after three and a half years without fighting to controversially outpoint Marvin Hagler and win the undisputed world Middleweight championship in Las Vegas. Leonard becomes the tenth boxer in history to be world champion in three different divisions.
- May 15 – Evander Holyfield defeats Rickey Parkey by 3rd-round TKO to unify the WBA and IBF cruiserweight titles
- May 30 – Don King's Heavyweight tournament continues as Tony Tucker defeats Buster Douglas to win the IBF's world Heavyweight title that had been vacated by Michael Spinks, and Mike Tyson retains his WBC and WBA titles with a sixth-round knockout over former world champion Pinklon Thomas in Las Vegas.
- June 15 – Michael Spinks defeats Gerry Cooney by 5th-round TKO to retain The Ring and lineal heavyweight titles
- July 18 – Mike McCallum defeats Donald Curry by 5th-round KO to retain the WBA light middleweight title
- August 1 – The final of Don King's Heavyweight tournament: Mike Tyson defeats Tony Tucker by a twelve-round unanimous decision to become unified WBA/WBA/IBF world heavyweight champion.
- August 15 – Evander Holyfield defeats Ossie Ocasio by 11th-round TKO to retain the WBA and IBF cruiserweight titles
- August 22 – Marlon Starling defeats Mark Breland by 11th-round TKO to win the WBA welterweight title
- October 4 – Wilfredo Vazquez wins the first of three world titles by knocking out WBA world Bantamweight champion Chan-Yong Park in ten rounds at Seoul, South Korea.
- October 16- Mike Tyson retains the unified heavyweight championship against Tyrell Biggs by seventh-round knockout in Atlantic City.
- October 28 – Jorge Vaca dethrones WBC world Welterweight champion Lloyd Honeyghan with a controversial eighth-round technical decision in London. The controversy was that a point deducted to Honeyghan by the referee that night proved to be the margin of difference.
- October 29 – Thomas Hearns makes history, becoming the first boxer in history to win world titles at four different divisions, knocking out Juan Roldán in four rounds for the WBC's vacant world Middleweight title in Las Vegas.
- November 21 – Julio César Chávez defeats Edwin Rosario by 11th-round TKO to win the WBA lightweight title
- December 5 – Evander Holyfield defeats Dwight Muhammad Qawi by 4th-round KO in their rematch to retain the WBA and IBF cruiserweight titles

== 1988 ==
- January 22 – Mike Tyson retains his unified world Heavyweight championship with a fourth-round knockout win against former world champion Larry Holmes in Atlantic City.
- March 4 – At Las Vegas, Nevada Michael Moorer began his professional boxing career with a first-round knockout of Adrian Riggs at 2:26 of that round.
- March 7 – Jeff Fenech becomes the eleventh boxer to win world titles in three different divisions, knocking out former world champion Victor Callejas in ten rounds at Sydney, for the vacant WBC world Featherweight title.
- March 19 – George Foreman defeats Dwight Muhammad Qawi by 7th TKO
- March 21 – Mike Tyson traveled to Japan as he beat Tony Tubbs by TKO in Round 2 to retain his unified world Heavyweight titles.
- March 29 – Lloyd Honeyghan recovers the WBC world Welterweight championship with a third-round knockout of Jorge Vaca in their rematch at London.
- April 9 – Evander Holyfield unifies his WBA world Cruiserweight title with the WBC one, knocking out Carlos De León in eight rounds at Las Vegas.
- April 16 – Marlon Starling draws with Mark Breland in their rematch to retain WBA welterweight title
- June 6 – Iran Barkley conquers the WBC world Middleweight title with a third-round knockout of Thomas Hearns, who had cut Barkley seriously in round two, in Las Vegas.
- June 27 – Mike Tyson won the undisputed world Heavyweight title with a first-round knockout of The Ring and lineal heavyweight champion Michael Spinks in Atlantic City.
- July 16 – In his heavyweight debut Evander Holyfield defeats James Tillis by 5th round retirement
- July 28 – Michael Nunn defeats Frank Tate by 9th-round TKO to win the IBF middleweight title
- July 29 – In an extremely controversial bout, Colombia's Tomas Molinares becomes WBA world Welterweight champion by knocking out Marlon Starling in six rounds in Atlantic City. Starling's camp protested that the knockout punch had landed after the bell to end the round, therefore, it should not have counted. After further review, the WBA agreed with Starling's camp, but decided not to withdraw recognition from Molinares as world champion, despite the result of the bout being changed to a no contest.
- August 4 – The last fifteen rounds bout, as Jorge Páez defeats Calvin Grove by a majority decision to become the IBF's world Featherweight champion, in Mexicali, Mexico.
- October 29 – Julio César Chávez unifies his WBA world Lightweight title with the WBC one, beating his friend and neighbor, José Luis Ramírez, by a technical decision in round eleven in Las Vegas.
- November 4 – Thomas Hearns defeats James Kinchen by majority decision to win the inaugural lightly regarded WBO super middleweight title.
  - Robert Hines defeats Matthew Hilton by unanimous decision to win the IBF Light Middleweight title
  - Michael Nunn defeats Juan Roldán by 8th-round KO to retain the IBF Middleweight title
- November 7 – The first fight in many decades involving titles in two different categories and the WBC world Super Middleweight championship sees Sugar Ray Leonard become boxing's second four division world champion and five division world champion when he knocks out WBC world Light Heavyweight champion Donnie Lalonde in the ninth round, also winning the WBC's vacant Super Middleweight championship, at Las Vegas.
  - Roger Mayweather defeats Vinny Pazienza by unanimous decision to retain WBC Light Welterweight title
- Evander Holyfield defeats Pinklon Thomas by 7th round retirement

== 1989 ==
- February 4 – Marlon Starling defeats Lloyd Honeyghan by 9th-round TKO to win the WBC, The Ring and lineal welterweight titles
- February 11 – Rene Jacquot beat Donald Curry in a twelve-round unanimous decision to win the WBC Light Middleweight Championship in Grenoble, Isere France
- February 24 – Roberto Durán makes history by becoming the third fighter to win world titles in four different divisions, the first Hispanic to do so and also the fighter with the longest period between his first and latest world championships (17 years) when he defeats Iran Barkley by a split decision to become the WBC's world Middleweight champion, in Atlantic City.
- February 25 – Mike Tyson retains his undisputed world Heavyweight championship, with a fifth-round knockout over future world champion Frank Bruno in Las Vegas.
- March 6 – The WBO's first world junior welterweight championship bout, as Héctor Camacho defeats Ray Mancini by unanimous twelve-round decision, to win the WBO's vacant world Jr. Welterweight title and become boxing's twelfth world champion in three different divisions, at Las Vegas.
- March 11 – Evander Holyfield defeats Michael Dokes by 10th-round TKO
- March 25 – Michael Nunn defeats Sumbu Kalambay by 1st-round KO to unify the IBF and The Ring middleweight titles
- May 13 – Julio César Chávez becomes the thirteenth boxer to win world titles in three or more different categories, knocking out Roger Mayweather in ten rounds in their rematch, to win the WBC's world Jr. Welterweight title in Los Angeles.
- May 17 – Carlos De León becomes the first boxer to win the world Cruiserweight title four times (and also joins a handful of champions who have won world titles in one division that many times) when he knocks out Sammy Reeson in nine rounds in London, picking up the WBC belt that had been vacated by his former conqueror, Evander Holyfield, when Holyfield moved to the Heavyweight division.
- June 12 – Sugar Ray Leonard retains his WBC world Super Middleweight title with a twelve-round draw in a rematch with Thomas Hearns in Las Vegas.
- June 21- Mike Tyson retains undisputed heavyweight championship by first-round knockout against Carl Williams in Atlantic City.
- July 8 – John Mugabi who 3 years earlier fought Marvin Hagler for the Undisputed Middleweight Championship, knocks out René Jacquot in the first round to win the WBC Light Middleweight Championship in Cergy-Pontoise, Val-d'Oise, France.
- July 15 – Evander Holyfield defeats Adílson Rodrigues by 2nd-round KO
- August 14 – Michael Nunn defeats Iran Barkley by majority decision to retain the IBF and The Ring middleweight titles
- November 4 – Evander Holyfield defeats Alex Stewart by 8th-round TKO
- December 7 – The decade in boxing finishes almost where it started, as Sugar Ray Leonard defends his WBC world Super Middleweight title with a twelve-round unanimous decision victory over Roberto Durán in their third encounter.
