= Lloyd Honeyghan vs. Marlon Starling =

Boxing match

- Date: February 4, 1989
- Venue: Caesars Palace, Paradise, Nevada, U.S.
- Title(s) on the line: WBC and The Ring welterweight title

Tale of the tape
Boxer	Lloyd Honeyghan	Marlon Starling
Nickname	Ragamuffin Man	The Magic Man
Hometown	London, England	Hartford, Connecticut, U.S.
Purse	$650,000	$250,000
Pre-fight record	33–1 (22 KO)	43–4–1 (1) (26 KO)
Age	28 years, 9 months	29 years, 5 months
Height	5 ft 9 in (175 cm)	5 ft 8 in (173 cm)
Weight	146 1/2 lb (66 kg)	146 lb (66 kg)
Style	Orthodox	Orthodox
Recognition	WBC and The Ring; Welterweight Champion	WBC; No. 3 Ranked Welterweight

Result
- Starling wins by 9th-round technical knockout

Lloyd Honeyghan vs. Marlon Starling was a professional boxing match contested on February 4, 1989, for the WBC welterweight title.

== Background ==
Honeyghan and Starling first met at the unification fight between Donald Curry and Milton McCrory in December 1985 and took an instant disliking to one another. Honeyghan claimed that Starling started insulting him for no reason and Starling claimed that Honeyghan was a big head who thought that he was better than he actually was. Things reached a head at the Sugar Ray Leonard v Donny Lalonde fight in November 1988 when Starling told Honeyghan that he would be the next to be knocked out (referencing his victory over Mark Breland). Honeyghan took exception to his comment and spat at Starling but missed. Starling in retaliation tried to pick up a chair to throw at Honeyghan but thankfully they were bolted to the floor. Starling said "Do you think he would be still fighting if he had spit in my face?"

Honeyghan and Starling, then the WBA and WBC welterweight champions respectively, had previously taken part in a doubleheader event billed as Double Trouble in which both fighters would make a defense of their titles against their respective mandatory challenger. Both Honeyghan and Starling were heavy favorites over their little known challengers, Yung-Kil Jung and Tomás Molinares, and both were expected to win their fights after which they were expected to face one another in a title unification fight. Though Honeyghan would defeat Jung by fifth-round TKO, Starling, however, lost his title to Molinares in controversial fashion as he was knocked out by a punch that Molinares landed after the bell rang. Though originally ruled a knockout victory for Molinares, Larry Hazzard, head of New Jersey State Athletic Control Board, overturned the decision and declared the fight a no contest, however, though he had not officially won the fight, the WBA ruled in favor of Molinares keeping the WBA welterweight title.

Though no longer in possession of the WBA welterweight title, Starling nevertheless continued negotiations with Honeyghan and the a fight between the two was ultimately made official in early January 1989 to take place the following month on February 4. Starling had turned down a deal prior to the Molinares fight that would've guaranteed him a $800,000 payday to fight Honeyghan in hopes that he would receive a $1,000,000 purse instead, however, because he had lost his title to Molinares, Starling was forced to accept a much lower offer of $250,000 while Honeyghan received $650,000.

Originally, Honeyghan–Starling bout was to be co-headlined with Molinares making his first WBA welterweight title defense against former welterweight champion Mark Breland, who was the WBA's number-one welterweight contender. Molinares pulled out of the fight and vacated the title only days after the event was announced with his manager citing "severe mental depression." Instead, Breland was matched up against Seung Soon Lee, the WBA's number-two ranked welterweight, for the now vacant title.

== The Fight ==
There was genuine bad blood between the two fighters. Honeyghan said before the fight "This is a hate match, not a grudge match because he hates me and I hate him." Starling said "There are quite a few things that I don't like about Lloyd Honeyghan and one is, that he is disrespectful to anyone who isn't Lloyd Honeyghan." He also said "You are going to see a ring veteran against an amateur."

Honeyghan started the fight as the betting favourite to win with odds of 2-1. He had stopped Don Curry who had beaten Starling twice on points and Johnny Bumphus who had beaten Starling on a technical decision, after the fight between them had been stopped due to a cut caused by an accidental headbutt.

The fight started at a fast pace with Honeyghan throwing all caution to the wind, launching an all out attack against Starling who was protected by his high Peek-a-boo guard. In his attempt to get to Starling, Honeyghan left his head exposed and was caught and rocked by counterpunches from Starling in the first round. Honeyghan threw 104 punches in round one but only landed 20. In contrast Starling threw 55 punches but landed with 18. He was taking most of Honeyghan's punches on his arms and gloves.

Round two continued in a similar fashion with Honeyghan being the aggressor and throwing a lot of punches and trying to go more to Starlings body. Honeyghan threw 115 punches but only 18 landed, with Starling taking most of them on his arms. Starling landed cleanly to Honeyghan's head and won the round of two judges scorecards. Honeyghan's corner had told him to pick his punches but he was winging them in from all angles because he let his aggression get the better of him.

In round three Honeyghan's frustration at not being able to land a clean punch got the better of him and he began to throw some wild roundhouse punches which missed by a wide margin, whilst Starling picked him off with counterpunches. Towards the end of the round Starling began showboating and taunting Honeyghan who managed to land a big looping right hand on the top of Starling's head which momentarily wobbled him. Starling managed to cover up and the bell came to his rescue. All three judges gave the round to Honeyghan.

In the fourth round Starling took control of the fight and gave Honeyghan a boxing lesson. He managed to evade most of his punches and catch Honeyghan with sharp counterpunches. Honeyghan said that Starling caught a nerve on the right-hand side of his face and for the rest of the fight it felt like he was being stabbed in the face with a knife. Honeyghan's corner told him that he couldn't have a war and that he had to fight smarter.

In the fifth round Honeyghan tried to box, but was pinned on the ropes by Starling and caught with some hard punches. At the end of the round Honeyghan tried to showboat and Starling pounced on him straight away, knocking his gum shield into the crowd. Round six followed much the same pattern with Honeyghan trying to jab and move but being hit frequently by Starling. Round seven followed the same pattern with Honeyghan running around the ring being followed by Starling who was now the aggressor.

Honeyghan's corner told him that he was way behind on the judge's scorecards and that he needed to start getting into the fight. They told him to stand his ground and pick his punches. Honeyghan tried but was fatigued from his earlier efforts and was hit by numerous punches from Starling who sensed that the end was near. The right side of Honeyghan's face began to swell dramatically, reminiscent of the swelling Muhammad Ali suffered against Joe Frazier in their first fight. The ringside doctor inspected Honeyghan's jaw to see if it was broken but the fight was allowed to continue.

The end came in round nine shortly after Starling had scored the fight's only knockdown, backing Honeyghan onto the ropes and landing a flurry of punches which forced an exhausted and despairing Honeyghan to sink down on to his knees. Though Honeyghan got up quickly, Starling once again went on the attack and backed him into a corner. After Starling landed a brief barrage on an exhausted Honeyghan, whose right eye and cheek were grotesquely swollen, referee Mills Lane decided to stop the fight at 1:19 of the round.

== Aftermath ==
Two weeks after the fight, Honeyghan's post-fight drug test yielded a positive result for the pain-killing drug lidocaine, which Honeyghan had not cleared with the Nevada State Athletic Commission. He had the painkiller injected into his fists prior to the contest, so that he could throw punches without being in pain. As he had damaged both hands in the past and was beginning to develop arthritis in his right hand. Though the commission threatened Honeyghan with a suspension for the infraction, they only issued him a $1,500 fine and Honeyghan returned to the ring that August. Honeyghan was never the same fighter after this fight and the saying that one bad beating can ruin a fighter, seemed to apply to him. He went on to fight Mark Breland for the WBA title but seemed to be devoid of any punch resistance and was knocked down a total of six times before the fight was stopped. Twice being knocked down by jabs, which is unusual for a world class fighter.

== Fight card ==
Confirmed bouts:

Weight Class	Weight		vs.		Method	Round	Notes
Welterweight	147 lbs.	Marlon Starling	def.	Lloyd Honeyghan	TKO	9/12	^{Note 1}
Welterweight	147 lbs.	Mark Breland	def.	Seung Soon Lee	TKO	1/12	^{Note 2}
Welterweight	147 lbs.	Rafael Pineda	def.	Vernon Buchanan	TKO	4/10
Middleweight	160 lbs.	John Mugabi	def.	Francisco Carballo	UD	2/10
Welterweight	147 lbs.	Carl Daniels	def.	Matt Trejo	UD	4/4
Super Featherweight	130 lbs.	Eddie Hopson	def.	Marcos Covarrubias	UD	4/4
Middleweight	160 lbs.	Willie Monroe	def.	Keheven Johnson	TKO	2/4

^Note 1 For WBC Welterweight title
^Note 2 For WBA Welterweight title

== Broadcasting ==
Country	Broadcaster
United Kingdom	BBC
United States	HBO

Preceded by vs. Yung-Kil Chung	Lloyd Honeyghan's bouts 4 February 1989	Succeeded by vs. Delfino Marin
Preceded by vs. Tomás Molinares	Marlon Starling's bouts 4 February 1989	Succeeded by vs. Young Kil Jung
