= Bretland =

Bretland is a surname. Notable people with the surname include:

- Barrie Bretland (1928–1998), Australian rules footballer
- John Bretland Farmer (1865–1944), British botanist
- Joseph Bretland (1742–1819), English minister

== See also ==
- Britland (surname)
- Breeland, a surname
- Great Britain, an island off Europe
- Britain (place name)
