= Marlon Starling vs. Tomás Molinares =

Boxing match

Double Trouble: Starling vs. Molinares
- Date: July 29, 1988
- Venue: Convention Hall, Atlantic City, New Jersey, U.S.
- Title(s) on the line: WBA welterweight title

Tale of the tape
Boxer	Marlon Starling	Tomás Molinares
Nickname	The Magic Man	Moli
Hometown	Hartford, Connecticut, U.S.	Cartagena, Bolívar, Colombia
Pre-fight record	43–4–1 (26 KO)	23–0 (20 KO)
Age	28 years, 11 months	23 years, 3 months
Height	5 ft 8 in (173 cm)	5 ft 9 in (175 cm)
Weight	147 lb (67 kg)	147 lb (67 kg)
Style	Orthodox	Orthodox
Recognition	WBA; Welterweight Champion; The Ring; No. 1 Ranked Welterweight	WBA; No. 1 Ranked Welterweight

Result
- No contest Originally 5th-round KO for Molinares, changed to a no contest after it was deemed that the punch Molinares had knocked out Starling with was thrown after the bell

Marlon Starling vs. Tomás Molinares was a professional boxing match contested on July 29, 1988, for the WBA welterweight title. The fight was part of a doubleheader event billed as Double Trouble.

== Background ==
In what was billed as a precursor to a unification match between the two, Marlon Starling, the WBA's welterweight champion, and Lloyd Honeyghan, who held the WBC's version of the title, would participate in a doubleheader event broadcast on HBO World Championship Boxing in which they would each make title defenses against their respective mandatory challengers. Starling would defend his title against the WBA's number-one ranked contender, Tomás Molinares, while Honeyghan would face Yung-Kil Jung, the WBC's number-one ranked welterweight contender. Should they each win, Starling and Honeyghan were then planned to face each other with a tentative date scheduled for late in the year in November.

== The fights ==
=== Undercard ===
The undercard saw wins for Rod Douglas and Rafael Pineda.

=== Honeyghan vs. Jung ===
Double Trouble: Honeyghan vs. Jung
- Title(s) on the line: WBC and The Ring welterweight titles

Tale of the tape
Boxer	Lloyd Honeyghan	Yung-Kil Chung
Nickname	Raggamuffin Man	
Hometown	Bermondsey, Greater London, U.K.	Gooheung City, Jeollanam-do, South Korea
Pre-fight record	32–1 (21 KO)	25–3–2 (17 KO)
Age	28 years, 3 months	24 years, 10 months
Height	5 ft 9 in (175 cm)	5 ft 11 in (180 cm)
Weight	147 lb (67 kg)	146 3/4 lb (67 kg)
Style	Orthodox	Orthodox
Recognition	WBC and The Ring; Welterweight Champion	WBC; No. 1 Ranked Welterweight

Result
- Honeyghan defeats Chung by 5th round TKO

The co featured bout saw Lloyd Honeyghan make the first defence in his second reign as WBC, lineal and The Ring champion, after knocking out Jorge Vaca in their rematch, having controversially lost by a split technical decision the first time.

Chug the former OPBF and South Korean welterweight champion was fighting for the first time outside his homeland. Honeyghan said of him "He's a very good boxer. He throws good left hooks to the body. And he has a very good, busy jab. He stopped guys in fights I saw. He's good but he's not fast. He doesn't have much variety of punches."

He also expressed a desire to reunify the belts saying "I'm back where I belong, champion of the world. My main objective is to be undisputed welterweight champion again. I want people to say, 'there goes Lloyd Honeyghan, undisputed welterweight champion,' not, 'there goes Lloyd Honeyghan, WBC champion.'"

==== The fight ====
Honeyghan would largely control the bout. In the 5th round a short left hook, less than a minute into the round, saw the challenger dropped but referee Tony Orlando immediately ruled it an accidental low blow so no count began. Under WBC rules Chug had 5 minutes to continue, however after only 3 his corner informed the referee that he could not continue giving Honeyghan a TKO victory.

According to HBO's punchstats Honeyghan landed 163 punches out of 319 thrown compared to Chug's 71 punches landed out of 262 thrown.

At the time of the stoppage, Honeyghan led on all three scorecards 40–36 twice and 39–37.

==== Aftermath ====
Furious Korean supporters rushed to ringside to boo the decision and shout "you dirty fighter" at the departing champion.

Honeyghan would accuse Chug of attempting to get him disqualified, saying "I hit him below the belt only because he pulled my head down and I couldn't get my body up to punch properly, I just couldn't believe he stayed down as long as he did, though."

Chung's manager called for a rematch saying "This is ridiculous, a champ shouldn't win like this. I feel we have to have a rematch."

Preceded by vs. Jorge Vaca II	Lloyd Honeyghan's bouts 29 July 1988	Succeeded by vs. Marlon Starling
Preceded by vs. Rolando Aldemir	Yung-Kil Jung's bouts 29 July 1988	Succeeded by vs. Francisco Ferrer

=== Main Event ===
Starling got off to a slow start, losing the first two rounds to Molinares on all three official scorecards. Starling, however, took control in the third round and would win that round and the subsequent two rounds after. However, the fight would come to a sudden end at the end of the sixth round. Starling and Molinares were engaged in close quarters at the end of the round when just as the bell rang to signify the end of the round, Molinares hit a big roundhouse right that dropped Starling to the canvas. Starling made no attempt to get back up as referee Joe Cortez counted to 10. As it was unknown at the time if the punch was landed before or after the bell, there was a three minute delay before Molinares was finally declared the winner by knockout.

== Aftermath ==
I wasn't knocked out! I wasn't knocked down!

— Starling during his post-fight interview with Larry Merchant

In the immediate aftermath, HBO commentator Larry Merchant interviewed Cortez, who explained that he felt that Molinares was in the process of throwing the punch as the bell rang, thus deeming it legal. Cortez was backed up by New Jersey State Athletic Control Board head Larry Hazzard who at the time agreed with Cortez's assessment, though he admitted later that the punch may have in fact landed "a fraction of a second after the bell". Merchant also memorably interviewed a confused Starling, oblivious to the fact that he had been knocked out and now sporting a sprained ankle, who claimed he had neither been knocked down or out and, despite being unable to stand, felt he could "go another round."

Two weeks after the fight, Hazzard did an about face and nullified Molinares' victory, instead declaring the bout a no contest. Hazzard stated that he made the decision because a "single bizarre incident like this should not be the determining factor of a fight" though he maintained that Cortez was not at fault and had "made a ruling based upon his observation and judgment." Though Molinares' victory was voided, it was up to the WBA to either return the belt to Starling or continue to recognize Molinares as their welterweight champion. The day after Hazzard's decision to void the contest, the WBA announced that it would in fact continue to recognized Molinares as champion.

In spite of Starling having lost his title, he and Honeyghan nevertheless proceeded with their anticipated fight, which was officially announced in early January 1989 to take place the following month on February 4th. Just weeks before the Starling–Honeyghan was made official, it was announced that Molinares would make the first defense of his WBA welterweight title against former WBA welterweight champion Mark Breland on the undercard. However, only days after the doubleheader event was announced, Molinares pulled out of his fight with Breland and vacated the title with his manager citing "severe mental depression" as the reason for him doing so. This gave Molinares the rare distinction of being a world champion despite never officially winning a title fight and never making a title defense.

== Fight card ==
Confirmed bouts:

Weight Class	Weight		vs.		Method	Round	Notes
Welterweight	147 lbs.	Marlon Starling (c)	vs.	Tomás Molinares	NC	6/12	^{Note 1}
Welterweight	147 lbs.	Lloyd Honeyghan (c)	def.	Yung-Kil Jung	TKO	5/12	^{Note 2}
Super Lightweight	140 lbs.	Rafael Pineda	def.	Juan Minaya	KO	5/8
Middleweight	160 lbs.	Rod Douglas	def.	Lester Yarbrough	UD	8/8
Middleweight	160 lbs.	Willie Monroe	def.	Richard Holloway	TKO	2/6

^Note 1 For WBA Welterweight title
^Note 2 For WBC Welterweight title

== Broadcasting ==
Country	Broadcaster
United Kingdom	BBC
United States	HBO

Preceded by vs. Mark Breland II	Marlon Starling's bouts 29 July 1988	Succeeded by vs. Lloyd Honeyghan
Preceded by vs. Eric Perea	Tomás Molinares's bouts 29 July 1988	Succeeded by vs. Horacio Pérez
