= Michael Nunn vs. Marlon Starling =

Boxing match

- Date: April 14, 1990
- Venue: The Mirage, Paradise, Nevada, U.S.
- Title(s) on the line: IBF middleweight title

Tale of the tape
Boxer	Michael Nunn	Marlon Starling
Nickname	Second to (Nunn)	The Magic Man
Hometown	Davenport, Iowa, U.S.	Hartford, Connecticut, U.S.
Purse	$1,100,000	$850,000
Pre-fight record	34–0 (23 KO)	45–4–1 (1) (27 KO)
Age	27 years	30 years, 7 months
Height	6 ft 2 in (188 cm)	5 ft 8 in (173 cm)
Weight	160 lb (73 kg)	158 lb (72 kg)
Style	Southpaw	Orthodox
Recognition	IBF; Middleweight Champion; The Ring; No. 1 Ranked Middleweight; The Ring No. 3 ranked pound-for-pound fighter	WBC; Welterweight Champion; The Ring; No. 1 Ranked Welterweight

Result
- Nunn wins via majority decision (118–110, 117–111, 114–114)

Michael Nunn vs. Marlon Starling was a professional boxing match contested on April 14, 1990, for the IBF middleweight title.

== Background ==
In October 1989, the undefeated and reigning IBF middleweight champion Michael Nunn reached a multiyear agreement with the then-brand new Las Vegas area hotel and casino The Mirage that would see Nunn defend his title against a yet-to-be named opponent. Marlon Starling, then the reigning WBC welterweight champion was in negotiations with Nunn at the time and was the heavy favorite, though Nunn's promoter also named Lindell Holmes and John Mugabi as possible opponents. Just over a week after Nunn had announced his deal with The Mirage, it was confirmed that Starling would in fact be Nunn's opponent, with Starling agreeing to an $850,000 payday after previously having asked for no less than $1,000,000. Starling, having fought as a welterweight for his entire career up to that point, had expressed interest in moving up to middleweight in search of more lucrative fights after his most recent welterweight title defense against Young Kil Jung had only netted him $100,000. Starling was simultaneously in negotiations for a unification bout with IBF welterweight champion Simon Brown but passed on the fight after failing to get the $1,000,000 payday he desired and chose to fight Nunn after receiving a higher offer.

Originally scheduled to take place on January 27, 1990, the fight was postponed after Nunn injured his back in December when he fell on steps as this home. As it was not known how long it would take for Nunn's injury to heal, a new date was not announced at the time of the postponement until over a month later when the fight was rescheduled for April 14.

Starling, having made a 2-weight class jump and giving up six inches to Nunn, was a 6–1 underdog going into the fight. Starling downplayed the notion that he was an underdog, calling himself the "best fighter in the world" at the pre-fight press conference though Nunn quickly retorted that Starling was in fact the "best welterweight in the world." Starling also mentioned that he was "comfortable" at the 160-pound middleweight limit as he claimed his natural weight when not boxing was 165 pounds, telling the media "I'm going to come into the fight comfortable and strong. I'm as fast and as quick as Michael."

== The fight ==
The fight was largely a tactical affair with neither fighter taking many chances, though Nunn was the more active of the two, throwing 972 punches and landing 309 as opposed to Starling who landed 265 of his 682 thrown punches. With the fight going the 12-round distance, two judges had Nunn comfortably ahead with scores of 118–110 and 117–111, giving Starling only two and three rounds respectively, while the third scored the fight a draw with a 114–114 score, giving both fighters six rounds apiece, making it a majority decision win for Nunn.

== Fight card ==
Confirmed bouts:

Weight Class	Weight		vs.		Method	Round	Notes
Middleweight	160 lbs.	Michael Nunn (c)	def	Marlon Starling	MD	12/12	^{Note 1}
Super Featherweight	130 lbs.	Jeff Franklin	def	Gabriel Ruelas	TKO	7/10
Super Middleweight	168 lbs.	Antoine Byrd	def.	Tim Williams	UD	10/10
Super Featherweight	130 lbs.	Rafael Ruelas	def.	Arturo Hernandez	TKO	1/8
Heavyweight	200+ lbs.	Riddick Bowe	def	Eddie Gonzales	UD	8/8
Heavyweight	200+ lbs.	Jimmy Ellis	def.	Don Askew	KO	1/4

^Note 1 For IBF middleweight title

== Broadcasting ==
Country	Broadcaster
Mexico	Imevisión
United Kingdom	British Eurosport
United States	HBO

Preceded by vs. Iran Barkley	Michael Nunn's bouts 14 April 1990	Succeeded by vs. Donald Curry
Preceded by vs. Young Kil Jung	Marlon Starling's bouts 14 April 1990	Succeeded by vs. Maurice Blocker
