= Breeland =

Breeland is a surname. Notable people with the surname include:

- Bashaud Breeland (born 1992), American football player
- Floyd Breeland (1933–2020), American politician
- Jake Breeland (born 1997), American football player

== See also ==
- Breland (disambiguation)
