= Johnny Duke =

American boxer and coach

Giulio Gallucci (1924–2006), also known as Johnny Duke, was an American, Hartford, Connecticut-born boxer and coach. Duke fought professionally from 1942 to 1946 and was inducted into the Connecticut Boxing Hall of Fame's inaugural class. He also is a member of the National Golden Gloves Hall of Fame. His is beloved and remembered for his work with inner city youth.

The youngest of three brothers, Duke grew up in the North End of Hartford to a poor immigrant Italian family. His father, Lucie Gallucci, deserted the family when he was a child. Perpetually on welfare, Duke and his brothers, Joseph and John, struggled for stability. Duke was introduced to boxing by legendary champion Willie Pep when they were both shoeshine boys in downtown Hartford. Duke joined a gym and became a sparring partner for Pep. Duke also trained at Stillman's Gym in New York alongside boxers such as Sugar Ray Robinson and Henry Armstrong. He was 23-21-4 under his birth name, and also fought a handful of fights at the end of his career as Johnny Duke. He picked the name "Duke" for his well tailored suits and sharp dress.

== Career ==
As a corner man, Duke helped develop top amateurs such as Jimmy Blythe, Donnie Nelson, Herb Darity, Marlon Starling and former U.S. Olympian Lawrence Clay-Bey. He coached Starling to a national Junior Olympics championship. Later, Starling won the World Boxing Association (WBA) welterweight title. Duke's influence is still felt. Mike Oliver, one of the fighters at Duke's service, is unbeaten as a super bantamweight and won the USBO title on February 18, 2006.

Duke was a manager at the Bellevue Square Boys Club during the 1960s and 1970s. His connection to the multicultural North End of Hartford earned him a job with the city acting as a go-between for the cops. Bellevue Square boxers dominated the Western Massachusetts Golden Gloves tournaments for several years. That tournament is now called the Western New England Golden Gloves and was held for the first time in Connecticut at The Colony in Vernon early 2006. The Bellevue Square housing complex underwent a $14 million reconstruction, and the gym building was demolished in 1997.

Jim Jedrziewski was so captivated by Duke's stories that he decided to write a biography of the Hartford boxing coach and trainer. The book, No Pretender Johnny Duke: an American Original, was published in 2003.

Duke was buried at the Cedar Hill Cemetery in Hartford. He is survived by his daughters Helen, Nancy, and Diana.
