= Breland =

Breland may refer to:

== Places ==
- Breland, Norway, a village in Agder county, Norway
- Breland Station, a railway station located within Breland, Norway

== People ==
- Breland (singer) (born 1995), an American singer, songwriter and record producer
- Jessica Breland (born 1988), an American basketball player for the Chicago Sky WNBA team
- Jim Breland (born 1944), a former American football player who was an All-American center for Georgia Tech
- Marian Breland Bailey (1920–2001), an American psychologist and applied behavior analyst
- Mark Breland (born 1963), a former world champion boxer from New York
- Pascal Breland, a famous 19th-century pre-confederation Canadian Métis farmer and politician
- Patrice Breland (1837–1908), a fur trader and political figure in Manitoba, Canada

== Other ==
- Breland, a fictional place in Khorvaire in the Dungeons and Dragons universe
