= Jim Ellis (American football) =

American football player (NFL) and boxer

No. 58
- Position: Linebacker

Personal information
- Born: March 25, 1964 (age 62); Pomona, California, U.S.
- Listed height: 6 ft 3 in (1.91 m)
- Listed weight: 240 lb (109 kg)

Career information
- High school: Redondo Union (Redondo Beach, California)
- College: Boise State
- NFL draft: 1987: 10th round, 273rd overall pick

Career history
- Los Angeles Raiders (1987)
- Stats at Pro Football Reference

Jim Kevin Ellis (born March 25, 1964) is an American former professional football player in the National Football League (NFL) with the Los Angeles Raiders. He is also a former professional boxer who fought in the Heavyweight division.

== American football ==
He moved to Boise, Idaho after graduation from Redondo Union High School. In Boise, he played college football for the Boise State Broncos football team at Boise State University. Weighing 237 pounds and listed at 6 feet, 2 inches tall, Ellis played from 1983 to 1986, returning five interceptions for a total of 63 yards.

He was drafted by the Los Angeles Raiders in 1987 and played three games during a season that was affected by a strike. He did not achieve any stats in those three games. He was one of the replacement players.

== Professional boxing ==
Ellis decided to try a professional boxing career, and, on Tuesday, February 21, 1989, at the Central Plaza Hotel in Oklahoma City, Oklahoma, he debuted against Howard Nero, who had lost all three of his previous bouts. Ellis won that fight by a first-round knockout.

Ellis had a promising start into professional boxing, building a record of 16 wins, 0 losses and 1 draw (tie) in his first 17 tests, with 15 wins by knockout, a record which demonstrated he was a boxer with considerable skills and hard punching power. However, for fight number 18, he would face the legendary, comebacking former and future world heavyweight champion, George Foreman, whose record was of 68 wins and 3 losses, with 64 wins by knockout. There were many skeptics as far as Ellis' ability to beat Foreman before the bout; nevertheless, Foreman commented about his rival with respect prior to their facing off, in this contest of hard hitting heavyweight boxers. Their fight took place on Saturday, December 7, 1991, at the Reno-Sparks Convention Center in Reno, Nevada, as part of an HBO Boxing televised event headlined by an IBF vacant world junior welterweight championship fight between American former two-time world champion Roger Mayweather and Colombian rival Rafael Pineda (won by Pineda by ninth-round knockout). Foreman was just coming off an unsuccessful but inspired effort in losing to Evander Holyfield for the world heavyweight title in his previous contest. Foreman-Ellis was officiated by referee Richard Steele and promoted by Bob Arum. Foreman won the contest by a third-round technical knockout.

Ellis' boxing career zigzagged from that point on; he only won four of his last eight contests. However, two notable wins took place, one over former WBA world cruiserweight title challenger, Eddie Taylor, 31 wins, 15 losses and 1 draw before their fight, a 5th-round knockout win on Friday, October 16, 1992, in Boise. Taylor had faced the likes of Ossie Ocasio (in his world title challenge), Marvin Camel, Rickey Parkey, Dwight Muhammad Qawi and Lee Roy Murphy in his career; he was on a seven-fight losing streak when he faced Ellis.

The other one was against former WBA world heavyweight champion Tony Tubbs. Tubbs had 34 wins and 4 losses when this contest took place at the Boise Center on Monday, August 16, 1993. Ellis won the fight by a 22-seconds, first-round knockout for arguably the biggest win of his career.

In his last professional boxing contest, Ellis faced future WBO and linear world heavyweight champion Shannon Briggs, who was undefeated in 16 bouts coming into their Saturday, March 12, 1994, match at the MGM Grand in Las Vegas, Nevada. Briggs won the six-rounds contest by a first-round knockout, causing Ellis to decide to retire.

== Boxing record ==
Ellis had a record of 20 wins, 5 losses and 1 draw (tie) in 26 professional boxing contests, with 19 of those wins and 4 of those losses coming by knockout or technical knockout.

== Personal life ==
In 1995, Ellis began working in the insurance industry. He joined Bankers Life in 2022. His page at that company's website states that he enjoys fishing at the Boise River. He has been married to his wife, Carrie Ellis, for more than 30 years, and has 4 daughters with her as well as 12 grandchildren.
