= Michael Nunn vs. Iran Barkley =

Boxing match

Thunder in the Night
- Date: August 14, 1989
- Venue: Lawlor Events Center, Reno, Nevada, U.S.
- Title(s) on the line: IBF and The Ring middleweight titles

Tale of the tape
Boxer	Michael Nunn	Iran Barkley
Nickname	Second to (Nunn)	The Blade
Hometown	Davenport, Iowa, U.S.	The Bronx, New York, U.S.
Purse	$1,250,000	$400,000
Pre-fight record	33–0 (23 KO)	25–5 (16 KO)
Age	26 years, 4 months	29 years, 3 months
Height	6 ft 1 in (185 cm)	6 ft 1 in (185 cm)
Weight	159 lb (72 kg)	160 lb (73 kg)
Style	Southpaw	Orthodox
Recognition	IBF and The Ring; Middleweight Champion	IBF; No. 1 Ranked Middleweight; Former WBC middleweight champion

Result
- Nunn wins majority decision (116–113, 115–113, 114–114)

Michael Nunn vs. Iran Barkley, billed as Thunder in the Night, was a professional boxing match contested on August 14, 1989, for the IBF middleweight title.

== Background ==
In his previous fight on February 24, 1989, Iran Barkley made the first defense of the WBC middleweight against Roberto Durán, being upset by the aging Durán in a split decision loss. With Durán moving on to face Sugar Ray Leonard for a third time later in the year, Barkley would instead agree the challenge the undefeated IBF middleweight champion Michael Nunn.

Going into the fight, Nunn sported an impressive 33–0 record and was regarded as the top middleweight and one of the top pound-for-found fighters in boxing. Prior to agreeing to face Barkley, Nunn had planned to face Sugar Ray Leonard, but Leonard declined a fight with Nunn in order to pursue a more lucrative fight with Durán.

Barkley was instilled as a heavy underdog with oddsmakers favoring Nunn at 10–1. The confident Nunn derided his opponent, stating that Barkley had the "IQ of an onion" and insultingly nicknaming him "Bark-Bark." Barkley responded that "as a champion, he should know how to carry himself." Though Nunn retorted that he could "back up" his insults.

== The fight ==
Using his boxing skills and superior quickness, Nunn kept his distance from the hard-hitting Barkley for most of the fight, but did just enough to earn a close majority decision victory. Barkley was the aggressor for the entire match, constantly marching forward, though he had trouble landing any sustained offense as Nunn often alluded his punches, hit Barkley with his own and then hastily retreated. One judge scored the fight even at 114–114, giving both fighters six round apiece, however he was overruled by the other two judges who awarded the fight to Nunn with scores of 116–113 (seven rounds to four, one round tied) and 115–113 (seven rounds to five).

== Aftermath ==
Despite his victory, Nunn was criticized for his perceived lackluster performance. Nunn's promoter Bob Arum particularly bashed Nunn for his defense-first style, which he felt made for unentertaining fights. After the fight Arum, whom had secured Nunn a $1.25 million payday for the fight, complained to the media that "Nunn is two rounds of fighting and the rest a dance." Arum would then announce that he would sever all ties with Nunn, releasing him from his promotional contract which had one fight remaining, stating "We have one more fight and we are going to release him from it." Upon being informed of Arum's comments, Nunn responded "I feel I entertained. Iran Barkley is awkward and strong." Nunn's manager Dan Goossen later clarified that Nunn's performance against Barkley had nothing to do with Arum and Nunn parting ways as they had agreed to do so two weeks before the fight happened.

For his next bout, Nunn had reached tentative plans to defend his title against Thomas Hearns. However, this fight never came to be as Hearns opted not to moved back down to middleweight and decided to instead move up to the light heavyweight division. Nunn instead made his next defense against Marlon Starling the following April.

== Fight card ==
Confirmed bouts:

Weight Class	Weight		vs.		Method	Round	Notes
Middleweight	160 lbs.	Michael Nunn (c)	def.	Iran Barkley	MD	12/12	^{Note 1}
Super Featherweight	130 lbs.	Lupe Gutierrez	def.	Rosendo Alonso	TKO	2/10
Light Flyweight	108 lbs.	Michael Carbajal	def.	Prudencio De Jesus	KO	2/6
Super Welterweight	154 lbs.	Robert Wangila	def.	Keith Banks	TKO	4/6
Bantamweight	118 lbs.	Jess Medina	def.	Oscar Jimenez	UD	4/4

^Note 1 For IBF middleweight title

== Broadcasting ==
Country	Broadcaster
United States	HBO

Preceded by vs. Sumbu Kalambay	Michael Nunn's bouts 19 August 1989	Succeeded by vs. Marlon Starling
Preceded by vs. Roberto Durán	Iran Barkley's bouts 19 August 1989	Succeeded by vs. Nigel Benn
