= Larry Hazzard =

American boxing referee, judge, official, commentator and actor

- Born: December 7, 1944 (age 81)
- Occupations: former amateur boxer, former boxing referee, former boxing judge, athletic commissioner and actor

Larry Hazzard Sr. (born 7 December 1944) is a former amateur boxer, boxing referee, athletic control board commissioner, teacher and actor. He is a member of the International Boxing Hall of Fame, being inducted during 2010. Hazzard has served as Commissioner of the New Jersey State Athletic Control Board since 2014, his second stint as commissioner after serving from 1985 to 2007.

== Early life ==
Hazzard was born in Newark, New Jersey. Hazzard wanted to become a boxer as a youth, having idolized as a kid, among others, Sugar Ray Robinson and Joe Louis. He attended Central High School, winning Golden Gloves titles each year from 1961 to 1963.

In 1963, at the age of 18, Hazzard fought Harry Conover in Elizabeth, New Jersey, winning on points over three rounds. Although listed as a three-time Golden Gloves champion and as a New Jersey A.A.U. champion by such websites as the New Jersey's government's web-page, Boxrec.com nevertheless listed only the Conover contest as having taken place in Hazzard's career.

Hazzard was also interested in Ju-Jitsu; he earned a black belt in that sport during 1968. Education-wise, Hazzard earned an Associate of Arts degree from Essex County College in 1970, and a Bachelor of Arts degree-cum laude- from Montclair State University in 1972. That year, Hazzard became a teacher, working at Newark Arts High School as a physical education and health instructor and as girls head track coach.

== Career as referee ==
Hazzard's first professional bout as a referee took place on 13 June 1978 and was between Mike Quarry and Kevin Smith, at Ice World, in Totowa, New Jersey. Hazzard was also a judge at this contest, which was scored a draw (tie) after ten rounds. Hazzard voted for Smith by one point.

Next, Hazzard participated in a contest between Mustafa Hamsho and Bobby Watts on 21 September 1978 at the Jersey City Armory in Jersey City, New Jersey. Hamsho won by sixth-round technical knockout.

The third bout refereed by Hazzard took place at the Rahway State Prison in Woodbridge Township, New Jersey, during an era in which boxing fights were allowed at United States prisons. That contest, between Reggie Jones and Ray Kates, took place on 10 March 1979. Kates won by a split decision after twelve rounds.

Three days later, on 13 March 1979, Hazzard refereed his first championship bout, when future Larry Holmes WBC world heavyweight championship challenger Scott Frank boxed Guy Casale for the New Jersey state heavyweight title at Ice World in Totowa, with Frank winning by ninth-round technical knockout.

On 1 June 1980, Hazzard refereed his first world championship bout, when he shared a boxing ring with fellow member of the International Boxing Hall of Fame, the WBA Junior Flyweight champion, Yoko Gushiken of Japan and with challenger Martin Vargas of Chile. This was also Hazzard's first contest abroad as a referee, as it was held in Kochi, Japan. Gushiken won the fight by an eighth-round knockout.

The next world title fight Hazzard refereed is sometimes considered a boxing classic: it was the bout between WBA world Lightweight champion Hilmer Kenty and his challenger Sean O'Grady, at the Bally's Park Place Hotel and Casino in Atlantic City on Sunday, 12 April 1981. In a bruising affair, champion and challenger traded blows for 15 rounds but the challenger dropped the champion in rounds two and eight en route to a fifteen-rounds unanimous decision win to capture the WBA world title.

On 5 September 1981, Hazzard returned to the Rahway Prison for a minor but still significant contest: that day, a bout took place between former inmate and future two-division world champion and fellow International Boxing Hall of Fame member, Dwight Muhammad Qawi (then known by his birth-name of "Dwight Braxton") and the then-still incarcerated, James Scott. Qawi, as Braxton, won the ten-rounds bout by a very close unanimous decision.

The first fight involving an undisputed, or, unified, world champion in a championship defense which Hazzard refereed was the match between Marvelous Marvin Hagler, unified world middleweight champion, and challenger William "Caveman" Lee. This contest took place on Sunday, 7 March 1982 at the Bally's Park Place Hotel in Atlantic City, Hagler retaining the title by an easy, first-round knockout. On 7 July 1982, Hazzard refereed a fight between 3-division world champion, fellow future International Boxing Hall of Famer, Nicaragua's Alexis Arguello and American Kevin Rooney, also held at the Bally's Park Place Hotel and which was won by Arguello by a second-round, highlight-reel knockout.

On 16 September 1982, Hazzard refereed a fight for the ESPN Welterweight championship between Robert Sawyer and Dick Eklund at the Sands Casino and Hotel in Atlantic City. At the time, ESPN, a major American sports television network, sponsored championships on bouts that were televised by that channel. Sawyer won the contest by a twelve-rounds unanimous decision.

=== Spinks vs. Qawi match ===
Hazzard continued refereeing fights, including bouts involving Michael Spinks, Gene Hatcher, Leon Spinks, Azumah Nelson, Bobby Czyz, Jeff Lampkin, a fight between future world heavyweight champions Gerrie Coetzee and Pinklon Thomas (a ten-rounds draw or tie, on 22 January 1983 at the Sands Hotel and Casino) and a fight between perennial heavyweight contenders Mitch Green and Jumbo Cummings (on 16 February 1983 at the Meadowlands Arena in East Rutherford) won by Green by ten-rounds unanimous decision, before receiving what was arguably the largest assignment of his career as a boxing referee: On March 18, 1983, Hazzard refereed the Michael Spinks vs. Dwight Muhammad Qawi world light-heavyweight championship unification bout, held at the Convention Center in Atlantic City, in an HBO Boxing televised contest between two fellow future International Boxing Hall of Fame members. In round eight, Hazzard ruled Spinks as having suffered a knockdown after Qawi landed a punch to Spinks' body; the call was somewhat controversial because many felt that Qawi had stepped on Spinks' toes before the punch landed. Faced without much of a choice, Hazzard called the fall a knockdown, but, reportedly, later admitted to thinking he got that call wrong. In the end, Spinks won a somewhat close but unanimous 15-rounds decision to retain his WBA world light-heavyweight title and unify it with the WBC one previously held by Qawi.

=== Rest of career as a referee ===
Exactly one month and six days after the Spinks versus Qawi match, Hazzard again refereed a bout featuring Alexis Arguello; this time, the Nicaraguan faced Trinitarian boxer and former WBA world lightweight champion Claude Noel on 24 April 1983 at the Showboat Hotel and Casino in Atlantic City. The fight was significant because of its ending: after being dropped in round one, Noel retired during round three, claiming a hip injury. The fight was telecast live on NBC Sportsworld and Noel looked to be in significant pain before retiring.

Two other rather significant ten-rounds, non-title contests with Hazzard as referee soon followed: on Sunday, 10 July 1983 at Atlantic City's Caesars Hotel and Casino, future International Boxing Hall of Fame member Thomas Hearns, the WBC world super-welterweight (junior-middleweight) champion, boxed future IBF world super-middleweight champion Murray Sutherland, who would later become the first-ever world champion as a super-middleweight. Hearns won that fight by ten-rounds unanimous decision. Thirteen days later, Hazzard refereed the ten-rounds fight between yet another future International Boxing Hall of Fame member, WBA world bantamweight champion Jeff Chandler and Oscar Muniz of Los Angeles, California. Chandler was undefeated in 33 previous tests and Muniz had lost 3 of his 41 bouts, with 3 draws (ties) and 35 victories. During this era, Chandler was widely considered to be among the ten best boxers, regardless of weight division, world-wide. Not many experts or fans gave Muniz much of a chance, but he won the fight, beating Chandler by a ten-rounds split decision and causing one of 1983's biggest upsets in professional boxing. That fight took place at the Atlantic City's Sands Hotel and Casino (Chandler later in the year avenged that loss, technically knocking out Muniz in seven rounds on 17 December to retain his WBA world bantamweight championship, also at the Sands Hotel and Casino in Atlantic City; that rematch was refereed by Vincent Rainone instead).

In October 1983, Hazzard found himself traveling, once again, to Japan; this time, to Sapporo; there, he refereed the fourth fight between WBA world junior-flyweight champion Lupe Madera of Mexico and challenger and former world champion Katsuo Tokashiki of Japan, in a bout held on 23 October. Madera retained his belt by a fifteen-rounds unanimous decision. Three months later, Hazzard went to Italy to referee the rematch between WBA world flyweight champion Santos Laciar of Argentina and former world champion Juan Herrera of Mexico, who was trying to recover the championship. This contest was held on 28 January 1984 at Marsala, where Laciar beat the Mexican for the second time, by scoring a 15-rounds unanimous decision victory.

Another fight of major significance in the sport of professional boxing's history which Hazzard refereed took place on 28 March 1984 at the Harrah's Marina Hotel and Casino in Atlantic City, between American Ernie Singletary and Scottish Murray Sutherland for the vacant IBF's world super-middleweight championship. This event was important because it was the first ever bout sanctioned by a major boxing organization for a world's super-middleweight championship. Sutherland won by a 15-rounds unanimous decision, thus becoming the first world super-middleweight champion recognized by a major organization (Billy Douglas, father of 1990 world heavyweight champion Buster Douglas, had once been crowned "world" super-middleweight champion during 1974 after a fight which was recognized only by the state of Ohio as being for a world title), as well as the lineal champion and the IBF champion.

On Sunday, 15 April 1984, Hazzard refereed the second IBF world lightweight championship contest, between American champion Charlie Brown and his Puerto Rican-American challenger, Harry Arroyo of Youngstown, Ohio. Arroyo won this contest by a 14-round knockout, crowning himself as IBF world lightweight champion.

One month and 4 days after Brown-Arroyo, Hazzard was in a Venezuelan ring overseeing the WBA world junior-flyweight championship bout between Lupe Madera and Francisco Quiroz of the Dominican Republic, on 19 May at Maracaibo. This meeting was a war; the Dominican challenger was floored in round four but he recuperated and won the world-title by a ninth-round knockout.

On June 1, 1985, Hazzard officiated over a fight that took place at the Parc des Princes stadium in Paris, France, between IBF world junior-middleweight champion Carlos Santos of Puerto Rico and local challenger Louis Acaries. Santos retained his title by a somewhat close but convincing fifteen-rounds unanimous decision.

On 19 October 1985, Hazzard was involved in what perhaps included one of the most spectacular endings to a world title fight in professional boxing's history: that day, at Stade Louis II in Fontvieille, Monaco, IBF world cruiserweight champion, American Lee Roy Murphy, was defending the title against Zambian challenger Chisanda Mutti. The contest was a thrilling affair, with many violent exchanges (and one knockdown for each fighter) throughout. In round twelve, a rare double knockdown occurred, the second knockdown in the bout for each boxer, when both champion and challenger landed knockout punches at the same time. Badly hurt, champion Murphy struggled to his feet before Mutti did. Mutti was counted out by Hazzard and Murphy retained his title by a twelfth-round knockout.

From 1985 to 1993, Hazzard became inactive as a referee in order to concentrate on his job as New Jersey athletic commissioner. The last contest he refereed during that period was the four-rounds encounter between Larry Hawkins and Joe DeLuise that took place on November 22 of 1985 at the Sands Hotel and Casino in Atlantic City, which was won by Hawkins by a unanimous decision.

He briefly returned to refereeing in 1993, when he oversaw the first contest between WBC world Welterweight champion Buddy McGirt and challenger, the already multiple-division world champion Pernell Whitaker on Saturday, 6 March 1993 at the Madison Square Garden in New York City. The first bout between those two future International Boxing Hall of Fame members resulted in a Whitaker win by a very close, somewhat controversial unanimous decision, in another HBO Boxing telecast.

The last fight that Hazzard refereed was also televised by HBO Boxing; it was the bout between WBA world heavyweight champion, future International Boxing Hall of Fame member Riddick Bowe and his challenger, Jesse Ferguson. This contest took place on 22 May 1993 at the RFK Stadium in Washington, D.C. Bowe won the test by a second-round knockout.

== Boxing judge ==
From 1978 to 2012, Hazzard was involved in 33 professional boxing matches as a scoring judge.

The first world-title fight he scored as a judge involved Puerto Rico's future International Boxing Hall of Fame member, Wilfredo Gomez, defending his WBC world super-bantamweight title against Mexico's Juan "Kid" Meza on 27 March 1982 at the Playboy Hotel and Casino in Atlantic City. Gomez won by sixth-round technical knockout.

Other important fights that Hazzard judged included the 20 May 1983, rematch between WBA world heavyweight champion Michael Dokes and challenger, former world champion Mike Weaver at the Dunes Hotel in Las Vegas, Nevada, which was scored a draw (tie) after fifteen rounds (Hazzard scored it a 144-144 tie), and Marvin Camel versus Roddy MacDonald on December 13, 1983 at the Halifax Metro Centre in Halifax, Canada, in what constituted the first ever IBF world cruiserweight championship contest, won by Camel by fifth-round technical knockout,

From 1985 to 1990, Hazzard stopped judging fights, in order to concentrate on his commissioner's duties. He returned as a judge on a contest that took place 14 January 1990 in Incheon, South Korea, between WBA world junior flyweight champion, future International Boxing Hall of Fame member Myung Woo Yuh and challenger Hisashi Tokushima, which was won by Yuh by a seventh-round knockout.

Hazzard continued judging fights until 8 December 2012, his last contest judged being one between Neuky Santelises and Mikah Branch, won by Santelises by a four-rounds unanimous decision at the Resorts World Casino in Queens, New York.

== New Jersey Athletic Control Board Commissioner ==
In 1985, Hazzard was appointed by New Jersey governor Thomas Kean as commissioner of the SACB, a position he held until 2007. He oversaw the commission at a time when there was a lot of boxing activity going on in New Jersey, including, for example, the Mike Tyson versus Michael Spinks contest in June, 1988, the Hector Camacho-Vinnie Pazienza fight of February, 1990 and others.

One of the most controversial bouts that took place in New Jersey during that era and in which Hazzard had to take a stand was the one between WBA world welterweight champion Marlon Starling and challenger Tomas Molinares of Colombia, which took place on 29 June 1988 at the Convention Hall in Atlantic City. That day, Starling and Molinares were involved in a rather close bout until right near the end of round six, when the two combatants threw consecutive, over-looping right hands during a trade. Starling's missed but Molinares connected, knocking Starling out. Referee Joe Cortez counted the champion out, but a controversy arose because Molinares' punch was thrown right at, or just tenths of a second after, the bell had sounded. Jim Lampley and Larry Merchant of HBO, which was transmitting the contest live, were of the opinion that the punch was thrown clearly after the bell. After reviewing the fight, on 11 August 1988, Hazzard announced the fight's result would be changed to a no-contest, while at the same time delegating the decision of whether to continue recognizing Molinares as a world champion or not to the WBA. Hazzard's decision was reported on the 12 August edition of The New York Times, the same day when, in Panama, the WBA announced they would continue recognizing Molinares as world champion until the time he either lost his title in the ring, was deposed as champion by the WBA or himself decided to leave the title vacant.

== IBF ==
From 2008 to 2010, Hazzard was the International Boxing Federation's Personal Assistant to the President and Chairman of Officials' Education, Development and Supervision.

== School principal ==
Hazzard served as principal at the Adelaide E. Sanford Charter School in Newark from May 2012 to June 2013.

== Commentator ==
Hazzard also worked as a boxing analyst for NBC Sports.

== Acting ==
Hazzard has also acted, participating in the 1988 Mickey Rourke film Homeboy as a referee, in 2001's Ali, as referee Zack Clayton, and in 2003's Undefeated, also as a referee.

== Personal ==
Hazzard has three children with wife Patricia. One of them, Larry Hazzard, Jr., was a producer of the Showtime Championship Boxing television show and was inducted into the New Jersey Boxing Hall of Fame during 2019.
