= Iran Barkley vs. Roberto Durán =

Boxing match

Steel vs. Stone
- Date: February 24, 1989
- Venue: Convention Hall, Atlantic City, New Jersey, U.S.
- Title(s) on the line: WBC middleweight title

Tale of the tape
Boxer	Iran Barkley	Roberto Durán
Nickname	The Blade	Manos de Piedra ("Hands of Stone")
Hometown	Brooklyn, New York, U.S.	Panama City, Panama Province, Panama
Purse	$500,000	$325,000
Pre-fight record	25–4 (16 KO)	84–7 (62 KO)
Age	28 years, 9 months	37 years, 8 months
Height	6 ft 1 in (185 cm)	5 ft 7 1/2 in (171 cm)
Weight	159 lb (72 kg)	156 1/4 lb (71 kg)
Style	Orthodox	Orthodox
Recognition	WBC; Middleweight Champion; The Ring; No. 2 Ranked Middleweight	WBC; No. 5 Ranked Middleweight; 3-division world champion

Result
- Durán wins via 12-round split decision (116–112, 118–112, 113–116)

Iran Barkley vs. Roberto Durán, billed as Steel vs. Stone, was a professional boxing match contested on February 24, 1989, for the WBC middleweight title.

The fight was The Ring magazine's fight of the year for 1989.

== Background ==
In his previous fight on June 6, 1988, Iran Barkley had upset the reigning WBC middleweight champion Thomas Hearns to claim Hearns' title. For his first defense, Barkley reached an agreement with Roberto Durán that was contingent on Durán first defeating unheralded journeyman Jeff Lanas in October that same year. Though Durán barely eked out a split decision win against Lanas, the Barkley-Durán fight was made official in December with it taking place February the following year.

The now-37-year old Durán, who had not had a title fight since being knocked out inside of two rounds by Thomas Hearns in 1984 and had fought mostly unknowns since returning to boxing in 1986, was thought to be washed up and came into the fight as underdog. Durán's last title win had come against Barkley's childhood friend Davey Moore in 1983. Moore had been killed in a freak accident only six months prior and Barkley had hoped to dedicate a victory to his fallen friend stating "This is personal because I remember Duran not so long ago against my friend Davey Moore. This is for Davey, this is really for Davey. I want (Duran) to know from the bottom of my heart, no one can take this title." Barkley also vowed that the fight would be Durán's "last hurrah." Durán was unbothered by Barkley's trash talk, retorting "Barkley is saying what he's going to do and not going to do. Come Feb. 24, he's the one who's got to worry. I'm going to demonstrate I'm not finished like a lot of people say. I'm going to prove it."

On the day of the fight, there was some minor controversy at the pre-fight weigh-in which took place to ensure both fighters were at the 160 pound middleweight limit. While Durán weighed in at 156 pounds, Barkley's initial reading came in at over 164 pounds, which if correct would have led to him being immediately stripped of the title and the fight called off. After protests from Barkley's camp, he was allowed to be re-weighed and came in at 159 pounds with the 5 pound discrepancy being explained as Barkley standing on the back edge of the scale.

== The fight ==
Durán would upset Barkley, earning a split decision victory and capturing his fourth (and final) world title in his fourth different weight class. Barkley started the fight decently, winning seven of the first eight rounds on one of the judge's scorecard and four of eight on another, but Durán would go toe-to-toe with his much larger opponent and landed numerous overhand rights during the later rounds en route to winning the final four rounds on all three scorecards. Durán would score the fights lone knockdown in the 11th round, landing three consecutive right hands that dropped Barkley to the canvas. Barkley would survive the round, but was clearly dazed from the exchange and after the bell rang momentarily wandered the ring in search of his corner. After the fighters fought a close 12th, the decision came down to the scorecards with Durán winning two of them with scores of 116–112 and 118–112 while Barkley won 116–113 on the third.

Barkley was complementary in his defeat stating about Durán "It was his heart. It just wouldn't go" while Durán quipped "I am like a bottle of wine. The older I get, the better."

== Undercard ==
The undercard (billed as Gold to Glory) featured the professional debuts of five Olympic medalists, who had all competed at the 1988 Summer Olympics the previous year. Four of the fighters had won the gold medal in their respective weight classes, these were Americans Ray Mercer (heavyweight), Kennedy McKinney (super bantamweight) and Andrew Maynard (light heavyweight) as well as Kenyan Robert Wangila (welterweight). The fifth, American Michael Carbajal had won the silver in the light flyweight division. All five fighters were victorious in their respective matches.

=== Fight card ===
Confirmed bouts:

Weight Class	Weight		vs.		Method	Round	Notes
Middleweight	160 lbs.	Roberto Durán	def.	Iran Barkley (c)	SD	12/12	^{Note 1}
Light Flyweight	108 lbs.	Michael Carbajal	def.	Will Grigsby	UD	4/4
Super Bantamweight	122 lbs.	Kennedy McKinney	def.	David Alers	TKO	2/4
Heavyweight	200+ lbs.	Ray Mercer	def.	Jesse McGhee	TKO	3/4
Welterweight	147 lbs.	Robert Wangila	def.	Sidney Ubeda Gomes	UD	4/4
Light Heavyweight	175 lbs.	Andrew Maynard	def.	Zack Worthy	TKO	1/4
Welterweight	147 lbs.	Larry Barnes	def	Glover Washington	PTS	4/4

^Note 1 For WBC Middleweight title

== Broadcasting ==
Country	Broadcaster
Mexico	Imevisión
Philippines	GMA Network
United Kingdom	ITV
United States	ESPN

Preceded by vs. Thomas Hearns	Iran Barkley's bouts 24 February 1989	Succeeded by vs. Michael Nunn
Preceded by vs. Jeff Lanas	Roberto Durán's bouts 24 February 1989	Succeeded by vs. Sugar Ray Leonard III
Awards
Preceded by Rocky Lockridge vs. Tony Lopez	The Ring Fight of the Year; 1989	Succeeded by Julio César Chávez vs. Meldrick Taylor
Preceded by Iran Barkley vs. Michael Olajide	KO Magazine Fight of the Year; 1989	Succeeded by Julio César Chávez vs. Meldrick Taylor
