= Mark Breland vs. Marlon Starling =

Boxing match

- Date: August 22, 1987
- Venue: Township Auditorium, Columbia, South Carolina, U.S.
- Title(s) on the line: WBA welterweight title

Tale of the tape
Boxer	Mark Breland	Marlon Starling
Nickname		The Magic Man
Hometown	Brooklyn, New York, U.S.	Hartford, Connecticut, U.S.
Purse		$70,000
Pre-fight record	18–0 (12 KO)	41–4 (25 KO)
Age	24 years, 3 months	27 years, 11 months
Height	6 ft 2 in (188 cm)	5 ft 8 in (173 cm)
Weight	146 lb (66 kg)	146 lb (66 kg)
Style	Orthodox	Orthodox
Recognition	WBA; Welterweight Champion; The Ring; No. 1 Ranked Welterweight	WBA; No. 1 Ranked Welterweight; The Ring; No. 2 Ranked Welterweight

Result
- Starling wins by 11th-round technical knockout

Mark Breland vs. Marlon Starling was a professional boxing match contested on August 22, 1987, for the WBA welterweight title.

== Background ==
Mark Breland had defeated Harold Volbrecht in February 1987 to claim the vacant WBA welterweight title, which had been vacated by previous champion Lloyd Honeyghan after Honeyghan refused to face the South African Volbrecht due to the country's apartheid policies. After his victory, Breland disclosed that he had broken his left hand in the first round which would require surgery and delay his first title defense for the time being. Breland would return to the ring July winning a non-title tune-up fight before it was announced that he would face the WBA's number-one ranked contender Marlon Starling in August. Breland's original opponent was scheduled to be Tommy Ayers, but Ayers had been upset by journeyman Rollin Williams in June resulting in him losing both his number-one ranking and title shot to Starling.

Though Starling was a veteran of 45 fights, more than double that of Breland, who sported a 18–0 record, Starling entered the fight as an underdog. Starling dismissed Breland's previous opponents feeling that Breland had not fought anyone close to his caliber stating "I'm going to introduce Mark Breland to the pros. I've got more KOs than Breland has fights." Breland, however, sported a sizable height and reach advantage and mentioned as much rebuffing Starling's claims retorting "My advantage is my height and my reach and my smarts, He's an experienced fighter. But I think he's underestimating me by a lot of things they've been saying."

The fight took place in Columbia, South Carolina and was the first world title bout to take place in the state. It was a homecoming of sorts for Breland, as though Breland had been born and raised in Brooklyn, New York, his parents were both from South Carolina and lived in nearby Denmark in a house Breland had purchased for them. Starling's manager Donnie Bowers tried to nullify Breland's hometown advantage by attempting to have the fight moved elsewhere, though he was unsuccessful.

== The Fight ==
Breland used his height and reach advantage over built up a commanding lead on all three scorecards as he landed frequent jabs on the smaller Sterling. However, Starling, despite losing rounds, continually frustrated Breland by frequently clinching and pushing Breland, who went down to canvas eight times as a result of Starling's antics for which referee Tony Perez deducted a point from him in the sixth round. However, in the 11th round, Breland, who had never fought past 10 rounds up that point and was fighting with torn cartilage in his ribs, was stunned after Starling landed a shot to his ribs that sent him into the ropes on the defensive. Starling, realizing Breland was hurt, went on the attack and eventually landed a left hook that sent Breland down. Breland struggled mightily to get back up and Perez, feeling that Breland could not continue, stopped the fight at 1:38 of the round.

== Aftermath ==
Breland hoped for an immediate rematch with Starling, but WBA rules at the time prevented a rematch from happening for the time being.

They would meet again in April 1988.

== Fight card ==
Confirmed bouts:

Weight Class	Weight		vs.		Method	Round	Notes
Welterweight	147 lbs.	Marlon Starling	def.	Mark Breland (c)	TKO	11/15	^{Note 1}
Heavyweight	200+ lbs.	Henry Tillman	def.	Danny Sutton	KO	7/10
Super Lightweight	140 lbs.	Willie Taylor	def.	Roderick Thompson	TKO	1/6
Cruiserweight	190 lbs.	Andre McCall	def.	Terry Denny	KO	4/6
Welterweight	147 lbs.	Curtis Summit	def.	Levon Rouse	TKO	2/6

^Note 1 For WBA Welterweight title

== Broadcasting ==
Country	Broadcaster
United States	ABC

Preceded by vs. Juan Bautista Rondon	Mark Breland's bouts 22 August 1987	Succeeded by vs. Javier Suazo
Preceded by vs. Norberto Bueno	Marlon Starling's bouts 22 August 1987	Succeeded by vs. Fujio Ozaki
