= Barrie Bretland =

Australian rules footballer

Personal information
- Full name: Barrie Bretland
- Born: 19 April 1928
- Died: 28 October 1998 (aged 70)
- Original team: Golden Point
- Height: 180 cm (5 ft 11 in)
- Weight: 78 kg (172 lb)

Playing career^{1}
Years	Club	Games (Goals)
1949–1950	Geelong	15 (2)
- ^{1} Playing statistics correct to the end of 1950.

Barrie Bretland (19 April 1928 – 28 October 1998) was an Australian rules footballer who played with Geelong in the Victorian Football League (VFL).

Bretland, a Golden Point recruit, joined Geelong in 1949. He played eight senior games that year and another seven in the 1950 VFL season. A utility, Bretland was made captain of the Geelong seconds in 1952 but before the beginning of the season was lured to Shepparton to coach Lemnos.

He later became known as a sports journalist.
