= Britland (surname) =

Britland is a British surname. Notable people so named include:

- Hannah Britland (born 1990), British actress and model
- Mary Ann Britland (1847–1886), English serial killer

== See also ==
- Bretland (surname)
- Britain (disambiguation)
- Britain (place name)
