= Tomás Molinares =

Colombian boxer (born 1965)

Personal information
- Nickname: Moli
- Nationality: Colombian
- Born: April 6, 1965 (age 61) Cartagena, Colombia
- Weight: Welterweight

Boxing career

Boxing record
- Total fights: 26
- Wins: 23
- Win by KO: 20
- Losses: 2
- Draws: 0
- No contests: 1

Tomas Molinares (born April 6, 1965, in Cartagena, Colombia) is a Colombian retired boxer and former WBA welterweight champion of the world. He is remembered mostly for his fight with Marlon Starling and the controversial way in which it ended. Behind on the scorecards, Molinares launched a punch that knocked Starling out, but the punch seemingly landed just after the bell to end round six rang. Viewings of the fight's video, both by officials during a WBA inquest right after the bout and on YouTube showings, prove and have proven inconclusive as far as whether Molinares threw the punch in time or not.

== Professional boxing career ==
Tomas Molinares debuted as a professional boxer on October 26, 1984, when he faced 0–1–1 Arnovis Castro at the Bernardo Caraballo Coliseum in Cartagena, winning by decision. On March 1, 1985, Molinares faced the much more experienced Cristobal Torres, who had accumulated a record of 11 wins, 10 losses and 4 draws (ties) in 25 bouts, compared to Molinares' 1–0. He stopped Torres to score his first knockout win as a professional boxer. Wins over Eliseo Benitez and Mateo Valdes followed, and Molinares then challenged for the Colombian national Welterweight title, which was vacant at the time. Molinares fought 3–6–1 Simon Ramos on June 21, 1985, in Cartagena, winning the national championship by knockout.

Winning the national title was followed by wins over Jairo Segovia, Glenroy Savage and Emilio Olivera, all of whom fell by knockout to Molinares' punches. Then Molinares experienced a raise in opposition quality when he boxed the highly experienced Ezequier "Cocoa" Sanchez, a boxer who had faced some of the very best fighters in the world, before trading gloves with Molinares on December 14, 1985, at the Humberto Perea Coliseum in Barranquilla. Molinares stopped Sanchez, winning the bout by technical knockout.

Saul Julio, who, at 16–1–1 was considered another top Colombian prospect at the time, next faced Molinares, Molinares coming on top by knockout on January 31, 1986, in Cartagena. On March 14, 1986, Molinares beat Ruben Veliz and then he faced former WBC FECARBOX regional Welterweight champion, Panamanian Carlos Trujillo, who had recently challenged Milton McCrory for McCrory's WBC world welterweight championship; and who was coming off losing to the heralded South African Harold Volbrecht. On April 30, 1986, at Barranquilla, Molinares outpointed Trujillo. By then, Molinares was ranked among the top ten welterweights around the world by the WBA.

=== Fecarbox title ===
A win over mismatched Edgar Rodriguez (1–3 before their bout) followed the Trujillo victory and then, on November 15, 1986, Molinares faced Mexican Sergio Sanchez, 18–7–1, at the Estadio Metropolitano in Barranquilla. This fight was for the Federacion Caribena de Boxeo's (Fecarbox-Caribbean Boxing Federation) vacant welterweight championship. Molinares won the Caribbean area's title by defeating Sanchez with a knockout. Undefeated Jorge Manchengo (8–0) was dispatched next, a technical knockout victim on December 12, 1986. A couple of wins over mismatched Alberto Lindo (8–3) and Maxiliano Cimarra (1–0) (fought at San Andres Island, the first time Molinares boxed as a professional boxer outside of mainland Colombia) followed, and then, on June 19, 1987, Molinares boxed 10–1–1 Eduardo Bautista in Barranquilla, winning by knockout.

A rematch with Simon Ramos, by now 3–9–1, followed, fight in which Molinares again stopped Ramos, this time on September 4, 1987. Next was Molinares' international debut as a professional boxer, when he faced 11–6–3 Fernando Martinez on October 24, 1987, at the Tamiami Fairgrounds Auditorium in Miami, Florida, United States, as part of an undercard that featured a world championship main event for the WBC world Super Flyweight title between Molinares' countryman Sugar Baby Rojas and former world champion, Argentine Gustavo Ballas. Tomas Molinares won his American debut by knocking Martinez out.

Panama's Eduardo Rodriguez had challenged Donald Curry for Curry's undisputed world Welterweight title, beaten Trujillo and lost to Ruben Dario Palacios before he and Molinares had a showdown on Friday, December 18, 1987, as part of an undercard headed by Fidel Bassa's defense of his WBA world Flyweight title against Felix Marti at the Plaza de Toros Cartagena de Indias in Cartagena. Molinares won this test by knocking Rodriguez (20–8 coming in) out. A win over Emiro Oliveros and one against Eric Perea (10–5) followed, both by knockout. Molinares next challenged Marlon Starling for the American's WBA world welterweight title.

=== World champion ===
With a record of 23–0, 20 wins by knockout, Molinares flew to the United States to fight WBA world welterweight champion Marlon Starling, who had upset Mark Breland to win the championship. Staged on July 29, 1988, at the Atlantic City Convention Hall in Atlantic City, New Jersey, the bout was scheduled to a limit distance of 12 rounds. The referee was Puerto Rican Joe Cortez.

It was a close fight; after five rounds, Starling led on the scorecards of Bernie Soto and Ove Ovesen by a single point, 48–47 on both judges' cards, while Guy Jutras had the bout a tie at 48–48.

The fighting pair were involved in a rather long blows exchange towards the end of round six, Starling being near the ropes at the time. Then they moved, Starling's back facing one of the ring's corners. The two boxers then launched hard, interchanging, over-looping right hands. Starling's missed but Molinares' hit Starling on the button of Starling's chin. About that moment, the bell sounded to finish the round. Starling fell to the floor face-first, and was counted out by referee Cortez. Starling sprained his right ankle after he fell on top of it.

Jim Lampley and Larry Merchant, covering the fight for American television channel HBO, believed that the punch had been launched clearly after the bell. However, video footage shows the punch may have been thrown only a second or so after it rang.

Starling himself was unaware that he had been floored and expressed no knowledge of being counted out by referee Cortez during an interview with Merchant immediately after the bout.

=== Fight controversy ===
The Molinares-Starling bout formed part of a series of famous fights that had controversial endings around that era (including Julio Cesar Chavez Sr. versus Meldrick Taylor I, Greg Haugen versus Miguel Santana, James Douglas versus Mike Tyson and Haugen versus Hector Camacho Sr. I).

Larry Hazzard, the New Jersey State Athletic Commission's chairman at the time, thought that Cortez was right in counting Starling out and giving Molinares the win, declaring that the punch may have landed a fraction of a second after the bell but that Molinares threw it before the bell rang (therefore, at first, Hazzard believed that Molinares had won the bout legally). Upon further review, however, Hazzard changed his mind and declared that the commission would not recognize the bout's original result and it would be therefore changed into a no contest. He, however, deferred the decision whether to continue recognizing Molinares as a world champion or not to the WBA. This was reported on the New York Times sports section on August 12, 1988.

The same day that The New York Times published that information, in Panama City, Panama, the WBA announced that despite the New Jersey commission's change of the fight results, they would continue recognizing Molinares as their official world champion until he lost the title in a boxing fight or abdicated his crown as WBA world welterweight champion. This was also announced, on August 13, on The New York Times.

=== After the Starling fight ===
Molinares started facing trouble to defend his title right away. He reportedly had problems making his division's weight limit of 147 pounds, but on December 16, the Los Angeles Times announced that Molinares would be defending his WBA world championship against former world champion and 1984 Olympic gold medal winner, Mark Breland on February 4. This bout, however, never took place.

Although Molinares, technically at least, had not defeated Starling, he continued undefeated up until that point, with 23 wins, 20 by knockout, and the Starling bout having been declared a no-contest. It was reported from Colombia, however, that the champion was having personal problems, suffering from depression. He vacated the title and took a few months off boxing.

When he returned, on April 15, 1989, he was surprisingly knocked out by the 7–7–2 Horacio Perez, losing his condition as an undefeated boxer. He fought only once more as a professional boxer, suffering an even bigger upset when faced with the debuting Jose Luis Esteven, who also beat the now former world champion by a knockout. Both his two final bouts took place at Barranquilla.

Molinares had a final professional boxing record of 23 wins, 2 losses and one no-contest, with 20 of those wins by knockout. He and Ken Norton stand out as boxers who were world champions despite never having officially won a world/interim world title bout.

== Retirement ==
Molinares, it was reported on such outlets as Guantes boxing magazine, was facing marital problems as well as depression after becoming world champion. It was speculated widely in Colombia that his family had suffered from mental problems for generations. (in Spanish)

It was later reported that after retirement, Molinares was seen working at a warehouse owned by his manager, Willy Chams. After these claims, Chams died, and Molinares' whereabouts are currently unknown, although Boxrec.com states his current residence as being in Barranquilla.

== Professional boxing record ==
26 fights	23 wins	2 losses
By knockout	20	2
By decision	3	0
No contests	1	

No.	Result	Record	Opponent	Type	Round, time	Date	Location	Notes
26	Loss	23–2 (1)	José Luis Esteven	KO	2 (10)	30 Sep 1989	Coliseo Humberto Perea, Barranquilla, Colombia	
25	Loss	23–1 (1)	Horacio Pérez	TKO	3 (10)	15 Apr 1989	Salon Jumbo del Country Club, Barranquilla, Colombia	
24	NC	23–0 (1)	Marlon Starling	NC	6 (12), 3:10	29 Jul 1988	Atlantic City Convention Hall, Atlantic City, New Jersey, U.S.	Won WBA welterweight title; Molinares unintentionally lands a knock-out punch on Starling just after bell sounds to end the 6th round, the New Jersey Commission deemed the bout as a no-contest, the WBA recognized Molinares as the world welterweight champion however Molinares would soon vacate his title
23	Win	23–0	Eric Perea	TKO	4 (10)	30 Apr 1988	Plaza de Troos de Cartagena de Indias, Cartagena, Colombia	
22	Win	22–0	Emiro Oliveros	KO	2 (10)	16 Apr 1988	San Andrés Island, Colombia	
21	Win	21–0	Eduardo Rodríguez	TKO	5 (10)	28 Dec 1987	Plaza de Toros de Cartagena de Indias, Cartagena, Colombia	
20	Win	20–0	Fernando Martínez	TKO	4 (10)	24 Oct 1987	Tamiami Fairgrounds Auditorium, Miami, Florida, U.S.	
19	Win	19–0	Simon Ramos	KO	2 (10)	4 Sep 1987	Plaza de Toros de Cartagena de Indias, Cartagena, Colombia	
18	Win	18–0	Eduardo Batista	TKO	6 (10), 2:58	19 Jun 1987	Barranquilla, Colombia	
17	Win	17–0	Maximiliano Cimarra	KO	3 (10)	4 Apr 1987	San Andrés Island, Colombia	
16	Win	16–0	Alberto Lindo	TKO	4 (10)	13 Feb 1987	Estadio de Tenis del Country Club, Barranquilla, Colombia	
15	Win	15–0	Jorge Manchego	TKO	6 (10)	21 Dec 1986	Estadio 11 de Noviembre, Cartagena, Colombia	
14	Win	14–0	Sergio Sánchez	KO	3 (12)	15 Nov 1986	Estadio Metropolitano, Barranquilla, Colombia	Won vacant WBC FECARBOX welterweight title
13	Win	13–0	Edgar Rodríguez	KO	4 (10)	17 Oct 1986	Barranquilla, Colombia	
12	Win	12–0	Carlos Trujillo	PTS	10	30 Apr 1986	El Salon Country Club, Barranquilla, Colombia	
11	Win	11–0	Rubén Véliz	KO	2 (10)	14 Mar 1986	Coliseo El Campin, Bogotá, Colombia	
10	Win	10–0	Saúl Julio	TKO	7 (10)	31 Jan 1986	Plaza de Toros de Cartagena de Indias, Cartagena, Colombia	
9	Win	9–0	Ezequiel Cocoa Sánchez	TKO	5 (10)	14 Dec 1985	Coliseo Humberto Perea, Barranquilla, Colombia	
8	Win	8–0	Emilio Olivera	TKO	4 (8)	18 Oct 1985	Cartagena, Colombia	
7	Win	7–0	Glenroy Savage	TKO	3 (10)	27 Sep 1985	El Salon Country Club, Barranquilla, Colombia	
6	Win	6–0	Jairo Segovia	KO	5 (6)	30 Aug 1985	Barranquilla, Colombia	
5	Win	5–0	Simon Ramos	KO	9 (12)	21 Jun 1985	Jardin Punta Icaco, Cartagena, Colombia	Won vacant Colombian welterweight title
4	Win	4–0	Mateo Valdez	PTS	8	3 Mar 1985	Barranquilla, Colombia	
3	Win	3–0	Edison Benítez	KO	5 (6)	29 Mar 1985	Barranquilla, Colombia	
2	Win	2–0	Cristóbal Torres	TKO	4 (6)	1 Mar 1985	Barranquilla, Colombia	
1	Win	1–0	Arnovis Castro	UD	6	26 Oct 1984	Coliseo Bernardo Caraballo, Cartagena, Colombia	

== Personal ==
Molinares was once married and has two children.
