= Marlon Starling vs. Mark Breland II =

Boxing match

Starling–Breland II
- Date: April 16, 1988
- Venue: Las Vegas Hilton, Winchester, Nevada, U.S.
- Title(s) on the line: WBA welterweight title

Tale of the tape
| Boxer | Marlon Starling | Mark Breland |
| Nickname | The Magic Man | |
| Hometown | Hartford, Connecticut, U.S. | Brooklyn, New York, U.S. |
| Purse | $425,000 | $150,000 |
| Pre-fight record | 43–4 (26 KO) | 20–1 (13 KO) |
| Age | 28 years, 7 months | 24 years, 11 months |
| Height | 5 ft 8 in (173 cm) | 6 ft 2 in (188 cm) |
| Weight | 147 lb (67 kg) | 146 lb (66 kg) |
| Style | Orthodox | Orthodox |
| Recognition | WBA; Welterweight Champion; The Ring; No. 1 Ranked Welterweight | WBA; No. 1 Ranked Welterweight; The Ring; No. 4 Ranked Welterweight |

Result
- Split draw (116–113, 114–115, 114–114)

Marlon Starling vs. Mark Breland II was a professional boxing match contested on April 16, 1988, for the WBA welterweight title.

== Background ==
On August 22, 1987, then-WBA welterweight champion Mark Breland and top welterweight contender Marlon Starling had fought for the first time with Starling upsetting the undefeated Breland to capture the WBA welterweight title.

Breland hoped for an immediate rematch with Starling, but WBA rules at the time prevented a rematch from happening for the time being. Breland would instead return to the ring in December, defeating Javier Suazo on the undercard of his former Olympic teammate Evander Holyfield's rematch with Dwight Muhammad Qawi.

In February 1988, in what was expected to be a precursor to their rematch, Starling and Breland both participated in a tripleheader event (along with Roberto Durán, who defeated Ricky Stackhouse) billed as Furious Friday. Breland would defeat Juan Alonso Villa by third-round TKO, while Starling would successfully defend his WBA welterweight title against Fujio Ozaki, winning by unanimous decision. With their respective victories, Starling and Breland's rematch was set for April 16, 1988.

== The fights ==
=== Chávez vs. Aguilar ===
The co featured bout saw WBA lightweight champion Julio César Chávez make the first defence of the title he won from Edwin Rosario against Rodolfo Aguilar.

Chávez dropped Aguilar with two straight rights with 7 seconds left of the 1st round, Aguilar was up immediately as the bell rang to end the round. The southpaw Aguilar appeared to frustrate Chávez early in the bout, but the champion kept pressing the attack and landed the heavier blows. Chávez almost dropped Aguilar again in the 5th with a left-right combination before a right landed flush early in the 6th which dropped the challenger for the second time. Aguilar rose at the count of five, only to fall back against the ropes prompting referee Richard Steele to wave it off.

| Preceded by vs. Nicky Perez | Julio César Chávez's bouts 16 April 1988 | Succeeded by vs. Rafael Limón |
| Preceded by vs. Pedro Padilla Estrada | Rodolfo Aguilar's bouts 16 April 1988 | Succeeded by vs. Terrence Alli |

=== Main Event ===
In a largely tactical fight, Starling started off strong, pressing forward, dodging Breland's jabs and effectively counterpunching. Starling took a lead on the judge's scorecards through the first seven rounds, however, Breland would come on strong in the later rounds, losing only the 10th round from the eighth round on. After the fight went the fill 12-round distance, judge Jerry Roth had Starling the winner 116–113, another had Breland the winner 115–114 while the third scored it even 114–114, thus the fight was declared a split draw.

== Fight card ==
Confirmed bouts:

| Weight Class | Weight | | vs. | | Method | Round | Notes |
|---|---|---|---|---|---|---|---|
| Welterweight | 147 lbs. | Marlon Starling (c) | vs. | Mark Breland | D | 12/12 | ^{Note 1} |
| Lightweight | 135 lbs. | Julio César Chávez | def. | Rodolfo Aguilar | TKO | 6/12 | ^{Note 2} |
| Heavyweight | 200+ lbs. | Buster Douglas | def. | Jerry Halstead | TKO | 9/10 |
| Super Middleweight | 168 lbs. | Julian Jackson | def. | Reggie Barnes | KO | 1/10 |
| Super Lightweight | 140 lbs. | Primo Ramos | def. | Kerns Ibarra | TKO | 1/10 |

^Note 1 For WBA Welterweight title
^Note 2 For WBA Lightweight title

== Broadcasting ==
| Country | Broadcaster |
|---|---|
| United States | HBO |

| Preceded by vs. Fujio Ozaki | Marlon Starling's bouts 16 April 1988 | Succeeded by vs. Tomás Molinares |
| Preceded by vs. Juan Alonso Villa | Mark Breland's bouts 16 April 1988 | Succeeded by vs. Pablo Baez |
