= Mark Breland =

American boxer (born 1963)

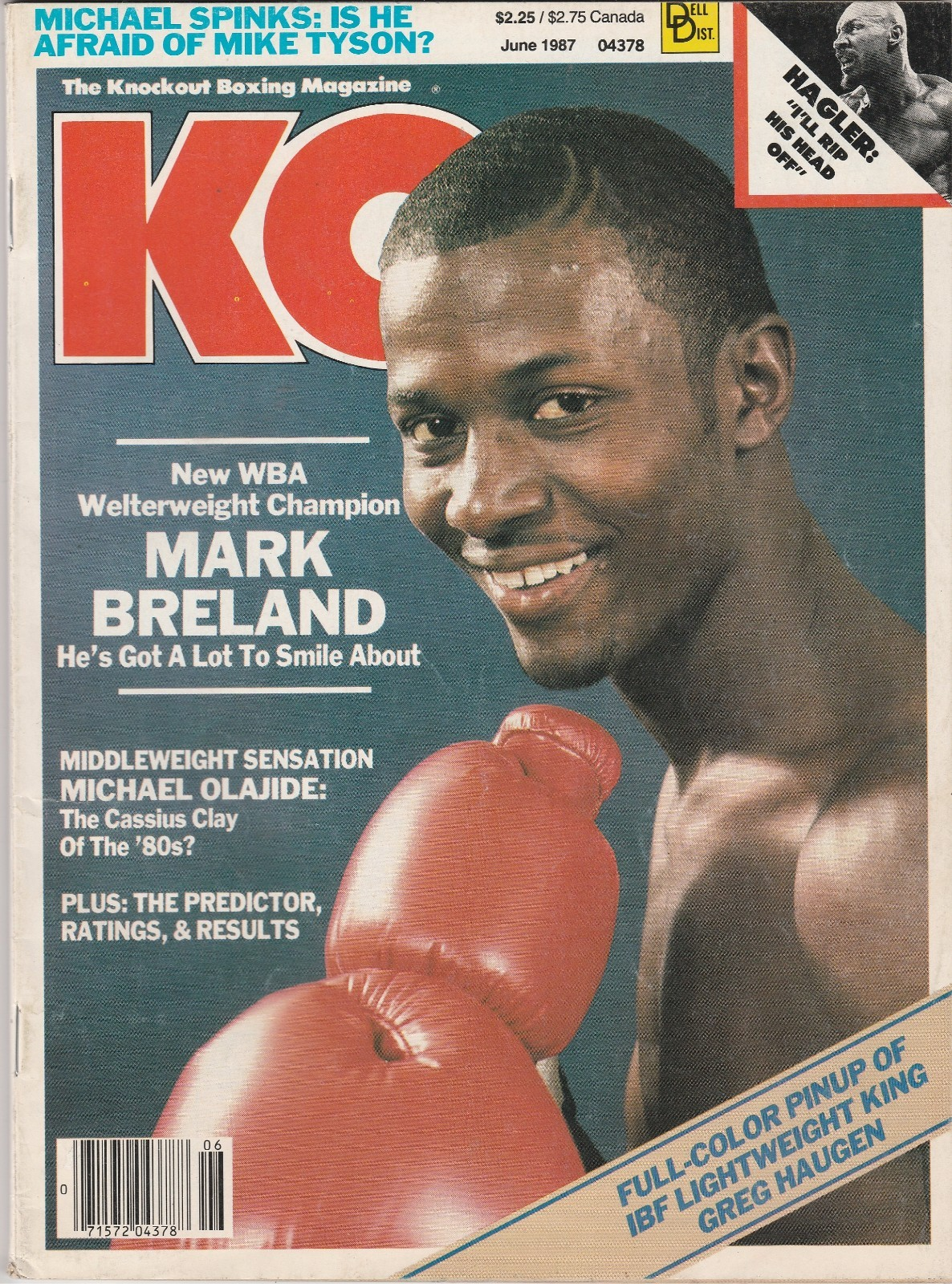
- Breland on the cover of an issue of KO Magazine, cover dated June 1987

Personal information
- Born: Mark Anthony Breland; May 11, 1963 (age 63) Brooklyn, New York, U.S.
- Height: 6 ft 2 1/2 in (189 cm)
- Weight: Welterweight

Boxing career
- Reach: 77 1/2 in (197 cm)
- Stance: Orthodox

Boxing record
- Total fights: 38
- Wins: 35
- Win by KO: 25
- Losses: 3
- Draws: 1
Medal record
Men's boxing
Representing the United States
Olympic Games
Gold medal – first place	1984 Los Angeles	Welterweight
World Championships
Gold medal – first place	1982 Munich	Welterweight

Mark Anthony Breland (born May 11, 1963) is an American boxing trainer. As an amateur, he was a gold medal winner at the 1984 Summer Olympics, with a 110-1 record as an amateur and is regarded among the greatest amateur fighters ever. He competed as a professional from 1984 to 1997, and held the WBA welterweight world title twice between 1987 and 1990. He later became an actor with a wide range of movie and television credits, having made his debut in The Lords of Discipline, and also appeared in the music video for The Pointer Sisters' 1985 hit single, "Dare Me".

== Amateur career ==
Breland was born in Brooklyn, New York and raised in Bedford-Stuyvesant. He began fighting when he was 7 years old, taking on challengers in the lobby and hallways of the housing project where he lived. At 9 years old, he earned a spot on Muhammad Ali's youth boxing camp at his Deer Lake, Pennsylvania, training camp. At 13 he entered the gym and embraced boxing as a way of life. He won five New York Golden Gloves titles (1980–84) with a record of 21–0 (19 KO's), with 14 knockouts coming in the 1st round, surpassing Sugar Ray Robinson for the most wins in the history of the Golden Gloves. Breland is notably the only amateur boxer to have ever been featured on the cover of Ring magazine, and the only amateur whose picture hangs in Colorado Springs U.S. Olympic Training Center. The Smithsonian Museum for African American History and Culture in Washington, DC displays an honorary picture of Mark Breland & his coveted 1984 Olympic team in recognition of their achievements.

At age 18 in 1981 Breland was already being offered huge sums up to $300,000 by boxing promoters to sign a professional contract. Still, he turned them down, partly in anticipation of participating in the 1984 Olympics (and the exposure the Games would bring), and in part scorn: "It's not 'cause I need the money. It's 'cause they need the money. Hey, I can get hurt." Breland always sought to take the fight game on his terms; even then he planned to leave the ring before turning 30.

Breland compiled an impressive amateur ring record of 110–1 (with 73 knockouts). His single loss, to Darryl Anthony was avenged by a 3rd round TKO over Anthony as a professional in a scheduled 10 round bout. Plus one unaccounted loss by medical disqualification, due to withdrawal because of toxic poisoning, which caused Breland to spend most of the fight week in a New York hospital.

Breland won a gold medal at the 1984 Olympics, was awarded the 1982 Boxer of the Year by USAABF, and rated #1 amateur welterweight in the world by AIBA in 1984.

Breland was so exceptional as an amateur that he had been having trouble getting sparring partners in the Bedford-Stuyvesant Boxing Association Gym. Fighters were known to delay their trip to the coveted NYC Daily News Golden Gloves during Mark Breland's five year consecutive reign in order to avoid facing him. In June 1984, when he was preparing himself for the forthcoming National Olympic Trials, he went to Grossinger, New York, to train with the Kronks, there he sparred with WBC Super Welterweight champion Thomas Hearns, who in turn was preparing to fight Roberto Durán. At that time Breland was being trained by Emanuel Steward. At that time he narrowly escaped bigger troubles, falling under destructive influence of his teammate Ricky Womack, who happened to be an authoritative figure for Breland, eventually was sentenced and jailed.

== Professional career ==
Breland turned professional in 1984. In 1987 he won the vacant WBA welterweight world title by defeating Harold Volbrecht by TKO in the seventh round. He lost it in his first defense to Marlon Starling. In 1989 Breland again won the vacant WBA welterweight world title by defeating another contender, Seung Soon Lee, by first round knockout on 4 February 1989, in Las Vegas, Nevada. He made four successful title defenses (most notably, one against Lloyd Honeyghan) before losing it to Aaron Davis in a back-and-forth 9-round contest that was nearly called off twice because of injuries to Davis' eye before Breland was knocked out in round 9.

Breland retired in 1997 with a professional record of 35–3–1 (25 KOs). His losses were to Jorge Vaca, Aaron Davis, and Marlon Starling, with whom he also earned his only draw.

== Boxing Trainer ==
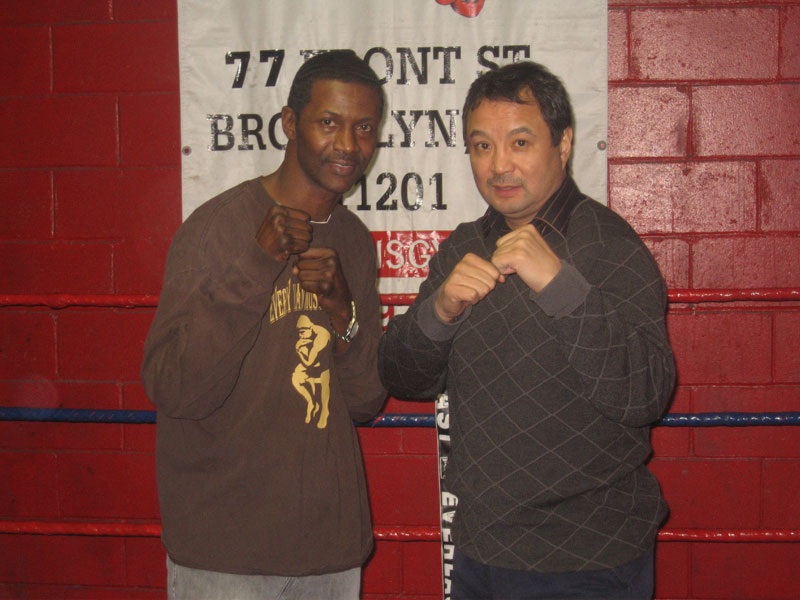
Breland (left) and Serik Konakbayev (right) in 2010

Breland has served as a boxing trainer, having had Vernon Forrest and former WBC heavyweight world champion Deontay Wilder among other notable clients. In recent years, he has been an assistant trainer for Jermall Charlo.

== Amateur highlights ==
- Won the 39th Intercity Golden Gloves in the welterweight division, Madison Square Garden, New York City, April 1981:
  - Defeated Efrain Bennett KO 1
- Participated in the United States National Championships, in Concord, California, May 1981:
  - 1/4: Lost to Darryl Anthony by split decision, 2–3

(This would be Breland's only loss as an amateur.)

- Won the U.S. National Sports Festival (Welterweight) in Syracuse, New York, July 1981:
  - 1/2: Defeated Roman George RSC 3
  - Finals: Defeated Darryl Robinson RSC 1
- United States Welterweight Champion, Charlotte, North Carolina, April 1982:
  - 1/4: Defeated Ron Essett RSC 1
  - 1/2: Defeated Frank Warren by unanimous decision, 5–0
  - Finals: Defeated Louis Howard RSCH 2 (2:51)
- Made the U.S. National Team at the World Champ Box-Offs in Colorado Springs, Colorado, April 1982:
  - Defeated Louis Howard
- Gold medal at the World Championships (Welterweight) in Munich, West Germany, May 1982:
  - 1/16: Defeated Vesa Koskela (Sweden) RET 2
  - 1/8: Defeated Mihai Ciubotaru (Romania) KO 1
  - 1/4: Defeated Jenő Danyi (Hungary) by unanimous decision, 5–0
  - 1/2: Defeated Manfred Zielonka (West Germany) by unanimous decision, 5–0
  - Finals: Defeated Serik Konakbayev (Soviet Union) by unanimous decision, 5–0
- Won the USA–Poland Duals (Welterweight) in Caesars Palace, Las Vegas, Nevada, October 1982:
  - Defeated Stanisław Marczyński (Poland) by unanimous decision, 3–0
- Withdrew from the United States National Championships, in Indianapolis, Indiana, December 1982:
  - 1/16: Lost to Kurt Whitesell by medical walkover
- Won the AIBA International Challenge (Welterweight) in Korakuen Hall, Tokyo, Japan, May 1983:
  - Defeated Yong Beom Chung (South Korea) by unanimous decision, 5–0
- United States Welterweight Champion, Colorado Springs, Colorado, November 1983:
  - 1/16: Defeated Bill Harrington RSC 3
  - 1/8: Defeated Tony Golden RSC 2
  - 1/4: Defeated Larry Gentile by decision
  - 1/2: Defeated Alton Rice by unanimous decision, 5–0
  - Finals: Defeated James Mitchell RSC 2
- Won the AIBA International Challenge (Welterweight) in Los Angeles, California, April 1984:
  - Defeated Luciano Bruno (Italy) by decision
- Qualified as a Welterweight at the National Olympic Trials in Fort Worth, Texas, June 1984:
  - 1/4: Defeated Mylon Watkins KO 1
  - 1/2: Defeated Louis Howard by unanimous decision, 5–0
  - Finals: Defeated Davey Gutierrez by unanimous decision, 5–0
- Made the U.S. National Team at the Olympic Box-Offs in Las Vegas, Nevada, July 1984:
  - Defeated Louis Howard by unanimous decision, 5–0
- Gold medal at the 1984 Summer Olympics (Welterweight) in Los Angeles, California, July–August 1984:
  - 1/32: Defeated Wayne Gordon (Canada) by unanimous decision, 5–0
  - 1/16: Defeated Carlos Reyes (Puerto Rico) RSC 3
  - 1/8: Defeated Rudel Obreja (Romania) by unanimous decision, 5–0
  - 1/4: Defeated Genaro Leon (Mexico) KO 1
  - 1/2: Defeated Luciano Bruno (Italy) by unanimous decision, 5–0
  - Finals: Defeated Yong-Su Ahn (South Korea) by unanimous decision, 5–0

== Professional boxing record ==
39 fights	35 wins	3 losses
By knockout	25	3
By decision	10	0
Draws	1	

No.	Result	Record	Opponent	Type	Round, time	Date	Location	Notes
39	Win	35–3–1	Rick Haynes	UD	10	Mar 21, 1997	Riverfront Sports Arena, Jacksonville, Florida, U.S.	
38	Win	34–3–1	Bobby Butters	TKO	2 (10), 1:49	Jan 10, 1997	Riverfront Sports Arena, Jacksonville, Florida, U.S.	
37	Win	33–3–1	Darryl Lattimore	UD	10	Jun 7, 1996	Madison Square Garden, New York City, New York, U.S.	
36	Win	32–3–1	Buck Smith	KO	3 (10), 0:25	May 19, 1996	The Palace of Auburn Hills, Auburn Hills, Michigan, U.S.	
35	Win	31–3–1	Ricardo Smith	TKO	3 (10), 0:30	Jan 27, 1996	Schwartz Athletic Center, Brooklyn, New York, U.S.	
34	Loss	30–3–1	Jorge Vaca	TKO	6 (10), 1:37	Sep 13, 1991	ARCO Arena, Sacramento, California, U.S.	
33	Win	30–2–1	Julian Samaha	TKO	1 (10), 0:44	Jul 12, 1991	Caesars Tahoe, Stateline, Nevada, U.S.	
32	Win	29–2–1	Henry Anaya Jr.	UD	10	Jun 10, 1991	Meadowlands Convention Center, Secaucus, New Jersey, U.S.	
31	Win	28–2–1	Ariel Conde	KO	1 (10), 0:23	Apr 9, 1991	The Palace of Auburn Hills, Auburn Hills, Michigan, U.S.	
30	Loss	27–2–1	Aaron Davis	KO	9 (12), 2:56	Jul 8, 1990	Harrah's, Reno, Nevada, U.S.	Lost WBA welterweight title
29	Win	27–1–1	Lloyd Honeyghan	TKO	3 (12)	Mar 3, 1990	Wembley Arena, London, England, U.K.	Retained WBA welterweight title
28	Win	26–1–1	Fujio Ozaki	TKO	4 (12), 0:34	Dec 10, 1989	Korakuen Hall, Tokyo, Japan	Retained WBA welterweight title
27	Win	25–1–1	Mauro Martelli	TKO	2 (12), 1:15	Oct 13, 1989	Patinoire des Vernets, Geneva, Switzerland	Retained WBA welterweight title
26	Win	24–1–1	Rafael Pineda	TKO	5 (12), 1:14	Apr 22, 1989	Trump Castle, Atlantic City, New Jersey, U.S.	Retained WBA welterweight title
25	Win	23–1–1	Seung-Soon Lee	TKO	1 (12), 0:54	Feb 4, 1989	Caesars Palace, Paradise, Nevada, U.S.	Won vacant WBA welterweight title
24	Win	22–1–1	Ozzie O'Neal	KO	1 (10), 1:46	Oct 7, 1988	The Palace of Auburn Hills, Auburn Hills, Michigan, U.S.	
23	Win	21–1–1	Pablo Baez	KO	1 (10), 1:43	Aug 11, 1988	DiVinci Manor, Chicago, Illinois, U.S.	
22	Draw	20–1–1	Marlon Starling	SD	12	Apr 16, 1988	Las Vegas Hilton, Winchester, Nevada, U.S.	For WBA welterweight title
21	Win	20–1	Juan Alonso Villa	TKO	3 (10), 2:03	Feb 5, 1988	Atlantic City Convention Center, Atlantic City, New Jersey, U.S.	
20	Win	19–1	Javier Suazo	UD	10	Dec 5, 1987	Atlantic City Convention Center, Atlantic City, New Jersey, U.S.	
19	Loss	18–1	Marlon Starling	TKO	11 (15), 1:38	Aug 22, 1987	Township Auditorium, Columbia, South Carolina, U.S.	Lost WBA welterweight title
18	Win	18–0	Juan Bautista Rondon	UD	10	Jul 10, 1987	Forte Village Resort, Sardinia, Italy	
17	Win	17–0	Harold Volbrecht	TKO	7 (15), 2:07	Feb 6, 1987	Trump Plaza Hotel and Casino, Atlantic City, New Jersey, U.S.	Won vacant WBA welterweight title
16	Win	16–0	Orlando Orozco	TKO	2 (10), 1:46	Nov 13, 1986	Felt Forum, New York City, New York, U.S.	
15	Win	15–0	Ralph Twinning	KO	1 (10), 2:08	Oct 15, 1986	Township Auditorium, Columbia, South Carolina, U.S.	
14	Win	14–0	Reggie Miller	KO	2 (10), 1:41	Sep 14, 1986	Harrah's, Atlantic City, New Jersey, U.S.	
13	Win	13–0	John Munduga	TKO	6 (10), 2:18	Jun 21, 1986	The Sands, Atlantic City, New Jersey, U.S.	
12	Win	12–0	Ricky Avendano	KO	1 (10), 1:06	May 15, 1986	Felt Forum, New York City, New York, U.S.	
11	Win	11–0	Darryl Anthony	TKO	3 (10), 2:14	Apr 12, 1986	Ice World, Totowa, New Jersey, U.S.	
10	Win	10–0	Richard Aguirre	KO	1 (10), 1:33	Mar 2, 1986	Lancaster Host Resort, Lancaster, Pennsylvania, U.S.	
9	Win	9–0	Troy Wortham	UD	10	Jan 25, 1986	Lancaster Host Resort, Lancaster, Pennsylvania, U.S.	
8	Win	8–0	Hedgemon Robertson	UD	8	Dec 21, 1985	Pavilion Convention Center, Virginia Beach, Virginia, U.S.	
7	Win	7–0	Donald Gwinn	KO	2 (8), 1:32	Oct 18, 1985	Felt Forum, New York City, New York, U.S.	
6	Win	6–0	Don Shiver	TKO	1 (8), 2:18	Jul 20, 1985	Norfolk Scope, Norfolk, Virginia, U.S.	
5	Win	5–0	Dario DeJesus	KO	2 (6), 2:49	Jun 19, 1985	Ice World, Totowa, New Jersey, U.S.	
4	Win	4–0	Vince Dunfee	KO	2 (6), 2:13	May 17, 1985	Caesars Tahoe, Stateline, Nevada, U.S.	
3	Win	3–0	Steve Little	UD	6	Apr 6, 1985	Coliseum, San Angelo, Texas, U.S.	
2	Win	2–0	Marlon Palmer	UD	6	Jan 5, 1985	Harrah's Marina, Atlantic City, New Jersey, U.S.	
1	Win	1–0	Dwight Williams	UD	6	Nov 15, 1984	Madison Square Garden, New York City, New York, U.S.	

== See also ==
- List of world welterweight boxing champions

Sporting positions
Amateur boxing titles
Previous: Darryl Robinson	U.S. welterweight champion 1982–1983	Next: Darryl Lattimore
World boxing titles
Vacant Title last held by Lloyd Honeyghan	WBA welterweight champion February 6, 1987 – August 22, 1987	Succeeded by Marlon Starling
Vacant Title last held by Tomás Molinares	WBA welterweight champion February 4, 1989 – July 8, 1990	Succeeded by Aaron Davis
Awards
Previous: Kenny Baysmore	The Ring Prospect of the Year; 1984	Next: Mike Tyson
