= Rafael Pineda (boxer) =

Colombian boxer

Rafael Pineda (born January 12, 1966, in Barranquilla, Colombia) is a former Colombian boxer who was the IBF Light Welterweight world champion. He won the world title by beating Roger Mayweather with a 9-round knockout

== Professional career ==
Known as "Derby", Pineda turned pro in 1986 and in 1989 took on former Olympian Mark Breland for the WBA welterweight title, but was TKO'd in the fifth round. In 1991 he won the vacant IBF Light Welterweight title by beating Roger Mayweather with a ninth-round knockout. He successfully defended the title once before losing it by decision to welterweight legend Pernell Whitaker in 1992. Pineda retired after the loss, but came back in 1996.

== Comeback ==
Pineda launched a comeback in 1996 and fought for a few years in his native Colombia before taking on Cory Spinks in 2002, losing a technical decision. In 2004 he lost a close split decision to phenom Zab Judah. He has not fought since the loss.

== Personal ==
Pineda is the brother of fellow boxer Hugo Pineda.

Sporting positions
World boxing titles
Vacant Title last held by Julio César Chávez	IBF light welterweight champion 7 December 1991 – 18 July 1992	Succeeded by Pernell Whitaker
