= New Jersey State Athletic Control Board =

State agency of New Jersey, United States

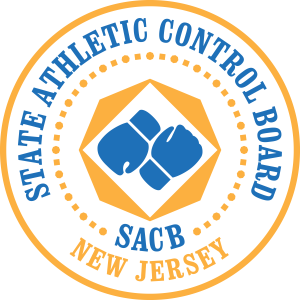
- Seal of the NJSACB

Board overview
- Formed: March 15, 1985; 41 years ago
- Jurisdiction: Government of New Jersey
- Headquarters: Richard J. Hughes Justice Complex 25 Market Street, Trenton, New Jersey
- Board executives: Larry Hazzard, Commissioner; Tony Orlando, Chairman
- Parent department: New Jersey Department of Law and Public Safety
- Website: Office website

The New Jersey State Athletic Control Board (SACB) regulates all contests and exhibitions of unarmed combat within the state of New Jersey, including licensure and supervision of promoters, boxers, kickboxers, mixed martial arts fighters, seconds, ring officials, managers, and matchmakers. The Commission is the final authority on licensing matters, having the ability to approve, deny, revoke, or suspend all licenses for unarmed combat.

The State Athletic Control Board was established by the Legislature in 1985 to ensure that all public boxing and other combative sports exhibitions, events, performances and contests are subject to an effective and efficient system of strict control and regulation. The Board's main purpose is to protect the safety and well being of all participants and promote the public confidence and trust in the regulatory process and conduct of public boxing and other combative sports.

Formerly part of the New Jersey Division of Gaming Enforcement, the SACB is now a self-contained board within the Department of Law & Public Safety under the direction of the Office of the Attorney General.

== MMA Rules ==
The current rules for the Ultimate Fighting Championship were originally established by the New Jersey Athletic Control Board. The Unified Rules of Mixed Martial Arts that New Jersey established has been adopted in other states that regulate mixed martial arts, including Nevada, Louisiana and California. These rules are also used by many other promotions within the United States and are mandatory for those states that have adopted the Unified Rules, and so have become the standard de facto set of rules for professional mixed martial arts across North America and Europe.

== Commissioners ==
Larry Hazzard, a former boxing referee, served as commissioner from 1985 to 2007.

Aaron Davis served as commissioner from 2008 to 2014, when he was replaced by Larry Hazzard, who returned for a second stint as commissioner.

== Related legislation ==
- 1985: Act of March 15, 1985, P.L. 1985, c. 83

== See also ==
- Association of Boxing Commissions
