= Marlon Starling =

American boxer (born 1959)

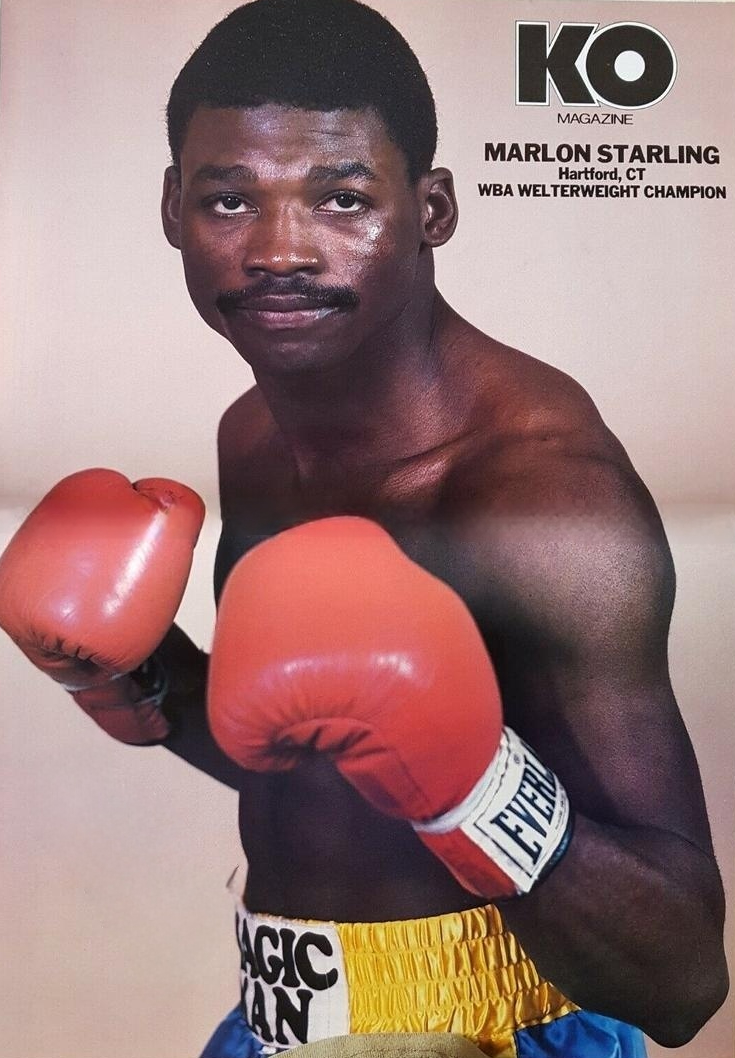
- Starling in 1987

Personal information
- Nickname: Magic Man
- Born: August 29, 1959 (age 67) Hartford, Connecticut, U.S.
- Height: 5 ft 8 in (173 cm)
- Weight: Welterweight; Middleweight

Boxing career
- Reach: 74 in (188 cm)
- Stance: Orthodox

Boxing record
- Total fights: 52
- Wins: 45
- Win by KO: 27
- Losses: 6
- Draws: 1

Marlon Starling (born August 29, 1959) is an American former professional boxer who competed from 1979 to 1990. He held the WBA welterweight title from 1987 to 1988 and the WBC welterweight title from 1989 to 1990.

== Professional boxing career ==
Starling was born in Hartford, Connecticut in 1959. He got his start with help from coach, Johnny Duke, who helped him train for the national Junior Olympics championship. He turned professional in 1979. After 25 straight wins to start his professional career, he lost his first fight, a 12-round split-decision to Donald Curry in 1982. Starling had a rematch with Curry in 1984, challenging for the WBA and IBF welterweight titles. Starling lost by a 15-round decision. Starling's fighting style features what is referred to as a high guard.

Starling's second world title fight came in 1987. He knocked out Mark Breland in the 11th round to win the WBA welterweight title. In his third title defense, Starling lost the title in controversial fashion to Tomas Molinares. Molinares hit Starling with a punch that was thrown around the same time as the bell sounded to end round six. Starling went down for the only time in his career, and the referee counted him out. Molinares was declared the new champion by knock out. However, the decision was later changed to a no contest but the Colombian kept the title.

In 1989, Starling knocked out Lloyd Honeyghan to win the WBC welterweight titles. The following year, Starling challenged Michael Nunn for the IBF middleweight title, but lost by decision. In his next fight, Starling lost his welterweight titles in a close decision to Maurice Blocker. That was Starling's last fight. He retired with a record of 45-6-1-1 (27 KOs).

== Professional boxing record ==
53 fights	45 wins	6 losses
By knockout	27	0
By decision	18	6
Draws	1	
No contests	1	

No.	Result	Record	Opponent	Type	Round, time	Date	Age	Location	Notes
53	Loss	45–6–1 (1)	Maurice Blocker	MD	12	Aug 19, 1990	30 years, 228 days	Bally's Hotel & Casino, Reno, Nevada, U.S.	Lost WBC welterweight title
52	Loss	45–5–1 (1)	Michael Nunn	MD	12	Apr 14, 1990	30 years, 228 days	Mirage Hotel & Casino, Las Vegas, Nevada, U.S.	For IBF middleweight title
51	Win	45–4–1 (1)	Young Kil Jung	UD	12	Sep 15, 1989	30 years, 17 days	Civic Center, Hartford, Connecticut, U.S.	Retained WBC welterweight title
50	Win	44–4–1 (1)	Lloyd Honeyghan	TKO	9 (12), 1:19	Feb 4, 1989	29 years, 159 days	Caesars Palace, Las Vegas, Nevada, U.S.	Won WBC welterweight title
49	NC	43–4–1 (1)	Tomás Molinares	NC	6 (12), 3:10	Jul 29, 1988	28 years, 335 days	Convention Hall, Atlantic City, New Jersey, U.S.	WBA welterweight title at stake; Originally KO for Molinares; NC after declared the punch landed after the bell
48	Draw	43–4–1	Mark Breland	SD	12	Apr 16, 1988	28 years, 231 days	Hilton Hotel, Las Vegas, Nevada, U.S.	Retained WBA welterweight title
47	Win	43–4	Fujio Ozaki	UD	12	Feb 5, 1988	28 years, 160 days	Convention Center, Atlantic City, New Jersey, U.S.	Retained WBA welterweight title
46	Win	42–4	Mark Breland	TKO	11 (15), 1:38	Aug 22, 1987	27 years, 358 days	Township Auditorium, Columbia, South Carolina, U.S.	Won WBA welterweight title
45	Win	41–4	Norberto Bueno	KO	3 (10), 1:49	Jun 5, 1987	27 years, 280 days	Civic Center, Hartford, Connecticut, U.S.	
44	Win	40–4	Pedro Vilella	UD	10	Feb 18, 1987	27 years, 173 days	Civic Center Assembly Hall, Hartford, Connecticut, U.S.	
43	Win	39–4	Roberto Mendez	TKO	4 (10), 1:42	Oct 30, 1986	27 years, 62 days	Civic Center, Hartford, Connecticut, U.S.	
42	Win	38–4	Dexter Smith	KO	5 (10)	Sep 19, 1986	27 years, 11 days	Bulkeley High School, Hartford, Connecticut, U.S.	
41	Loss	37–4	Johnny Bumphus	TD	6 (12)	May 18, 1986	26 years, 262 days	Civic Center, Providence, Rhode Island, U.S.	Lost USBA welterweight title; Accidental headbutt
40	Win	37–3	Ralph Twinning	TKO	7 (10)	Apr 6, 1986	26 years, 220 days	Americana Congress Hotel, Chicago, Illinois, U.S.	
39	Win	36–3	Leo Davis	KO	2 (10), 0:51	Jan 24, 1986	26 years, 148 days	Civic Center, Hartford, Connecticut, U.S.	
38	Win	35–3	Simon Brown	SD	12	Nov 22, 1985	26 years, 85 days	Sands Casino Hotel, Atlantic City, New Jersey, U.S.	Retained USBA welterweight title
37	Win	34–3	Reggie Miller	UD	10	Aug 7, 1985	25 years, 343 days	Atlantis Hotel & Casino, Atlantic City, New Jersey, U.S.	
36	Win	33–3	Floyd Mayweather Sr.	UD	12	Apr 26, 1985	25 years, 240 days	Tropicana Hotel & Casino, Atlantic City, New Jersey, U.S.	Retained USBA welterweight title
35	Loss	32–3	Pedro Vilella	MD	12	Jun 15, 1984	24 years, 291 days	Madison Square Garden, New York City, New York, U.S.	Lost NABF welterweight title
34	Win	32–2	Lupe Aquino	UD	12	Apr 17, 1984	24 years, 232 days	Playboy Hotel & Casino, Atlantic City, New Jersey, U.S.	Retained USBA and NABF welterweight titles
33	Loss	31–2	Donald Curry	UD	15	Feb 4, 1984	24 years, 159 days	Ballys Park Place Hotel Casino, Atlantic City, New Jersey, U.S.	For WBA and inaugural IBF welterweight titles
32	Win	31–1	Bob Graddy	KO	3 (10), 2:09	Nov 26, 1983	24 years, 89 days	Civic Center, Hartford, Connecticut, U.S.	
31	Win	30–1	Sammy Rookard	TKO	5 (10)	Nov 10, 1983	24 years, 73 days	Civic Center Coliseum, Hartford, Connecticut, U.S.	
30	Win	29–1	Tommy Ayers	MD	12	Jul 24, 1983	23 years, 329 days	Showboat Hotel & Casino, Sports Pavilion, Las Vegas, Nevada, U.S.	Retained USBA and NABF welterweight titles
29	Win	28–1	Kevin Howard	UD	12	Apr 23, 1983	23 years, 237 days	Civic Center Coliseum, Hartford, Connecticut, U.S.	Won vacant USBA and NABF welterweight titles
28	Win	27–1	Jose Baret	KO	4 (10)	Feb 5, 1983	23 years, 160 days	Sands Casino Hotel, Atlantic City, New Jersey, U.S.	
27	Win	26–1	Manuel Madera	KO	3 (10), 0:42	Jan 7, 1983	23 years, 131 days	Civic Center Coliseum, Hartford, Connecticut, U.S.	
26	Loss	25–1	Donald Curry	SD	12	Oct 23, 1982	23 years, 55 days	Convention Hall, Atlantic City, New Jersey, U.S.	Lost USBA welterweight title; For NABF welterweight title
25	Win	25–0	Inocencio De la Rosa	UD	10	Sep 10, 1982	23 years, 12 days	Civic Center Coliseum, Hartford, Connecticut, U.S.	
24	Win	24–0	Kevin Morgan	TKO	1 (12), 2:06	Jul 17, 1982	22 years, 322 days	Felt Forum, New York City, New York, U.S.	Won USBA welterweight title
23	Win	23–0	Babilah McCarthy	TKO	9 (10), 0:44	Jun 5, 1982	22 years, 280 days	Civic Center Coliseum, Hartford, Connecticut, U.S.	
22	Win	22–0	Ricardo Raul Camoranesi	KO	3 (10), 2:42	Apr 23, 1982	22 years, 237 days	Coliseum, New Haven, Connecticut, U.S.	
21	Win	21–0	Jose Luis Santana	KO	1 (10), 3:05	Mar 22, 1982	22 years, 205 days	Civic Center Coliseum, Hartford, Connecticut, U.S.	
20	Win	20–0	Danny Paul	UD	10	Jan 29, 1982	22 years, 153 days	Civic Center, Hartford, Connecticut, U.S.	
19	Win	19–0	Jack Morrell	TKO	2 (10), 1:51	Aug 28, 1981	20 years, 365 days	Felt Forum, New York City, New York, U.S.	
18	Win	18–0	Juan Hidalgo	TKO	5 (10), 0:42	Jun 25, 1981	20 years, 301 days	Madison Square Garden, New York City, New York, U.S.	
17	Win	17–0	Johnny Cooper	TKO	1 (10), 2:01	May 29, 1981	20 years, 274 days	Civic Center, Hartford, Connecticut, U.S.	
16	Win	16–0	Miguel Angel Hernandez	TKO	8 (10), 0:38	Apr 24, 1981	20 years, 239 days	Felt Forum, New York City, New York, U.S.	
15	Win	15–0	Floyd Mayweather Sr.	UD	10	Mar 9, 1981	20 years, 193 days	Civic Center Assembly Hall, Hartford, Connecticut, U.S.	
14	Win	14–0	Bruce Strauss	KO	2 (10), 1:20	Feb 9, 1981	20 years, 164 days	Civic Center, Hartford, Connecticut, U.S.	
13	Win	13–0	Ruby Ortiz	UD	10	Jan 16, 1981	20 years, 140 days	Civic Center, Hartford, Connecticut, U.S.	
12	Win	12–0	Curtis Taylor	UD	10	Nov 25, 1980	21 years, 88 days	Civic Center, Hartford, Connecticut, U.S.	
11	Win	11–0	Dave Bolden	TKO	3 (8), 2:49	Nov 3, 1980	21 years, 66 days	Civic Center, Hartford, Connecticut, U.S.	
10	Win	10–0	Benji Goldstone	TKO	5 (8), 2:14	Jun 20, 1980	20 years, 296 days	Civic Center Assembly Hall, Hartford, Connecticut, U.S.	
9	Win	9–0	Eddie Campbell	UD	8	May 23, 1980	20 years, 268 days	Civic Center Assembly Hall, Hartford, Connecticut, U.S.	
8	Win	8–0	Feliciano Cintron	TKO	6 (8), 1:03	Apr 8, 1980	20 years, 223 days	Civic Center, Hartford, Connecticut, U.S.	
7	Win	7–0	Frank Minnigan	TKO	4 (8), 0:15	Feb 28, 1980	20 years, 183 days	Civic Center, Hartford, Connecticut, U.S.	
6	Win	6–0	Charles Newell	KO	7 (8)	Jan 9, 1980	20 years, 133 days	Civic Center Assembly Hall, Hartford, Connecticut, U.S.	Newell died of injuries sustained from the fight.
5	Win	5–0	John Saxton	TKO	4 (6), 2:53	Nov 5, 1979	20 years, 68 days	Civic Center, Hartford, Connecticut, U.S.	
4	Win	4–0	Hector Ortiz	PTS	6	Oct 17, 1979	20 years, 49 days	Civic Center Assembly Hall, Hartford, Connecticut, U.S.	
3	Win	3–0	Jerry North	PTS	4	Sep 27, 1979	20 years, 29 days	Polish National Hall, Bristol, Connecticut, U.S.	
2	Win	2–0	Hubert Jackson	UD	4	Sep 7, 1979	20 years, 9 days	Civic Center, Hartford, Connecticut, U.S.	
1	Win	1–0	Tim LaValley	TKO	3 (4), 1:04	Jul 27, 1979	19 years, 332 days	Civic Center Assembly Hall, Hartford, Connecticut, U.S.	

== See also ==
- List of world welterweight boxing champions

Sporting positions
Regional boxing titles
Preceded by Kevin Morgan	USBA Welterweight champion July 17, 1982 – October 23, 1982	Succeeded by Donald Curry
Vacant Title last held by Donald Curry	USBA Welterweight champion April 23, 1983 – May 18, 1986	Succeeded by Johnny Bumphus
Vacant Title last held by Donald Curry	NABF Welterweight champion April 23, 1983 – June 15, 1984	Succeeded by Pedro Vilella
World boxing titles
Preceded by Mark Breland	WBA Welterweight champion August 22, 1987 – July 29, 1988	Succeeded by Tomás Molinares
Preceded by Lloyd Honeyghan	WBC Welterweight champion February 4, 1989 – August 19, 1990	Succeeded by Maurice Blocker
Preceded by Lloyd Honeyghan	The Ring Welterweight champion February 4, 1989 – March 2, 1989; Title terminated	Vacant Title next held by Vernon Forrest; Title reintroduced
