= Kalambay =

Kalambay is both a surname and a given name. Notable people with the name include:

- Mike Kalambay (born 1987), Congolese singer-songwriter
- Patrick Kalambay (born 1984), Italian footballer
- Sumbu Kalambay (born 1956), Italian boxer
- Kalambay Otepa (1948-2024), Congolese footballer
