= Sean Mannion (boxer) =

Irish boxer (born 1956)

Sean Mannion (born 6 October 1956) is a former boxer in the light middleweight division. During his career he was based in and boxed out of Massachusetts in the United States. His most notable bout was against Mike McCallum for the vacant WBA title, which he lost over a fifteen-round unanimous decision. In January 2014, Rocky Ros Muc: Seán Ó Mainnín, a biography about Mannion's life and career, written by Rónán Mac Con Iomaire, was released. The book is written in Irish but an English version was also released. A film adaptation was released in July 2017 under the same title, produced and directed by Michael Fanning. RTÉ Documentary on One made a programme about Sean's story - Never Knocked Down - produced by Robert Mulhern which won gold in the 2015 Celtic Media Awards.

== Professional boxing record ==
42 Wins (14 knockouts, 28 decisions), 14 Losses (3 knockouts, 11 decisions), 1 Draw Archived 25 April 2014 at the Wayback Machine
Result	Record	Opponent	Type	Round	Date	Location	Notes
Win	42–14–1	(United States) Terrence Walker	PTS	10	1993-03-17	(United States) Chelsea, Massachusetts	
Loss	41–14–1	(United States) Fabian Garcia	UD	10	1993-02-26	(United States) Westin Hotel, Boston, Massachusetts	
Win	41–13–1	(Puerto Rico) Miguel Rosa	TKO	6	1992-12-10	(United States) Teachers' Union Hall, Boston, Massachusetts	
Win	40–13–1	(United States) Mike O'Han	UD	8	1992-09-28	(United States) Vista International Hotel, Waltham, Massachusetts	
Loss	39–13–1	(Poland) Dariusz Michalczewski	TKO	3	1992-02-21	Legien Center, Berlin, Germany	
Win	39–12–1	(Puerto Rico) Miguel Rosa	UD	8	1991-03-14	(United States) Teachers' Union Hall, Dorchester, Massachusetts	
Loss	38–12–1	(Germany) Henry Maske	PTS	8	1990-11-16	Alsterdorfer Sporthalle, Hamburg, Germany	
Loss	38–11–1	(Brazil) Nelson Alves	UD	10	1990-10-05	Philips Halle, Düsseldorf, Germany	
Loss	38–10–1	(United States) David Vedder	UD	10	1989-09-16	(United States) San Francisco Civic Auditorium, San Francisco, California	
Loss	38–9–1	(France) Pierre-Frank Winterstein	PTS	8	1987-11-16	Cirque d'hiver, Paris, France	
Loss	38–8–1	(United States) Fred Hutchings	PTS	10	1987-02-07	(United States) Stockton, California	
Win	38–7–1	(United States) Doug Mallett	PTS	8	1986-12-20	(United States) The Strand, Boston, Massachusetts	
Loss	37–7–1	(United Kingdom) Errol Christie	PTS	10	1986-10-29	(United Kingdom) Alexandra Palace, Muswell Hill, London, England	
Win	37–6–1	(Puerto Rico) Jose Quinones	PTS	10	1986-08-29	(United States) Lowell Memorial Auditorium, Lowell, Massachusetts	
Win	36–6–1	(United States) Fred Hutchings	PTS	10	1986-05-02	(United States) Stockton, California	
Win	35–6–1	(Jamaica) Wesley Reid	UD	8	1986-03-15	(United States) Sahara, Dorchester, Massachusetts	
Win	34–6–1	(United States) Stacy McSwain	UD	10	1985-12-14	(United States) Miami Beach Convention Center, Miami Beach, Florida	
Win	33–6–1	(United States) Billy Robertson	TD	7	1985-09-26	(United States) Marriott Hotel, Irvine, California	Fight stopped due to cuts caused by an accidental headbutt.
Win	32–6–1	(United States) Bert Lee	UD	10	1985-07-22	(United States) Marriott Hotel, Irvine, California	
Win	31–6–1	(United States) Ricky Burgess	TKO	1	1985-05-13	(United States) Spinoff Roller Disco, Boston, Massachusetts	Referee stopped the bout at 1:50 of the first round.
Win	30–6–1	(United States) Doug Kaluza	TKO	5	1985-03-16	(United States) Rensselaer Polytechnic Institute, Troy, New York	
Loss	29–6–1	(Jamaica) Mike McCallum	UD	15	1984-10-19	(United States) Madison Square Garden, New York City	WBA Light Middleweight Title.
Win	29–5–1	(United States) Roosevelt Green	KO	7	1984-02-17	(United States) Atlantic City, New Jersey	
Win	28–5–1	(United States) Danny "Thunderhand" Chapman	PTS	10	1983-08-11	(United States) Yarmouth, Massachusetts	
Win	27–5–1	(South Korea) In-Chul Baek	PTS	10	1983-05-19	(United States) Resorts Casino Hotel, Atlantic City, New Jersey	
Win	26–5–1	(United States) Dennis Horne	UD	10	1983-03-16	(United States) Atlantic City, New Jersey	
Win	25–5–1	(United States) Larry Byrd	KO	10	1983-02-27	(United States) Resorts Casino Hotel, Atlantic City, New Jersey	
Win	24–5–1	(United States) Bill "Fireball" Bradley	PTS	10	1982-12-09	(United States) Atlantic City, New Jersey	
Win	23–5–1	(United States) Rocky Fratto	UD	10	1982-10-07	(United States) The Sands, Atlantic City, New Jersey	
Loss	22–5–1	(United States) Steve Michalerya	PTS	10	1982-09-15	(United States) Catholic Youth Center, Scranton, Pennsylvania	
Win	22–4–1	(United States) Hector Figueroa	PTS	10	1982-08-20	(United States) Plymouth Memorial Hall, Plymouth, Massachusetts	
Win	21–4–1	(Argentina) Ricardo Raul Camoranesi	KO	7	1982-07-23	(United States) Cape Cod Coliseum, South Yarmouth, Massachusetts	
Loss	20–4–1	(United States) Gary Guiden	TKO	4	1982-05-04	(United States) Caesars Palace, Las Vegas, Nevada	IBF USBA Light Middleweight Title.
Win	20–3–1	(United States) Nino Gonzalez	PTS	10	1982-01-21	(United States) Ice World, Totowa, New Jersey	
Win	19–3–1	(United States) Tony "Akbar Muhammad" Taylor	PTS	8	1981-11-25	(United States) Freeport Hall, Dorchester, Massachusetts	
Draw	18–3–1	(United States) Hector Figueroa	PTS	10	1981-10-15	(United States) Springfield Civic Center, Springfield, Massachusetts	
Win	18–3	(United States) Robert Sawyer	SD	8	1981-05-07	(United States) Playboy Hotel and Casino, Atlantic City, New Jersey	
Win	17–3	(United States) Sterling Quick	UD	8	1981-04-24	(United States) Lowe's Theatre, Worcester, Massachusetts	
Win	16–3	(United States) Ralph Doucette	KO	3	1981-01-10	(United States) Stanislaus Hall, Nashua, New Hampshire	
Loss	15–3	(United States) Tony Suero	TKO	8	1980-09-18	(United States) Ice World, Totowa, New Jersey	
Win	15–2	(United States) Steve Snow	KO	5	1980-08-21	(United States) Ice World, Totowa, New Jersey	
Loss	14–2	(United States) Ruby Ortiz	PTS	10	1980-04-18	(United States) Felt Forum, New York City	
Win	14–1	(Canada) Lawrence Hafey	SD	10	1980-03-11	Halifax Metro Centre, Halifax, Nova Scotia, Canada	
Win	13–1	(United States) Patrick Maloney	TKO	7	1980-02-22	(United States) Bank Street Armory, Fall River, Massachusetts	Referee stopped the bout at 2:15 of the seventh round.
Win	12–1	(United States) Jimmy Corkum	TKO	6	1979-11-07	(United States) Boston, Massachusetts	
Win	11–1	(United States) Jaime Rodriguez	PTS	8	1979-05-19	(United States) Quincy, Massachusetts	
Win	10–1	(United States) Irving Booth	KO	2	1979-02-28	(United States) Belfast, Maine	
Win	9–1	(United States) Jaime Rodriguez	PTS	6	1979-02-24	(United States) Quincy, Massachusetts	
Win	8–1	(United States) Fernando "Frankie" Fernandez	PTS	6	1979-01-15	(United States) Freeport Hall, Dorchester, Massachusetts	
Win	7–1	(United States) Jesse Rogers	KO	6	1978-12-15	(United States) North Providence, Rhode Island	
Loss	6–1	(United States) Roger Leonard	UD	6	1978-12-09	(United States) Springfield Civic Center, Springfield, Massachusetts	
Win	6–0	(United States) Jose Ortiz	PTS	6	1978-11-11	(United States) Boston Garden, Boston, Massachusetts	
Win	5–0	(United States) Steve "Butterfly" Hughes	PTS	6	1978-11-03	(United States) Cumberland County Civic Center, Portland, Maine	
Win	4–0	(United States) Jose Ortiz	KO	5	1978-09-10	(United States) New Haven, Connecticut	
Win	3–0	(United States) Steve Coupe	PTS	6	1978-08-24	(United States) Boston Garden, Boston, Massachusetts	
Win	2–0	Tommy Pyke	KO	1	1978-07-10	(United States) Boston Garden, Boston, Massachusetts	
Win	1–0	(United States) Danny Perez	PTS	6	1978-06-28	(United States) Providence, Rhode Island	
