= Mike McCallum vs. Donald Curry =

Boxing match

Armed and Dangerous
- Date: July 18, 1987
- Venue: Caesars Palace, Paradise, Nevada, U.S.
- Title(s) on the line: WBA super welterweight title

Tale of the tape
Boxer	Mike McCallum	Donald Curry
Nickname	The Body Snatcher	The Lone Star Cobra
Hometown	Kingston Surrey County, Jamaica	Fort Worth, Texas, U.S.
Purse	$475,000	$425,000
Pre-fight record	31–0 (28 KO)	27–1 (19 KO)
Age	30 years, 7 months	25 years, 10 months
Height	5 ft 11 1/2 in (182 cm)	5 ft 10 1/2 in (179 cm)
Weight	154 lb (70 kg)	154 lb (70 kg)
Style	Orthodox	Orthodox
Recognition	WBA; Super Welterweight Champion; The Ring; No. 3 Ranked Middleweight	WBA; No. 1 Ranked Super Welterweight; The Ring; No. 7 Ranked Middleweight

Result
- McCallum wins via 5th-round knockout

Mike McCallum vs. Donald Curry, billed as Armed and Dangerous, was a professional boxing match contested on July 18, 1987 for the WBA super welterweight title.

== Background ==
Talks about a McCallum–Curry matchup had been ongoing for over two years. Curry, then the unified WBA and IBF welterweight, had mulled a full-time move to the super welterweight division in 1985, knocking out welterweight contenders James Green and Pablo Baez in March and June of that year respectively before returning to welterweight to face WBC welterweight champion Milton McCrory, whom he dispatched in the second round to become the undisputed welterweight champion. Following his defeat of McCrory, Curry was expected leave the welterweight division in favor of moving up to super welterweight and was offered an opportunity to face McCallum for the WBA super welterweight title on June 23, 1986, but after consulting with Sugar Ray Leonard and Leonard's attorney Mike Trainer, turned down the fight and instead opted to remain a welterweight. In lieu of facing McCallum, Curry instead defended his undisputed welterweight title against massive underdog Lloyd Honeyghan that September, but he was badly outboxed by Honeyghan, who scored the upset victory when a large gash above Curry's left eye forced him to retire on his stool after the sixth round. The loss set Curry back and temporarlily halted his plans to move up in weight to challenge top fighters such as McCallum, Thomas Hearns and Marvin Hagler.

After the Honeyghan fight, Curry left the welterweight division and officially moved up to super welterweight in 1987, winning his first two fights in the weight class by identical fifth-round disqualifications. In April of that year, McCallum had defeated former Curry foe McCrory and afterwards his manager Lou Duva revealed that he planned to schedule the long-awaited McCallum–Curry bout next. The following month, the fight was made official to take place on July 18.

In the months proceeding the fight, Curry had filed a $1,000,000 lawsuit against Leonard and Trainer claiming that the duo had advised him to remain in the welterweight division so Leonard could face Hagler without having to worry about Curry, who had planned to move up to middleweight and then fight Hagler himself. Leonard was working for HBO as color commentator was scheduled to call the McCallum–Curry bout opposite Barry Tompkins as part of their HBO World Championship Boxing program. However, Curry, citing his lawsuit against Leonard, insisted HBO remove Leonard from the telecast though HBO denied Curry's wishes and allowed Leonard to work the telecast.

== Fight Details ==
Curry controlled most of the fight and held a lead on all three of the judge's scorecards going into the fifth round. However, just past a minute into the round, Curry threw a right to McCallum's body that was countered with a left hook that caught Curry flush and sent him down on his back. Curry did not move until the count of seven, but was unable to get back to his feet as referee Richard Steele counted him out at 10.

== Fight card ==
Confirmed bouts:

Weight Class	Weight		vs.		Method	Round	Notes
Super Welterweight	154 lbs.	Mike McCallum (c)	def.	Donald Curry	KO	5/15	^{note 1}
Featherweight	126 lbs.	Jeff Franklin	def.	Adam Garcia	UD	10/10
Middleweight	160 lbs.	Dale Jackson	def.	Israel Cole	TKO	5/8
Super Flyweight	115 lbs.	Akeem Anifowoshe	def.	Jorge Lujan	TKO	3/6
Lightweight	135 lbs.	Leonard Washington	vs.	Tim Gallagher	D	4/4

^Note 1 For WBA Super Welterweight Titles

== Broadcasting ==
Country	Broadcaster
United States	HBO

Preceded by vs. Milton McCrory	Mike McCallum's bouts 18 July 1987	Succeeded by vs. Sumbu Kalambay
Preceded by vs. Carlos Santos	Donald Curry's bouts 18 July 1987	Succeeded by vs. Rigoberto Lopez
