= Michael Nunn vs. Sumbu Kalambay =

1989 boxing match in Nevada, US

Premier Battle
- Date: March 25, 1989
- Venue: Las Vegas Hilton, Paradise, Nevada, U.S.
- Title(s) on the line: IBF and The Ring middleweight titles

Tale of the tape
Boxer	Michael Nunn	Sumbu Kalambay
Nickname	Second to (Nunn)	Patrizio
Hometown	Davenport, Iowa, U.S.	Chiaravalle, Marche, Italy
Purse	$1,100,000	$400,000
Pre-fight record	32–0 (22 KO)	46–3–1 (26 KO)
Age	25 years, 11 months	32 years, 11 months
Height	6 ft 2 in (188 cm)	5 ft 9 in (175 cm)
Weight	160 lb (73 kg)	159 lb (72 kg)
Style	Southpaw	Orthodox
Recognition	IBF; Middleweight Champion; The Ring; No. 1 Ranked Middleweight	The Ring; Middleweight Champion; IBF; No. 1 Ranked Middleweight; Former WBA middleweight champion

Result
- Nunn wins via 1st-round KO

Michael Nunn vs. Sumbu Kalambay, billed as Premier Battle, was a professional boxing match contested on March 25, 1989, for the IBF middleweight title. The fight won The Ring magazine's inaugural knockout of the year award for 1989.

== Background ==
In January 1989, promoter Bob Arum of Top Rank announced his intentions to create a middleweight unification series in order to crown an undisputed middleweight champion. Arum's initial plans called for Michael Nunn, the IBF middleweight champion, to face WBA middleweight champion Sumbu Kalambay in a unification bout that March and then move on to face the winner of the Iran Barkley–Roberto Durán fight that would take place one month before the Nunn–Kalambay fight for Barkley's WBC middleweight champion. These plans were derailed almost immediately when the WBA refused to sanction the Nunn–Kalambay fight, instead mandating that Kalambay face their number-one ranked contender Herol Graham, though Kalambay decided to go through with facing Nunn leading to the WBA to strip him of their title. Angered by the WBA's decision, Arum criticized the organization, stating that the WBA was "extorting sanctioning fees" and acting "unlawfully" by stripping Kalambay. At the insistence of Arum, Kalambay was still introduced as the WBA middleweight champion by announcer Michael Buffer during the pre-fight introductions. Kalambay, not largely known in the United States and seven years older than Nunn, was installed as a 4–1 underdog by oddsmakers.

== The fight ==
The fight would last just over one minute. The two fighters started the fight trying to establish their jabs, though the taller Nunn was having much more success than Kalambay. Than with seventy seconds having gone by, Kalambay threw a jab that missed Nunn, who countered with a big left hand that caught Kalambay flush and sent him down on his back. Kalambay hardly made an attempt to get back up as he was counted out by the referee, giving Nunn the knockout victory after only 1:28 of action.

== Fight card ==
Confirmed bouts:

Weight Class	Weight		vs.		Method	Round	Notes
Middleweight	160 lbs.	Michael Nunn (c)	def	Sumbu Kalambay	KO	1/12	^{Note 1}
Cruiserweight	190 lbs.	Yawe Davis	def	Randy Leaks	UD	6/6
Middleweight	160 lbs.	Dan Sherry	def.	Scott Sharp	UD	6/6
Cruiserweight	190 lbs.	Al Cole	def.	Lorenzo Thomas	TKO	3/4
Super Lightweight	140 lbs.	Charles Murray	def	Benjamin Quintero	TKO	2/4
Super Bantamweight	122 lbs.	Kennedy McKinney	def.	Charles Hawkins	TKO	1/4
Light Heavyweight	175 lbs.	Andrew Maynard	def.	Rodney Brown	TKO	2/4
Super Welterweight	154 lbs.	Robert Wangila	def.	Louis Saucedo	UD	4/4

^Note 1 For IBF middleweight title

== Broadcasting ==
Country	Broadcaster
United States	HBO
Thailand	Channel 7

Preceded by vs. Juan Roldán	Michael Nunn's bouts 25 March 1989	Succeeded by vs. Iran Barkley
Preceded by vs. Doug DeWitt	Sumbu Kalambay's bouts 25 March 1989	Succeeded by vs. Tony Powell
Awards
New award	The Ring Knockout of the Year; 1989	Next: John Mugabi vs. Terry Norris
Preceded by Thomas Hearns vs. Iran Barkley	KO Magazine Knockout of the Year; 1989	Next: Michael Dokes vs. Donovan Ruddock
