= Masashi Kudo =

Masashi Kudo may refer to:

- Masashi Kudo (animator) (工藤 昌史), Japanese animator
- Masashi Kudo (boxer) (工藤 政志, born 1951), Japanese boxer
