= Mike McCallum =

Jamaican boxer (1956–2025)

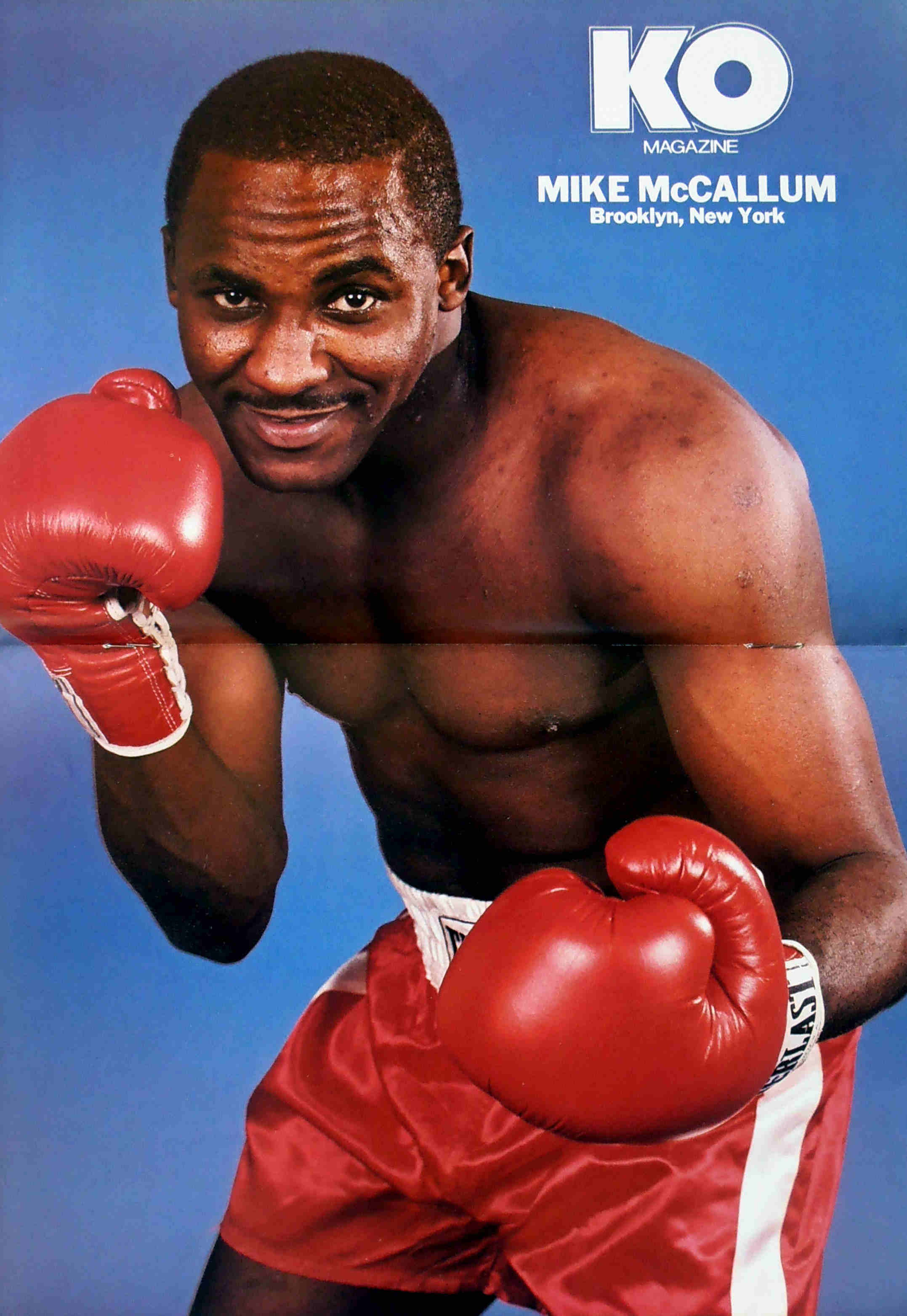
- McCallum c. 1988

Personal information
- Nickname: The Bodysnatcher
- Born: Michael McKenzie McCallum; 7 December 1956 Kingston, Jamaica
- Died: 31 May 2025 (aged 68) Las Vegas, Nevada, U.S.
- Height: 5 ft 11 1/2 in (182 cm)
- Weight: Light middleweight; Middleweight; Light heavyweight; Cruiserweight

Boxing career
- Reach: 78 in (198 cm)
- Stance: Orthodox

Boxing record
- Total fights: 55
- Wins: 49
- Win by KO: 36
- Losses: 5
- Draws: 1
Medal record
Men's amateur boxing
Representing Jamaica
Commonwealth Games
Gold medal – first place	1978 Edmonton	Welterweight
Pan American Games
Silver medal – second place	1979 San Juan	Welterweight
Central American and Caribbean Games
Gold medal – first place	1978 Medellín	Welterweight
Silver medal – second place	1974 Santo Domingo	Welterweight

Michael McKenzie McCallum (7 December 1956 – 31 May 2025) was a Jamaican professional boxer who competed from 1981 to 1997. He held world championships in three weight classes, including the World Boxing Association (WBA) super welterweight title from 1984 to 1988, the WBA middleweight title from 1989 to 1991, and the World Boxing Council (WBC) light heavyweight title from 1994 to 1995.

A slick, hard-hitting technician in the ring, McCallum was known for his exceptionally durable chin and toughness, and was never stopped in any of his five losses. He earned his nickname of "The Bodysnatcher" due to his ability to land vicious body punches in fights. McCallum was inducted into the International Boxing Hall of Fame in 2003. In 2011, The Ring magazine ranked him as eighth on their list of the "10 best middleweight title holders of the last 50 years."

McCallum died in Las Vegas on 31 May 2025, at the age of 68.

== Amateur career ==
Claimed an amateur record of 240–10

- 1974 – Competed as a welterweight in the World Championships in Havana, losing by a 3rd-round TKO to Clint Jackson of the United States.
- 1974 – Won welterweight silver medal at the 1974 Central American and Caribbean Games.
- 1975 – Represented Jamaica at the 1975 Pan American Games in Mexico City.
- 1976 – Represented Jamaica as a welterweight at Montreal Olympic Games. Results were:
  - Defeated Damdinjavyn Bandi (Mongolia) points
  - Defeated Robert Dauer (Australia) points
  - Lost to Reinhard Skricek (West Germany) points
- 1977 – National AAU Welterweight Champion, defeating Marlon Starling in semifinals and Roger Leonard of the Air Force in the final.
- 1977 – National Golden Gloves Welterweight Champion
- 1978 – Won welterweight gold medal at the 1978 Central American and Caribbean Games.
- 1978 – Welterweight Gold Medalist at Commonwealth Games in Edmonton, Canada.
- 1978 – Won welterweight gold medal at the 1978 Central American and Caribbean Games.
- 1979 – National Golden Gloves Welterweight Champion, defeating Doug DeWitt and Robbie Sims.
- 1979 – Welterweight Silver Medalist at Pan-American Games in San Juan, Puerto Rico. Results were:
  - Defeated Claudio Pereira (Brazil)
  - Defeated Edward Green (United States) TKO 2
  - Defeated Javier Colin (Mexico) TKO
  - Lost to Andrés Aldama (Cuba) KO by 2
- 1979 – National Golden Gloves Welterweight Champion.
- 1980 – Lost to Alex Ramos in New York Golden Gloves.

== Professional career ==
=== Light middleweight ===
Mike McCallum turned professional in 1981. As a professional, he fought almost exclusively in the USA. He first became a world champion in 1984 by defeating Sean Mannion to win the vacant WBA super welterweight title. McCallum would defend that title six times, winning all six fights by knockout.

His first prominent opponent was future two-weight world champion and future fellow International Boxing Hall of Fame member Julian Jackson, whom McCallum fought in his third title defense. McCallum survived some punishment in the first round and came back to stop the undefeated Jackson in the second round.

McCallum really came to prominence when he knocked out former WBC welterweight title-holder Milton McCrory and former undisputed world welterweight champion, another future International Boxing Hall of Fame member, Donald Curry in 1987. Curry was ahead on all three scorecards going into the fifth round when McCallum knocked him out with what some have called a "perfect" left hook.

=== Middleweight ===
In 1988, he moved up to middleweight, suffering his first defeat, a clear unanimous decision, in an attempt to win the WBA middleweight championship from Sumbu Kalambay. In 1989, McCallum defeated Herol Graham by a split decision to win the then-vacant WBA middleweight title (which had been stripped from Kalambay for signing to face IBF champion Michael Nunn). He defended the title three times, defeating Steve Collins, Michael Watson, and Kalambay in a rematch.

McCallum fought IBF middleweight champion James Toney in 1991. McCallum was stripped of the WBA title before the bout. The fight ended in a draw, and McCallum lost the second fight by a controversial majority decision the following year. Some felt that McCallum had won both fights.

=== Light heavyweight ===
McCallum then moved up two weight divisions and won the WBC interim light heavyweight title against Randall Yonker, then won the full WBC title by outpointing Jeff Harding in 1994. Being in his late thirties, he did not hold the crown long, losing the title to Fabrice Tiozzo. At 40 years of age, he attempted to regain the vacant Interim WBC title against Roy Jones Jr. in December 1996, but lost by a wide decision.

In his last fight, McCallum lost a rubber match to James Toney via a unanimous decision in a cruiserweight bout.

McCallum had a professional record of 49–5–1 (36 knockouts). He was never knocked out as a professional. After McCallum retired, he moved to Las Vegas and became a trainer. He was inducted into the International Boxing Hall of Fame in 2003.

== Professional boxing record ==
55 fights	49 wins	5 losses
By knockout	36	0
By decision	13	5
Draws	1	

No.	Result	Record	Opponent	Type	Round, time	Date	Location	Notes
55	Loss	49–5–1	James Toney	UD	12	22 Feb 1997	Mohegan Sun Arena, Montville, Connecticut, US	For vacant WBU cruiserweight title
54	Loss	49–4–1	Roy Jones Jr.	UD	12	22 Nov 1996	Ice Palace, Tampa, Florida, US	For vacant WBC interim light heavyweight title
53	Win	49–3–1	Ali Saidi	UD	10	22 Jun 1996	Westfalenstadion, Dortmund, Germany	
52	Loss	48–3–1	Fabrice Tiozzo	UD	12	16 Jun 1995	Palais des Sports de Gerland, Lyon, France	Lost WBC light heavyweight title
51	Win	48–2–1	Carl Jones	TKO	7 (12), 1:17	25 Feb 1995	London Arena, London, England	Retained WBC light heavyweight title
50	Win	47–2–1	Jeff Harding	UD	12	23 Jul 1994	Civic Center, Bismarck, North Dakota, US	Won WBC light heavyweight title
49	Win	46–2–1	Randall Yonker	TKO	5 (12), 2:55	4 Mar 1994	MGM Grand Garden Arena, Paradise, Nevada, US	Won vacant WBC interim light heavyweight title
48	Win	45–2–1	Glenn Thomas	PTS	10	14 Aug 1993	Labatt's Apollo, London, England	
47	Win	44–2–1	Ramzi Hassan	UD	10	25 Mar 1993	Amiens, France	
46	Loss	43–2–1	James Toney	MD	12	29 Aug 1992	Convention Center, Reno, Nevada, US	For IBF middleweight title
45	Win	43–1–1	Fermin Chirino	UD	10	21 May 1992	Bally's Las Vegas, Paradise, Nevada, US	
44	Draw	42–1–1	James Toney	SD	12	13 Dec 1991	Convention Hall, Atlantic City, New Jersey, US	For IBF middleweight title
43	Win	42–1	Nicky Walker	RTD	5 (10), 3:00	10 Oct 1991	Bally's Las Vegas, Paradise, Nevada, US	
42	Win	41–1	Carlos Cruzat	UD	10	29 Aug 1991	Eldorado Resort Casino, Reno, Nevada, US	
41	Win	40–1	Sumbu Kalambay	SD	12	1 Apr 1991	Stade Louis II, Fontvieille, Monaco	Retained WBA middleweight title
40	Win	39–1	Frank Minton	TKO	4 (10), 1:21	19 Feb 1991	Kemper Arena, Kansas City, Missouri, US	
39	Win	38–1	Michael Watson	KO	11 (12), 2:22	14 Apr 1990	Royal Albert Hall, London, England	Retained WBA middleweight title
38	Win	37–1	Steve Collins	UD	12	3 Feb 1990	Hynes Convention Center, Boston, Massachusetts, US	Retained WBA middleweight title
37	Win	36–1	Herol Graham	SD	12	10 May 1989	Royal Albert Hall, London, England	Won vacant WBA middleweight title
36	Win	35–1	Ralph Moncrief	TKO	5	9 Jan 1989	Nogent-le-Phaye, France	
35	Win	34–1	Randy Smith	UD	10	22 Dec 1988	Vincennes, France	
34	Win	33–1	David McCluskey	TKO	2 (10), 2:24	27 Jun 1988	Madison Square Garden, New York City, New York, US	
33	Loss	32–1	Sumbu Kalambay	UD	12	5 Mar 1988	Palazzo dello Sport, Pesaro, Italy	For WBA middleweight title
32	Win	32–0	Donald Curry	KO	5 (15), 1:14	18 Jul 1987	Caesars Palace, Paradise, Nevada, US	Retained WBA super welterweight title
31	Win	31–0	Milton McCrory	TKO	10 (15), 2:20	19 Apr 1987	Pointe Resort, Phoenix, Arizona, US	Retained WBA super welterweight title
30	Win	30–0	Leroy Hester	KO	1 (10), 1:30	21 Mar 1987	National Arena, Kingston, Jamaica	
29	Win	29–0	Said Skouma	TKO	9 (15), 2:25	25 Oct 1986	Le Zénith, Paris, France	Retained WBA super welterweight title
28	Win	28–0	Irving Hines	TKO	4 (10)	15 Sep 1986	Paris, France	
27	Win	27–0	Julian Jackson	TKO	2 (15), 2:03	23 Aug 1986	Convention Center, Miami Beach, Florida, US	Retained WBA super welterweight title
26	Win	26–0	Jimmy Shavers	TKO	6	2 May 1986	Atlantic City, New Jersey, US	
25	Win	25–0	David Braxton	TKO	8 (15), 2:26	28 Jul 1985	Tamiami Park Auditorium, Miami, Florida, US	Retained WBA super welterweight title
24	Win	24–0	Marcos Martinez	TKO	2 (10)	15 Jun 1985	Riviera, Winchester, Nevada, US	
23	Win	23–0	Luigi Minchillo	TKO	13 (15)	1 Dec 1984	Palasport di San Siro, Milan, Italy	Retained WBA super welterweight title
22	Win	22–0	Sean Mannion	UD	15	19 Oct 1984	Madison Square Garden, New York City, New York, US	Won vacant WBA super welterweight title
21	Win	21–0	Hasim Razzaq	KO	1 (10), 0:48	10 Mar 1984	Cobo Hall, Detroit, Michigan, US	
20	Win	20–0	Manuel Jiminez	UD	10	25 Oct 1983	Playboy Hotel and Casino, Atlantic City, New Jersey, US	
19	Win	19–0	Jose Vallejo	TKO	6 (10)	31 Aug 1983	Sands, Atlantic City, New Jersey, US	
18	Win	18–0	Tony Suero	TKO	3 (10)	26 Apr 1983	Tropicana, Atlantic City, New Jersey, US	
17	Win	17–0	Ayub Kalule	RTD	7 (10), 3:00	13 Nov 1982	Sands, Atlantic City, New Jersey, US	
16	Win	16–0	Carlos Betancourt	TKO	3 (10)	22 Oct 1982	Felt Forum, New York City, New York, US	
15	Win	15–0	Kevin Perry	UD	10	11 Jun 1982	Madison Square Garden, New York City, New York, US	
14	Win	14–0	Reggie Ford	TKO	4 (10)	30 Apr 1982	Felt Forum, New York City, New York, US	
13	Win	13–0	Gilberto Almonte	KO	1 (10), 1:06	26 Mar 1982	Hotel, Kingston, Jamaica	
12	Win	12–0	Greg Young	TKO	5 (10), 0:29	22 Jan 1982	Felt Forum, New York City, New York, US	
11	Win	11–0	Jimmy Heair	TKO	2 (10)	8 Oct 1981	Curtis Hixon Hall, Tampa, Florida, US	
10	Win	10–0	Ed Harris	KO	1 (8)	8 Sep 1981	Curtis Hixon Hall, Tampa, Florida, US	
9	Win	9–0	Tirso Roque	KO	3 (8)	27 Aug 1981	Curtis Hixon Hall, Tampa, Florida, US	
8	Win	8–0	Bruce Strauss	TKO	3	19 Jul 1981	Packard Music Hall, Warren, Ohio, US	
7	Win	7–0	Freddie Creech	KO	3	10 Jun 1981	Tampa, Florida, US	
6	Win	6–0	Charles Smith	KO	3	30 Apr 1981	Curtis Hixon Hall, Tampa, Florida, US	
5	Win	5–0	Danny Chapman	TKO	4 (4), 2:09	24 Apr 1981	Felt Forum, New York City, New York, US	
4	Win	4–0	Shelby Wilkerson	KO	5	2 Apr 1981	Tampa, Florida, US	
3	Win	3–0	Ricky Sheppard	KO	5	19 Mar 1981	Curtis Hixon Hall, Tampa, Florida, US	
2	Win	2–0	Rocky Fabrizio	KO	1	3 Mar 1981	Tampa, Florida, US	
1	Win	1–0	Rigoberto Lopez	KO	4 (6)	14 Jan 1981	Silver Slipper, Paradise, Nevada, US	

== Titles in boxing ==
=== Major world titles ===
- WBA light middleweight champion (154 lbs)
- WBA middleweight champion (160 lbs)
- WBC light heavyweight champion (175 lbs)

=== Interim world titles ===
- WBC interim light heavyweight champion (175 lbs)

== See also ==
- List of boxing triple champions
- List of world light-middleweight boxing champions
- List of world middleweight boxing champions
- List of world light-heavyweight boxing champions

Sporting positions
Amateur boxing titles
Previous: Clinton Jackson	U.S. Golden Gloves welterweight champion 1977	Next: Jeff Stoudemire
Previous: Clinton Jackson	U.S. welterweight champion 1977	Next: Roger Leonard
Previous: Jeff Stoudemire	U.S. Golden Gloves welterweight champion 1979	Next: Donald Curry
World boxing titles
Vacant Title last held by Roberto Durán	WBA super welterweight champion 19 October 1984 – August 1987; Vacated	Vacant Title next held by Julian Jackson
Vacant Title last held by Sumbu Kalambay	WBA middleweight champion 10 May 1989 – 4 December 1991; Stripped	Vacant Title next held by Reggie Johnson
New title	WBC light heavyweight champion Interim title 4 March 1994 – 23 July 1994; Won full title	Vacant Title next held by Roy Jones Jr.
Preceded by Jeff Harding	WBC light heavyweight champion 23 July 1994 – 16 June 1995	Succeeded by Fabrice Tiozzo
Middleweight status
Preceded by Marvelous Marvin Hagler	Latest born world champion to die May 31, 2025 – October 14, 2026	Succeeded by Jorge Castro
