= John Mugabi vs. Terry Norris =

Boxing match

The Beast Returns
- Date: March 31, 1990
- Venue: USF Sun Dome, Tampa, Florida, U.S.
- Title(s) on the line: WBC Light middleweight title

Tale of the tape
| Boxer | John Mugabi | Terry Norris |
| Nickname | The Beast | Terrible |
| Hometown | Kampala, Uganda | Lubbock, Texas, U.S. |
| Purse | $150,000 | $30,000 |
| Pre-fight record | 36–2 (36 KO) | 24–3 (14 KO) |
| Age | 30 years | 22 years, 9 months |
| Height | 5 ft 8 1/2 in (174 cm) | 5 ft 9 in (175 cm) |
| Weight | 154 lb (70 kg) | 154 lb (70 kg) |
| Style | Orthodox | Orthodox |
| Recognition | WBC; Light Middleweight Champion; The Ring; No. 2 Ranked Light Middleweight | WBC/The Ring; No. 5 Ranked Light Middleweight; NABF light middleweight champion |

Result
- Norris wins via 1st-round knockout

John Mugabi vs. Terry Norris, billed as The Beast Returns, was a professional boxing match contested on March 31, 1990, for the WBC super welterweight world title.

== Background ==
In his third title opportunity after losing his previous two title fights to Marvin Hagler and Duane Thomas in 1986, John Mugabi had defeated reigning WBC super welterweight champion René Jacquot on July 9, 1989 by first-round technical knockout after Jacquot had injured his ankle following a knockdown earlier in the round. Mugabi, who at the time was considered one of boxing's most fearsome fighters and sported a 100% knockout rate, had issues finding an opponent and fought two non-title bouts in October 1989 and January 1990 before finally reaching an agreement to defend his title against 22-year old contender Terry Norris, the WBC's number-five ranked super welterweight, in his adopted hometown of Tampa, Florida on March 31, 1990. Hoping for a more lucrative fight, Mugabi's promoter had issued multi-million dollar offers to Michael Nunn, Thomas Hearns and Sugar Ray Leonard but all three fighters declined Huff's offer, forcing Mugabi to meet Norris in a far less lucrative fight in which Mugabi was scheduled to earn $150,000 and Norris only $30,000. Huff opinioned "It really didn't matter how much money I offered, however, because these people are deathly scared to fight Mugabi under any circumstances."

== Fight Details ==
Less than a minute into the first round, Mugabi was heavily stunned by a left hook. The blow put Mugabi on wobblily knees and Norris quickly followed up with combination that sent Mugabi down on his back. Mugabi answered the 10-count at eight but was still dazed as he staggered into referee Eddie Eckert but was allowed to continue. Upon the fight resuming, Norris closed in on Mugabi, but Mugabi was able to clinch Norris several times as he tried to get his legs back under him. After a minute and a half of weathering Norris' attack, Mugabi had seemingly recovered enough and decided to abandon his defensive approach and opted to trade punches with Norris. With 25 seconds remaining in the round, Mugabi went to throw a left but Norris connected flush with a right hand that sent Mugabi down face first on the canvas. Mugabi did not attempt to get back up until Eckert reached eight and was counted out, giving Norris the knockout victory at 2:47 of the round.

== Fight card ==
Confirmed bouts:

| Weight Class | Weight | | vs. | | Method | Round | Notes |
|---|---|---|---|---|---|---|---|
| Super Welterweight | 154 lbs. | Terry Norris | def. | John Mugabi (c) | KO | 1/12 | ^{note 1} |
| Middleweight | 160 lbs. | Willie Monroe | def. | Ricky Stackhouse | TKO | 6/10 |
| Heavyweight | 200+ lbs. | Jesse Ferguson | def. | Terry Armstrong | TKO | 6/10 |
| Light Heavyweight | 175 lbs. | Ron Essett | def. | Phil Lewis | TKO | 1/6 |
| Super Middleweight | 168 lbs. | Gerald Coleman | def. | Ron Foreman | TKO | 1/4 |

^Note 1 For WBC Super Welterweight Title

== Broadcasting ==
| Country | Broadcaster |
|---|---|
| United Kingdom | British Eurosport |
| United States | ABC |

| Preceded by vs. Carlos Antunes | John Mugabi's bouts 31 March 1990 | Succeeded by vs. James Williamson |
| Preceded by vs. Tony Montgomery | Terry Norris's bouts 31 March 1990 | Succeeded by vs. Rene Jacquot |
Awards
| Preceded by Michael Nunn vs. Sumbu Kalambay | The Ring Knockout of the Year; 1990 | Next: Akinobu Hiranaka vs. Morris East; Welcome Ncita vs. Kennedy McKinney |
