= James Toney vs. Mike McCallum II =

Boxing match

Once Is Not Enough
- Date: August 29, 1992
- Venue: Reno-Sparks Convention Center, Reno, Nevada, U.S.
- Title(s) on the line: IBF middleweight title

Tale of the tape
Boxer	James Toney	Mike McCallum
Nickname	Lights Out	The Body Snatcher
Hometown	Ann Arbor, Michigan, U.S.	Kingston, Jamaica
Purse	$700,000	$500,000
Pre-fight record	31–0–2 (21 KO)	43–1–1 (34 KO)
Age	24 years	35 years, 8 months
Height	5 ft 9 in (175 cm)	5 ft 11 1/2 in (182 cm)
Weight	158 3/4 lb (72 kg)	158 lb (72 kg)
Style	Orthodox	Orthodox
Recognition	IBF; Middleweight Champion; The Ring; No. 2 Ranked Middleweight; The Ring No. 10 ranked pound-for-pound fighter	IBF; No. 1 Ranked Middleweight; The Ring; No. 3 Ranked Middleweight; 2-division World Champion

Result
- Toney wins by majority decision (117–110, 117–110, 114–114)

James Toney vs. Mike McCallum II, billed as Once Is Not Enough, was a professional boxing match contested on August 29, 1992, for the IBF middleweight title.

== Background ==
Toney and McCallum had previously met the previous December, fighting to a split draw. Given the indecisiveness of the decision, talks of a rematch happened immediately afterwards during the post-fight press conference with McCallum stating "I'd love to do it again, it wasn't nothing but fun". A rematch was not agreed to for the time being however, and Toney instead went on to make his next defense against Dave Tiberi in February 1992, being declared the winner by a highly disputed split decision despite Tiberi seemingly dominating the fight. Toney would then make another successful defense against Glenn Wolfe in April on the undercard of the George Foreman–Alex Stewart fight, while McCallum would have one tune-up fight between his two fights against Toney, defeating journeyman Fermin Chirino by unanimous decision in May. Following Toney winning a non-title tune-up against Ricky Stackhouse, the Toney–McCallum rematch was set to take place on August 29, 1992. Prior to the fight, Toney and his team, trying to get in the almost 36-year old McCallum's head, presented McCallum a rocking chair inscribed with "Happy Retirement, Mike" at a press conference and the two fighter nearly came to blows at another press conference after Toney suddenly jumped up from his chair and challenged McCallum.

== The fight ==
Toney would win the fight by majority decision. For the second straight fight, one judge scored the fight even at 114–114, though the other two judges had Toney the winner with lopsided scores of 117–110. McCallum actually out-landed Toney by 100 punches, scoring 332 of his 849 thrown punches compared to Toney who landed 232 of 714 punches, though Toney was able to land the harder punches throughout the fight.

== Fight card ==
Confirmed bouts:

Weight Class	Weight		vs.		Method	Round	Notes
Middleweight	160 lbs.	James Toney	def.	Mike McCallum	MD	12/12	^{Note 1}
Lightweight	135 lbs.	Freddie Pendleton	vs.	Tracy Spann	D	2/12	^{Note 2}
Super Welterweight	154 lbs.	Peter Venancio	def.	Lonny Beasley	D	10/10
Featherweight	126 lbs.	Eddie Croft	def.	Magdaleno Maldonado	UD	6/6
Super Welterweight	154 lbs.	Clayton Williams	def.	Rick Dunn	UD	4/4

^Note 1 For IBF middleweight title
^Note 2 For vacant IBF lightweight title

== Broadcasting ==
Country	Broadcaster
United States	HBO

Preceded by vs. Ricky Stackhouse	James Toney's bouts 29 August 1992	Succeeded by vs. Doug DeWitt
Preceded by vs. Fermin Chirino	Mike McCallum's bouts 29 August 1992	Succeeded by vs. Ramzi Hassan
