= Ayub Kalule =

Ugandan boxer (born 1954)

Personal information
- Nickname: Gentleman
- Nationality: Ugandan
- Born: 6 January 1954 (age 72) Kampala, Protectorate of Uganda
- Height: 5 ft 9 in (175 cm)
- Weight: Light middleweight; Middleweight

Boxing career
- Reach: 73 in (185 cm)
- Stance: Southpaw

Boxing record
- Total fights: 50
- Wins: 46
- Win by KO: 23
- Losses: 4
Medal record
Men's Boxing
Representing Uganda
World Amateur Championships
Gold medal – first place	1974 Havana	Light Welterweight
Commonwealth Games
Gold medal – first place	1974 Christchurch	Lightweight

Ayub Kalule (born 6 January 1954) is a retired boxer from Uganda, who first came to prominence when he won the Amateur World Welterweight Title at the inaugural 1974 World Championships in Havana, Cuba. As a professional, he held the WBA and The Ring light middleweight titles from 1979 until 1981.

== Boxing career ==
Born in Kampala, he began his professional boxing career in 1976 when he won a four-round decision over Kurt Hombach in Copenhagen, Denmark. Kalule would be based out of Denmark for the rest of his career. He then won 29 more victories, achieving 30 wins, 0 losses. Included in those victories were defeats of Alipata Korovou for the Commonwealth Middleweight Title and a 10-round decision of former U.S. olympic gold medalist Sugar Ray Seales.

On 24 October 1979, Kalule was in Akita, Japan to take on Masashi Kudo for the Lineal and WBA Junior middleweight titles. Kalule easily outboxed the champion and thus captured the coveted world championship crown. He then successfully defended the title four times before taking on the legendary Sugar Ray Leonard on 25 June 1981 in the Houston Astrodome. A virtual unknown in the United States, Kalule was considered little more than a courier waiting to deliver the belt to Leonard. The fight proved much more difficult for Leonard as Kalule repeatedly landed straight lefts and fought on an almost even ground for the first five or six rounds. Slowly Leonard started to take control and in the 9th round ended the fight and Kalule's reign as WBA Champion.

Kalule fought on until the beginning of 1986 and managed to win the European Middleweight Title and defend it successfully against future world champion Sumbu Kalambay. Prior to that, he received another shot at the WBA Jr Middleweight Title held at that time by Davey Moore. Kalule put up a very good fight, but again was KO'd, this time in the 10th round. Ayub's career ended on 5 February 1986 when he lost the European Middleweight Title to Herol Graham. He finished his career with a very impressive record of 46–4 with 23 KOs.

== Professional boxing record ==
50 fights	46 wins	4 losses
By knockout	23	4
By decision	23	0

No.	Result	Record	Opponent	Type	Round, time	Date	Location	Notes
50	Loss	46–4	Herol Graham	TKO	10 (12), 2:10	Feb 5, 1986	City Hall, Sheffield, Yorkshire, England, UK	Lost European middleweight title
49	Win	46–3	Sumbu Kalambay	SD	12	Dec 19, 1985	Palazzo dello Sport, Ancona, Italy	Retained European middleweight title
48	Win	45–3	Pierre Joly	TKO	8 (12)	Jun 20, 1985	Idraetshuset, Copenhagen, Denmark	Won vacant European middleweight title
47	Win	44–3	Mauro Fernandes da Cruz	TKO	4 (8)	Mar 9, 1985	K.B. Hallen, Copenhagen, Denmark	
46	Win	43–3	Lindell Holmes	PTS	8	Nov 9, 1984	K.B. Hallen, Copenhagen, Denmark	
45	Win	42–3	Wayne Caplette	TKO	3 (8)	Oct 5, 1984	Randers Hallen, Randers, Denmark	
44	Win	41–3	Jimmy Price	TKO	1 (10)	Apr 25, 1984	Alexandra Pavilion, Muswell Hill, London, England, UK	
43	Loss	40–3	Mike McCallum	RTD	7 (10), 3:00	Nov 13, 1982	Sands Casino Hotel, Atlantic City, New Jersey, US	
42	Loss	40–2	Davey Moore	TKO	10 (15), 2:58	Jul 17, 1982	Ballys Park Place Hotel Casino, Atlantic City, New Jersey, US	For WBA junior-middleweight title
41	Win	40–1	Oscar Albarado	TKO	2 (10)	Apr 30, 1982	Brondby Hallen, Brondby, Denmark	
40	Win	39–1	Jacques Chinon	PTS	10	Feb 26, 1982	K.B. Hallen, Copenhagen, Denmark	
39	Win	38–1	O'Dell Leonard	PTS	8	Nov 13, 1981	Randers Hallen, Randers, Denmark	
38	Win	37–1	Andoni Amana	PTS	10	Oct 9, 1981	K.B. Hallen, Copenhagen, Denmark	
37	Loss	36–1	Sugar Ray Leonard	KO	9 (15), 3:06	Jun 25, 1981	Astrodome, Houston, Texas, US	Lost WBA and The Ring junior-middleweight titles
36	Win	36–0	Pat Hallacy	PTS	10	Mar 5, 1981	Brondby Hallen, Brondby, Denmark	
35	Win	35–0	Bushy Bester	UD	15	Sep 6, 1980	Aarhus Stadion, Aarhus, Denmark	Retained WBA and The Ring junior-middleweight titles
34	Win	34–0	Marijan Beneš	UD	15	Jun 12, 1980	Randers Hallen, Randers, Denmark	Retained WBA and The Ring junior-middleweight titles
33	Win	33–0	Emiliano Villa	RTD	11 (15), 3:00	Apr 17, 1980	Brondby Hallen, Brondby, Denmark	Retained WBA and The Ring junior-middleweight titles
32	Win	32–0	Steve Gregory	UD	15	Dec 6, 1979	Brondby Hallen, Brondby, Denmark	Retained WBA and The Ring junior-middleweight titles
31	Win	31–0	Masashi Kudo	UD	15	Oct 24, 1979	City Gymnasium, Akita City, Japan	Won WBA and The Ring junior-middleweight titles
30	Win	30–0	David Love	PTS	10	Sep 6, 1979	Randers Hallen, Randers, Denmark	
29	Win	29–0	Ray Hammond	PTS	8	Jun 28, 1979	Randers Hallen, Randers, Denmark	
28	Win	28–0	Obdulio Rogelio Zarza	PTS	10	May 27, 1979	Randers Hallen, Randers, Denmark	
27	Win	27–0	Monty Betham	TKO	4 (10)	Mar 15, 1979	Brondby Hallen, Brondby, Denmark	
26	Win	26–0	Ho Joo	KO	2 (10)	Feb 15, 1979	Randers Hallen, Randers, Denmark	
25	Win	25–0	Kevin Finnegan	UD	10	Dec 7, 1978	Idraetshuset, Copenhagen, Denmark	
24	Win	24–0	Sugar Ray Seales	MD	10	Nov 9, 1978	Brondby Hallen, Brondby, Denmark	
23	Win	23–0	Reggie Ford	KO	5 (15)	Sep 14, 1978	Randers Hallen, Randers, Denmark	Retained Commonwealth middleweight title
22	Win	22–0	Milton Owens	TKO	6 (10), 1:00	Aug 10, 1978	Glyngoere Hallen, Glyngoere, Denmark	
21	Win	21–0	Al Korovou	TKO	14 (15), 1:00	May 25, 1978	Brondby Hallen, Brondby, Denmark	Won Commonwealth middleweight title
20	Win	20–0	Idrissa Konate	TKO	7 (12)	Apr 27, 1978	Randers Hallen, Randers, Denmark	
19	Win	19–0	Tsutomu Hagusa	TKO	3 (10)	Mar 16, 1978	Idraetshuset, Copenhagen, Denmark	
18	Win	18–0	Johnny Baldwin	PTS	10	Mar 2, 1978	Vejle, Denmark	
17	Win	17–0	Jose Hernandez	TKO	5 (10)	Feb 9, 1978	Idraetshuset, Copenhagen, Denmark	
16	Win	16–0	Rennie Pinder	PTS	8	Jan 26, 1978	Chateau Neuf, Oslo, Norway	
15	Win	15–0	Bonifacio Ávila	TKO	4 (10)	Jan 5, 1978	Randers Hallen, Randers, Denmark	
14	Win	14–0	Ralph Palladin	PTS	10	Dec 8, 1977	Idraetshuset, Copenhagen, Denmark	
13	Win	13–0	Miguel Ángel Castellini	TKO	3 (10)	Nov 3, 1977	Randers Hallen, Randers, Denmark	
12	Win	12–0	Alvin Anderson	TKO	9 (10)	Oct 6, 1977	Idraetshuset, Copenhagen, Denmark	
11	Win	11–0	Rudy Robles	PTS	10	Sep 8, 1977	Idraetshuset, Copenhagen, Denmark	
10	Win	10–0	Elisha Obed	PTS	10	Jun 2, 1977	Randers Hallen, Randers, Denmark	
9	Win	9–0	Jose Duran	TKO	7 (10)	Apr 28, 1977	Idraetshuset, Copenhagen, Denmark	
8	Win	8–0	Aroldo Olivares	TKO	6 (10)	Mar 31, 1977	Idraetshuset, Copenhagen, Denmark	
7	Win	7–0	Mimoun Mohatar	PTS	10	Feb 24, 1977	Idraetshuset, Copenhagen, Denmark	
6	Win	6–0	Damiano Lassandro	TKO	3 (10)	Jan 20, 1977	Idraetshuset, Copenhagen, Denmark	
5	Win	5–0	Larry Paul	KO	2 (10)	Dec 9, 1976	Idraetshuset, Copenhagen, Denmark	
4	Win	4–0	Gualberto Fernandez	KO	1 (6)	Nov 19, 1976	Randers Hallen, Randers, Denmark	
3	Win	3–0	Trevor Francis	PTS	6	Oct 9, 1976	Forum, Copenhagen, Denmark	
2	Win	2–0	Wayne Bennett	KO	5 (6)	Jun 3, 1976	Idraetshuset, Copenhagen, Denmark	
1	Win	1–0	Kurt Hombach	PTS	4	Apr 8, 1976	Forum, Copenhagen, Denmark	

== See also ==
- List of world light-middleweight boxing champions

Sporting positions
Regional boxing titles
Preceded by Al Korovou	Commonwealth middleweight champion 25 May 1978 – 1978; Vacated	Vacant Title next held by Tony Sibson
Vacant Title last held by Tony Sibson	EBU middleweight champion 20 June 1985 – 5 February 1986	Succeeded by Herol Graham
World boxing titles
Preceded by Masashi Kudo	WBA super welterweight champion 24 October 1979 – 25 June 1981	Succeeded by Sugar Ray Leonard
Preceded by Masashi Kudo	The Ring super welterweight champion 24 October 1979 – 25 June 1981	Succeeded by Sugar Ray Leonard
