= John Mugabi =

Ugandan boxer (born 1960)

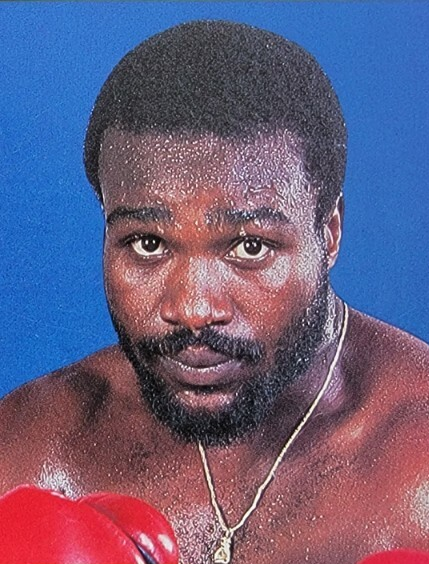
- Mugabi c. 1985

Personal information
- Nickname: Beast
- Nationality: Ugandan
- Born: 4 March 1960 (age 66) Kampala, Uganda
- Height: 5 ft 8.5 in (174 cm)
- Weight: Light-middleweight; Middleweight; Super-middleweight; Light-heavyweight

Boxing career
- Reach: 74 in (188 cm)
- Stance: Orthodox

Boxing record
- Total fights: 50
- Wins: 42
- Win by KO: 39
- Losses: 7
- Draws: 1
Medal record
Men's amateur boxing
Representing Uganda
Olympic Games
Silver medal – second place	1980 Moscow	Welterweight
All-Africa Games
Bronze medal – third place	1978 Algiers	Light-welterweight

John Mugabi (born March 4, 1960) is a Ugandan former professional boxer who competed from 1980 to 1999. He held the WBC super-welterweight title from 1989 to 1990, and challenged twice for world titles at middleweight, including the undisputed championship.

Mugabi was part of a talented group of light-middleweights and middleweights during a "golden era" of the 1980s which included Marvin Hagler, Sugar Ray Leonard, Thomas Hearns, Wilfred Benítez and Roberto Durán. As an amateur, Mugabi won a silver medal in the welterweight division at the 1980 Summer Olympics, and was the only medallist for Uganda at the event. He is listed #38 on Ring Magazine's list of 100 greatest punchers of all time

== Amateur career ==
Representing Uganda, Mugabi was the silver medalist at the 1980 Olympic Games in Moscow, boxing in the Welterweight class. Mugabi lost to Andrés Aldama of Cuba in the final.

He was also a silver medallist at the 1976 Junior World Championships, losing to Herol Graham in the final. Additionally, Mugabi won a bronze medal at the 1978 All-Africa Games in the light-welterweight division.

=== Highlights ===
(silver) 1976 Junior World Championships

- Finals: Lost to Herol Graham (United Kingdom)

World Championships (63,5 kg), Belgrade, Yugoslavia, May 1978:

- 1/16: Defeated Esko Pallaspuro (Finland) RSC 2
- 1/8: Lost to Jean-Claude Ruiz (France) by walkover

(bronze) All-Africa Games, Algiers, Algeria, July 1978:

- (no data available)

(silver) Golden Boat Tournament (67 kg), Łódź, Poland, February 1979:

- Finals: Lost to Grigoriy Lapshin (Soviet Union) by unanimous decision, 0–5

(bronze) TSC Tournament (67 kg), East Berlin, East Germany, October 1979:

- 1/4: Defeated Siegfried Vogelreuter (East Germany) RSC 2
- 1/2: Lost to Ionel Budusan (Romania)

(silver) Olympic Games (67 kg), Moscow, Soviet Union, July–August 1980:

- 1/16: Defeated Georges Koffi (Congo) KO 1
- 1/8: Defeated Paul Rasamimanana (Madagascar) KO 2
- 1/4: Defeated Mehmet Bogujevci (Yugoslavia) KO 1
- 1/2: Defeated Kazimierz Szczerba (Poland) by split decision, 3–2
- Finals: Lost to Andrés Aldama (Cuba) by majority decision, 1–4

=== Duals ===
- Uganda–Poland Duals (63,5 kg), Kampala, Uganda, January 1978: Lost to Bogdan Gajda PTS
- Uganda–GDR Duals (67 kg), Schwerin, East Germany, February 1979: Lost to Jochen Bachfeld PTS
- Uganda–Poland Duals (67 kg), Warsaw, Poland, February 1979: Lost to Piotr Bobrowski 1–2

== Professional career ==
Mugabi began his career as a professional boxer on December 5, 1980, with a first-round knock out Oemer Karadenis in Cologne. He subsequently moved to London and partnered with boxing promoter Mickey Duff, who arranged a series of fights in England that built Mugabi's regional reputation. After winning eight fights in Europe, Mugabi moved to Florida to face more formidable opponents. His consecutive knockout victories made him a favorite on American television networks securing notable stoppages over contenders such as Curtis Ramsey, Gary Guiden, Curtis Parker, Frank Fletcher, Nino Gonzalez, Earl Hargrove, and former world champion Eddie Gazo. Known as "The Beast" for his aggressive fighting style, Mugabi competed across both the middleweight and junior middleweight divisions, maintaining an undefeated knockout streak through the earl portion of his career.

Mugabi's first victory of note came on May 2, 1982, when he took on veteran Curtis Ramsey. It was Mugabi's 11th bout and he took care of the American in two rounds in Atlantic City, New Jersey. 1983 was a busy calendar year for the Beast. In that year he took on Gary Guiden, who had just come off of a world championship fight against Davey Moore; Mugabi stopped him in three. Many started speculating about Mugabi's role in the future of the Junior Middleweight and Middleweight divisions. The fact Mugabi easily made the weight at both divisions made him more intriguing than most prospects. Nicaraguan, Eddie Gazo, a former WBA Junior Middleweight Champion provided Mugabi with his first real test. Gazo went rounds with Mugabi, but 'The Beast' ended things the way he always did. Mugabi was simply stronger and faster tactically overwhelming the busier Gazo. In the same year, Mugabi took on Curtis Parker (a former Pennsylvania Golden Gloves amateur champion )The 'meeting' with Curtis Parker was on national television. Parker was an established fighter, but Mugabi's destruction of Parker was savage. It was the first time that Parker had lost a bout by knockout.

In February 1984 Mugabi's ability to take adversity was tested by James 'Hard Rock' Green. Mugabi slowly took control of the fight until it was stopped in the 10th round, with Mugabi declared the winner by technical knockout. The bout between 'The Beast' and Frank 'The Animal' Fletcher marked a quiet maturity that marked Mugabi's transformation from being what had been dubbed a 'banger' with raw power to a refined tactical boxer. The Beast hurt his prey, gently testing with his jabs and then in the 4th round a couple of roundhouse punches and a haymaker travelling all the way from his waist caught Fletcher asleep—the fight ended with Fletcher's body between the ropes.

On his way to becoming the number one contender for the middleweight title of each of the three major sanctioning bodies (WBA, WBC, and IBF), Mugabi ran roughshod over the division and finished each of his opponents inside the distance. Mugabi's ferocity was captured by Phil Berger. Writing in the New York Times in 1986, Berger, commenting on Mugabi's preparation for the Hagler fight noted the intensity of preparation that left his sparring partners in a 'woebegone condition' and further that some did not last long enough to draw their second paycheck and left Mugabi's training camp 'looking like extras from 'Night of the Living Dead'.

Because of his ability to fight both at junior middleweight and middleweight, fans began to talk about the possibility of him challenging either world light middleweight champion Hearns or world middleweight champion Hagler. Mugabi being a contender for some time, a Hearns – Mugabi title match never materialised, as Hearns elected to move to Middleweight to challenge Marvelous Marvin Hagler. Considering his streak and Hagler's tough battle with Hearns on April 15, 1985, Mugabi had a shot at doing what eleven men before him could not: wresting Hagler's undisputed world middleweight title from him. On March 10, 1986, Marvin 'Marvelous' Hagler rose to a challenge. A young powerhouse. John 'The Beast' Mugabi had won all of his contests by knockout; many in the first few rounds of the fight. He possessed knockout power and provided the boxing world with an epic encounter.

The fight was the first televised by Showtime. Mugabi landed his share of blows to Hagler's head during the early rounds. The turning point came in the sixth round when Hagler landed many heavy blows and staggered Mugabi. Mugabi fought back gamely but his early knockout wins left him ill-prepared for a long, tough fight. In the end, it was Hagler who came out the victor, with a knockout in the eleventh round. Many boxing fans consider this to have been the toughest contest of Hagler's career. Sugar Ray Leonard's decision to come out of retirement and challenge Hagler for the Middleweight Championship was heavily influenced by Hagler's performance in the Mugabi fight.

After his first loss, Mugabi retired to Uganda and ballooned in weight to 190 lbs. In September 1986 he contacted Mickey Duff, stating that he was ready to fight again. Mugabi went down in weight and was given an opportunity by the WBC to win their world light middleweight title, vacated by Hearns. Once again many fans favoured him, this time against Duane Thomas, on December 5 of '86. However, Mugabi suffered a broken eye socket, the consequence of a punch in round three and the fight had to be stopped. Mugabi underwent optical surgery the next day to repair his injury.

Discouraged by two consecutive losses, Mugabi gained weight and did not fight for nearly fourteen months. In January 1988, he came back to fight Bryan Grant on the undercard of Mike Tyson's title defence against Larry Holmes. Mugabi won by quick knockout and set off on another knockout winning streak. He became number one contender for the WBC 154 lb title in August 1988 but could not land a fight with then-champion Donald Curry. After Curry lost his title in an upset in early 1989, Mugabi was given another opportunity to become world champion by the WBC. On July 8 of that year, Mugabi finally made his dream come true, when Curry's successor Rene Jacquot could not continue the fight due to an injury in round one in Grenoble to become the WBC light middleweight champion. After two first-round knockout wins against Ricky Stackhouse and Carlos Antunes, Mugabi, who by this time was having difficulty making the weight limit of 154 lbs, put his title on the line against Terry Norris. When Norris downed the champion for the count with a right to the jaw, Mugabi received the dubious distinction as the second fighter, after Al Singer, to both win and lose a world title by the first-round knockout when he was defeated by Norris. Showing resilience, Mugabi resurfaced with two more wins and once again found himself fighting for a world title, facing Gerald McClellan on November 20, 1991, in London for the vacant WBO middleweight championship. Mugabi looked a shadow of his former self by this time, and once again came out on the losing end, again by a first-round knockout.

Mugabi took a five-year layoff in which he moved to Australia. In 1996, he came back for the first of an eight-fight comeback. He went on to claim the Australian middleweight championship by way of a 12th-round decision over Jamie Wallace. It only took John two fights before he was in line for a world title again. In his third fight back from the loss to Norris, Mugabi would challenge Glen Kelly. That November night in 1999, marked the decline of Mugabi's illustrious boxing career as he was again knocked out in the eighth round. Mugabi resides in Australia where among other functions he trains fighters.

When Mugabi finally retired, he had a record of 42 wins, 7 losses and 1 draw, 39 wins by knockout. His 25 fight knockout win streak stands as one of the longest knockout streaks ever in boxing.

=== Life after boxing ===
Mugabi has a daughter, Mildred Prudence Mugabi who lives in Tampa, Florida and he has another daughter who still resides in Kampala, Uganda named Mourine Basemera Mugabi.

== Professional boxing record ==
50 fights	42 wins	7 losses
By knockout	39	6
By decision	3	1
Draws	1	

No.	Result	Record	Opponent	Type	Round, time	Date	Location	Notes
50	Loss	42–7–1	Glen Kelly	TKO	8 (12)	16 Jan 1999	Alexandria Basketball Stadium, Sydney, Australia	For IBF Pan Pacific and Australian light-heavyweight titles
49	Loss	42–6–1	Anthony Bigeni	TKO	8 (12)	19 Jul 1998	Downtown Convention Centre, Auckland, New Zealand	For PABA light-heavyweight title
48	Win	42–5–1	Paul Smallman	UD	10	26 Feb 1998	Southport RSL Club, Gold Coast, Australia	
47	Loss	41–5–1	William Bo James	UD	10	13 Jan 1998	Foxwoods Resort Casino, Ledyard, Connecticut, US	
46	Draw	41–4–1	Paul Smallman	TD	2 (10)	18 Dec 1997	Southport RSL Club, Gold Coast, Australia	
45	Win	41–4	Jamie Wallace	UD	12	19 Jun 1997	Gold Coast, Australia	Won vacant Australian super-middleweight title
44	Win	40–4	Ambrose Mlilo	TKO	10 (10), 1:44	20 Feb 1997	National Convention Centre, Canberra, Australia	
43	Win	39–4	Peter Kinsella	PTS	10	16 Dec 1996	Gold Coast, Australia	
42	Loss	38–4	Gerald McClellan	TKO	1 (12), 2:51	20 Nov 1991	Royal Albert Hall, London, England	For vacant WBO middleweight title
41	Win	38–3	Kevin Whaley-El	TKO	4	12 Sep 1991	Latchmere Leisure Centre, London, England	
40	Win	37–3	James Williamson	TKO	3	12 Jul 1991	Palais des Festivals et des Congrès, Cannes, France	
39	Loss	36–3	Terry Norris	KO	1 (12), 2:47	31 Mar 1990	USF Sun Dome, Tampa, Florida, US	Lost WBC super-welterweight title
38	Win	36–2	Carlos Antunes	KO	1 (10), 2:44	10 Jan 1990	Royal Albert Hall, London, England	
37	Win	35–2	Ricky Stackhouse	TKO	1 (?)	30 Oct 1989	Pavillon Baltard, Nogent-sur-Marne, France	
36	Win	34–2	René Jacquot	TKO	1 (12)	8 Jul 1989	Mirapolis, Cergy-Pontoise, France	Won WBC super-welterweight title
35	Win	33–2	Ralph Smiley	TKO	2	20 Mar 1989	Nogent-le-Phaye, France	
34	Win	32–2	Kenneth Styles	TKO	1 (10)	23 Feb 1989	The Palace, Auburn Hills, Michigan, US	
33	Win	31–2	Francisco Carballo	TKO	2 (10), 1:30	4 Feb 1989	Caesars Palace, Paradise, Nevada, US	
32	Win	30–2	Mike Sacchetti	TKO	3 (10)	27 Sep 1988	Players Athletic Club, Sharpsville, Pennsylvania, US	
31	Win	29–2	Kenny Snow	TKO	4 (10), 2:59	7 Jul 1988	Hyatt Regency, Tampa, Florida, US	
30	Win	28–2	Gonzalo Montes	TKO	3	4 Jun 1988	Lee County Civic Center, North Fort Myers, Florida, US	
29	Win	27–2	Knox Brown	TKO	3 (10), 1:04	5 May 1988	Sands, Atlantic City, New Jersey, US	
28	Win	26–2	Bryan Grant	TKO	2 (6), 2:51	22 Jan 1988	Convention Hall, Atlantic City, New Jersey, US	
27	Loss	25–2	Duane Thomas	TKO	3 (12), 0:56	5 Dec 1986	Caesars Palace, Paradise, Nevada, US	For vacant WBC super-welterweight title
26	Loss	25–1	Marvin Hagler	KO	11 (12), 1:29	10 Mar 1986	Caesars Palace, Paradise, Nevada, US	For WBA, WBC, IBF, The Ring, and lineal middleweight titles
25	Win	25–0	Bill Bradley	RTD	4 (10), 3:00	6 Aug 1985	Harrah's at Trump Plaza, Atlantic City, New Jersey, US	
24	Win	24–0	Earl Hargrove	KO	1 (10), 1:33	17 Mar 1985	Egypt Shrine Temple, Tampa, Florida, US	
23	Win	23–0	Nino Gonzalez	KO	1	25 Sep 1984	Wembley Arena, London, England	
22	Win	22–0	Frank Fletcher	TKO	4 (10), 2:03	5 Aug 1984	Egypt Shrine Temple, Tampa, Florida, US	
21	Win	21–0	Wilbert Johnson	KO	2 (10), 0:45	27 May 1984	Hotel del Lago Casino, Maracaibo, Venezuela	
20	Win	20–0	James Green	TKO	10 (10), 1:29	19 Feb 1984	Hyatt Regency, Tampa, Florida, US	
19	Win	19–0	Curtis Parker	KO	1 (10), 2:59	12 Nov 1983	USF Sun Dome, Tampa, Florida, US	
18	Win	18–0	Eddie Gazo	TKO	4 (10), 2:37	8 Oct 1983	Playboy Hotel and Casino, Atlantic City, New Jersey, US	
17	Win	17–0	Don Morgan	KO	1 (10), 2:11	16 Sep 1983	Tampa, Florida, US	
16	Win	16–0	Jeff Nelson	TKO	2 (10)	5 Aug 1983	Hyatt Regency, Tampa, Florida, US	
15	Win	15–0	Gary Guiden	TKO	3 (10), 1:35	3 Jul 1983	Curtis Hixon Hall, Tampa, Florida, US	
14	Win	14–0	Roosevelt Green	TKO	1	15 May 1983	Caesars Palace, Paradise, Nevada, US	
13	Win	13–0	Doug Demmings	TKO	5 (8)	23 Oct 1982	Berlin, Germany	
12	Win	12–0	Steve Williams	TKO	6 (10)	15 Sep 1982	Madison Square Garden, New York City, New York, US	
11	Win	11–0	Curtis Ramsey	KO	1 (10), 2:58	2 May 1982	Playboy Hotel and Casino, Atlantic City, New Jersey, US	
10	Win	10–0	Curtis Taylor	KO	2	26 Mar 1982	Kiel, West Germany	
9	Win	9–0	Sammy Floyd	KO	2	26 Dec 1981	Gelsenkirchen, West Germany	
8	Win	8–0	Darwin Brewster	KO	6 (8), 1:40	16 Nov 1981	Hilton on Park Lane, London, England	
7	Win	7–0	John Mwansa	KO	1	31 Oct 1981	Lusaka, Zambia	
6	Win	6–0	Ronnie Ford	KO	1	25 Sep 1981	Cologne, West Germany	
5	Win	5–0	Pedro Guerrero	TKO	2	30 May 1981	Showboat Hotel and Casino, Las Vegas, Nevada, US	
4	Win	4–0	Dennis Pryce	KO	1 (8), 1:52	11 May 1981	Hilton on Park Lane, London, England	
3	Win	3–0	Mauricio Fernandes da Cruz	TKO	4	10 Apr 1981	Kiel, West Germany	
2	Win	2–0	Giampaolo Piras	TKO	2 (6)	12 Feb 1981	Kiel, West Germany	
1	Win	1–0	Oemer Karadenis	TKO	1	5 Dec 1980	Cologne, West Germany	

== Personal life ==
Mugabi is father to one daughter named Maureen Mugabi, the 2 had been separated but reunited after 28 years.

Sporting positions
Regional boxing titles
Vacant Title last held by Darren Obah	Australian super-middleweight champion 19 June 1997 – December 1997; Vacated	Vacant Title next held by Sam Soliman
World boxing titles
Preceded by René Jacquot	WBC super-welterweight champion 8 July 1989 – 31 March 1990	Succeeded by Terry Norris
