= Georges Koffi =

Congolese boxer (born 1956)

Georges Koffi (born 8 March 1956) is a boxer from the Republic of Congo, who competed in the welterweight (– 67 kg) division at the 1980 Summer Olympics. Koffi lost his opening bout to John Mugabi of Uganda. He was born in Mindouli, French Congo.

== 1980 Olympic results ==
Below is the record of Georges Koffi, a Congolese welterweight boxer who competed at the 1980 Moscow Olympics:

- Round of 32: lost to John Mugabi (Uganda) by knockout
