= Eddie Gazo =

Nicaraguan boxer

Personal information
- Born: Eddie Jose Gazo Roa; 12 September 1950 (age 75) San Lorenzo, Nicaragua
- Height: 5 ft 6 1/2 in (169 cm)
- Weight: Light middleweight

Boxing career
- Reach: 69 in (175 cm)
- Stance: Orthodox

Boxing record
- Total fights: 54
- Wins: 40
- Win by KO: 22
- Losses: 12
- Draws: 2

Eddie Jose Gazo Roa (born 12 September 1950) is a Nicaraguan former professional boxer who competed from 1969 to 1984. He held the Lineal and WBA light middleweight titles from 1977 to 1978.

== Professional career ==
Gazo turned pro in 1971, and captured the WBA and lineal light middleweight titles in 1977 with a decision win over Miguel Angel Castellini. That year he was named The Ring magazine Progress of the Year fighter. He defended the belt three times before losing it to Masashi Kudo the following year. He retired in 1984 following a string of losses that concluded with a defeat to Julian Jackson.

== Professional boxing record ==
54 fights	40 wins	12 losses
By knockout	22	9
By decision	18	3
Draws	2	

No.	Result	Record	Opponent	Type	Round	Date	Location	Notes
54	Loss	40–12–2	Julian Jackson	KO	2 (10)	Mar 17, 1984	Hiram Bithorn Stadium, San Juan, Puerto Rico	
53	Loss	40–11–2	John Mortensen	PTS	6	Dec 1, 1983	K.B. Hallen, Copenhagen, Denmark	
52	Loss	40–10–2	John Mugabi	TKO	4 (10)	Oct 8, 1983	Atlantic City, New Jersey, U.S.	
51	Loss	40–9–2	Fulgencio Obelmejias	KO	2 (?)	Oct 6, 1981	Caracas, Venezuela	
50	Loss	40–8–2	Bert Lee	KO	6 (10)	Apr 24, 1981	Cow Palace, San Francisco, California, U.S.	
49	Loss	40–7–2	Miguel Ángel Castellini	KO	9 (10)	Sep 20, 1980	Luna Park, Buenos Aires, Argentina	
48	Win	40–6–2	Edgar Bravo	KO	1 (?)	Sep 5, 1980	Managua, Nicaragua	
47	Loss	39–6–2	Thomas Hearns	KO	1 (10)	May 3, 1980	Cobo Hall, Detroit, Michigan, U.S.	
46	Win	39–5–2	Lino Cajina	KO	10 (?)	Feb 23, 1980	Managua, Nicaragua	
45	Win	38–5–2	Carlos Grimaldi	PTS	10	Jan 19, 1980	Managua, Nicaragua	
44	Win	37–5–2	Trombo Machado	KO	5 (?)	Dec 14, 1979	San Jose, Costa Rica	
43	Win	36–5–2	Ezequiel Obando	KO	9 (?)	Nov 5, 1979	San Salvador, El Salvador	
42	Win	35–5–2	Pedro Cisneros	PTS	10	Oct 3, 1979	Managua, Nicaragua	
41	Loss	34–5–2	Masashi Kudo	SD	15	Aug 9, 1978	Akita City, Japan	Lost WBA and The Ring junior-middleweight titles
40	Win	34–4–2	Jae-Keum Lim	SD	15	Dec 18, 1977	Incheon, South Korea	Retained WBA and The Ring junior-middleweight titles
39	Win	33–4–2	Kenji Shibata	UD	15	Sep 13, 1977	Nihon Budokan, Tokyo, Japan	Retained WBA and The Ring junior-middleweight titles
38	Win	32–4–2	Koichi Wajima	TKO	11 (15)	Jun 7, 1977	Nihon Budokan, Tokyo, Japan	Retained WBA and The Ring junior-middleweight titles
37	Win	31–4–2	Miguel Ángel Castellini	UD	15	Mar 5, 1977	Managua, Nicaragua	Won WBA and The Ring junior-middleweight titles
36	Win	30–4–2	Jorge De Avila	KO	7	Sep 4, 1976	Managua, Nicaragua	
35	Win	29–4–2	Dino Del Cid	TKO	3 (?)	Jul 3, 1976	Managua, Nicaragua	
34	Win	28–4–2	Rosalio Matute	KO	5 (?)	May 15, 1976	Managua, Nicaragua	
33	Win	27–4–2	Rodrigo Delgado	TKO	10 (12)	Mar 13, 1976	Managua, Nicaragua	Retained Central America light middleweight title
32	Loss	26–4–2	Carlos Obregon	RTD	5 (10)	Apr 18, 1975	Bogota, Colombia	
31	Win	26–3–2	Edmond Camayagua	KO	6 (12)	Feb 7, 1975	Managua, Nicaragua	
30	Win	25–3–2	Rodolfo Contreras	KO	10	May 22, 1974	Costa Rica	
29	Win	24–3–2	Sugar Sanders	PTS	10	Apr 20, 1974	Esteli, Nicaragua	
28	Win	23–3–2	Roberto Arias	PTS	10	Aug 4, 1974	Managua, Nicaragua	Won Central America light middleweight title
27	Win	22–3–2	Hernan Grimaldi	KO	4 (12)	Mar 18, 1974	Managua, Nicaragua	
26	Draw	21–3–2	Adalberto Vanegas	PTS	10	Jan 20, 1974	Plaza de Toros de Cartagena de Indias, Cartagena, Colombia	
25	Win	21–3–1	Roberto Arias	KO	8 (?)	Jan 12, 1974	Estadio Roberto Clemente Stadium, Masaya, Nicaragua	
24	Win	20–3–1	Sugar Sanders	KO	6 (?)	Oct 10, 1973	Managua, Nicaragua	
23	Win	19–3–1	Frank Medina	PTS	10	Jul 28, 1973	Managua, Nicaragua	
22	Win	18–3–1	Arturo Negra	PTS	10	Mar 3, 1973	Managua, Nicaragua	
21	Draw	17–3–1	Julio Blanco	PTS	10	Feb 2, 1973	Managua, Nicaragua	
20	Win	17–3	Tarzan Suazo	KO	6	Jan 1, 1973	Esteli, Nicaragua	
19	Win	16–3	Carlos Espinosa	PTS	12	Mar 18, 1972	Managua, Nicaragua	Won vacant Nicaraguian welterweight title
18	Win	15–3	Leo Campbell	PTS	10	Mar 10, 1972	Chinandega, Nicaragua	
17	Win	14–3	Felix Bojorge	KO	5 (?)	Mar 1, 1972	Chinandega, Nicaragua	
16	Win	13–3	Zapito Menochal	PTS	10	Feb 20, 1972	Chinandega, Nicaragua	
15	Win	12–3	Freddy Menochal	PTS	10	Feb 10, 1972	Chinandega, Nicaragua	
14	Win	11–3	Henry Thompson	KO	5 (?)	Feb 1, 1972	Chinandega, Nicaragua	
13	Win	10–3	Frank Darce	PTS	10	Jan 30, 1972	Leon, Nicaragua	
12	Win	9–3	Monaco Valle	KO	1 (?)	Jan 20, 1972	Jinotepe, Nicaragua	
11	Win	8–3	Gerardo Sanders	KO	2 (?)	Jan 10, 1972	Managua, Nicaragua	
10	Win	7–3	Roberto Arias	PTS	10	Jan 1, 1972	Chinandega, Nicaragua	
9	Win	6–3	Carlos Ampie	KO	3 (?)	Oct 30, 1971	Granada, Nicaragua	
8	Win	5–3	Orlando Sinclair	KO	5 (?)	Oct 23, 1971	Managua, Nicaragua	
7	Win	4–3	Carlos Sanchez	PTS	6	Oct 20, 1971	Managua, Nicaragua	
6	Win	3–3	Sol Brillante Mitchell	KO	3 (?)	Oct 10, 1971	Leon, Nicaragua	
5	Win	2–3	Carlos Espinosa	PTS	10	Sep 19, 1970	Managua, Nicaragua	
4	Loss	1–3	Joe Scott	KO	4 (8)	Jul 23, 1970	Gimnasio Nacional Eddy Cortés, San Jose, Costa Rica	
3	Loss	1–2	Carlos Espinosa	TKO	7 (12)	Jun 20, 1970	Managua, Nicaragua	For vacant Nicaraguian welterweight title
2	Win	1–1	Carlos Espinosa	PTS	6	Jun 20, 1970	Leon, Nicaragua	
1	Loss	0–1	Omar Perez	PTS	6	Mar 1, 1969	Estadio Cranshaw, Managua, Nicaragua	Professional debut (via Bob Yalen)

== See also ==
- List of world light-middleweight boxing champions

Sporting positions
World boxing titles
Preceded by Miguel Ángel Castellini	WBA super welterweight champion March 5, 1977 - August 9, 1978	Succeeded by Masashi Kudo
Preceded by Miguel Ángel Castellini	The Ring super welterweight champion March 5, 1977 - August 9, 1978	Succeeded by Masashi Kudo
Awards
Previous: Ruben Castillo	The Ring Progress of the Year; 1977	Next: Leon Spinks
