= Miguel Ángel Castellini =

Argentine boxer (1947–2020)

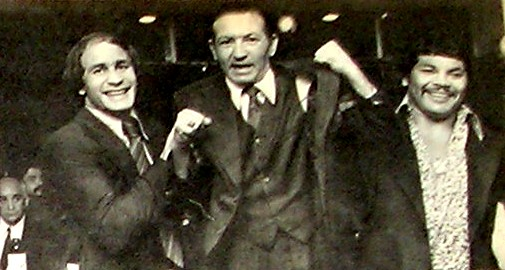
- Castellini (left) alongside Pascual Pérez and Víctor Galíndez in 1976

Personal information
- Nickname: Cloroformo
- Born: January 26, 1947 Santa Rosa, La Pampa, Argentina
- Died: October 28, 2020 (aged 73) Buenos Aires, Argentina
- Height: 5 ft 11 3/4 in (182 cm)
- Weight: Light middleweight

Boxing career
- Stance: Orthodox

Boxing record
- Total fights: 94
- Wins: 74
- Win by KO: 51
- Losses: 8
- Draws: 12

Miguel Ángel Castellini (26 January 1947 – 28 October 2020) was an Argentine professional boxer. Castellini, who was active as a professional from 1965 to 1980, is most notable for having held the WBA and lineal light middleweight titles from 1976 to 1977.

He died from COVID-19 during the COVID-19 pandemic in Argentina.

== Professional career ==
Castellini began his professional career on 28 May 1965, in San Miguel de Tucumán against Domingo Gerez. Castellini scored a second round knockout over Gerez to record his first win. He remained undefeated over his first thirteen fights before suffering his first loss to Hermogenes Quintela. Quintela knocked Castellini out in the tenth round of their fight on 9 September 1966.

On 4 November 1972 Castellini won his first championship by beating Hector Ricardo Palleres to claim the Argentine light middleweight title. Castellini fought for the first time outside of his native Argentina on 25 May 1974, he travelled to Monaco to beat Carlos Alberto Salinas. During his career Castellini also fought in Italy, Puerto Rico, Denmark, Nicaragua, and Spain.

It was while in Spain that Castellini challenged for the WBA and lineal light middleweight titles, then held by Jose Manuel Duran, in front of a sell out crowd of 12,000. Duran, who was making the first defence of his title, was knocked down in the third round by a left hand to the jaw. Although the champion rose from the canvas, he was outworked by the faster challenger and lost his title via a split decision in a fight where both boxers finished with bloody faces.

Castellini's championship reign only lasted one fight as he lost it in his first defence to Eddie Gazo on 5 March 1977. Gazo, fighting in his hometown of Managua, Nicaragua, defeated Castellini via unanimous decision with scores of: 144–149, 144–148, and 143–148. This defeat was avenged, however, in a non-title bout on 20 September 1980. On this occasion Gazo travelled to Argentina to take on Castellini. Castellini won the fight by knockout in the ninth round in what was to be his final professional fight.

== Professional boxing record ==
94 fights	74 wins	8 losses
By knockout	51	6
By decision	23	2
Draws	12	

No.	Result	Record	Opponent	Type	Round, time	Date	Location	Notes
94	Win	74–8–12	(Nicaragua) Eddie Gazo	KO	9 (10)	1980–09–20	Estadio Luna Park, Buenos Aires, Argentina	
93	Win	73–8–12	(Argentina) Alfredo Cicopiedi	TKO	8 (10)	1980–08–22	Bahia Blanca, Argentina	
92	Win	72–8–12	(Argentina) Alfredo Cicopiedi	TKO	7 (10)	1980–07–04	San Nicolas, Argentina	
91	Win	71–8–12	(Argentina) Alfredo Cicopiedi	PTS	10	1980–06–20	Mar del Plata, Argentina	
90	Win	70–8–12	(United States) Al Styles, Jr.	PTS	10	1980–05–03	Estadio Luna Park, Buenos Aires, Argentina	
89	Win	69–8–12	(Argentina) Raul Paez	TKO	5 (10)	1980–04–18	San Salvador de Jujuy, Argentina	
88	Win	68–8–12	(Panama) Sixto Gomez	KO	2 (10) 1:00	1980–02–15	Mar del Plata, Argentina	
87	Draw	67–8–12	(Argentina) Julio Cesar Arancibia	PTS	10	1980–01–11	Villa Carlos Paz, Argentina	
86	Win	67–8–11	(Argentina) Hugo Trujillo	TKO	7 (10)	1979–12–21	San Salvador de Jujuy, Argentina	
85	Loss	66–8–11	(Argentina) Alfredo Cabral	TKO	8 (10)	1979–06–09	Estadio Luna Park, Buenos Aires, Argentina	
84	Win	66–7–11	(Argentina) Juan Alberto Mora	RTD	7 (10)	1979–05–17	Villa Carlos Paz, Argentina	
83	Win	65–7–11	(Argentina) Manuel Gonzalez	PTS	10	1979–01–19	Mar del Plata, Argentina	
82	Draw	64–7–11	(Argentina) Camilo Gaitan	PTS	10	1978–05–13	Estadio Luna Park, Buenos Aires, Argentina	
81	Win	64–7–10	(Argentina) Roque Roldan	TKO	4 (10)	1978–04–20	Posadas, Argentina	
80	Win	63–7–10	(Argentina) Alberto Almiron	PTS	10	1978–04–07	Santa Rosa, Argentina	
79	Loss	62–7–10	(Uganda) Ayub Kalule	TKO	3 (10)	1977–11–03	Arena Randers, Randers, Denmark	
78	Loss	62–6–10	(Nicaragua) Eddie Gazo	UD	15	1977–03–05	Estadio Nacional de Beisbol, Managua, Nicaragua	Lost WBA and The Ring light middleweight titles
77	Win	62–5–10	(Spain) José Manuel Duran	SD	15	1976–10–08	Palacio de los Deportes, Madrid, Spain	Won WBA and The Ring light middleweight titles
76	Draw	61–5–10	(Argentina) Octavio Escauriza	PTS	10	1976–08–20	Rosario, Argentina	
75	Win	61–5–9	(Argentina) Juan Carlos Artaza	PTS	10	1976–07–15	San Juan, Argentina	
74	Win	60–5–9	(United States) Radames Cabrera	PTS	10	1976–02–23	Paris, France	
73	Win	59–5–9	(France) Jules Bellaiche	KO	6 (10)	1976–02–09	Palais des Sports, Paris, France	
72	Win	58–5–9	(United States) James Marshall	KO	4 (10)	1975–12–08	Paris, France	
71	Loss	57–5–9	(Puerto Rico) Sandy Torres	TKO	4 (10)	1975–10–03	Milan, Italy	
70	Win	57–4–9	(Spain) Mimoun Mohatar	KO	9 (10)	1975–09–19	Milan, Italy	
69	Win	56–4–9	(Argentina) Rodolfo Rosales	PTS	10	1975–05–03	Estadio Luna Park, Buenos Aires, Argentina	
68	Win	55–4–9	(Argentina) Norberto Cabrera	TKO	5 (10)	1975–04–11	Salta, Argentina	
67	Win	54–4–9	(United States) Melvin Dennis	KO	2 (10)	1975–01–17	Balcarce, Argentina	
66	Win	53–4–9	(United States) Manuel Fierro	KO	8 (10)	1974–12–13	Estadio Luna Park, Buenos Aires, Argentina	
65	Win	52–4–9	(Chile) Manuel Tapia	TKO	6 (10)	1974–10–18	San Carlos Minas, Argentina	
64	Win	51–4–9	(United States) Roy McMillan	PTS	10	1974–06–07	Palazzetto dello Sport, Roma, Italy	
63	Win	50–4–9	(Argentina) Carlos Salinas	KO	2 (10)	1974–05–25	Stade Louis II, Fontvieille, Monaco	
62	Win	49–4–9	(Argentina) Ramón La Cruz	PTS	12	1973–12–08	Estadio Luna Park, Buenos Aires, Argentina	Retained Argentine Light middleweight title.
61	Win	48–4–9	(Peru) Carlos Estrada	KO	2 (10)	1973–11–15	Bahia Blanca, Argentina	
60	Win	47–4–9	(Argentina) Hector Galvan	TKO	3 (10)	1973–10–31	San Miguel, Argentina	
59	Draw	46–4–9	(Argentina) Ramón La Cruz	PTS	10	1973–08–04	Estadio Luna Park, Buenos Aires, Argentina	
58	Win	46–4–8	(Trinidad and Tobago) Carlos Marks	PTS	10	1973–06–09	Estadio Luna Park, Buenos Aires, Argentina	
57	Win	45–4–8	(United States) Doc Holliday	PTS	10	1973–04–07	Estadio Luna Park, Buenos Aires, Argentina	
56	Win	44–4–8	(Argentina) Roberto Carabajal	KO	1 (10)	1973–03–23	La Rioja, Argentina	
55	Win	43–4–8	(Argentina) Ruben Martinez	RTD	5 (10)	1973–02–01	Salta, Argentina	
54	Win	42–4–8	(Trinidad and Tobago) Matt Donovan	KO	2 (10)	1972–12–09	Estadio Luna Park, Buenos Aires, Argentina	
53	Win	41–4–8	(Mexico) Raúl Soriano	TKO	2 (10)	1972–11–25	Estadio Luna Park, Buenos Aires, Argentina	
52	Win	40–4–8	(Argentina) Héctor Palleres	KO	1 (12)	1972–11–04	Estadio Luna Park, Buenos Aires, Argentina	Won Argentine Light middleweight title.
51	Win	39–4–8	(Argentina) Raúl Pereyra	TKO	3 (10)	1972–09–23	Estadio Luna Park, Buenos Aires, Argentina	
50	Win	38–4–8	(Argentina) Miguel Chequer	PTS	10	1972–08–11	La Plata, Argentina	
49	Win	37–4–8	(Argentina) Ramón Pereyra	TKO	3 (10)	1972–06–07	Buenos Aires, Argentina	
48	Win	36–4–8	(Argentina) Miguel Chequer	PTS	10	1972–05–19	La Plata, Argentina	
47	Win	35–4–8	(Brazil) Edmundo Leite	TKO	5 (10)	1972–02–25	Ginásio do Palmeiras, Sao Paulo, Brazil	
46	Win	34–4–8	(Argentina) Ramón Pereyra	TKO	9 (10)	1972–02–08	La Rioja, Argentina	
45	Win	33–4–8	(Argentina) Ruben Martinez	KO	6 (10)	1971–12–22	Buenos Aires, Argentina	
44	Win	32–4–8	(Argentina) Alberto Massi	TKO	5 (10)	1971–12–03	Santa Rosa, Argentina	
43	Win	31–4–8	(Argentina) Hector Galvan	TKO	4 (10)	1971–11–10	Buenos Aires, Argentina	
42	Win	30–4–8	(Argentina) Antenor Santillan	TKO	6 (10)	1971–09–17	La Rioja, Argentina	
41	Win	29–4–8	(Argentina) Roberto Carabajal	TKO	8 (10)	1971–07–08	La Rioja, Argentina	
40	Win	28–4–8	(Argentina) Domingo Guerrero	TKO	8 (10)	1971–06–11	La Rioja, Argentina	
39	Win	27–4–8	(Argentina) Ivan Rojas	TKO	4 (10)	1971–05–07	La Rioja, Argentina	
38	Loss	26–4–8	(Peru) Carlos Estrada	TKO	5 (10)	1969–10–31	Santa Rosa, Argentina	
37	Win	26–3–8	(Argentina) Enrique Orona	TKO	9 (10)	1969–09–26	Santa Rosa, Argentina	
36	Win	25–3–8	(Argentina) Raúl Pereyra	KO	2 (10)	1969–09–12	Rio Cuarto, Argentina	
35	Win	24–3–8	(Argentina) Osvaldo Marino	PTS	10	1969–05–23	Santa Rosa, Argentina	
34	Win	23–3–8	(Uruguay) Luis Pereyra	KO	1 (10) 1:00	1968–10–21	Bomberos Voluntarios, Bariloche, Argentina	
33	Win	22–3–8	(Mexico) Manuel Hernandez	KO	8 (10)	1968–08–07	San Carlos de Bariloche, Argentina	
32	Win	21–3–8	(Uruguay) Ruben Orrico	PTS	10	1968–07–06	San Carlos de Bariloche, Argentina	
31	Win	20–3–8	(Argentina) Carlos Raimundo	TKO	8 (10)	1968–06–15	San Carlos de Bariloche, Argentina	
30	Win	19–3–8	(Brazil) Moises Barbosa	TKO	3 (10)	1967–12–29	Club Independiente, La Rioja, Argentina	
29	Draw	18–3–8	(Argentina) Ramón Pereyra	PTS	10	1967–11–29	Buenos Aires, Argentina	
28	Draw	18–3–7	(Argentina) Leonardo Peralta	PTS	10	1967–11–10	La Rioja, Argentina	
27	Win	18–3–6	(Argentina) Armando Marchissio	UD	10	1967–09–22	La Rioja, Argentina	
26	Win	17–3–6	(Argentina) Ramón Silva	KO	3 (10) 2:30	1967–09–08	La Rioja, Argentina	
25	Draw	16–3–6	(Argentina) Ramón Pereyra	PTS	10	1967–08–23	Rio Cuarto, Argentina	
24	Draw	16–3–5	(Argentina) Ramón Pereyra	PTS	10	1967–07–14	Rio Cuarto, Argentina	
23	Win	16–3–4	(Argentina) Juan Carlos Velardez	TKO	10	1967–05–26	La Rioja, Argentina	
22	Win	15–3–4	(Argentina) Luis Andrada	PTS	10	1967–05–12	La Rioja, Argentina	
21	Win	14–3–4	(Argentina) Juan Carlos Quiroga	TKO	3 (10)	1967–04–21	La Rioja, Argentina	
20	Win	13–3–4	(Argentina) Luis Colman	KO	8 (10)	1967–04–06	La Rioja, Argentina	
19	Loss	12–3–4	(Argentina) Tito Del Barco	PTS	10	1967–03–17	Santa Rosa, Argentina	
18	Win	12–2–4	(Argentina) Matias Colque	TKO	3 (10)	1967–01–06	General Pico, Argentina	
17	Win	11–2–4	(Argentina) Luis Barrios	TKO	4 (10)	1966–12–07	Estadio Luna Park, Buenos Aires, Argentina	
16	Loss	10–2–4	(Argentina) José Paredes	TKO	5 (10)	1966–10–28	Rio Cuarto, Argentina	
15	Win	10–1–4	(Argentina) Kid Roldan	PTS	10	1966–10–16	Club Atletico Central Argentino, Rio Cuarto, Argentina	
14	Loss	9–1–4	(Argentina) Hermogenes Quintela	KO	10	1966–09–09	Alejo Ledesma, Argentina	
13	Win	9–0–4	(Argentina) Ramon Acosta	PTS	10	1966–08–26	San Miguel de Tucumán, Argentina	
12	Draw	8–0–4	(Argentina) Luis Andrada	PTS	10	1966–07–29	San Miguel de Tucumán, Argentina	
11	Win	8–0–3	(Argentina) Angel Osuna	PTS	10	1966–05–06	Santa Rosa, Argentina	
10	Draw	7–0–3	(Argentina) Alfredo Paz	PTS	10	1966–03–03	Santa Rosa, Argentina	
9	Win	7–0–2	(Argentina) Hector Paiva	TKO	5 (8)	1966–02–18	Santa Rosa, Argentina	
8	Draw	6–0–2	(Argentina) Walter Romero	PTS	8	1966–01–19	San Miguel de Tucumán, Argentina	
7	Win	6–0–1	(Uruguay) Amaro Millar	PTS	8	1965–12–10	Club Defensores de Villa Lujan, San Miguel, Argentina	
6	Draw	5–0–1	(Argentina) José Tula	PTS	10	1965–11–04	Concepcion, Argentina	
5	Win	5–0	(Argentina) Victor Plaza	KO	2 (8)	1965–10–27	La Rioja, Argentina	
4	Win	4–0	(Argentina) Osvaldo Varela	TKO	5 (8)	1965–10–22	Concepcion, Argentina	
3	Win	3–0	(Argentina) Juan José Leiva	KO	1 (8)	1965–10–08	San Miguel de Tucumán, Argentina	
2	Win	2–0	(Argentina) Abelardo Rosales	PTS	8	1965–06–18	San Miguel de Tucumán, Argentina	
1	Win	1–0	(Argentina) Domingo Gerez	KO	2 (6)	1965–05–28	San Miguel de Tucumán, Argentina	

== See also ==
- List of world light-middleweight boxing champions

Sporting positions
Regional boxing titles
Preceded by Hector Ricardo Palleres	Argentine light middleweight champion 4 November 1972 – January 1975; Vacated	Vacant Title next held by Esteban Osuna
World boxing titles
Preceded by José Manuel Durán	WBA super welterweight champion 8 October 1976 – 5 March 1977	Succeeded by Eddie Gazo
Preceded by José Manuel Durán	The Ring super welterweight champion 8 October 1976 – 5 March 1977	Succeeded by Eddie Gazo
