= Carel Sandon =

Italian boxer

Carel Sandon (born 29 March 1983) is an Italian professional lightweight boxer. He is the nephew of the WBA middleweight champion Sumbu Kalambay. Sandon, known as "Er Puma", has been a professional boxer since 2007. He has fought and won 14 matches in 4 years.

After an attempted suicide in 2011, he spent a long period of time in rehab. On February 22, 2013 he returned to competition at the Palasport of Montalto di Castro near Rome, where he fought and defeated Zoltan Horvarth.
