= Masashi Kudo (boxer) =

Japanese boxer (born 1951)

Personal information
- Nationality: Japanese
- Born: August 24, 1951 (age 75) Gojōme, Akita, Japan
- Height: 5 ft 8 in (173 cm)
- Weight: Light middleweight; Middleweight

Boxing career
- Stance: Orthodox

Boxing record
- Total fights: 24
- Wins: 23
- Win by KO: 12
- Losses: 1

Masashi Kudo (工藤 政志, Kudō Masashi; born August 24, 1951) is a Japanese former professional boxer who competed from 1973 to 1979. He held the WBA and lineal super welterweight titles from 1978 to 1979.

== Biography ==
Kudo was an amateur wrestler during high school, and only became a professional boxer when he failed to join the Japanese Olympic wrestling team for the 1972 Munich Olympics. He made his professional debut in May, 1973, and won the Japanese middleweight title in his 6th professional fight. He defended the title 8 times before returning it to Japanese Boxing Commission.

In 1978, he moved down to the light middleweight division to challenge Eddie Gazo for the WBA and lineal light middleweight titles. Kudo won by 15 round split-decision, becoming the second Japanese boxer to capture the world light middleweight crown since Koichi Wajima.

Kudo defended his title three times including against Korean contender Ho Joo, before losing to undefeated challenger Ayub Kalule by unanimous decision for his only professional loss. He announced his retirement after the fight at only 28 years of age. His record was 23-1-0 (12KOs).

Kudo was possibly one of the least technically skilled champions in boxing history. He compensated for his lack of skill by displaying an enormous amount of stamina and strength, and retired without suffering a single knockdown.

== Professional boxing record ==
| 24 fights | 23 wins | 1 loss |
|---|---|---|
| By knockout | 12 | 0 |
| By decision | 11 | 1 |

| No. | Result | Record | Opponent | Type | Round | Date | Location | Notes |
|---|---|---|---|---|---|---|---|---|
| 24 | Loss | 23–1 | Ayub Kalule | UD | 15 | Oct 24, 1979 | City Gymnasium, Akita City, Akita, Japan | Lost WBA and The Ring junior-middleweight titles |
| 23 | Win | 23–0 | Manuel Ricardo Gonzalez | TKO | 12 (15) | Jun 20, 1979 | City Gymnasium, Yokkaichi, Mie, Japan | Retained WBA and The Ring junior-middleweight titles |
| 22 | Win | 22–0 | Manuel Ricardo Gonzalez | MD | 15 | May 14, 1979 | Ryōgoku Kokugikan, Tokyo, Japan | Retained WBA and The Ring junior-middleweight titles |
| 21 | Win | 21–0 | Ho Joo | SD | 15 | Dec 13, 1978 | Prefectural Gymnasium, Osaka, Japan | Retained WBA and The Ring junior-middleweight titles |
| 20 | Win | 20–0 | Eddie Gazo | SD | 15 | Aug 9, 1978 | City Gymnasium, Akita City, Akita, Japan | Won WBA and The Ring junior-middleweight titles |
| 19 | Win | 19–0 | Katsuo Esashi | PTS | 10 | May 2, 1978 | Japan | Retained Japanese middleweight title |
| 18 | Win | 18–0 | Katsuo Esashi | RTD | 3 (10) | Oct 31, 1977 | Japan | |
| 17 | Win | 17–0 | Peter Nanboku | KO | 9 (10) | Sep 6, 1977 | Korakuen Hall, Tokyo, Japan | Retained Japanese middleweight title |
| 16 | Win | 16–0 | Saburo Sakai | KO | 7 (10) | Jul 2, 1977 | Kumagaya, Japan | |
| 15 | Win | 15–0 | Yuichiro Watanabe | PTS | 10 | May 3, 1977 | Japan | Retained Japanese middleweight title |
| 14 | Win | 14–0 | Saburo Sakai | KO | 9 (10) | Jan 30, 1977 | Nippon Budokan, Tokyo, Japan | Retained Japanese middleweight title |
| 13 | Win | 13–0 | Nessie Horiguchi | PTS | 10 | Sep 26, 1976 | Japan | |
| 12 | Win | 12–0 | Yuichiro Watanabe | KO | 3 (10) | Jun 27, 1976 | Japan | Retained Japanese middleweight title |
| 11 | Win | 11–0 | Saburo Sakai | KO | 1 (10) | Mar 28, 1976 | Japan | |
| 10 | Win | 10–0 | Takeshi Izumi | KO | 4 (10) | Jan 27, 1976 | Okinawa, Japan | Retained Japanese middleweight title |
| 9 | Win | 9–0 | Yuji Miyagoshi | UD | 10 | Nov 30, 1975 | Japan | Retained Japanese middleweight title |
| 8 | Win | 8–0 | Yuji Miyagoshi | PTS | 10 | Jul 18, 1975 | Japan | Retained Japanese middleweight title |
| 7 | Win | 7–0 | Takeshi Watanabe | PTS | 10 | Jun 1, 1975 | Japan | |
| 6 | Win | 6–0 | Nobuyoshi Ozaki | PTS | 10 | Mar 2, 1975 | Japan | Won vacant Japanese middleweight title |
| 5 | Win | 5–0 | Cassius Naito | PTS | 10 | Jul 29, 1974 | Gifu, Japan | |
| 4 | Win | 4–0 | Seiji Nagai | KO | 4 (4) | Dec 27, 1973 | Japan | |
| 3 | Win | 3–0 | Hachiro Kuroishi | KO | 2 (4) | Dec 3, 1973 | Japan | |
| 2 | Win | 2–0 | Keiji Miyawaki | KO | 3 (4) | Sep 30, 1973 | Japan | |
| 1 | Win | 1–0 | Toshio Oki | RTD | 3 (4) | May 18, 1973 | Yokohama, Kanagawa, Japan | |

== See also ==
- List of world light-middleweight boxing champions
- List of Japanese boxing world champions
- Boxing in Japan

Sporting positions
Regional boxing titles
| Vacant Title last held by Steven Smith | Japanese middleweight champion March 2, 1975 – 1978; Vacated | Vacant Title next held by Katsuo Esashi |
World boxing titles
| Preceded by Eddie Gazo | WBA super welterweight champion August 9, 1978 – October 24, 1979 | Succeeded by Ayub Kalule |
| Preceded by Eddie Gazo | The Ring super welterweight champion August 9, 1978 – October 24, 1979 | Succeeded by Ayub Kalule |
