= Patrick Kalambay =

Italian footballer

Personal information
- Date of birth: 6 January 1984 (age 42)
- Place of birth: Ancona, Italy
- Height: 1.77 m (5 ft 10 in)
- Position: Midfielder

Youth career
- Ancona Calcio

Senior career*
| Years | Team | Apps | (Gls) |
| 2001–2002 | Ancona Calcio | 1 | (0) |
| 2002–2010 | Milan | 0 | (0) |
| 2002–2003 | → Ancona Calcio (loan) | 0 | (0) |
| 2004–2005 | → Fermana (loan) | 22 | (1) |
| 2005–2006 | → Lumezzane (loan) | 22 | (2) |
| 2006–2008 | → Triestina (loan) | 13 | (1) |
| 2008 | → A.C. Ancona (loan) | 0 | (0) |
| 2008–2010 | → Como (loan) | 36 | (4) |
| 2010–2011 | U.S. Ancona 1905 | 4 | (1) |
| 2011–2012 | Marino | ? | (?) |
| 2012–2013 | Vibonese | 31 | (2) |
| 2013–2014 | Palestrina | 16 | (1) |
- * Club domestic league appearances and goals

Patrick Kalambay (born 6 January 1984) is an Italian former professional footballer, who plays as a midfielder.

== Club career ==
Kalambay has previously played professionally for several teams, most notably Fermana, Lumezzane, Triestina, Como and Ancona (3 times, Ancona Calcio, A.C. Ancona and U.S. Ancona 1905).

After made his professional debut in 2000–01 Serie B season, Kalambay was signed by A.C. Milan in a direct swap with Daniele Daino in July 2002. Kalambay returned to Ancona for a season long loan, however he did not play any game in 2002–03 Serie B.

=== Amateur career ===
In February 2011 he left for fellow Eccellenza club Marino, from U.S. Ancona 1905, despite the two teams could not against each other in the league, as they were belonged to different geographical groups: Ancona in Marche and Marino in Lazio. However, he also played the match against his former club Ancona in the Coppa Italia Dilettanti. Both team promoted to Serie D, but Marino was promoted as the runner-up. He renewed his contract at the start of 2011–12 Serie D season. In September 2012 he was signed by Vibonese.

== Personal life ==
He is the son of Sumbu Kalambay, an Italian Zaire-born former world champion boxer.
