= Herol Graham =

British boxer

Personal information
- Nickname: Bomber
- Nationality: British
- Born: 13 September 1959 (age 66) Nottingham, Nottinghamshire, England
- Height: 5 ft 11 1/2 in (182 cm)
- Weight: Light-middleweight; Middleweight; Super-middleweight

Boxing career
- Reach: 77 in (196 cm)
- Stance: Southpaw

Boxing record
- Total fights: 54
- Wins: 48
- Win by KO: 28
- Losses: 6
Medal record
Men's amateur boxing
Representing England
English National Championships
Gold medal – first place	1978 London	Middleweight

Herol Graham (born 13 September 1959) is a British former professional boxer who competed from 1978 to 1998. A three-time world title challenger, he is generally acknowledged as one of the best British boxers of the post-war era to have never won a world championship. He beat Champions Lindell Holmes, Ayub Kalule and Vinny Pazienza.

== Amateur career ==
=== Highlights ===
1976 Junior World Welterweight Champion (beat John Mugabi in final)

1977 Senior ABA Light-Middleweight finalist (lost to Steve Hopkin)

1978 Senior ABA Middleweight Champion

== Professional career ==
In 1978, after winning the ABA middleweight title, Graham turned professional, fighting out of Brendan Ingle's gym in the Wincobank area of Sheffield.

Graham went undefeated in his first 38 fights, winning the British, Commonwealth and European light-middleweight titles, as well as the British and European middleweight titles. He eventually lost his unbeaten record defending his European middleweight title against future world champion Sumbu Kalambay in 1987. Graham would go on to fight for world titles twice at middleweight and once at super middleweight. In his first attempt, challenging for the vacant WBA middleweight title, he took Mike McCallum to a close split decision; points deducted for a punch to the back of McCallum's head ended up costing Graham the verdict. A year later, in another world title challenge, he lost to Julian Jackson for the vacant WBC middleweight title. After outclassing Jackson for nearly 4 rounds, Graham was knocked out cold before he hit the canvas by the now-famous devastating right cross known as the 'Punch of the Century'.

Four years of inactivity were followed by an unexpected comeback in which Graham put together a series of victories to gain a last shot at a world title in March 1998. Challenging Charles Brewer for his IBF super middleweight title, Graham was stopped in the tenth round. Following this he retired from the ring and now lives in London, working as a personal trainer and specialising in boxing-based exercises.

In February 2009, Graham's son was injured in what police described as a "targeted shooting" at Westfield, Sheffield.

Graham released his autobiography entitled Bomber: Behind the Laughter in 2011.

Graham has ongoing mental health issues from boxing injuries.

== Personal life ==
Graham's parents are Jamaican.

== Professional boxing record ==
54 fights	48 wins	6 losses
By knockout	28	3
By decision	20	3

No.	Result	Record	Opponent	Type	Round, time	Date	Location	Notes
54	Loss	48–6	Charles Brewer	TKO	10 (12)	28 Mar 1998	Boardwalk Hall, Atlantic City, New Jersey, US	For IBF super-middleweight title
53	Win	48–5	Vinny Pazienza	UD	12	6 Dec 1997	Wembley Arena, London, England	Retained WBC International super-middleweight title
52	Win	47–5	Chris Johnson	TKO	8 (12), 2:40	12 Jul 1997	London Olympia, London, England	Won vacant WBC International super-middleweight title
51	Win	46–5	Craig Joseph	PTS	8	4 Mar 1997	Elephant and Castle Shopping Centre, London, England	
50	Win	45–5	Terry Ford	PTS	8	26 Nov 1996	Concorde Sports Centre, Sheffield, England	
49	Loss	44–5	Frank Grant	TKO	9 (12), 2:20	23 Sep 1992	Elland Road, Leeds, England	Lost British middleweight title
48	Loss	44–4	Sumbu Kalambay	UD	12	12 Mar 1992	Pesaro, Italy	For European middleweight title
47	Win	44–3	John Ashton	TKO	6 (12), 2:34	10 Dec 1991	City Hall, Sheffield, England	Retained British middleweight title
46	Loss	43–3	Julian Jackson	KO	4 (12), 1:13	24 Nov 1990	Torrequebrada Hotel, Benalmádena, Spain	For vacant WBC middleweight title
45	Win	43–2	Ismael Negron	KO	3 (10), 1:37	11 Apr 1990	Leisure Centre, Dewsbury, England	
44	Win	42–2	Rod Douglas	RTD	9 (12)	25 Oct 1989	Wembley Arena, London, England	Retained British middleweight title
43	Loss	41–2	Mike McCallum	SD	12	10 May 1989	Royal Albert Hall, London, England	For vacant WBA middleweight title
42	Win	41–1	Johnny Melfah	TKO	5 (12)	23 Nov 1988	York Hall, London, England	Retained British middleweight title
41	Win	40–1	James Cook	TKO	5 (12)	8 Jun 1988	City Hall, Sheffield, England	Won vacant British middleweight title
40	Win	39–1	Ricky Stackhouse	TKO	8 (10), 0:31	5 Dec 1987	Adwick Leisure Centre, Doncaster, England	
39	Loss	38–1	Sumbu Kalambay	UD	12	26 May 1987	Wembley Arena, London, England	Lost European middleweight title
38	Win	38–0	Charles Boston	TKO	7 (10)	17 Jan 1987	King's Hall, Belfast, Northern Ireland	
37	Win	37–0	Mark Kaylor	RTD	8 (12)	4 Nov 1986	Wembley Arena, London, England	Retained European middleweight title
36	Win	36–0	Ernie Rabotte	TKO	1 (10), 1:54	23 Jun 1986	Caesars Palace, Paradise, Nevada, US	
35	Win	35–0	Ayub Kalule	TKO	10 (12), 2:10	5 Feb 1986	City Hall, Sheffield, England	Won European middleweight title
34	Win	34–0	Sanderline Williams	PTS	10	3 Dec 1985	Ulster Hall, Belfast, Northern Ireland	
33	Win	33–0	Roberto Justino Ruiz	TKO	2 (10), 1:33	16 Oct 1985	Royal Albert Hall, London, England	
32	Win	32–0	Jimmy Price	KO	1 (12)	24 Apr 1985	Britannia Leisure Centre, London, England	Won vacant British middleweight title
31	Win	31–0	Rose Rosemain	KO	5 (10), 1:32	6 Mar 1985	Royal Albert Hall, London, England	
30	Win	30–0	Liam Coleman	TKO	3 (8), 2:01	26 Nov 1984	City Hall, Sheffield, England	
29	Win	29–0	Jose Seys	TKO	6 (10), 1:47	16 Oct 1984	Royal Albert Hall, London, England	
28	Win	28–0	Irving Hines	KO	2 (10)	25 Sep 1984	Wembley Arena, London, England	
27	Win	27–0	Lindell Holmes	TKO	5 (10)	22 Jul 1984	Bramall Lane, Sheffield, England	
26	Win	26–0	Germain Le Maitre	TKO	8 (12)	9 Dec 1983	La Soucoupe, Saint-Nazaire, France	Retained European light-middleweight title
25	Win	25–0	Carlos Betancourt	KO	1 (10)	11 Oct 1983	Royal Albert Hall, London, England	
24	Win	24–0	Clement Tshinza	KO	2 (12), 1:37	23 May 1983	City Hall, Sheffield, England	Won vacant European light-middleweight title
23	Win	23–0	Tony Nelson	RTD	5 (10)	15 Mar 1983	Wembley Arena, London, England	
22	Win	22–0	Hunter Clay	PTS	15	30 Sep 1982	National Stadium, Lagos, Nigeria	Retained Commonwealth light-middleweight title
21	Win	21–0	Fred Coranson	PTS	10	22 Apr 1982	Liverpool Stadium, Liverpool, England	
20	Win	20–0	Chris Christian	TKO	9 (15), 0:57	24 Feb 1982	City Hall, Sheffield, England	Retained British and Commonwealth light-middleweight titles
19	Win	19–0	Kenny Bristol	PTS	15	25 Nov 1981	City Hall, Sheffield, England	Won Commonwealth light-middleweight title
18	Win	18–0	Prince Rodney	TKO	1 (10), 1:16	17 Jun 1981	City Hall, Sheffield, England	
17	Win	17–0	Pat Thomas	PTS	15	24 Mar 1981	City Hall, Sheffield, England	Won British light-middleweight title
16	Win	16–0	Lancelot Innis	PTS	10	22 Jan 1981	Liverpool Stadium, Liverpool, England	
15	Win	15–0	Larry Mayes	TKO	4 (10), 2:56	30 Oct 1980	Liverpool Stadium, Liverpool, England	
14	Win	14–0	Joey Mack	PTS	8	9 Sep 1980	Top Rank Suite, Sheffield, England	
13	Win	13–0	George Danahar	PTS	8	22 Apr 1980	Top Rank Suite, Sheffield, England	
12	Win	12–0	Glen McEwan	PTS	8	12 Feb 1980	Fiesta Nightclub, Sheffield, England	
11	Win	11–0	Errol McKenzie	PTS	8	27 Nov 1979	Top Rank Suite, Sheffield, England	
10	Win	10–0	Billy Ahearne	TKO	3 (8)	27 Oct 1979	Civic Hall, Barnsley, England	
9	Win	9–0	Lloyd James	PTS	8	26 Sep 1979	Top Rank Suite, Sheffield, England	
8	Win	8–0	Gordon George	PTS	8	16 May 1979	Top Rank Suite, Sheffield, England	
7	Win	7–0	Mac Nicholson	PTS	8	27 Apr 1979	Gosforth Park Hotel, Newcastle upon Tyne, England	
6	Win	6–0	George Walker	PTS	8	27 Mar 1979	Cliffs Pavilion, Southend, England	
5	Win	5–0	Dave Southwell	PTS	8	28 Feb 1979	Executive Sporting Club, Burslem, England	
4	Win	4–0	Dave Southwell	PTS	8	12 Feb 1979	Top Rank Suite, Reading, England	
3	Win	3–0	Jimmy Roberts	TKO	2 (6)	22 Jan 1979	Bradford, England	
2	Win	2–0	Curtis Marsh	RTD	1 (6)	4 Dec 1978	Cliffs Pavilion, Southend, England	
1	Win	1–0	Vivian Waite	PTS	6	28 Nov 1978	Top Rank Suite, Sheffield, England	

Sporting positions
Amateur boxing titles
Previous: Robert Davies	ABA middleweight champion 1978	Next: Nicky Wilshire
Regional boxing titles
Preceded by Pat Thomas	British light-middleweight champion 24 March 1981 – May 1983; Vacated	Vacant Title next held by Prince Rodney
Preceded by Kenny Bristol	Commonwealth light-middleweight champion 25 November 1981 – August 1984; Vacated	Vacant Title next held by Ken Salisbury
Vacant Title last held by Luigi Minchillo	European light-middleweight champion 23 May 1983 – May 1984; Vacated	Vacant Title next held by Jimmy Cable
Vacant Title last held by Tony Sibson	British middleweight champion 24 April 1985 – October 1986; Vacated	Vacant Title next held by Brian Anderson
Preceded by Ayub Kalule	European middleweight champion 5 February 1986 – 26 May 1987	Succeeded by Sumbu Kalambay
Vacant Title last held by Tony Sibson	British middleweight champion 8 June 1988 – 23 September 1992	Succeeded by Frank Grant
Vacant Title last held by Jaffa Ballogou	WBC International super-middleweight champion 12 July 1997 – March 1998; Vacated	Vacant Title next held by Éric Lucas
