= René Jacquot =

French boxer (born 1961)

Personal information
- Born: 28 July 1961 (age 65) Toul, France
- Height: 5 ft 8 in (173 cm)
- Weight: Light middleweight

Boxing career
- Reach: 70 in (178 cm)
- Stance: Orthodox

Boxing record
- Total fights: 39
- Wins: 26
- Win by KO: 12
- Losses: 12
- Draws: 1

René Jacquot (French: [ʁəne ʒako]; born 28 July 1961 in Toul, France) is a former professional boxer and world title holder.

== Professional career ==
Jacquot turned professional in 1983 and captured the WBC Light Middleweight Title in 1989 with an upset win over Donald Curry. He lost the belt in his first defence to John Mugabi, via TKO in the first round. In 1990 he challenged WBC Light Middleweight Title holder Terry Norris, but lost a decision. In his final bout, he took on IBF Light Middleweight Title holder Gianfranco Rosi later that year, but again lost a decision.

== Professional boxing record ==
39 fights	26 wins	12 losses
By knockout	12	2
By decision	13	10
By disqualification	1	0
Draws	1	

No.	Result	Record	Opponent	Type	Round, time	Date	Location	Notes
39	Loss	26–12–1	Gianfranco Rosi	UD	12	Nov 30, 1990	Palazzo Dello Sport, Marsala, Italy	For IBF light-middleweight title
38	Loss	26–11–1	Terry Norris	UD	12	Jul 13, 1990	Patinoire d'Annecy, Annecy, France	For WBC light-middleweight title
37	Win	26–10–1	Rocky Berg	TKO	8 (?)	Feb 23, 1990	Nancy, France	
36	Win	25–10–1	Lorenzo Garcia	UD	10	Dec 9, 1989	Toulouse, France	
35	Loss	24–10–1	John Mugabi	TKO	1 (12)	Jul 8, 1989	Mirapolis, Courdimanche, France	Lost WBC light-middleweight title
34	Win	24–9–1	Donald Curry	UD	12	Feb 11, 1989	Palais des Sports, Grenoble, France	Won WBC light-middleweight title
33	Win	23–9–1	Romolo Casamonica	UD	12	Oct 8, 1988	Rome, Italy	Retained European light-middleweight title
32	Win	22–9–1	Erwin Heiber	TKO	11 (12)	Jun 29, 1988	Sporthalle, Wandsbek, Germany	Retained European light-middleweight title
31	Win	21–9–1	Eric Taton	TKO	12 (12)	Apr 9, 1988	Echirolles, France	Retained European light-middleweight title
30	Win	20–9–1	Luigi Minchillo	TKO	4 (12)	Jan 29, 1988	Rimini, Italy	Won vacant European light-middleweight title
29	Win	19–9–1	Miodrag Perunović	TKO	6 (?)	Dec 5, 1987	Salle Louis Simon, Gaillard, France	
28	Win	18–9–1	John Van Elteren	KO	5 (?)	Oct 9, 1987	Morges, Switzerland	
27	Win	17–9–1	Serge Meyers	KO	4 (?)	Oct 3, 1987	Echirolles, France	
26	Win	16–9–1	Joel Brival	PTS	8	Jun 23, 1987	Paris, France	
25	Win	15–9–1	Yvon Segor	TKO	7 (10)	Apr 10, 1987	Echirolles, France	Won French light-middleweight title
24	Win	14–9–1	Jean-Paul Roux	PTS	10	Jan 23, 1987	Echirolles, France	
23	Win	13–9–1	Jean-Yves Piperol	RTD	5 (?)	Dec 6, 1986	Pointe-à-Pitre, Guadeloupe	
22	Loss	12–9–1	Mauro Martelli	PTS	10	Oct 3, 1986	Geneva, Switzerland	
21	Win	12–8–1	Nino La Rocca	DQ	4 (?)	Jun 27, 1986	Modena, Italy	
20	Win	11–8–1	Giovanni Chirra	PTS	8	May 16, 1986	Mulhouse, France	
19	Loss	10–8–1	Yvon Segor	PTS	10	Feb 28, 1986	Pointe-à-Pitre, Guadeloupe	For vacant French light-middleweight title
18	Win	10–7–1	Raphael Salamone	PTS	8	Jan 25, 1986	Grenoble, France	
17	Win	9–7–1	Helier Custos	PTS	8	Dec 6, 1985	Echirolles, France	
16	Win	8–7–1	Hugues Samo	TKO	6 (?)	Oct 26, 1985	Grenoble, France	
15	Loss	7–7–1	Luciano Bruno	PTS	6	Jun 29, 1985	Bellaria – Igea Marina, Italy	
14	Loss	7–6–1	Andrea Scardigli	PTS	6	Jun 7, 1985	Scandicci, Italy	
13	Loss	7–5–1	Abdelkader Souihi	RTD	5 (?)	Mar 22, 1985	Salle Leyrit, Nice, France	
12	Win	7–4–1	Salvatore Pisani	PTS	6	Jan 5, 1985	Voiron, France	
11	Win	6–4–1	Angelo Liquori	TKO	6 (?)	Dec 22, 1984	Muggiò, Italy	
10	Loss	5–4–1	Felix Di Ciocco	PTS	6	Nov 30, 1984	Grenoble, France	
9	Win	5–3–1	Thierry Pierluigi	TKO	4 (6)	Oct 26, 1984	Echirolles, France	
8	Loss	4–3–1	Alphonse Matoubela	PTS	6	Apr 28, 1984	Saint-Malo, France	
7	Loss	4–2–1	Jean-Victor Santoncini	PTS	6	Feb 27, 1984	Paris, France	
6	Win	4–1–1	Jean-Pierre Calvez	PTS	6	Feb 20, 1984	Paris, France	
5	Win	3–1–1	Patrick Grisot	PTS	6	Feb 10, 1984	Paris, France	
4	Loss	2–1–1	Stephane Walter	PTS	6	Jan 7, 1984	Besançon, France	
3	Draw	2–0–1	Richard Bankeu	PTS	6	Oct 3, 1983	Strasbourg, France	
2	Win	2–0	Mokhtar Bekheira	PTS	6	Mar 26, 1983	Moirans, France	
1	Win	1–0	Richard Bankeu	PTS	6	Feb 25, 1983	Nancy, France	

== See also ==
- List of male boxers
- List of world light-middleweight boxing champions

Sporting positions
Regional boxing titles
Preceded by Yvon Segor	French light-middleweight champion 10 April 1987 – 1988; Vacated	Vacant Title next held by Gilbert Delé
Vacant Title last held by Gianfranco Rosi	European light-middleweight champion 29 January 1988 – 11 February 1989; Won world title	Vacant Title next held by Edip Sekowitsch
World boxing titles
Preceded by Donald Curry	WBC light-middleweight champion 11 February 1989 – 8 July 1989	Succeeded by John Mugabi
Awards
Previous: Iran Barkley TKO 3 Thomas Hearns	The Ring Upset of the Year; W 12 Donald Curry; 1989	Next: Buster Douglas KO 10; Mike Tyson
