= Sumbu Kalambay =

Italian boxer

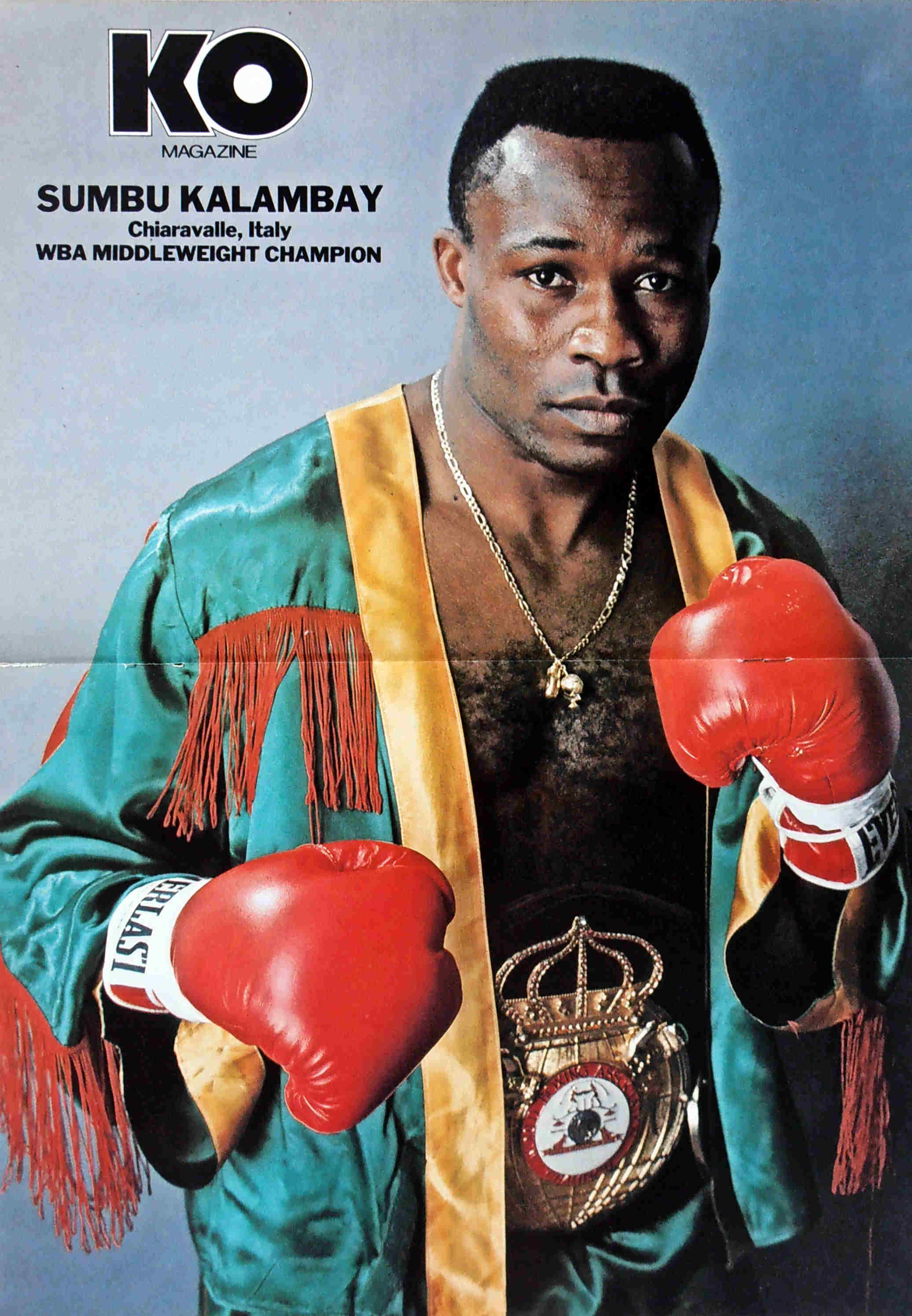
- Kalambay in 1988

Personal information
- Nickname: Patrizio/Ali
- Nationality: Italian
- Born: 10 April 1956 (age 70) Élisabethville, Belgian Congo
- Height: 5 ft 9 in (175 cm)
- Weight: Middleweight

Boxing career
- Reach: 72 in (183 cm)
- Stance: Orthodox

Boxing record
- Total fights: 64
- Wins: 57
- Win by KO: 33
- Losses: 6
- Draws: 1

Patrizio Sumbu Kalambay (born 10 April 1956) is a Congolese-Italian former professional boxer. A world champion and two-time title challenger, he held the WBA world middleweight title from 1987 until 1988.

== Personal life ==
Kalambay was born in the Belgian Congo. He moved to Italy during his youth, settling in Chiaravalle, in the Marche region, where he learned boxing and still resides. He changed his name to Patrizio as a tribute to fellow Italian boxer Patrizio Oliva.

== Professional career ==
After compiling an amateur record of 90 wins and 5 losses, Kalambay turned professional in 1980. In 1985, he was outpointed over ten rounds by Duane Thomas in Atlantic City, New Jersey, United States. Kalambay won the Italian middleweight title by defeating Giovanni De Marco by split decision, then lost to former WBA light middleweight champion Ayub Kalule by split decision over twelve rounds for the European middleweight title.

In May 1987 at The Arena, Wembley, London, Kalambay won the European middleweight title by outpointing Herol Graham, who was 38-0 and ranked #1 in the world.

In his next fight, Kalambay defeated future three-weight world champion Iran Barkley by unanimous decision over fifteen rounds to win the vacant WBA middleweight title. He made three successful title defenses, including an upset unanimous decision win over Mike McCallum, the undefeated former WBA light middleweight champion.

In March 1989, at the Hilton Hotel, Las Vegas, Nevada, United States, he boxed undefeated IBF middleweight champion Michael Nunn, being stripped of the WBA belt prior to the bout. Surprisingly, Kalambay was knocked out in the first round with one punch. It was the only knock out loss of his career.

In 1990, Kalambay regained the European title by defeating Francesco Dell'Aquila, and defended it against Frederic Seillier, both via ninth round stoppages. In 1991, Kalambay had a rematch with McCallum in an attempt to regain the WBA middleweight title, which McCallum won by a close split decision.

Kalambay made four more successful defenses of the European title in Italy, including a rematch win over Herol Graham, and a points victory over future two-weight world champion Steve Collins.

In May 1993, at Granby Halls, Leicester, East Midlands, England, Kalambay lost by unanimous decision to Chris Pyatt in a challenge for the vacant WBO middleweight title.

At 37, Kalambay retired with a record of 57-6-1 (33 KOs). He then worked as a boxing trainer, coaching, among others, Paolo Vidoz and Michele Piccirillo.

== Professional boxing record ==
64 fights	57 wins	6 losses
By knockout	33	1
By decision	23	5
By disqualification	1	0
Draws	1	

No.	Result	Record	Opponent	Type	Round, time	Date	Location	Notes
64	Loss	57–6–1	Chris Pyatt	UD	12	May 19, 1993	Granby Halls, Leicester, England, U.K.	For vacant WBO middleweight title
63	Win	57–5–1	Eddie Evans	KO	1 (8)	Apr 14, 1993	PalaEur, Rome, Italy	
62	Win	56–5–1	Steve Collins	PTS	12	Oct 22, 1992	Verbania, Italy	Retained European middleweight title
61	Win	55–5–1	Paul Wesley	PTS	10	Jun 6, 1992	Salice Terme, Italy	
60	Win	54–5–1	Herol Graham	UD	12	Mar 12, 1992	Pesaro, Italy	Retained European middleweight title
59	Win	53–5–1	Miodrag Perunović	TKO	4 (12)	Nov 14, 1991	Palazzo dello Sport, Ancona, Italy	Retained European middleweight title
58	Win	52–5–1	John Ashton	RTD	6 (12)	Aug 24, 1991	Pesaro, Italy	Retained European middleweight title
57	Loss	51–5–1	Mike McCallum	SD	12	Apr 1, 1991	Stade Louis II, Fontvieille, Monaco	For WBA middleweight title
56	Win	51–4–1	Miguel Angel Maldonado	PTS	8	Nov 24, 1990	Velletri, Italy	
55	Win	50–4–1	Frederic Seillier	TKO	9 (12)	Jul 8, 1990	Parc des Lices, Toulon, France	Retained European middleweight title
54	Win	49–4–1	Francesco Dell'Aquila	TKO	9 (12)	Jan 24, 1990	Campobello di Mazara, Italy	Won European middleweight title
53	Win	48–4–1	Reggie Miller	RTD	1 (8)	Nov 29, 1989	Pesaro, Italy	
52	Win	47–4–1	Tony Powell	KO	5 (?)	Oct 7, 1989	Pesaro, Italy	
51	Loss	46–4–1	Michael Nunn	KO	1 (12)	Mar 25, 1989	Hilton Hotel, Winchester, Nevada, U.S.	Lost The Ring middleweight title For IBF middleweight titles
50	Win	46–3–1	Doug DeWitt	TKO	7 (15)	Nov 8, 1988	Stade Louis II, Fontvieille, Monaco	Retained WBA and The Ring middleweight titles
49	Win	45–3–1	Robbie Sims	UD	12	Jun 12, 1988	Palazzo Dello Sport, Ravenna, Italy	Retained WBA and The Ring middleweight titles
48	Win	44–3–1	Mike McCallum	UD	12	Mar 5, 1988	Palazzo Dello Sport, Pesaro, Italy	Retained WBA middleweight title
47	Win	43–3–1	Iran Barkley	UD	15	Oct 23, 1987	Palazzo Dello Sport, Livorno, Italy	Won vacant WBA middleweight title
46	Win	42–3–1	Herol Graham	UD	12	May 26, 1987	Wembley Arena, Wembley, England, U.K.	Won European middleweight title
45	Win	41–3–1	Basante Blanco	RTD	5 (?)	Mar 21, 1987	Ischia, Italy	
44	Win	40–3–1	Cecil Pettigrew	PTS	8	Dec 13, 1986	Ragusa, Italy	
43	Win	39–3–1	Giovanni De Marco	RTD	11 (12)	Sep 4, 1986	Silvi, Italy	Retained Italian middleweight title
42	Win	38–3–1	Cliff Gilpin	PTS	8	Mar 15, 1986	Stade Louis II, Fontvieille, Monaco	
41	Loss	37–3–1	Ayub Kalule	SD	12	Dec 19, 1985	Palazzo dello Sport, Ancona, Italy	For European middleweight title
40	Win	37–2–1	Giovanni De Marco	SD	12	sep 26, 1985	Caserta, Italy	Won Italian middleweight title
39	Win	36–2–1	Donald Bowers	PTS	8	Jul 14, 1985	Stade Louis II, Fontvieille, Monaco	
38	Win	35–2–1	Jose Duarte	PTS	10	Apr 27, 1985	Avellino, Italy	
37	Loss	34–2–1	Duane Thomas	PTS	10	Apr 6, 1985	Ballys Park Place Hotel Casino, Atlantic City, New Jersey, U.S.	
36	Win	34–1–1	Tony Harrison	TKO	4 (?)	Mar 8, 1985	Piagge, Italy	
35	Win	33–1–1	Clint Jackson	PTS	8	Dec 10, 1984	Palais Omnisport de Paris-Bercy, Paris, France	
34	Win	32–1–1	Tony Cerda	PTS	8	Sep 22, 1984	Chapiteau de l'Espace, Fontvieille, Monaco	
33	Win	31–1–1	Bobby Hoye	PTS	8	Jul 8, 1984	Perugia, Italy	
32	Win	30–1–1	Allen Alexander	PTS	8	Apr 13, 1984	Pesaro, Italy	
31	Win	29–1–1	Kenneth Styles	TKO	2 (?)	Feb 18, 1984	Capo d'Orlando, Italy	
30	Win	28–1–1	Irving Hines	KO	8 (?)	Dec 9, 1983	Fano, Italy	
29	Win	27–1–1	Ralph Moncrief	PTS	8	Oct 30, 1983	Sanremo, Italy	
28	Win	26–1–1	James Williams	KO	1 (?)	Oct 13, 1983	Pesaro, Italy	
27	Win	25–1–1	Guy Kennedy	TKO	6 (8)	Sep 3, 1983	Stadio Municipale, Marsala, Italy	
26	Win	24–1–1	Jimmie Sykes	PTS	8	Jul 24, 1983	PalaEur, Rome, Italy	
25	Win	23–1–1	Wilson Bell	KO	1 (?)	Apr 10, 1983	Sanremo, Italy	
24	Win	22–1–1	Bruce Johnson	TKO	6 (?)	Feb 24, 1983	Bologna, Italy	
23	Win	21–1–1	Stacy McSwain	TKO	3 (?)	Dec 22, 1982	Saint-Vincent, Aosta Valley, Italy	
22	Win	20–1–1	Salvador Perez Ramos	KO	2 (?)	Dec 10, 1982	Pesaro, Italy	
21	Win	19–1–1	Buster Drayton	PTS	8	Oct 30, 1982	Teatro Ariston, Sanremo, Italy	
20	Win	18–1–1	Joe Ouru	DQ	1 (?)	Sep 1, 1982	Forio d'Ischia, Italy	
19	Win	17–1–1	Jose Quinones	TKO	2 (?)	May 29, 1982	Milan, Italy	
18	Win	16–1–1	Costello King	KO	2 (?)	Apr 2, 1982	Milan, Italy	
17	Win	15–1–1	Steve Williams	TKO	2 (?)	Feb 5, 1982	Bologna, Italy	
16	Win	14–1–1	Gabriele Lazzari	TKO	6 (?)	Dec 26, 1981	Bologna, Italy	
15	Win	13–1–1	Jose Lozano	PTS	8	Dec 11, 1981	Milan, Italy	
14	Win	12–1–1	Michel Pagani	KO	2 (?)	Nov 13, 1981	Rome, Italy	
13	Win	11–1–1	Sonny Kamunga	KO	7 (?)	Oct 23, 1981	Pesaro, Italy	
12	Win	10–1–1	Jose Luis Duran	TKO	4 (?)	Sep 25, 1981	Pesaro, Italy	
11	Win	9–1–1	Christian D'Helft	TKO	3 (?)	Jun 27, 1981	Pesaro, Italy	
10	Win	8–1–1	Giovanni Martorina	TKO	1 (?)	May 28, 1981	Milan, Italy	
9	Win	7–1–1	Christian D'Helft	TKO	1 (?)	May 15, 1981	Pesaro, Italy	
8	Win	6–1–1	Damiano Lassandro	TKO	8 (8)	Apr 17, 1981	Pesaro, Italy	
7	Win	5–1–1	Giovanni Martorina	PTS	6	Mar 20, 1981	Ancona, Italy	
6	Win	4–1–1	Cosimo Carbone	TKO	3 (?)	Mar 9, 1981	Rome, Italy	
5	Win	3–1–1	Christian D'Helft	PTS	8	Feb 5, 1981	Paris, France	
4	Draw	2–1–1	Stephane Ferrara	PTS	6	Jan 8, 1981	Paris, France	
3	Loss	2–1	Aldo Buzzetti	PTS	8	Dec 5, 1980	Piacenza, Italy	
2	Win	2–0	Luigi Marini	TKO	6 (?)	Oct 24, 1980	Ancona, Italy	
1	Win	1–0	Esperno Postl	TKO	7 (8)	Oct 10, 1980	Wolkersdorf, Austria	

== Career after boxing ==
Sumbu Kalambay is currently the trainer of boxers Paolo Vidoz, Michele Piccirillo and Carel Sandon.

== Family ==
He is the father of Patrick Kalambay, an Italian football midfielder.

== See also ==
- List of world middleweight boxing champions

== Bibliography ==
- Gabriele Tinti, Sumbu Kalambay,Con l'Africa dentro, Milan, Mimesis, 2010. ISBN 978-88-575-0124-6

Sporting positions
Regional boxing titles
Preceded by Herol Graham	EBU middleweight champion 26 May – 23 October 1987; Won WBA title	Vacant Title next held by Pierre Joly
Preceded by Francesco Dell'Aquila	EBU middleweight champion 24 January 1990 – 1992; Vacated	Vacant Title next held by Agostino Cardamone
World boxing titles
Vacant Title last held by Marvin Hagler	WBA middleweight champion 23 October 1987 – March 1989; Stripped	Vacant Title next held by Mike McCallum
Vacant Title last held by Sugar Ray Leonard	The Ring middleweight champion 6 July 1988 – 25 March 1989	Succeeded by Michael Nunn
