= Roger Leonard =

American boxer (b. 1953)

Roger Leonard (born July 21, 1953) is a retired professional boxer from Palmer Park, Maryland. He is the older brother of boxing legend Sugar Ray Leonard, whom he introduced to boxing.

== Career ==
=== Amateur career ===
Nicknamed "The Dodger," Leonard had over 100 amateur bouts. He won four United States Air Force Championships and the 1978 National AAU Welterweight Championship, beating rival Clint Jackson. While in the Air Force, he was teammates with another Palmer Park native, Henry Bunch.

=== Professional career ===
Leonard turned professional in 1978. He regularly fought on the undercards of his famous younger brother, including when Sugar Ray fought Wilfred Benítez and Roberto Durán.

Leonard was 15-0 and ranked second in the world as a junior middleweight when he was stopped in ten rounds by Mario Maldonado in February 1981. He retired after winning an eight-round decision against Herbie Wilens in March 1982. His professional record was 16-1 with 7 knockouts.
