= Dwight Muhammad Qawi vs. Evander Holyfield =

Boxing competition

Pandemonium
- Date: July 12, 1986
- Venue: Omni Coliseum, Atlanta, Georgia
- Title(s) on the line: WBA Junior Heavyweight Championship

Tale of the tape
Boxer	(United States) Dwight Muhammad Qawi	(United States) Evander Holyfield
Nickname	"Camden Buzzsaw"	"The Real Deal"
Hometown	Lindenwold, New Jersey	Atlanta, Georgia
Pre-fight record	26–2–1 (15 KO)	11–0 (8 KO)
Age	33 years, 6 months	23 years, 8 months
Height	5 ft 6 in (168 cm)	6 ft 2 1/2 in (189 cm)
Weight	190 lb (86 kg)	186 lb (84 kg)
Style	Orthodox	Orthodox
Recognition	WBA; Junior Heavyweight Champion	WBA; No. 1 Ranked Junior Heavyweight

Result
- Holyfield defeated Muhammad Qawi via Split Decision

Dwight Muhammad Qawi vs. Evander Holyfield, billed as "Pandemonium" was a professional boxing match contested on 12 July 1986 for the WBA Junior Heavyweight championship.

== Background ==
After his defeat by Michael Spinks in March 1983 in a bout for the Undisputed Light Heavyweight Championship, Dwight Muhammad Qawi had been set for a rematch with Spinks in September 1984; however, Qawi was injured three weeks before the fight and had to pull out. He then decided to move up to the new Cruiserweight division and in July 1985 he knocked out Piet Crous to win the WBA cruiserweight title. After making one successful defence against former Undisputed Heavyweight Champion Leon Spinks (brother of Michael) he agreed to face Holyfield.

1984 Olympic bronze medalist Evander Holyfield began his pro career fighting in the Light Heavyweight division before setting himself the goal of unifying the Cruiserweight division as a prelude to becoming a Heavyweight. He was attempting to become the first boxer from the 1984 Olympic boxing team to win a world title.

== The fight ==
There were no knockdowns, but the fight was close and competitive with Holyfield outworking and outlanding Qawi. Two judges, Harold Lederman and Neffie Quintana scored the bout for Holyfield 144–140 & 147–138, while the third judge Gordon Volkman scored it for Qawi 143–141 giving Holyfield a split decision victory and his first world title The bout would be named as the best cruiserweight fight of the 1980s by Ring Magazine as well as "One of the last great fifteen round title bouts".

The fight, which is considered by Ring Magazine as the best Cruiserweight fight of all time, was so tough for Holyfield that he declared to the same magazine, years later, that he was about to quit during it.

== Aftermath ==
Holyfield would go unify the WBA & IBF titles by knocking out Rickey Parkey in three rounds before easily beating Muhammad Qawi in a rematch in December 1987. He would then become the first Undisputed Cruiserweight Champion by stopping Carlos de León the following April and quickly moved up to heavyweight.

Qawi would spend most of the rest of his career as a cruiserweight and would have one more unsuccessful bid to reclaim a world title finally retiring in 1999.

== Undercard ==
Confirmed bouts:

== Broadcasting ==
Country	Broadcaster
Mexico	Televisa
Philippines	PTV 4
United Kingdom	ITV
United States	ABC

ABC aired the event live as part of ABC's Wide World of Sports, with Al Trautwig and Alex Wallau on the call.

Preceded by vs. Leon Spinks	Dwight Muhammad Qawi's bouts 12 July 1986	Succeeded by vs. Narcisco Maldonado
Preceded by vs. Terry Mims	Evander Holyfield's bouts 12 July 1986	Succeeded by vs. Mike Brothers
