= George Foreman vs. Dwight Muhammad Qawi =

Boxing match

Battle of the Champions
- Date: March 19, 1988
- Venue: Caesars Palace, Paradise, Nevada, U.S.

Tale of the tape
Boxer	George Foreman	Dwight Muhammad Qawi
Nickname	Big	The Camden Buzzsaw
Hometown	Houston, Texas, U.S.	Camden, New Jersey, U.S.
Purse	$100,000	$50,000
Pre-fight record	52–2 (49 KO)	28–5–1 (17 KO)
Age	39 years, 2 months	35 years, 2 months
Height	6 ft 4 in (193 cm)	5 ft 7 in (170 cm)
Weight	235 lb (107 kg)	222 lb (101 kg)
Style	Orthodox	Orthodox
Recognition	Former Undisputed Champion	WBA; No. 7 Ranked Cruiserweight; 2-division world champion

Result
- Foreman wins via 7th-round technical knockout

George Foreman vs. Dwight Muhammad Qawi, billed as the Battle of the Champions, was a professional boxing match contested on March 19, 1988.

== Background ==
The fight between George Foreman, who was a perfect 7–0 since making his comeback the previous year with all seven wins coming by way of knockout, and Dwight Muhammad Qawi, who was returning to the ring for the first time since losing to unified cruiserweight champion Evander Holyfield in December, was made official in mid-February 1988 less than two weeks after Foreman had defeated Guido Trane in his latest comeback bout.

Originally, Foreman had been scheduled to face towering Swedish heavyweight contender Anders Eklund, but Foreman refused to face the 6'6 Eklund, preferring a smaller, more aggressive fighter. Given a choice of Qawi, or little known heavyweights Tony Fulilangi and Rufas Hadley, Foreman chose Qawi. Foreman explained he chose Qawi due in large part to Qawi's similar height and style to then-undisputed heavyweight champion Mike Tyson, who Foreman was hoping to one day face, stating "I'm doing this for one reason: I want to beat Mike Tyson and to do that I must face opponents similar to him."

Having fought seven unknown journeymen since making his comeback, Qawi, a former world champion in both the light heavyweight and cruiserweight divisions, presented a step up in class for Foreman. However, the now 35-year old Qawi was thought to be past his prime, was giving up eight inches in height and had only had one heavyweight fight before in which he weighed in at 207 pounds, substantially less than what Foreman fought at. Promoter Bob Arum nevertheless championed Qawi as Forman's biggest challenge yet stating "Qawi is the first name fighter he has fought. I'm not saying Qawi is a top fighter now, but he's not a journeyman like Sekorski or Trane."

== Fight Details ==
Despite the massive size difference, Qawi was able to hold his own with the much larger Foreman, and landed several big shots during the early portion of the found. A less-than-sharp Foreman trudged forward and threw often but struggled to land anything substantial early on as Qawi avoided most of Foreman's big punches. Foreman sent Qawi down about 40 seconds into the third round after landing an illegal blow to Qawi's kidney for which referee Carlos Padilla Jr. issued a warning.

Foreman did enough to hold a narrow lead going into the seventh round and had worn a now-exhausted Qawi down over the round as he landed several big shots. At 1:51, after being hit by a Foreman combination, Qawi turned and walked away, indicating that he no longer wanted to continue after which Padilla stopped the fight and Foreman was named the winner by technical knockout.

== Aftermath ==
Foreman, who had ended all seven of his previous inside of five rounds, explained his rather lackluster effort as being the product of wanting to fight a longer fight to prove he had the stamina to do so stating "I decided to forget about those one- and two-round knockouts. You’ve already seen me do that. People said I have no stamina. I wanted to show I did." Qawi would state about his decision to stop the fight "I did my best but I had nothing left. I really didn’t. I know I didn’t. My heart said to continue, but I got hit flush. I was tired."

== Fight card ==
Confirmed bouts:

Weight Class	Weight		vs.		Method	Round	Notes
Heavyweight	200+ lbs.	George Foreman	def.	Dwight Muhammad Qawi	TKO	7/10
Middleweight	160 lbs.	Michael Nunn (c)	def.	Curtis Parker	KO	2/12	^{note 1}
Heavyweight	200+ lbs.	Orlin Norris (c)	def.	Renaldo Snipes	UD	12/12	^{note 2}
Cruiserweight	190 lbs.	Bert Cooper (c)	def.	Tony Fulilangi	TKO	4/12	^{note 3}

^Note 1 For NABF Middleweight Title
^Note 2 For NABF Heavyweight Title
^Note 3 For NABF Cruiserweight Title

== Broadcasting ==
Country	Broadcaster
United Kingdom	ITV
United States	Top Rank Pay-Per-View

Preceded by vs. Guido Trane	George Foreman's bouts 19 March 1988	Succeeded by vs. Frank Lux
Preceded by vs. Evander Holyfield II	Dwight Muhammad Qawi's bouts 19 March 1988	Succeeded by vs. Olian Alexander
