= Evander Holyfield vs. Dwight Muhammad Qawi II =

Boxing match

- Date: December 5, 1987
- Venue: Convention Hall, Atlantic City, New Jersey, U.S.
- Title(s) on the line: IBF cruiserweight titles

Tale of the tape
Boxer	Evander Holyfield	Dwight Muhammad Qawi
Nickname	The Real Deal	The Camden Buzzsaw
Hometown	Atlanta, Georgia, U.S.	Camden, New Jersey, U.S.
Pre-fight record	16–0 (12 KO)	28–4–1 (17 KO)
Age	25 years, 1 month	34 years, 11 months
Height	6 ft 1 in (185 cm)	5 ft 7 in (170 cm)
Weight	187 lb (85 kg)	190 lb (86 kg)
Style	Orthodox	Orthodox
Recognition	WBA and IBF; Cruiserweight Champion	WBA/IBF; No. 1 Ranked Cruiserweight

Result
- Holyfield defeated Qawi via 4th round KO

Evander Holyfield vs. Dwight Muhammad Qawi II was a professional boxing match contested on December 5, 1987 for the WBA and IBF cruiserweight titles.

== Background ==
On August 15, 1987, Evander Holyfield would make the third successful defense of his WBA cruiserweight title and first of the IBF version by defeating Ossie Ocasio via 11th-round knockout, while on the undercard Dwight Muhammad Qawi would knockout former cruiserweight champion Lee Roy Murphy to earn the IBF's number one ranking, setting up a rematch from the previous year between the two. In their previous meeting, Qawi and Holyfield would go the distance with Holyfield earning a close split decision victory and becoming the new WBA cruiserweight champion. Qawi would then get an opportunity at rematch, facing Ossie Ocasio in an IBF "eliminator" bout with the winner facing the winner of the Holyfield–Parkey unification fight (which Holyfield would win via TKO in the third round), but he would lose a controversial majority decision and Ocasio would get a shot at Holyfield instead. However, due to the controversial nature of the loss, the IBF gave Qawi another chance at a title shot and he was matched up with Lee Roy Murphy with the winner earning the next shot at Holyfield, provided he defeat Ocasio after the Qawi–Murphy bout. After Qawi and Holyfield earned TKO victories, the rematch was set.

It would be one of the last 15-round title bouts to be sanctioned. The WBA did not sanction the fight, hence if Qawi won, the WBA title was to be declared vacant.

== The fight ==
In contrast to their previous fight, Holyfield would defeat Qawi in the fourth round by technical knockout. With almost a minute left in the round, Holyfield dropped Qawi on the seat of his trunks, though Qawi quickly got back up and continued the fight. Qawi attempted to fight back, but after missing a right hook, Holyfield countered with a right hand of his own that caught Qawi flush and sent him down again. Qawi was unable to answer the 10-count, giving Holyfield the victory by knockout at 2:30 of the round.

== Aftermath ==
At a post match news conference afterward, Qawi's adviser Rock Newman announced that he was retiring, saying "Dwight said that his legs were not there tonight, that Holyfield is a very, very good champion, and that he was even stronger than Dwight thought he would be."

== Fight card ==
Confirmed bouts:

Weight Class	Weight		vs.		Method	Round	Time	Notes
Cruiserweight	190 lb	Evander Holyfield (c)	def.	Dwight Muhammad Qawi	KO	4/15		^{Note 1}
Welterweight	147 lb	Mark Breland	def.	Javier Suazo	UD	10/10
Light middleweight	154 lb	Darrin Van Horn	def.	Joe Summers	UD	10/10
Middleweight	160 lb	Reggie Johnson	def	Sidney Outlaw	UD	6/6

^Note 1 For WBA and IBF Cruiserweight titles.

== Broadcasting ==
Country	Broadcaster
United States	Showtime

Preceded by vs. Ossie Ocasio	Evander Holyfield's bouts 5 December 1987	Succeeded by vs. Carlos De León
Preceded by vs. Lee Roy Murphy	Dwight Muhammad Qawi's bouts 5 December 1987	Succeeded by vs. George Foreman
