= Izzy Slapawitz =

American professional wrestler (1948–2019)

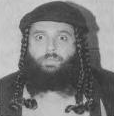

Personal information
- Born: Jeff Smith; December 14, 1948 Brooklyn, New York, United States
- Died: December 28, 2019 (aged 71)

Professional wrestling career
- Ring name(s): Izzy Slapawitz; Izzy Slapowitz; Ilya Zimmervich; Pretty Smitty from NYC
- Billed height: 5 ft 11 in (1.80 m)
- Billed weight: 235 lb (107 kg)
- Trained by: Rick Conner; Frankie Caine
- Debut: 1976
- Retired: 1992

Jeff Smith (December 14, 1948 – December 28, 2019), better known as Izzy Slapawitz, was an American professional wrestler, manager and color commentator, best known for his time with International Championship Wrestling.

From 1978 to 1982, Smith led the Slapowitz Syndicate in the NWA's Mid-South and Knoxville territories as well as many "outlaw" promotions in the Southern United States. He also had brief stints in Georgia Championship Wrestling, Jim Crockett Promotions, Maple Leaf Wrestling, and the World Wrestling Federation. At various times his stable included Barry O, Bob Orton, Jr., Boris Malenko, Crusher Broomfield, James "Sugar Bear" Harris, The Mongolian Stomper, Randy Savage, Ray Candy, Rip Rogers and The Devil's Duo (Doug Vines and Jeff Sword).

== Early life ==
Smith was born and raised in Brooklyn, New York. He became a wrestling fan in the late 1950s. A childhood friend claimed that they were the first wrestling fans to bring signs to local World Wide Wrestling Federation house shows. Around 1971, Smith also co-founded an unofficial fan club for Freddie Blassie with members wearing homemade "Blassie's Army" T-shirts. In his early 20s Smith had an altercation with Kevin Sullivan while attending a live event at Sunnyside Gardens. Sullivan had been hit with an unknown object at the end of his bout against Davey O'Hannon. Smith, who often cheered for the "heel" wrestlers, had been heckling Sullivan (then a "babyface") throughout the night causing the wrestler to believe that Smith was responsible. The young wrestling fan was brought to the dressing room by building security after the match where he was confronted by Sullivan, Gorilla Monsoon and Arnold Skaaland. Smith denied any wrongdoing and was allowed to leave. Smith continued watching wrestling after moving to Knoxville, Tennessee in the mid-1970s. He eventually met Norvell Austin at a Southeastern Championship Wrestling. Austin later introduced Smith to Rick Conner who agreed to train him.

== Professional wrestling career ==
=== Early career ===
Smith made his pro debut in 1976. He spent the next two years wrestling for "outlaw" promotions as "Pretty Smitty from New York City" in Georgia, Kentucky, Tennessee and Virginia. One of his earliest matches was a battle royal in which all the participants wore masks. Smith had never been in such an event and, after being thrown over the top rope, broke his leg in three places. He was pelted with Coke cans and other items by unruly fans while paramedics loaded him into the ambulance. The crowd's reaction convinced him to perform as a "heel" for the majority of his career. On September 16, 1978, Smith (substituting for Tamaya Soto) wrestled Burr Head Jones for an NWA Mid-America television taping at the Memorial Auditorium in Chattanooga, Tennessee. He later felt the match was "garbage". Smith attributed his poor performance to nervousness as he was used to wrestling in front of much smaller crowds. After the match, Smith was berated by promoter Nick Gulas in front of the entire locker room. Although Gulas' booker Tom Renesto reassured Smith that he was welcome to return, Smith felt Gulas had acted unprofessionally and refused to work for him again.

=== American Wrestling Association ===
Not long after, Smith was brought into George and Gil Culkin's American Wrestling Association-affiliated promotion in Mississippi: AWA International Championship Wrestling. Smith's old trainer Rick Conner recommended him to then booker Frankie Caine praising his interview skills. Caine decided to use Smith as a manager believing he had potential as an on-screen character. Smith credited Caine for creating the Izzy Slapawitz character and working with him to further develop the gimmick. Slapawitz was initially presented as a shady New York City businessman who owned a chain of pawn shops throughout the city. In first television appearance, however, Southern audiences mistook "pawn shop" for "porn shop" due Smith's thick New York accent. His introduction elicited some mild controversy at the time and that aspect of the character was quickly dropped. In spite of this rough start, Smith was well liked by Caine and the Culkins. He formed the first version of the Slapawitz Syndicate with Rip Rogers and The Japanese Wrecking Crew (Oki Shikina and Mr. Fuji). One of the first targets of the Slapawitz Syndicate was Joey Rossi who was harassed by the group, and Smith in particular, for several weeks while the Culkins were running shows in Vicksburg, Mississippi. Smith was unexpectedly forced into a bout with Rossi which led to the manager wrestling his first-ever match in the territory. Unlike the typical "cowardly" wrestling manager, Smith aggressively brawled with Rossi and was disqualified in their best two of three falls match. The bout was covered by the Vicksburg's daily newspaper with a front-page story entitled "Tougher Then They Thought".

Shikina and Fugi quickly captured the promotion's Mississippi and U.S. Heavyweight Championships under Slapawitz's leadership. Smith's stable soon became involved in a "heel vs. heel" feud against Percy Pringle and AWA Tag Team Champions The Mongolians (Tio and Tapu). Slapawitz and Pringle faced each other in six-man tag team matches as well as in a variety of specialty matches throughout Mississippi in 1978. One of their most infamous matches was a bloody Texas Bull Rope match at the Mississippi Coliseum in Jackson, Mississippi that ended in a double-countout when the brawl spilled outside of the ring and into the backstage area. The feud concluded the following week at the Mississippi Coliseum with Slapawitz and The Japanese Wrecking Crew defeating Pringle and The Mongolians in a "Loser Leaves Town" Steel Cage match; due to the pre-match stipulations, the Slapawitz Syndicate won all four titles in addition to $5,000. Slapawitz remained with the promotion until the Culkins rejoined Bill Watts at the end of 1979. Smith praised the Culkins for their honesty calling them "two of the finest promoters, in my experience, that ever promoted wrestling matches in the United States". Although Smith had never worked for Mid-South Wrestling, Watts compared "Izzy Slapawitz" to Paul E. Dangerously when the two first met in World Championship Wrestling.

=== NWA Tri-State ===
After leaving Mississippi, Smith followed Frankie Caine to the NWA's Oklahoma territory where he managed Oki Shikina and James "Sugar Bear" Harris. Then NWA Tri-State promoter Leroy McGuirk felt that the "Izzy Slapawitz" name might offend the large Jewish American population in Tulsa and changed it to Ilya Zinervitch. When Caine left the promotion after a falling out with McGuirk, Skandor Akbar replaced him as booker. Akbar believed that the territory could only support one "heel" manager, however, he offered to put Smith under a hood so he could wrestle as a masked wrestler. Smith turned him down as had been on the road for a considerable length of time and wanted to return to Knoxville so he could spend more time with his family. Smith and Harris left the territory after losing a "loser leaves town" match to Jimmy Garvin in Little Rock, Arkansas.

=== All-Star Championship Wrestling ===
Smith joined a local "outlaw" promotion called All-Star Championship Wrestling soon after returning to Knoxville. The organization was formed by Ronnie Garvin, Bob Roop, Bob Orton, Jr. and Boris Malenko after leaving Southeastern Championship Wrestling and was running in opposition to NWA promoter Robert Fuller. Yasu Fuji, one of his former charges, encouraged Smith to contact then booker Ronnie Garvin. Although the territory was struggling in its promotional war against Fuller, Garvin agreed to hire him. In January 1980, Smith made his first television appearance scouting for new talent. Initially managing Bob Orton, Jr. and Barry O, this new version of the Slapawitz Syndicate included Boris Malenko, Randy Savage, Rip Rogers, and Tony Peters. Peters quickly won the ICW Southeastern Heavyweight Championship under his management.

Smith led his stable against Ronnie Garvin, Bob Roop and other fan favorites. One of the highlights during this period was when Smith faked a heart attack during a match with Roop to avoid wrestling him. On January 19, 1980, Smith was in the corner of Bob Orton, Jr. in a "loser gets painted yellow" match against Ronnie Garvin at WNOX Auditorium. If Garvin won, Smith would have been forced to spend 2 minutes in the ring with him. On March 15, Smith teamed with The Destroyer in a handicap match against Garvin. Two weeks later, Garvin was lured into a "loser leaves town" match in exchange for a title shot against Tony Peters. Smith, however, was barred from ringside during the bout. A brawl between members of the Slapawitz Syndicate and Ronnie Garvin at the WNOX Auditorium resulted in Smith throwing a fireball for the first time in the territory. Smith's actions caused a riot with fans tearing the seats out of the floor and throwing them at the wrestlers. Smith and his men were able to escape the building unharmed. A fan pulled a knife on Smith outside, but he was disarmed by Tony Peters. The incident caused All Star Wrestling to lose access to the venue. On April Fools' Day, he led the Orton brothers to the Southern Tag Team Championship when they defeated Terry Gibbs and Bob Roop. Barry O was replaced by Tony Peters after leaving the territory. On May 24, 1980, Smith led his Southern Tag Team Champions against Garvin and Terry Gibbs at Evans-Collins Field.

=== International Championship Wrestling ===
All Star Wrestling was closely associated with another "outlaw" promotion, International Championship Wrestling, based in Lexington, Kentucky. When All Star merged with ICW, Smith was among the wrestlers who opted to join the sister promotion in Lexington, Kentucky. Smith and other All Star Wrestling stars were regulars on ICW's weekly television show prior to and following the merger. Slapawitz Syndicate members Barry Orton and Tony Peters did not make the move to Kentucky The ICW version of the Slapawitz Syndicate consisted of Bob Orton Jr., Crusher Broomfield, Rip Rogers, and the Devil's Duo (Doug Vines and Jeff Sword). Randy Savage and his manager Steve Cooper were also members for a time, most notably during their feud with midget wrestler Wee Willie. Smith's look varied depending on the territory he worked. In Knoxville, he dressed in a black robe and sported long bushy hair and beard. In real-life, Smith would sometime have trouble getting a hotel room because of his appearance. He also carried a whistle which he used to annoy fans at ringside.

Smith and his stable continued their feud against the fan favorites of the territory. In August 1980, Smith and Bob Orton, Jr. were involved in a controversial angle when they interfered in a match between Barry O and Ronnie Garvin. As Orton distracted the referee, Smith injected Garvin with an unknown substance that made the wrestler "foam at the mouth". ICW officials immediately disqualified Barry O and suspended Bob Orton, Jr. from a championship tournament to crown the first ICW Television Champion. Orton was able to sneak into the tournament as the masked wrestler The Best but was eliminated by Bob Roop in the quarter-finals.

In the following weeks, Smith and Bob Orton, Jr. were hounded about the identity of The Best. On the September 6th edition of International Championship Wrestling, Lanny Poffo brought out a sports bag he "found" to the announcers' desk while Orton (with Smith in his corner) wrestled "Pistol" Pez Whatley. Searching the bag, he showed co-announcer John Back and the studio audience the mask and wrestling tights worn by The Best. He quickly put the items back inside and returned backstage. Smith eventually noticed the bag on the desk, unaware that Poffo had opened the bag, and began blowing his whistle at Orton. The panicked wrestler left the ring, grabbed the sports bag, and hurried with Smith back to the locker room. Orton was counted out as a result. Later on, Bob Roop confronted Smith and Orton with the bag during a TV interview. When Orton insisted the bag was not his, Roop used a knife to rip it into shreds to see Orton’s reaction. To the crowd's amusement, Orton was clearly distraught as the expensive bag was destroyed. Smith and Orton showed up the following week's episode and brought out midget wrestler Mighty Cupid who claimed the $500 bag was his. In an attempt to garner sympathy with the crowd, Orton promised to take the $500 out on Roop.

On September 20, 1980, the Devil's Duo made their ICW television debut with an impressive win over George Weingeroff and Jim Pride. The team's name was created by promoter Angelo Poffo who was part of the original Devil's Duo with Chris Markoff and manager Bobby Heenan during the 1960s. As their manager, Smith accompanied them to the ring holding a book he called the "Kaba Kaba" and muttering supposedly occult phrases. These theatrical hints of mock-satanism helped to put the team over with the fans but also limited their exposure, as many other territories at that time were too 'Bible Belt' for any satanism gimmick to be used. Nevertheless, the team quickly established themselves as top contenders for the promotion's U.S. and Southeastern Tag Team titles. On April 25, 1981, Smith led the Devil's Duo to the ICW United States Tag Team Championship, which they won from Lanny Poffo and George Weingeroff at Henry Clay High School. He threw a fireball to help his team win the tag team title. Shortly after their victory, Smith went on live TV to congratulate his team for winning the belts and bragged to the crowd about the amount of "fan mail" his champions had received. He also mentioned a letter from "his cousin overseas" and suddenly displayed a picture of Ayatollah Khomeini. This upset many in audience as the U.S. was still in the midst of the Iranian hostage crisis. Smith continued to taunt the crowd and ended by turning to the camera asking "Oh yeah? Well, how many hostages do YOU have?". Before the end of the show, a mob had formed outside the TV studio. The wrestlers were trapped in the building until a police escort arrived. The promotion had to arrange special security for the trio for the next several months.

On May 6, Smith and the Devil's Duo entered in a $10,000 battle royal held in Frankfort, Kentucky. Smith was one of the final three participants along with Jeff Sword and Ronnie Garvin. As Garvin was attempting a piledriver on Sword, a masked man entered the ring, climbed to the top rope and hit Garvin with a 2x4. This allowed Sword to toss Garvin out of the ring. The masked wrestler, later called The Destroyer, turned his attention towards the two remaining men. Still holding the 2x4, The Destroyer stared them down but withdrew when Doug Vines joined his teammates. Smith was declared the winner of the battle royal. On his way out of the ring, Smith dropped the $10,000 check. A fan picked it up and saw it had "void" written across it. The promotion explained this by claiming that the ring check was ceremonial and that the winner would be given the actual one within a few days.

That summer, Smith was attacked by fans during an ICW house show in Illinois. It was during a rematch against Poffo and Weingeroff that Smith secretly handed a chain to one of his men. The event was held in a high school gym without guardrails or security and angry fans were able to surround the manager. Poffo and Weingeroff convinced the crowd to hand Smith to them and the wrestlers quickly rushed him back to the dressing room. Smith sustained a swollen knee from the assault and believed that he would have sustained more serious injuries had his opponents not intervened. It was this incident that led to his decision to leave the territory. Smith blamed Angelo Poffo for not hiring security to work at the event which led to a verbal altercation with the promoter. Poffo ordered Smith and his team to turn over the tag team belts. He also had Slapawitz Syndicate member Barry Orton, Jr. surrender his Southeastern title. But Smith was not alone as many others had grown tired of the excessive traveling, low payoffs and poor working conditions. The Poffo family's feud with Jerry Jarrett and the Continental Wrestling Association had also alienated Smith and others who had friends in the Memphis territory. Smith and the Devil's Duo were the first of many ICW mainstays who left during the summer and fall of 1981. Smith and the Devil's Duo were considered the promotion's top "heel" tag team at the time of their departure. Angelo Poffo later blamed Smith for the loss of talent. Despite the falling out between him and the Poffos, Smith spoke highly of the tight-knit comradery among the ICW roster.

The Devil's Duo dropped the belts back to Lanny Poffo and George Weingeroff in Owenton, Kentucky on June 15, 1981. Smith did not appear for the show, and all three members left the promotion shortly after this event. Prior to this, Randy Savage had left the Slapawitz Syndicate and had put a $2000 bounty on the manager. On the July 25th, 1981 edition of International Championship Wrestling, Randy Savage aired a video of he and The Destroyer "taking out" Slapawitz with the masked wrestler collecting the reward.

=== NWA Hollywood Wrestling ===
As he was preparing to leave ICW, Smith got an offer from Tom Renesto who was booking for the NWA's Los Angeles territory. Renesto wanted him to appear for its annual battle royal at the Olympic Auditorium where he would win the NWA Americas Heavyweight Championship. The Devil's Duo were also to have a title run with the NWA Americas Tag Team Championships. Smith and his men planned to go in late 1981. The three backed out at the last minute, however, as the Knoxville territory was doing so well and were also being discouraged from wrestlers coming back from Los Angeles. NWA Hollywood Wrestling closed down the following year.

=== Southern Championship Wrestling ===
Shortly after leaving ICW, Smith joined Southern Championship Wrestling based Knoxville, Tennessee. Owned by Blackjack Mulligan and Ric Flair, the small promotion also had the backing of NWA Mid-Atlantic Championship Wrestling owner Jim Crockett, Jr. Smith contacted Kevin Sullivan who was booking for SCW and agreed to use him albeit on the bottom of the card. Smith's first appearance was a house show in Virginia where he was a last-minute replacement for The Mongolian Stomper in the tag team main event against Blackjack Mulligan and Blackjack Mulligan, Jr. Neither Smith nor the promoters were aware that they were in an area where local wrestling fans received ICW television. The crowd immediately recognized Smith as Izzy Slapowitz and loudly booed him as he entered the ring. The strong fan reaction impressed Blackjack Mulligan and used Smith as a mid-card performer for the rest of the time in the promotion. Sullivan also remembered Smith from the Sunnyside Gardens incident ten years earlier. The wrestler no longer held a grudge towards Smith and they became good friends while in the promotion.

Two weeks after Slapawitz's debut, the Devil's Duo were brought into the territory from ICW. Many of the Virginia towns that SCW ran in, such as Lynchburg, Virginia, were part of the Bible Belt and it was felt that the name might turn off fans from attending shows. The team's name was changed to "The Hollywood Blondes" and they were initially managed by Jimmy Holiday. Smith rejoined the Devil's Duo when Holiday left to work in the Mid-Atlantic territory. Smith held dual roles as both a manager and wrestler during this period. He mainly appeared in a "wrestling manager" role for Mulligan's shows in the Knoxville end of the territory and wrestled for the co-promotional shows with Crockett's side of the territory in Central Virginia area. Among his opponents included Ron Wright and Dennis Brown, defeating the latter in bouts at the Salem Civic Center and the Roanoke Civic Center. Smith also wrestled both Terry Taylor and his former trainer Rick Connors to time-limit draws on SCW television. Additionally, he accompanied Kevin Sullivan and Ray Candy as a manager.

=== Georgia Championship Wrestling ===
Smith was among the SCW roster Mulligan sent to Georgia Championship Wrestling television tapings. In the fall of 1981, Smith made a number of appearances at WTBS Studios in Atlanta. His first GCW television appearance was a tag team match with Dave Forrester against George Wells and Steve O on the September 12th 1981 edition of Georgia Championship Wrestling. Smith teamed with Iron Mike Sharpe against Wells and Bruno Sammartino Jr. the following week. In his last GCW appearance, Smith and Jose Medina lost to The Oates Brothers (Jerry Oates and Ted Oates) on the October 3rd 1981 episode of Georgia Championship Wrestling.

=== Maple Leaf Wrestling ===
On November 15, 1981, Smith and Doug Vines made a one-time appearance in Maple Leaf Wrestling for their 50th anniversary show at Maple Leaf Gardens; they lost to Mike Davis and Tony Parisi. Smith had been sent to Canada by Mulligan for a one-time appearance. However, the Tunney family were so impressed by Smith that they made him an offer to work in the Toronto wrestling territory the morning he was checking out of his hotel. Smith declined the offer as he did not want to move his family to Canada. While at the show, Smith was photographed backstage with Charlie Fulton and Mike Miller watching Big John Studd demonstrating a facerake on Doug Vines. The photo became part of a feature story entitled "The John Studd School of Rulebreaking" which was published in The Wrestler several months later. Stu Saks later claimed that one of the few articles he had pulled from the Apter magazines was an Izzy Slapowitz story written by then columnist Steve Farhood.

=== Jim Crockett Promotions ===
Due to SCW's connection to Jim Crockett, Smith and the Devil's Duo were invited to Mid-Atlantic Championship Wrestling. One of their Crockett shows was at a state fair in Harrisonburg, Virginia on November 19, 1981. The local promoter had booked Smith to wrestle Doug Vines apparently unaware that "Izzy Slapowitz" was managing Vines in Knoxville. Smith knew the local fans would be confused, especially as the two wrestlers had spent the day walking around the fair. To protect kayfabe, the two decided to change the match at the last minute. Smith announced to the crowd that they were wrestling each other to show the audience how tough they were and vowed that "blood would be spilled". Smith and Vines then proceeded to wrestle a hardcore-style brawl, involving chairs and the ringposts, that ended in a double-disqualification. On December 26, 1981, Smith wrestled Abe Jacobs, the one-time "Jewish Heavyweight Champion", in Greenville, North Carolina losing via referee's decision.

According to Smith, the Devil's Duo were originally going to compete in a championship tournament for the then vacant NWA Mid-Atlantic Tag Team Championship and win the titles. Ole Anderson, who was booking JCP at the time, instead split the trio up. In their first TV appearance for the company, Doug Vines and Jeff Sword wrestled in singles matches while Smith, whose name was changed, was put in a tag team match. When the three men returned to Knoxville the following day, they told Mulligan what had happened and the promoter drove to Charlotte where he confronted Anderson in the dressing room. Smith later speculated that their problems with Ole Anderson may have stemmed from real-life animosity between the two.

The Devil's Duo remained the top "heel" tag team in SCW even after Crockett took full control of the Knoxville territory. The trio continued to have difficulty with Ole Anderson who cancelled many of their shows scheduled by assistant booker Johnny Weaver in early 1982. Smith decided to quit when all of his bookings were suddenly dropped except for a single show in Myrtle Beach, South Carolina. The last-ever appearance of Slapawitz and Devil's Duo was supposed to be a six-man tag team match in Knoxville against Jimmy Snuka, Jimmy Valiant and Johnny Weaver. Dusty Rhodes had taken over as booker shortly afterwards. Smith had a very good relationship with Rhodes who expressed interest in using the Devil's Duo. Jeff Sword had lost interest in pro wrestling by this time and, after a brief stint as Assassin#2, left the business.

=== Later career (1985-1991) ===
While Doug Vines stayed with JCP, Smith chose not to return to JCP. He began scaling back his wrestling schedule during the mid-to-late 1980s. His last major run was working for Bill Needham's All Star Championship Wrestling in northeastern Tennessee. One of his most memorable moments in the promotion was when he faked a heart attack during a bare knuckles match against Rick Conner in 1990. It was also in ASCW that Smith was reunited with The Devil's Duo. The team won the ASCW Tag Team Championship twice and Doug Vines won the ASCW Heavyweight Championship five times. On January 8, 1991, he made a brief appearance on WWF Wrestling Challenge taping against Jake "The Snake" Roberts at UTC Arena in Chattanooga.

== Retirement ==
Smith went into retirement after the close of ASCW in 1992. He returned to New York and worked as an insurance salesman until the mid-2000s due to health problems. In 2007, Smith underwent emergency ascending aortic dissection surgery. The lengthy recovery period and blood pressure medication he was put on prevented him from working as a sales rep. Smith was still receiving cardiac therapy for his heart four years after his surgery. In May 2011, he was interviewed by Canadian Online Explorer regarding the death of Randy Savage. On September 18, 2011, Smith was among the featured guests at the Legends Show in Knoxville's Chilhowee Park. It was his first public appearance as "Izzy Slapowitz" in 20 years. Smith was also invited to the private Tennessee Wrestling Legends Reunion in Gallatin, Tennessee a year later. On February 13, 2013, Smith was interviewed on the Mantell's Corral podcast with Johnny Mantell where he discussed his career and shared road stories. He also expressed concerns that younger wrestlers no longer had access to the unique training environment the NWA territory system provided to learn the craft of pro wrestling.

== Internet writings ==
=== Involvement in the "internet wrestling community" ===
Since 2001, Smith was involved in the internet wrestling community interacting with fans on KayfabeMemories.com and WrestlingClassics.com. He was briefly a KayfabeMemories.com guest columnist in 2004. In 2008, Smith participated in a "shoot interview" available on DVD.

=== Political commentator ===
A Jewish-American conservative, Smith was a member of the Libertarian Party of New York in Queens. He revived his "Izzy Slapawitz" character for a series of YouTube videos between June 2011 and September 2012. In these videos, Smith discussed the debt ceiling crisis, free speech, right-to-work legislation, support for Israel, and U.S. foreign policy in the Middle East.

== Death ==
Smith died on December 28, 2019, after suffering cardiac arrest during surgery.

== Championships and accomplishments ==
- Other titles
  - IWC United States Heavyweight Championship (1 time)

== See also ==
- List of Jewish professional wrestlers
