= All-Star Championship Wrestling =

- Acronym: ASCW
- Founded: June 1979
- Defunct: May 1980
- Style: Rasslin'
- Headquarters: Knoxville, Tennessee
- Founder(s): Ron Wright; Ronnie Garvin; Bob Roop; Bob Orton, Jr. Boris Malenko
- Owner: The Knoxville 5
- Sister: International Championship Wrestling

All-Star Championship Wrestling (ASCW) was a professional wrestling promotion that was founded in Knoxville, Tennessee by Ron Wright, Ronnie Garvin, Bob Roop, Bob Orton, Jr. and Boris Malenko in 1979. The group, informally known as "The Knoxville 5", broke away from Southeastern Championship Wrestling (SECW) and fought a six-month war against National Wrestling Alliance promoter Ron Fuller over control of the NWA's Knoxville territory. Although the "outlaw" group was successful in its efforts to oust Fuller, the promotional war is blamed for "killing" pro wrestling in Knoxville for several years during the 1980s wrestling boom.

== History ==
The organization was formed by Ronnie Garvin, Bob Roop, Bob Orton, Jr. and Boris Malenko after leaving Southeastern Championship Wrestling. They began plans to run opposition against NWA promoter Ron Fuller in the spring of 1979. A major source of friction were creative differences and backstage politics involving the promoter's brother, Robert Fuller, who was involved with SECW's office at the time. It was also suspected that Ron Fuller was stealing money from the talent. The incident which finally triggered the split occurred when Bob Roop and Ron Wright allegedly caught the ticket sellers stealing money from the gate at an SECW house show. After confronting Fuller, Roop was convinced they had been acting under the promoter's orders.

I went to see [Ron Fuller]. I told him what was happening, suspecting he was not only aware of it, but likely the one ordering it done. My suspicions were justified by his response to my charge of the double ticket selling. He told me he couldn’t believe his ticket people would or could do that, just registered total shock and disbelief, in effect denying it was happening. Well, let me ask you: if the general manager as well as one of the top talents of your company comes to you with these kind of accusations, do you think you are going to deny them out of hand? … NO! You’re going to tell him that you are going to be looking into that accusation, thank him for letting you know about it, that you will get to the bottom of it, etc.

That he denied that it could be happening and clearly planned on continuing to do the same thing, made him my enemy. He was stealing from me every night, taking money I had given blood, sweat and tears to earn, he wasn’t satisfied that we were doing great business and earning him a fortune, he had to steal off the top of it. That he would lie to my face and deny what I presented to him as known factual evidence to me was to me a personal insult and lost whatever small affection or respect I might have felt for him. That he thought I would take it and be happy because I was making quite a bit of money even being shafted was a reflection as to his opinion of my character and another deeply-felt personal insult. That he would let us run the entire show, give us carte blanche to do what we wished with his territory, then give us the old shaftola? He clearly thought we were all stooges who would just put up with that kind of insult! He was wrong!

— Kayfabe Memories, 3 April 2003

A friend of Roop's from the NWA's Florida territory, Dick Slater, was staying at his home while recovering from an accidental gunshot wound. Roop had convinced Fuller to bring Slater into SECW, paying him a weekly $800 guarantee while injured, and personally loaned Slater an additional $1,000. Slater allegedly agreed to join Roop's group but secretly informed Florida promoter Eddie Graham who then warned Fuller about their plans to steal the Knoxville territory. Fuller confronted Roop who agreed to resign his position as booker. Fuller gave the position to Slater. This forced Roop and his partners to proceed earlier than they had planned.

"I don't know about his lawyer but I'm sure Fuller must have been pissed (and rightly so when you think about it). As for splitting a gut, every time a group of us boys hung out on the boat at Norris Lake we all had a pretty good time and laugh at Fuller's expense. Seriously though you have to appreciate Fuller's dilemma. Had he not kept kayfabe he probably would have gotten his boat back. But he would have put his business at great risk. Fuller's promotion at the time was extremely successful drawing sellout crowds weekly both in the home city of Knoxville and also several other weekly and spot shows."

— In a June 2005 Q&A session, Izzy Slapawitz discusses the Garvin-Fuller lawsuit

Garvin was involved in a storyline feud with Fuller over the NWA Southeastern Heavyweight Championship prior to the split. A week before his departure, Garvin won both the title and a boat owned by Fuller. He was supposed to lose the belt the following week, however, Garvin and his partners planned to run their first show instead. Garvin brought the title with him upon forming All-Star Championship Wrestling and continued making title defenses on All-Star and ICW shows. SECW did not acknowledge this and quietly purchased a new belt. In addition to winning the title, Garvin also won a boat owned by Fuller. This was part of a scripted storyline rather than a legitimate prize but Garvin kept the boat. The promoter brought Garvin to court in an effort to recover his property, however, Fuller lost the case.

Its television show, "All Star Championship Wrestling", aired on WTVK (Channel 26) in Knoxville and syndicated to WKPT (Channel 19) in Kingsport, Tennessee and WKYH (Channel 57) in Hazard, Kentucky. Big Jim Hess, a former SECW announcer, was able to use his connections as a sales representative at WTVK to get All-Star on television. SECW had originally aired on WTVK before Fuller bought the promotion and moved the show to WBIR (Channel 10). Throughout its run, All-Star had poor television coverage in Knoxville compared to SECW. They did, however, possess a strong talent roster giving All-Star a decided advantage against their NWA-backed rival which was receiving talent from Championship Wrestling from Florida, Georgia Championship Wrestling, and Jim Crockett Promotions.

Things soon got very heated between the two groups. Like ICW, All-Star wrestlers often taunted their NWA rivals in public. The promoters offered up to $5,000 to those who could defeat an All-Star wrestler at one of their shows. One All-Star live event at Bill Meyer Stadium on September 22, 1979, advertised a "Chicken Challenge" bout between Bob Orton, Jr. and Ron Fuller. The winner would win $5,000 or be declared a "chicken" if Fuller did not appear. Dick Slater, Ox Baker, Jimmy Golden and Sterling Golden were similarly targeted. In October 1979, Fuller was granted a temporary restraining order against Garvin, Roop, Orton and Malenko. Fuller claimed the four wrestlers were attempting to run him out of business and had acted "in a disorderly and obnoxious manner" at NWA Southeastern shows in order to drive off wrestling fans. Fuller was seeking up to $2.5 million in damages at the time of the lawsuit.

Ron Fuller finally withdrew from Knoxville at the end of the year and sold the NWA Knoxville office to Georgia Championship Wrestling promoter Jim Barnett. Fuller replaced Knoxville with Birmingham as the main end of SECW's territory and continued promoting in Alabama for a number of years. Fuller attempted a return to Knoxville several times during the 1980s, his last effort being the short-lived USA Championship Wrestling (1988), but was never able to repeat the same success he had in the previous decade with SECW.

=== Territorial reach ===
All-Star Championship Wrestling was primarily based in Knoxville and ran shows in East Tennessee and parts of Kentucky and West Virginia. It competed for many of the same towns that SECW ran within NWA's Knoxville territory. All-Star held weekly shows and regularly sold out the WNOX Auditorium. The promotion was forced to find another home, however, due to property damage caused by rioting fans on March 15, 1980. All-Star also held outdoor shows at Evans-Collins Field. Other promotions in the area included NWA Mid-America promoter Nick Gulas, who controlled Chattanooga and Nashville, Tennessee, and Jerry Jarrett's Continental Wrestling Association in Memphis. After the end of the war with Fuller, the owners left Knoxville and relocated to the Lexington, Kentucky area.

=== Notable talent ===
Unlike typical "outlaw" promotions, All-Star Championship Wrestling were able to feature mainstream talent. Along with the four founding members, Ronnie Garvin, Bob Roop, Bob Orton, Jr. and Boris Malenko, a number of SECW wrestlers jumped to All-Star Wrestling including The Assassin, Barry O, "Pistol" Pez Whatley, Terry Gibbs and brothers Don & Ron Wright. Ron Wright, then color commentator for SECW, left Fuller to join All-Star and became an important figure behind the scenes. The main "heel" stable was the "Slapawitz Syndicate" led by manager Izzy Slapawitz and included at various times Malenko, Orton, Barry O, Randy Savage, Rip Rogers and Tony Peters. According to Slapawitz, Savage perfected his familiar "Macho Man" persona during this period.

Buddy Landel, a future NWA National Heavyweight Champion, got his start with All-Star Championship Wrestling. The young wrestler initially lived with Bob Roop and his wife in Knoxville. After ASW merged with ICW, Landell and female wrestler Donna Day slept in the front window of Savage's gym in Lexington. All-Star's limited exposure on television, however, was blamed for keeping other younger wrestlers from being noticed by the bigger promotions.

=== Association with International Championship Wrestling ===
Soon after declaring war on Fuller, All-Star found an ally in Angelo Poffo and his outlaw promotion International Championship Wrestling based in Lexington, Kentucky. Poffo had been feuding with NWA promoter Jerry Jarrett and the Continental Wrestling Association in Memphis and was looking to gain a foothold in Tennessee. The two groups shared talent and co-promoted shows in the Knoxville area. One of these shows, "Battle Against Muscular Dystrophy", was held at the Chilhowee Park Amphitheater on August 8, 1980. Half of the money raised at the event was donated to the Muscular Dystrophy Association. They also collaborated on a weekly television series, "International All-Star Wrestling", which gave All-Star significant television exposure in Kentucky. Poffo's sons, Lanny Poffo and Randy Savage, were regularly featured on All-Star shows with Savage defending the ICW Heavyweight Championship against Knoxville challengers. Many former All-Star wrestlers later joined the Poffo's after the promotion ceased operations in Knoxville. Ronnie Garvin, Bob Roop and Bob Orton, Jr. became minority owners after the merger with ICW.

=== Demise ===
All-Star had achieved a rare win over an NWA-affiliated promotion. It proved to be a Pyrrhic victory however, as the promotional war burned out many wrestling fans and effectively killed the Knoxville territory. Jim Cornette believed negative press coverage during this period was largely responsible. It would be five years before it became profitable to run pro wrestling in the city. Eastern Championship Wrestling, a short-lived "outlaw" group, held shows at John Sevier Elementary School in the immediate aftermath of the war. Other promotions unsuccessfully attempted to take over the region during this period including, most notably, Georgia Championship Wrestling and Jim Crockett Promotions. All-Star struggled in the months following Fuller's departure and eventually merged with ICW in May 1980. Ronnie Garvin, Bob Roop and Bob Orton, Jr. became minority owners after the All-Star/ICW merger. Boris Malenko opted to leave Knoxville and established his own "outlaw" group, Sun Belt Wrestling, in Jacksonville, Florida in early 1981. The Poffos continued their war against NWA promoter Jerry Jarrett and the Continental Wrestling Association in Memphis which did not end until ICW's close in 1984.

== Alumni ==
Male wrestlers

Birth name:	Ring name(s):	Tenure:	Notes
Roger Barnes	Ronnie Garvin	1979–1980	
Dick Beyer	The Destroyer	1980	
DeVoy Brunson	DeVoy Brunson	1979–1980	
Plasee Conway Jr.	Tiger Conway Jr.	1979	
Ralph Derreberry	Big Boy Williams	1980	
William Ensor^{†}	Buddy Landel	1979–1980	
Donald Gaston	Don Carson	1979	
Ginger^{†}	Ginger, the Wrestling Bear	1979–1980	
Tommy Heggie	Jim Pride	1979	
Patrick Helvey	Ric McCord	1979–1980	
Maury High^{†}	Rocket Monroe	1980	
George McCreary	George McCreary	1979	
Benny McGuire^{†}	Benny MacQuire	1979	
Bob Orton Jr.	Bob Orton Jr. / The Best	1979–1980	
Randal Orton	Barry O / Berry O	1979–1980	
Angelo Poffo^{†}	The Miser	1979–1980^{ICW}	
Lanny Poffo	Leaping Lanny	1979–1980^{ICW}	
Randy Poffo^{†}	Randy Savage	1979–1980^{ICW}	
Robert Roop	Bob Roop / The Black Avenger	1979–1980	
Gibson Rowell	Hoot Gibson	1979–1980	
Manuel Saine	Terry Gibbs	1979–1980	
Stanley Sasaki^{†}	Haru Sasaki	1979	
Mark Sciarra	Rip Rogers	1979–1980	
Lawrence Simon^{†}	Prof. Boris Malenko	1979–1980	
Roger Smith	The Assassin / The Masked Assassin	1979	
George Weingroff	George Weingroff	1979–1980^{ICW}	
Pezavan Whatley^{†}	Pez Whatley	1979	
Donald Wright	Don Wright	1979–1980	
Unknown	B.B. Lewis	1979–1980	
Unknown	Cousin George the Hillbilly	1980	
Unknown	Doug Vines	1980^{ICW}	
Unknown	Jeff Sword	1980^{ICW}	
Unknown	Man Mountain Dean	1979–1980	
Unknown	Mighty Yankee #1	1980	
Unknown	Mighty Yankee #2	1980	
Unknown	The Spoiler	1979	
Unknown	Tony Peters	1979–1980	
Unknown	Wayne Rogers	1980	
Unknown	Zodiac	1979	

Female wrestlers

Birth name:	Ring name(s):	Tenure:	Notes
Cora Svonsteckik^{†}	Lady Satan	1979	
Debbie Szostecki	Debbie Combs	1979; 1980	
Unknown	Debbie Brunson	1980	
Unknown	Kay Roberts	1979	

Midget wrestlers

Birth name:	Ring name(s):	Tenure:	Notes
Unknown	Fuzzy Cupid	1979	
Unknown	Little Duke	1979	
Unknown	Wee Willie	1979	

Stables and tag teams

Tag team/Stable(s)	Members	Tenure(s)
Bob Roop & Bob Orton Jr.	Bob Roop and Bob Orton Jr.	1979
Leaping Lanny & George Weingroff	Leaping Lanny and George Weingroff	1980^{ICW}
The Mighty Yankees	Mighty Yankee #1 and Mighty Yankee #2	1980
Slapawitz Syndicate	Izzy Slapawitz, Boris Malenko, Bob Orton Jr., Barry O, Randy Savage, Rip Rogers and Tony Peters	1979–1980

Managers and valets

Birth name:	Ring name(s):	Tenure:	Notes
Yasuyuki Fuji	Colonel Yan Ky	1979	
Lawrence Simon^{†}	Prof. Boris Malenko	1979–1980	
Jeff Smith	Izzy Slapawitz	1979–1980	
Unknown^{†}	Steve Cooper	1980^{ICW}	

Commentators and interviewers

Birth name:	Ring name(s):	Tenure:	Notes
Jim Hess	Big Jim Hess	1979	
Ronald Wright^{†}	Ron Wright	1979–1980	

Other personnel

Birth name:	Ring name(s):	Tenure:	Notes
Roger Barnes	Ronnie Garvin	1979–1980	Owner; Booker
Bob Orton Jr.	Bob Orton Jr.	1979–1980	Owner; Booker
Robert Roop	Bob Roop	1979–1980	Owner; Booker
Lawrence Simon^{†}	Boris Malenko	1979–1980	Owner; Booker
Ronald Wright^{†}	Ron Wright	1979–1980	Promoter

Notes
^{†} Indicates they are deceased.
^{ICW} Indicates they were part of a talent exchange with the International Championship Wrestling.

== Championships and programming ==
=== Championships ===
Championship	Notes
All-Star Southeastern Heavyweight Championship	The heavyweight title of ASW. It was established in 1979 continued to be defended within the promotion until 1980.
All-Star Southeastern Tag Team Championship	The tag team title of ASW. It was established in 1979 continued to be defended within the promotion until 1980.

=== Programming ===
Programming	Notes
All Star Championship Wrestling	(1979) Syndicated
International All-Star Wrestling	(1980–1981) Syndicated
