= Dwight Muhammad Qawi =

American boxer (1953–2025)

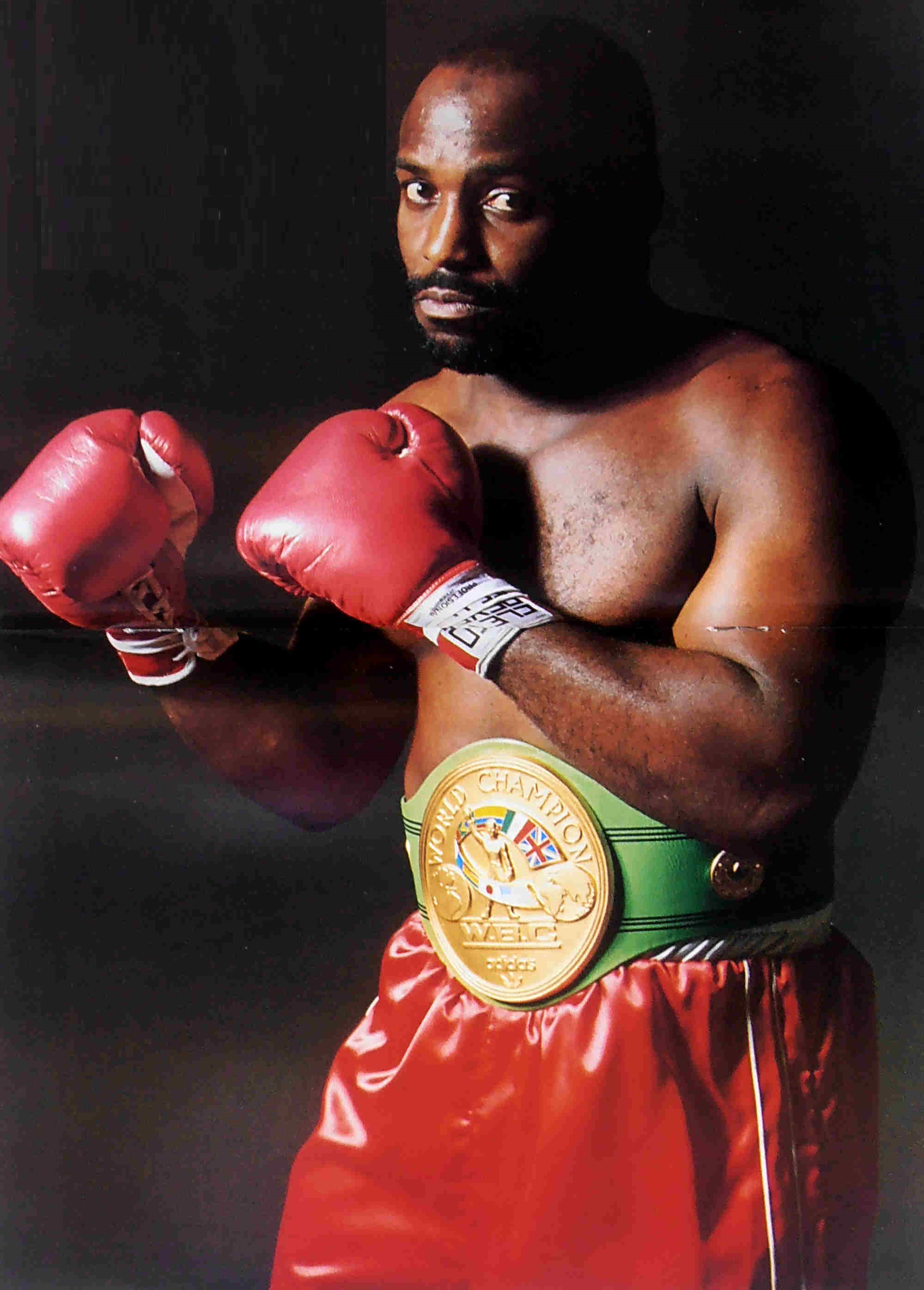
- Qawi c. 1986

Personal information
- Nickname: Camden Buzzsaw
- Born: Dwight Braxton; January 5, 1953 Baltimore, Maryland, U.S.
- Died: July 25, 2025 (aged 72) Baltimore, Maryland, U.S.
- Height: 5 ft 6.5 in (169 cm)
- Weight: Light heavyweight; Cruiserweight; Heavyweight

Boxing career
- Reach: 71 in (180 cm)
- Stance: Orthodox

Boxing record
- Total fights: 53
- Wins: 41
- Win by KO: 25
- Losses: 11
- Draws: 1

Dwight Muhammad Qawi (/kɑːˈwiː/ kah-WEE; born Dwight Braxton; January 5, 1953 – July 25, 2025) was an American professional boxer who competed from 1978 to 1998. He was a world champion in two weight classes, having held the WBC and Ring magazine light heavyweight titles from 1981 to 1983, and the WBA cruiserweight title from 1985 to 1986. Qawi was inducted into the International Boxing Hall of Fame in 2004.

== Early life ==
Qawi, born Dwight Braxton, was born in Baltimore, Maryland, but grew up in Camden, New Jersey, where he got involved with crime at a young age. He was eventually convicted of armed robbery and spent around five years in prison.

It was in Rahway State Prison that Braxton found his place in life. The prison had an extensive boxing program and one of its inmates, James Scott, was a light heavyweight title contender who fought several times inside the prison itself. Braxton took up the sport, and when he was released from prison in 1978, immediately became a professional boxer. Qawi's style was most often likened to Joe Frazier, an infighting style with heavy use of feints and head movement, with relentless pressure and a crab shell defense, and with good reason as he had trained in Frazier's Philadelphia gym as a professional. He converted to Islam in the early 1980s and had his name changed from Dwight Braxton to Dwight Muhammad Qawi.

== Professional career ==
He went 1–1–1 in his first three pro fights, but then reeled off 14 straight victories to move into the world rankings at light heavyweight. The last of those wins came on September 5, 1981, when Braxton returned to Rahway to fight Scott, with the winner promised a shot at Matthew Saad Muhammad's WBC world championship belt. Braxton won a unanimous 10-round decision.

On December 19 of the same year, Braxton faced Saad Muhammad in Atlantic City. Braxton was the underdog against Saad, one of the most popular fighters of his generation and a fellow future Hall of Famer, but Braxton defeated him on a 10th-round technical knockout and became a world champion for the first time. It was shortly after this that he announced his conversion to Islam and changed his name.

He defended the title three times in the next 15 months, knocking out Jerry Martin, Saad Muhammad a second time and Eddie Davis. On March 18, 1983, he lost a close but unanimous decision to WBA champion Michael Spinks in a unification bout.

Qawi felt that making the division's 175-pound weight limit had drained him physically, and resolved to seek another world title in the newly created cruiserweight division. Freed of the need to fight to keep his weight down, Qawi reeled off another series of wins and claimed the WBA cruiserweight title on July 7, 1985, knocking out Piet Crous in Crous' native South Africa.

He won two more fights, including a victory over former world heavyweight titlist Leon Spinks, before accepting a challenge from Olympian Evander Holyfield on July 12, 1986. The fight, in Holyfield's hometown of Atlanta, went the full 15 rounds, with Holyfield winning a split decision.

After the loss to Holyfield, Qawi fought off and on for the next 12 years, but never regained a world title. He rematched with Holyfield in 1987 for the WBA and IBF cruiserweight titles, but was stopped in the fourth round.

After a short stint in the heavyweight ranks, where in 1988 he lost to George Foreman by knockout in seven rounds, being forced to quit from exhaustion, he tried to regain the cruiserweight title. On November 27, 1989, he dropped a split decision to Robert Daniels for Holyfield's vacated WBA title.

Qawi retired in 1999 at the age of 46, with a career record of 41 wins, 11 losses and one draw, with 25 wins by way of knockout. He worked as a boxing trainer in New Jersey.

== Later life and death ==
In 1998, Dwight began working at the Lighthouse, a drug and alcohol rehabilitation center in Mays Landing, New Jersey. He worked with both adults and adolescents and was a patient advocate.

On July 25, 2025, Qawi died at the age of 72 at a nursing home in Baltimore, Maryland. He had been diagnosed with dementia five years prior.

== Professional boxing record ==
53 fights	41 wins	11 losses
By knockout	25	2
By decision	16	9
Draws	1	

No.	Result	Record	Opponent	Type	Round, time	Date	Location	Notes
53	Loss	41–11–1	Tony LaRosa	UD	8	Nov 25, 1998	Ramada Inn, Rosemont, Illinois, U.S.	
52	Win	41–10–1	Tyrone Demby	TKO	2	Jun 27, 1997	Tropicana Casino & Resort, Atlantic City, New Jersey, U.S.	
51	Win	40–10–1	Earl Clark	UD	6	May 8, 1997	Boys and Girls Club, Paterson, New Jersey, U.S.	
50	Loss	39–10–1	Nate Miller	UD	10	Oct 13, 1992	The Blue Horizon, Philadelphia, Pennsylvania, U.S.	
49	Win	39–9–1	Dave Fiddler	TKO	2 (8), 2:59	Jul 18, 1992	The Mirage, Paradise, Nevada, U.S.	
48	Loss	38–9–1	Arthur Williams	UD	10	May 8, 1992	Riviera, Winchester, Nevada, U.S.	
47	Win	38–8–1	Ric Lainhart	TKO	1 (10), 3:00	Apr 7, 1992	Broadway by the Bay Theater, Atlantic City, New Jersey, U.S.	
46	Win	37–8–1	Ricky Parkey	RTD	8 (10), 3:00	Nov 7, 1991	Grand Hyatt, Washington, D.C., U.S.	Won vacant WBC Continental Americas cruiserweight title
45	Win	36–8–1	Eddie Taylor	RTD	4 (10), 3:00	Jul 23, 1991	Broadway by the Bay Theater, Atlantic City, New Jersey, U.S.	
44	Win	35–8–1	James Salerno	UD	10	Jun 11, 1991	Tamiami Fairgrounds Auditorium, Miami, Florida, U.S.	
43	Win	34–8–1	Tommy Richardson	KO	1	Apr 20, 1991	Convention Hall, Atlantic City, New Jersey, U.S.	
42	Win	33–8–1	Bert Gravley	TKO	3	March 2, 1991	Broadway by the Bay Theater, Atlantic City, New Jersey, U.S.	
41	Loss	32–8–1	Mike Hunter	UD	12	Mar 16, 1990	Essex County College, Newark, New Jersey, U.S.	Lost WBC Continental Americas cruiserweight title
40	Loss	32–7–1	Robert Daniels	SD	12	Nov 27, 1989	Pavillon Baltard, Nogent-le-Phaye, France	For vacant WBA cruiserweight title
39	Win	32–6–1	Everett Martin	UD	10	May 22, 1989	Circus Maximus Showroom, Atlantic City, New Jersey, U.S.	
38	Win	31–6–1	Andre McCall	UD	12	Apr 18, 1989	Catholic Youth Center, Scranton, Pennsylvania, U.S.	Won vacant WBC Continental Americas cruiserweight title
37	Win	30–6–1	Tyrone Booze	MD	10	Feb 15, 1989	Pennsylvania Hall, Philadelphia, Pennsylvania, U.S.	
36	Win	29–6–1	Olian Alexander	TKO	3 (10), 0:53	Nov 23, 1988	Convention Hall, Philadelphia, Pennsylvania, U.S.	
35	Loss	28–6–1	George Foreman	TKO	7 (10), 1:51	Mar 19, 1988	Caesars Palace, Paradise, Nevada, U.S.	
34	Loss	28–5–1	Evander Holyfield	KO	4 (15), 2:30	Dec 5, 1987	Convention Hall, Atlantic City, New Jersey, U.S.	For WBA and IBF cruiserweight titles
33	Win	28–4–1	Lee Roy Murphy	TKO	6 (10), 1:30	Aug 15, 1987	Parking du Nouveau Port, Saint-Tropez, France	
32	Loss	27–4–1	Ossie Ocasio	MD	10	May 15, 1987	Caesars Palace, Paradise, Nevada, U.S.	
31	Win	27–3–1	Narcisco Maldonado	TKO	4 (10), 1:42	Feb 6, 1987	Trump Plaza Hotel and Casino, Atlantic City, New Jersey, U.S.	
30	Loss	26–3–1	Evander Holyfield	SD	15	Jul 12, 1986	Omni Coliseum, Atlanta, Georgia, U.S.	Lost WBA cruiserweight title
29	Win	26–2–1	Leon Spinks	TKO	6 (15), 2:56	Mar 22, 1986	Lawlor Events Center, Reno, Nevada, U.S.	Retained WBA cruiserweight title
28	Win	25–2–1	Rick Enis	KO	1 (10), 1:54	Jan 8, 1986	Broadway by the Bay Theater, Atlantic City, New Jersey, U.S.	
27	Win	24–2–1	Piet Crous	KO	11 (15), 1:47	Jul 27, 1985	Superbowl, Sun City, South Africa	Won WBA cruiserweight title
26	Win	23–2–1	Michael Greer	UD	10	Feb 27, 1985	Broadway by the Bay Theater, Atlantic City, New Jersey, U.S.	
25	Win	22–2–1	Stanley Ross	UD	10	Dec 12, 1984	Broadway by the Bay Theater, Atlantic City, New Jersey, U.S.	
24	Win	21–2–1	Pat Cuillo	UD	10	Mar 21, 1984	Broadway by the Bay Theater, Atlantic City, New Jersey, U.S.	
23	Win	20–2–1	Johnny Davis	SD	10	Sep 17, 1983	Sands, Atlantic City, New Jersey, U.S.	
22	Loss	19–2–1	Michael Spinks	UD	15	Mar 18, 1983	Convention Hall, Atlantic City, New Jersey, U.S.	Lost WBC and The Ring light heavyweight titles; For WBA light heavyweight title
21	Win	19–1–1	Eddie Davis	TKO	11 (15), 0:28	Nov 20, 1982	Convention Hall, Atlantic City, New Jersey, U.S.	Retained WBC and The Ring light heavyweight titles
20	Win	18–1–1	Matthew Saad Muhammad	TKO	6 (15), 1:23	Aug 7, 1982	Spectrum, Philadelphia, Pennsylvania, U.S.	Retained WBC and The Ring light heavyweight titles
19	Win	17–1–1	Jerry Martin	TKO	6 (15), 2:30	Mar 21, 1982	Showboat Hotel and Casino, Las Vegas, Nevada, U.S.	Retained WBC and The Ring light heavyweight titles
18	Win	16–1–1	Matthew Saad Muhammad	TKO	10 (15), 2:54	Dec 19, 1981	Playboy Hotel and Casino, Atlantic City, New Jersey, U.S.	Won WBC and The Ring light heavyweight titles
17	Win	15–1–1	James Scott	UD	10	Sep 5, 1981	Rahway State Prison, Woodbridge, New Jersey, U.S.	
16	Win	14–1–1	Mike Rossman	KO	7 (10), 1:59	May 31, 1981	Steel Pier, Atlantic City, New Jersey, U.S.	
15	Win	13–1–1	Al Bolden	UD	10	Mar 5, 1981	Pennsylvania Hall, Philadelphia, Pennsylvania, U.S.	
14	Win	12–1–1	Johnny Davis	MD	10	Jan 8, 1981	Steel Pier, Atlantic City, New Jersey, U.S.	
13	Win	11–1–1	Tony Mesoraca	TKO	6 (10)	Nov 6, 1980	Steel Pier, Atlantic City, New Jersey, U.S.	
12	Win	10–1–1	Rick Jester	TKO	3 (10)	Aug 14, 1980	International Amphitheatre, Chicago, Illinois, U.S.	
11	Win	9–1–1	Charles Smith	TKO	4 (10)	Jun 5, 1980	Steel Pier, Atlantic City, New Jersey, U.S.	
10	Win	8–1–1	Leonard Langley	TKO	2 (8), 2:47	May 8, 1980	Steel Pier, Atlantic City, New Jersey, U.S.	
9	Win	7–1–1	Cornell Chavis	TKO	1, 1:12	Mar 29, 1980	Steel Pier, Atlantic City, New Jersey, U.S.	
8	Win	6–1–1	Theunis Kok	KO	10 (10)	Feb 4, 1980	Kings Park Stadium, Durban, South Africa	
7	Win	5–1–1	Johnny Wilburn	UD	8	Nov 14, 1979	Civic Center, Baltimore, Maryland, U.S.	
6	Win	4–1–1	Donald Biff Cline	TKO	1, 1:48	Sep 26, 1979	Civic Center, Baltimore, Maryland, U.S.	
5	Win	3–1–1	Louis Butler	PTS	8	Jul 3, 1979	Steel Pier, Atlantic City, New Jersey, U.S.	
4	Win	2–1–1	Louis Butler	UD	6	May 25, 1979	Civic Center, Baltimore, Maryland, U.S.	
3	Loss	1–1–1	Johnny Davis	SD	6	Nov 2, 1978	Audubon Ballroom, New York City, U.S.	
2	Win	1–0–1	Lou Benson Jr.	PTS	6	Jun 3, 1978	Civic Center, Baltimore, Maryland, U.S.	
1	Draw	0–0–1	Leonard Langley	PTS	6	Apr 19, 1978	D.C. Armory, Washington, D.C., U.S.	

== See also ==
- List of world light-heavyweight boxing champions
- List of world cruiserweight boxing champions

Sporting positions
Regional boxing titles
Vacant Title last held by Michael Greer	WBC Continental Americas cruiserweight champion April 18, 1989 – March 16, 1990	Succeeded by Mike Hunter
Vacant Title last held by Mike Hunter	WBC Continental Americas cruiserweight champion November 7, 1991 – May 1993; Vacated	Vacant Title next held by Marc Randazzo
World boxing titles
Preceded by Matthew Saad Muhammad	WBC light heavyweight champion December 19, 1981 – March 18, 1983	Succeeded by Michael Spinks
Preceded by Matthew Saad Muhammad	The Ring light heavyweight champion December 19, 1981 – March 18, 1983	Succeeded by Michael Spinks
Preceded by Piet Crous	WBA cruiserweight champion July 27, 1985 – July 12, 1986	Succeeded by Evander Holyfield
