= Evander Holyfield vs. Ossie Ocasio =

1987 boxing match in Saint-Tropez, France

- Date: 15 August 1987
- Venue: Parking du Nouveau Port, Saint-Tropez, France
- Title(s) on the line: WBA and IBF cruiserweight titles

Tale of the tape
Boxer	Evander Holyfield	Ossie Ocasio
Nickname	"The Real Deal"	"Jaws"
Hometown	Atlanta, Georgia, U.S.	Santurce, San Juan, Puerto Rico
Pre-fight record	15–0 (11 KO)	21–4–1 (11 KO)
Age	24 years, 9 months	32 years
Height	6 ft 1 in (185 cm)	5 ft 11 1/2 in (182 cm)
Weight	188 lb (85 kg)	187 lb (85 kg)
Style	Orthodox	Orthodox
Recognition	WBA and IBF; Cruiserweight Champion	IBF; No. 1 Ranked Cruiserweight

Result
- Holyfield defeated Ocasio via 11th round TKO

Evander Holyfield vs. Ossie Ocasio was a professional boxing match contested on 15 August 1987 for the WBA and IBF cruiserweight title.

== Background ==
In Holyfield's previous fight, he had defeated Rickey Parkey by third round technical knockout to add the IBF cruiserweight title to the WBA version he had captured the previous year. On the undercard of that fight former WBA cruiserweight champions Ossie Ocasio and Dwight Muhammad Qawi would meet to determine who would be the IBF's number 1 contender, with both men having already signed a contract that guaranteed them a title match against the winner of the Holyfield–Parkey fight. Ocasio would earn a controversial majority decision victory despite spending most of the fight on the defensive, having avoided engaging Qawi, constantly backing away and clinching, leading the referee to eventually deduct a point for excessive holding. However, two judges scored the fight in favor of Ocasio with scores of 96–94 and 95–94 while the third had scored it a draw at 95–95. The decision was so controversial that the IBF decided to have Qawi keep their #1 ranking despite the loss. IBF president Robert W. Lee stated that they did so as they deemed the decision "questionable". The IBF eventually allowed Ocasio to keep their number 1 ranking and Qawi instead would meet former IBF cruiserweight Lee Roy Murphy on the undercard with the winner earning a title shot against the winner of the Holyfield–Ocasio fight.

== The fight ==
The fight lasted into the 11th round, the longest of Holyfield's cruiserweight title defenses. Like he had in his previous fight with Qawi, Ocasio used a defensive approach while Holyfield served as the aggressor throughout and had won 8 of the 10 rounds on one judge's scorecard (100–92) and taken 9 on the other two scorecards (99–94). Holyfield would finally end the fight early in the 11th round when he dropped Ocasio with a left uppercut followed by a right hand. Ocasio was able to continue but Holyfield would continue to attack Ocasio and after Holyfield landed several unanswered combinations with Ocasio against the ropes, the referee stopped the fight and Holyfield was declared the winner by technical knockout at 1:24 of the round.

== Aftermath ==
Following Qawi's victory on the undercard, a rematch with Holyfield was arranged for December.

== Fight card ==
Confirmed bouts:

Weight Class	Weight		vs.		Method	Round	Time	Notes
Cruiserweight	190 lb	Evander Holyfield (c)	def.	Ossie Ocasio	TKO	11/15		^{Note 1}
Cruiserweight	200 lb	Dwight Muhammad Qawi	def.	Lee Roy Murphy	TKO	6/10
Cruiserweight	200 lb	Steve Mormino	def.	Angelo Musone	KO	6/10
Super Bantamweight	122 lb	Fernando Beltran	def	Edgar Roman	PTS	8/8

^Note 1 For WBA and IBF Cruiserweight titles.

== Broadcasting ==
Country	Broadcaster
United Kingdom	BBC
United States	Showtime

Preceded by vs. Rickey Parkey	Evander Holyfield's bouts 15 August 1987	Succeeded by vs. Dwight Muhammad Qawi II
Preceded by vs. Dwight Muhammad Qawi	Ossie Ocasio's bouts 15 August 1987	Succeeded by vs. Pierre Coetzer
