= List of outlaw wrestling promotions =

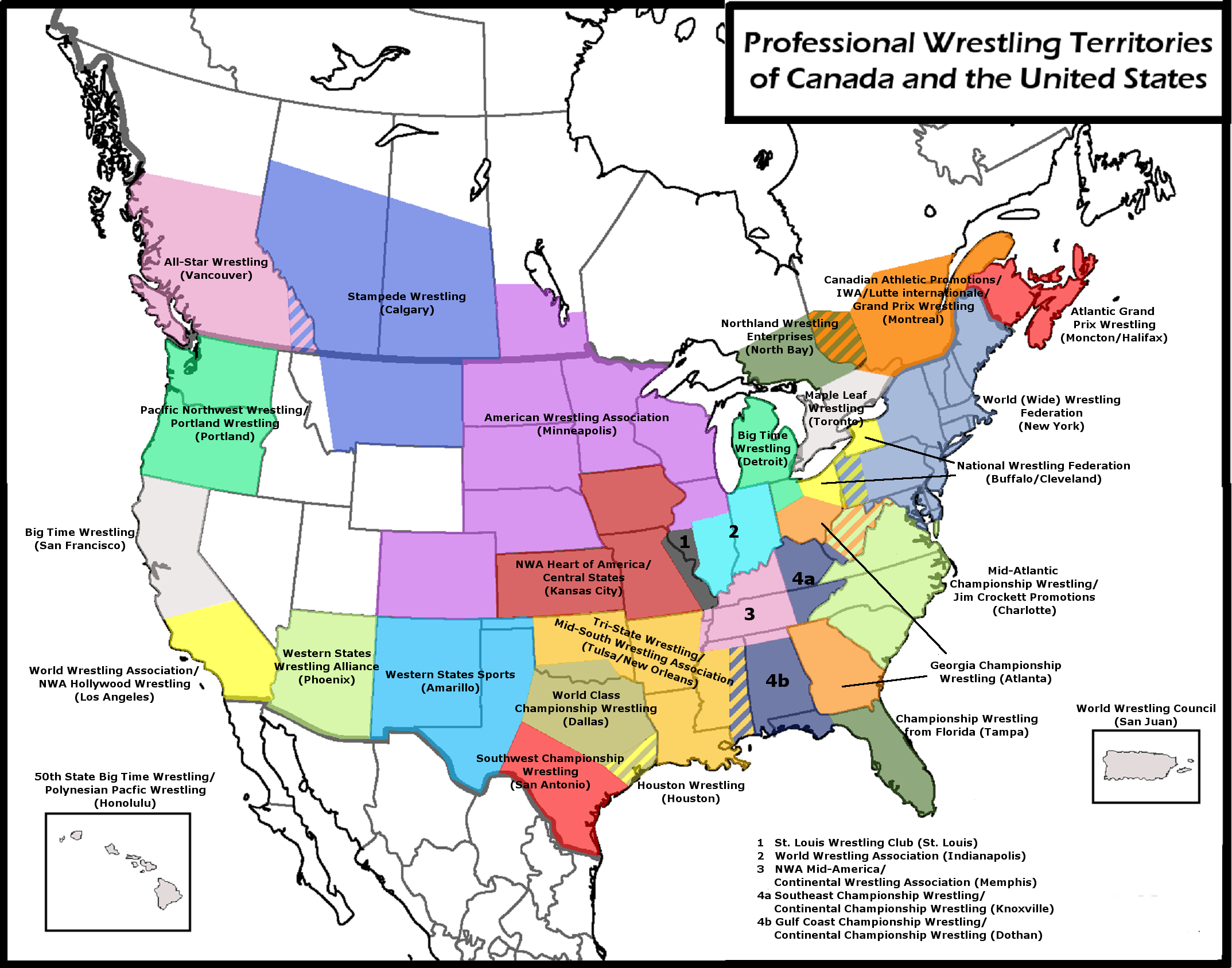
Outlaw promotions typically operated in areas within the NWA territory system.

This is a list of outlaw wrestling promotions in the United States, sorted by regional area, from the 1940s to 1980s. This list does not include pre-1948 groups active during the "Pioneer Era" (1900s–1940s), overseas promotions outside the NWA remit from this period or modern-day "indy promotions". Outlaw promotions are traditionally defined as professional wrestling promotions not affiliated with the National Wrestling Alliance, not recognizing the NWA World Heavyweight Championship and promoting shows in direct competition against NWA regional territories. Wrestlers who had been blackballed from the sport or were winding down their career often found a home with such promotions. These groups were often short-lived as NWA promoters would receive top stars from other members to prevent a potential takeover of a territory.

This was not always the case, however, as some promotions freely cooperated with the NWA promoters (e.g. National Wrestling Federation) while others operated in areas where there was not an established NWA presence. Upon its acrimonious exit from the NWA in summer 1983, the World Wrestling Federation became, in effect, an outlaw promotion. Longtime NWA members, such as Jim Crockett Promotions, the Universal Wrestling Federation and World Class Championship Wrestling, left the organization in order to compete with the WWF during the 1980s wrestling boom. The collapse of the NWA territory system at the end of the decade, the result of the WWF's national expansion, subsequently saw outlaw promotions being replaced by the emerging independent wrestling circuit in North America.

== New England ==
Name	Location	Owner(s)	Years active	Notes
Donald Van Fleet Promotions	Maine	Donald Van Fleet; Louis Lipp	1947-1980	Toured with fairs and carnivals throughout Canada and the United States. Van Fleet's wife, Violet Ray, was the promotion's women's champion. Several wrestling stars got their start travelling with Van Fleet including Bearcat Wright, Butcher Vachon, Billy Hines, Kathy Starr and midget wrestler Little Brutus. In the late-1970s, Van Fleet also operated in Maine and Florida under the "International Wrestling League" banner.
Big Time Wrestling	Boston, Massachusetts	Tony Santos, Sr.	1960–1975	
Century Wrestling Alliance	Boston, Massachusetts	Tony Rumble; Ellen Magliaro	1989–2007	Joined the NWA as NWA New England in 1997. He was the promoter there until his death in 1999. Rumble's wife, Ellen Magliaro ran it until its closure.
International Championship Wrestling	Boston, Massachusetts	Angelo Savoldi; Mario Savoldi	1985–1995	
International Wrestling Federation	Reading, Massachusetts	Killer Kowalski	1979–1996	
New England Wrestling Alliance	Lynn, Massachusetts	Jack Viles	1975–1977	
New England Wrestling Association	New Bedford, Massachusetts	Joe Eugenio	1988–1993	
New England Wrestling Federation	Boston, Massachusetts	Richard Byrnes	1982–1985	Also known as the United States Wrestling Federation.
Northeast Championship Wrestling	New Haven, Connecticut	Tom Janette	1983–1993	
Northeast Wrestling Federation	Wethersfield, Connecticut	Morris "Mushky" Salow	1984–1985	Ran against the World Wrestling Federation during the early-1980s which included a legal fight over the Springfield Civic Center. Bob Backlund, a former WWF World Heavyweight Champion, served as a booker for the group.

== East Coast ==
=== Maryland ===
Name	Location	Owner(s)	Years active	Notes
National Wrestling League	Hagerstown, Maryland	Dick Caricofe, Chris Evans	1988–	Dick Caricofe was the promoter until 2020 when COVID-19 started and Chris Evans took over. Caricofe died on May 14, 2021. Today it is still run by Evans.
Wrestling Independent Network	Baltimore	Ed Zohn, Jeff Capo, Juli Blanton	1992–1993	

=== New Jersey ===
Name	Location	Owner(s)	Years active	Notes
Eastern Wrestling Alliance	New Jersey	Ted Stanley	1985	
Empire Wrestling Federation	New Jersey	Jack Barnett; Enzo Morabito	1983–1985	
Universal Wrestling Alliance	Woodbridge, New Jersey	Dennis Galamb; Jim Ryan	1985–1990	
World Wrestling Association	Woodbury, New Jersey	Larry Sharpe	1989–1998	

=== New York ===
Name	Location	Owner(s)	Years active	Notes
Camp IWF	Brooklyn, New York	Johnny Rodz	1986–1990	
East Coast Wrestling Association	Hauppague, New York		1978-1982?	
International Championship Wrestling	New York	Steve Devito	1989	
International Wrestling Association	Buffalo, New York	Pedro Martínez	1975-1978	
National Wrestling Federation	Buffalo, New York	Pedro Martínez	1970–1974	
New Independent Wrestling Association	Ardsley, New York	Micky DiFate; René Reyes	1984–1985	
Ringside 41	New York City, New York		1974-1976	
Universal Wrestling	Rochester, New York	Roger Reed	1977	
Vega International Wrestling	New York City, New York		1978–1980	
World Wrestling Council	New York/Pennsylvania	Mark Tendler	1986	

=== Pennsylvania ===
Name	Location	Owner(s)	Years active	Notes
Atlantic States Wrestling Alliance	York, Pennsylvania	Ed Zohn	1989–1991	Also known as the Mid-Atlantic Wrestling Alliance.
Atlantic Wrestling Federation	Hanover, Pennsylvania	Max Thrasher	1988–1993	
East Coast Wrestling Federation	Easton, Pennsylvania	Paul Swanger	1983–1984	
North American Wrestling	Pittsburgh, Pennsylvania	Mike Donatelli	1986–1995	
National Independent Championship Wrestling	Lehigh Valley, Pennsylvania	Bob Raskin	1985	
National Wrestling Federation	Lehigh Valley, Pennsylvania	D. C. Drake; Bob Raskin	1986–1994	
Super-Pro Wrestling	Pittsburgh, Pennsylvania	Gene Dargan	1984	
Three Rivers Wrestling Association	Pittsburgh, Pennsylvania	Gene Dargan	1977–1979	
World Wide Wrestling Alliance	Colmar, Pennsylvania	Dino Sanna	1981–	

== Midwest ==
=== Illinois ===
Name	Location	Owner(s)	Years active	Notes
Tri-State Wrestling	Bridgeview	Robert J. Brooks	1989	
Pro Wrestling International	Chicago	Terry Scholl	1984–1995	Also known as Chicago Championship Wrestling.
Southern Illinois Championship Wrestling	Springfield, Illinois	Herb Simmons	1975–1992	Merged with the Mid-Missouri Wrestling Alliance in 1992.
Windy City Wrestling	Chicago	Sam DeCero	1988–2010	

=== Indiana ===
Name	Location	Owner(s)	Years active	Notes
American Wrestling Federation	Danville, Indiana		1989–1992	
International Wrestling Alliance	Indianapolis, Indiana		1989–1990	Merged with the American Wrestling Federation in 1990.
World Wrestling Association	Indianapolis, Indiana	Dick the Bruiser	1971–1990	Ran against the NWA's Detroit office under Ed Farhat from 1971 to 1974.

=== Iowa ===
Name	Location	Owner(s)	Years active	Notes
Midwest Championship Wrestling	Quad Cities, Iowa	Dale Edwards	1984–1986	
Ringside Wrestling	Clinton, Iowa	Rocky Brewer	1982–1983	

=== Michigan ===
Name	Location	Owner(s)	Years active	Notes
Continental Wrestling Association	Detroit, Michigan	Luis Martinez	1980-1981	Broke away from NWA Big Time Wrestling in 1980.
Michigan Championship Wrestling	Lansing, Michigan	Fritz Burns; Ricky Cortez	1977–1994	
Midwest All-Pro	Belleville, Michigan		1988–1993	Merged with Motor City Wrestling in 1993.
National Championship Wrestling	Detroit, Michigan	The Sheik; Ed George	1980–1982	
Superstars of Wrestling	Detroit, Michigan	George Cannon	1976–1983	Also known as the Canadian Wrestling Association in select Canadian markets. Ran against the NWA's Toronto office under Frank Tunney during the mid-1970s but also had a working relationship with the NWA's Detroit office under Ed Farhat.
Universal Wrestling	Detroit, Michigan	Jack Cain; Tony Marino; Terry Sullivan	1974–1976	Also known as International Wrestling in the Toledo, Ohio area. Ran against the NWA's Detroit office under Ed Farhat during the mid-1970s.
Wolverine Wrestling	Lansing, Michigan	Bert Ruby; Fritz Burns; Ricky Cortez	1968–1977	

=== Minnesota ===
Name	Location	Owner(s)	Years active	Notes
Pro Wrestling America	Minneapolis, Minnesota	Eddie Sharkey	1985–1996	Ran against the American Wrestling Association in the mid-to-late 1980s.
Western Wrestling Association	New Brighton, Minnesota	Bill Wasserman; Patricia Brown	1988–	

=== Missouri ===
Name	Location	Owner(s)	Years active	Notes
Greater St. Louis Wrestling	St. Louis, Missouri	Larry Matysik	1983	Split with the NWA's St. Louis office following the retirement of Sam Muchnick.
Mid-Missouri Wrestling Association	St. Louis, Missouri	Tony Casta	1985–	Merged with Southern Illinois Championship Wrestling in 1992.
Henry Rogers Wrestling Promotions	Malden, Missouri	Henry Rogers	1963–1987	Also known as NWWA Championship Wrestling.

=== Ohio ===
Name	Location	Owner(s)	Years active	Notes
Jack Pfefer Promotions	Toledo, Ohio	Jack Pfefer	1949-1951	A one-time member of The Trust, Pfefer exposed the pro wrestling business to the New York Daily Mirror in 1934. He subsequently traveled the U.S. promoting his own world title, particularly in California and Ohio, with a troupe of wrestlers.
American States Wrestling Alliance	Mansfield, Ohio	Charlie Fulton; Mike Collins	1988–	
American Wrestling Federation	Athens, Ohio	John Brammer	1990–1992	
Great Lakes Wrestling Association	Euclid, Ohio	Lou Kokley; Joe Weaver	1989–1994	
Midwest Championship Wrestling	Jackson Center, Ohio	Jim Lancaster	1981–1992	
Ohio Championship Wrestling	Cleveland, Ohio	Henry Robinson	1982	
Ohio Championship Wrestling	Cleveland, Ohio	Tim Hampton; Ken Jugan; Ed Bonzo; J.W. Hawk	1982–1983	
Ohio Championship Wrestling	Ohio	Bob Fradd	1984–1985	
Professional Promotions	Ohio	Bailey Barnes; Wayne Oberton	1976	
Rossco Sports Promotions	Ohio		1950s-1970s	
Tri-State Wrestling Association	Ohio	John Summers	1985–1986	
Universal Wrestling Federation	Dayton, Ohio	Bobby Davis; Don Lewin; Mark Lewin	1971	
World Wide Championship Wrestling	Columbus, Ohio	Angelo Martino	1977	
Wrestling Show Classics	Cincinnati, Ohio	Bobby Davis	1969–1970	Ran against the NWA Detroit office under Ed Farhat for control of northern Ohio. Held the first ever wrestling card at The Spectrum in Philadelphia in the fall of 1969.

=== Wisconsin ===
Name	Location	Owner(s)	Years active	Notes
International Wrestling Promotions	Madison, Wisconsin	Jimmy Demetral	1924–1973	
Mid-West Wrestling	Milwaukee, Wisconsin		1986	
Superstar Wrestling	Milwaukee, Wisconsin	Al Patterson	1982	
United Wrestling Association	Milwaukee, Wisconsin	Al Patterson; Grace Brazil; Sam Wells	1983	
Wisconsin Wrestling Federation	Palmyra, Wisconsin		1984	

== Rocky Mountains ==
Name	Location	Owner(s)	Years active	Notes
Diamond Belt Championship Wrestling	Boise, Idaho	David Gould	1980–1981	
Rocky Mountain Wrestling	Riverton, Wyoming	Bill Ash; Raoul Sanchez	1980–1981	

== Southeast ==
=== Alabama ===
Name	Location	Owner(s)	Years active	Notes
Dixie Wrestling	Boaz, Alabama		1982	
South Wrestling	Huntsville, Alabama	Bobby Dee	1982	
World Wrestling Organization	Mobile, Alabama	Mr. Ito	1988	

=== Florida ===
Name	Location	Owner(s)	Years active	Notes
All-American Championship Wrestling	New Port Richey, Florida	Bob Hamel	1983–2013	
Allied Sports Enterprises	Miami, Florida	Mel Ziegler	1972	Was awarded a five-year contract to hold boxing and wrestling shows at the Miami Beach Auditorium. Ran against the NWA's Miami office under Bill Dundee in 1972.
Championship Wrestling Federation	Tampa, Florida	Boris Malenko	1991	
Global Wrestling Alliance	Sunrise, Florida	Buddy Gilbert	1980-1982	Also known as the World Wrestling Association.
Global Wrestling Alliance	Boca Raton, Florida	Bob Roop; Boris Malenko; Red Roberts	1986–1988	
Independent Pro Wrestling Association	Davie, Florida	Rusty Brooks	1988–2003	
Intercontinental Championship Wrestling Alliance	Tampa, Florida	Ron Slinker	1989–1995	Also known as the International Championship Wrestling Alliance.
International World Wrestling Alliance	Tampa, Florida	Boris Malenko	1982-1984	
Professional Wrestling Alliance		John Davenport	1985	
Professional Wrestling Federation	Tampa, Florida	Dusty Rhodes; Mike Graham; Steve Keirn	1989–1991	
Southern Wrestling Federation	Clermont, Florida	Jerry Grey	1988–1993	
Sunbelt Wrestling	Jacksonville, Florida	Don Curtis; Louie Tillet	1981	Ran against the NWA's Florida office following a dispute with Eddie Graham.
Suncoast Pro Wrestling	Bradenton, Florida	Henry Raines	1989–1993	
Universal Wrestling Association	Panama City, Florida	Lynn Austin	1985	
World League Wrestling	Jacksonville, Florida	Don Curtis	1981	

=== Georgia ===
Name	Location	Owner(s)	Years active	Notes
All South Wrestling Alliance	Atlanta, Georgia	Ann Gunkel	1972–1974	Ran against Georgia Championship Wrestling after her husband's death.
All Star Championship Wrestling	Macon, Georgia	Grady Odom	1985	
American Wrestling Federation			1984	
American Wrestling Federation	Bainbridge, Georgia	Frankie Cain	1986	
Deep South Wrestling	McDonough, Georgia	Jody Hamilton	1986–1988	
International Wrestling League	Atlanta, Georgia	Jim Wilson; Thunderbolt Patterson	1974	Ran against Georgia Championship Wrestling in the mid-1970s. Filed an anti-trust lawsuit against the NWA in 1976.
Southern Championship Wrestling	Atlanta, Georgia	Jerry Blackwell; Joe Pedicino	1988–1990	
Star Cavalcade Wrestling	Bainbridge, Georgia	Frankie Cain; Lowell Takles; Sue Takles	1988	
Star Wrestling	Bainbridge, Georgia	Frankie Cain	1982	
World League Wrestling	Atlanta, Georgia	Lars Anderson	1979–1982	

=== Kentucky ===
Name	Location	Owner(s)	Years active	Notes
All-Star Wrestling	Paducah, Kentucky	Phil Golden	1972–1974	
International Championship Wrestling	Lexington, Kentucky	Angelo Poffo	1978–1984	Ran against Continental Wrestling Association in Kentucky and assisted fellow outlaw promotion All-Star Wrestling in its war against the NWA-affiliated Southeastern Championship Wrestling in Knoxville, Tennessee.
International Wrestling Association			1984	
Mountain Wrestling Association	Georgetown, Kentucky	Dale Mann	1979–1995	
Pro Wrestling Promotions	Georgetown, Kentucky		1981-1982	Worked with Nick Gulas before his retirement in 1982

=== Mississippi ===
Name	Location	Owner(s)	Years active	Notes
International Championship Wrestling	Jackson, Mississippi	George Culkin; Gil Culkin	1977–1979	Ran against NWA Tri-State during the late 1970s, and briefly became an affiliate of the American Wrestling Association, before merging with Mid-South Wrestling.

=== North Carolina ===
Name	Location	Owner(s)	Years active	Notes
Atlantic Coast Wrestling	Mooresville, North Carolina	Nelson Royal	1988–1991	
Carolina Championship Wrestling Alliance	Smithfield, North Carolina	Dexter Justice-Smithfield; Glenwood Crocker; Jerry Kennett; Jim Massingale; Sandy Lee	1987–1997	
Eastern Wrestling Association	Lexington, North Carolina	Johnny Hunter	1974–1989	
International Wrestling Alliance	Greensboro, North Carolina	Ken Spence	1979–1997	
North American Wrestling Alliance	Burlington, North Carolina	James Wells	1980–1999	
North American Wrestling Alliance	Kings Mountain, North Carolina	Buddy Porter	1982–1995	
North American Wrestling Alliance	Lenoir, North Carolina	Mark Henderson	1982–2000	
South Atlantic Pro Wrestling	Charlotte, North Carolina	George Scott; Paul Jones	1990–1992	
Southern Championship Wrestling	Lenoir, North Carolina	Chief Jay Eagle	1983–1990	

=== South Carolina ===
Name	Location	Owner(s)	Years active	Notes
Atlantic Coast Wrestling	Columbia, South Carolina	Ira Parks	1981–1990	
Big Time Promotions	Inman, South Carolina	Dale Stepp	1982–1992	

=== Tennessee ===
Name	Location	Owner(s)	Years active	Notes
All-Star Championship Wrestling	Knoxville, Tennessee	Bob Roop; Bob Orton, Jr. Boris Malenko; Ron Garvin; Ron Wright	1979–1980	Split from Southeastern Championship Wrestling following a dispute with Ron Fuller. Merged with Lexington, Kentucky-based International Championship Wrestling in 1980.
All Star Championship Wrestling	Knoxville, Tennessee	Bill Needham	1990–1992	
Continental Wrestling Federation	Knoxville, Tennessee	Ron Fuller	1988–1989	
Eastern Championship Wrestling	Knoxville, Tennessee		1981	Short-lived group that attempted to run Knoxville following the ASW/SCW promotional war.
Independent Wrestlers Union	Franklin, Tennessee		1982	
Mid-South Wrestling Association	Memphis, Tennessee	Russ Edwards	1982	Also known as Mid-South Pro Wrestling.
Southern States Championship Wrestling	Knoxville, Tennessee	James Strange	1986–1991	
USA Wrestling	Knoxville, Tennessee	David Woods; Robert Fuller	1987–1988	
Universal Wrestling Association	Knoxville, Tennessee	Buddy Lee; Lou Thesz	1976	Ran against NWA Mid-America following a dispute with Nick Gulas.

=== Virginia ===
Name	Location	Owner(s)	Years active	Notes
All-American Wrestling	Rye Cove, Virginia	Denny Million; Jerry Vanover	1988–1996	
American Championship Wrestling	Hillsville, Virginia	Bob Ross	1978–	
United Wrestling Association	Castlewood, Virginia	Mike Samson	1989–1995	
Virginia Wrestling Association	Richmond, Virginia	Dave Leehy	1988–1993	

=== West Virginia ===
Name	Location	Owner(s)	Years active	Notes
American International Wrestling	Oak Hill, West Virginia		1954–1977	
American International Wrestling	Logan, West Virginia	Larry Bowling	1989	
North American Championship Wrestling			1980–1985	
Three Rivers Wrestling		Gene Dargan; Ken Jugan	1977–1979	Merged with the Knoxville, Tennessee-based All-Star Wrestling in September 1979. Relocated to Pittsburgh, Pennsylvania after All-Star's close.
United Wrestling Alliance			1982	

== Southwest ==
=== Arizona ===
Name	Location	Owner(s)	Years active	Notes
Don Wilson Promotions	Phoenix, Arizona	Don Wilson	1974	Co-founder of the Wrestling Fans International Association, Wilson was forced to shut down when a rival promoter threatened him at gunpoint.
International Wrestling Union	Phoenix, Arizona	Marcial Bovee	1983	
Universal Wrestling Association	Phoenix, Arizona	Barry Bernsten	1972–1974	
Western States Wrestling Alliance	Phoenix, Arizona	Barry Bernsten; David Rose; Marcial Bovee	1974–1991	
World Athletic Association	Phoenix, Arizona	Al Fenn; Ernie Mohammed	1954–1973	

=== Oklahoma ===
Name	Location	Owner(s)	Years active	Notes
Universal Wrestling Federation	Tulsa, Oklahoma	Bill Watts	1979–1987	Originally known as Mid-South Wrestling from 1979 to 1986. Left the NWA in 1979 to compete against the World Wrestling Federation.

=== Texas ===
Name	Location	Owner(s)	Years active	Notes
Dallas Wrestling Club	Dallas, Texas	Ed McLemore	1940–1968	Ran against the NWA's Dallas office under Norman Clark from 1952 to 1953. He later partnered with Fritz Von Erich and took over the territory as NWA Big Time Wrestling.
North American Wrestling Alliance	Dallas–Fort Worth, Texas	Killer Tim Brooks	1990–1991	
Southwest Championship Wrestling	San Antonio, Texas	Joe Blanchard	1978–1985	Ran against NWA Big Time Wrestling in the late-1970s.
Texas All-Pro Wrestling	Houston, Texas	Tugboat Taylor	1989–1995	
Texas All-Star Wrestling	San Antonio, Texas	Fred Behrend	1985–1986	
Texas Wrestling Federation	Dallas, Texas	Gary Hart	1990–1991	
Wild West Wrestling	Dallas–Fort Worth, Texas	Ken Mantell	1987–1988	Ran against World Class Championship Wrestling in 1987.
West Texas Wrestling Association			1983	
World Class Championship Wrestling	Dallas–Fort Worth, Texas	Fritz Von Erich	1986–1990	Originally known as NWA Big Time Wrestling from 1966 to 1982. Left NWA in 1986 to compete against the World Wrestling Federation.

== West Coast ==
Name	Location	Owner(s)	Years active	Notes
All-California Championship Wrestling	San Bernardino, California	Joe Palumbo	1987–1989	
American Wrestling Alliance	San Francisco, California	Roy Shire	1961–1981	Ran against the NWA's Los Angeles office under Joe Malewicz. After running Malewicz out of business, Shire joined NWA in 1968 as "NWA Big Time Wrestling".
Bay Area Wrestling	San Francisco, California	Woody Farmer	1989–1992	
California Pro Wrestling	Los Angeles	Karl Lauer	1983–1990	
Golden State Wrestling	Southern California	Bill Carr	1987	
International Wrestling Federation	Culver City, California	Eric Shaw	1986–1990	
Oregon Wrestling Federation	Portland, Oregon	Billy Jack Haynes	1988	Ran against Portland Wrestling in the summer of 1988.
Pacific Coast Championship Wrestling	Hayward, California	Jerry Monti	1991–1992	
Pacific Coast Crown Championship Wrestling	California	DA Thunder	1986–1987	
Pacific Coast Wrestling Promotions	Los Angeles, California		1976–1977	Ran against NWA Hollywood Wrestling in 1976.
Superstar Championship Wrestling	Seattle, Washington	Dean Silverstone	1973–1978	
West Coast Wrestling Alliance	Fresno, California	Gloria Gale Lane	1991–1992	
Western States Alliance	Southern California	Antone Leone	1981–1982	Also known as Western Championship Wrestling
Western States Wrestling Association	San Bernardino, California	Billy Anderson; Jesse Hernandez	1988–1991	
Worldwide Wrestling Associates	Los Angeles	Mike LeBell	1958–1982	Originally known as North American Wrestling Alliance from 1958 to 1961. Rejoined the NWA in 1968 as "NWA Hollywood Wrestling".
