= International Championship Wrestling (Mississippi) =

Former wrestling promotion

- Acronym: ICW
- Founded: 1977
- Defunct: 1979
- Style: Rasslin'
- Headquarters: Jackson, Mississippi, U.S.
- Founder: George Culkin
- Owner(s): George Culkin; Gil Culkin
- Parent: Mississippi Wrestling Enterprise
- Sister: American Wrestling Association (1978-1979)
- Formerly: AWA International Championship Wrestling

International Championship Wrestling (also known as AWA International Championship Wrestling or AWA Mississippi) was a professional wrestling promotion that held events in the Mid-South area of the United States from September 1977 to August 1979, when it was run by George and Gil Culkin. The promotion was based in Jackson, Mississippi, with offices in Vicksburg, Mississippi.

Initially an "outlaw" wrestling promotion, the Culkins waged a near two-year promotional war against NWA Tri-State over the National Wrestling Alliance's Mid-South territory then controlled by Leroy McGuirk and Bill Watts. Part of their efforts to combat McGuirk including filing an anti-trust lawsuit against the NWA promoter. The company was briefly affiliated with the American Wrestling Association, which saw Nick Bockwinkel defend the AWA World Heavyweight Championship in Mississippi for the first time, before joining the NWA in mid-1979. The Culkins eventually allied with Bill Watts after he broke away from McGuirk and their promotion merged with Mid-South Wrestling.

== History and overview ==
=== Formation ===
George C. Culkin formed the promotion in the early fall of 1977 upon leaving Leroy McGuirk's Championship Wrestling. He brought in his son, George Gilman "Gil" Culkin, as a partner. The promotion was booked by wrestler Frankie Cain. The first events and TV tapings were held in September and October 1977. Lou Thesz, a former 15-time world champion, was the first ICW United States Heavyweight Champion. On October 26, 1977, a tournament final to crown the inaugural ICW Southern Tag Team Champions was held at the Mississippi State Fairgrounds Coliseum in Jackson, Mississippi. A secondary singles title, the ICW Missouri State Heavyweight Championship, was created after a 16-year-old Terry Gordy defeated Bill Ash in tournament final on January 14, 1978, in Greenwood, Mississippi. Don Fargo was also billed as the "World Brass Knuckles Champion" during the year. Additionally, the promotion recognized Ann Casey as the NWA U.S. Women's Champion and Natasha & Beverly Shade as NWA U.S. Women's Tag Team Champions.

The Culkin's weekly TV show was broadcast live on Friday nights at the Greenwood Sportatorium. George Culkin had built the venue specifically for this purpose while promoting for McGurk years earlier. Matches from these events were hosted by sports commentator Johnny Cascio and aired on WABG (Channel 6). Culkin took great care in developing a loyal fan base for the live audience at the TV tapings which included offering a special "dark match" to open the event. Cascio claimed it was WABG-TV's highest rated regular program and "on Saturday afternoons, 72 percent of all televisions in use within the WABG viewing area were tuned to the show".

=== Territorial reach ===
This was Michael Hayes, Terry Gordy, Kimala, and myself first "real" territory. We had TV all over the state. We had weekly cards at The Mississippi Coast Coliseum in Biloxi, The Jackson Coliseum, Vicksburg, and in Greenwood where we taped our TV. We worked six days a week. There are very few Mississippi National Guard Armories and High School Gyms that I have never been to.
If it wasn't for George, his son Gil Culkin, and Frankie "The Great Memphisto" Cain, I certainly would not have accomplished what I have in my 25+ years in the industry.

— Percy Pringle (2002)

The Culkins controlled the entire state of Mississippi during the company's two years in operation. Based in the state capitol of Jackson, ICW used the Mississippi State Fairgrounds Coliseum as its home arena. Its weekly television show, which had replaced NWA Tri-State's TV programming, was broadcast live from the Greenwood Sportatorium and syndicated throughout the state. ICW's event tours also included high school gyms, national guard armories and small arenas throughout the Mississippi Delta and Gulf Coast regions. At the height of the promotion's popularity, it managed to run a number of shows at the Mississippi Coast Coliseum in Biloxi, Mississippi.

=== Notable talent ===
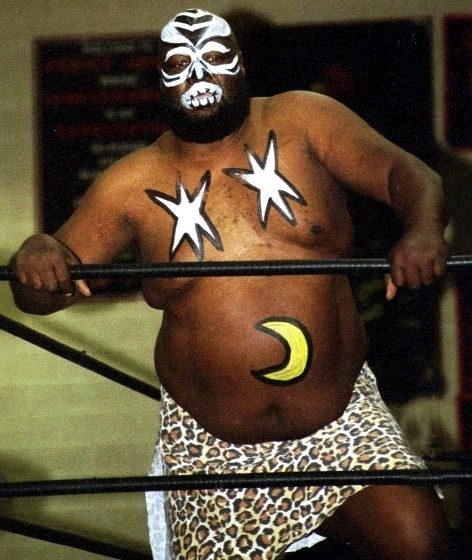
Kamala was one of the younger wrestlers featured on ICW

The promotion featured a number of wrestlers who were regulars in the southern wrestling scene and was the birthplace of both The Fabulous Freebirds and The Slapawitz Syndicate. The latter group, managed by Izzy Slapawitz, was featured heavily throughout their near six-month run as they worked storyline feuds with Joey Rossi, Percy Pringle and The Mongolians (Tio and Tapu). In addition to Rossi, Pringle and Slapawitz, ICW also featured a number of younger wrestlers who had not yet made their mark in a major wrestling territory, including Kamala (then known as James "Sugar Bear" Harris), King Cobra, Johnny Mantell, Nightmare Danny Davis, Rip Rogers, Troy Graham (The Dream Machine), Michael Hayes and Terry Gordy.

Despite being an "outlaw" group, the Culkins were also able to bring in mainstream talent from world champion Lou Thesz to veteran NWA journeymen such as Billy Screaming Eagle, The Missouri Mauler, Reggie Siki, The Spoiler, and Phil Watson (Whipper Watson Jr.). The promotion also used wrestlers from NWA Mid-America and NWA Gulf Coast Championship Wrestling.

=== Style and controversy ===
The Culkins presented a hard-hitting brand of Southern-style rasslin' similar to NWA Tri-State. Gil Culkin and other ICW personalities have credited Frankie Cain for ICW's success citing his creative mind and keen eye for spotting talent. Under Cain's tenure as booker, he created or refined the "gimmicks" for many of the promotion's homegrown stars. Percy Pringle was among the first of these young wrestlers. He first appeared as last minute replacement to wrestle Doctor X at a house show in Vicksburg. Cain was impressed by the young man's performance and invited him back the following night in Biloxi to make his debut as "Percy Pringle III". Paired with The Mongolians (Tio and Tapu), he became ICW's main "heel" manager for most of the company's existence. Under Pringle's leadership, The Mongolians won the tag team titles a record four times and Mongolian #1 even held the promotion's heavyweight belt on two occasions.

In late-1977, Cain convinced Culkin to bring in then 16-year-old Terry Gordy after seeing him wrestle in the Memphis territory. He was also the first person to put Michael Hayes and Terry Gordy together as a tag team in February 1978. Hayes, who had initially worked for the Culkins as a masked wrestler, had debuted as an arrogant, flamboyant "heel" wrestler. Hayes considers ICW the birth of The Fabulous Freebirds due to the close friendship he and Gordy developed while working for the Culkins. Mike Boyette and The Islanders were also involved in shaping their in-ring personas. It was Hayes' idea to turn Gordy "heel" in October and they soon made a name for themselves battling Pork Chop Cash and King Cobra. The angle, while popular with the fans, was cut short in December 1978 when Hayes got into an argument with Gil Culkin over a house show payoff in Natchez, Mississippi. The team left ICW over the dispute. Although having departed under bad circumstances, Hayes credited the Culkins for giving both of them their first big break. He also believed that the promotion's wide television exposure and 6-day wrestling schedule provided an excellent spot for young talent to hone their craft.

The ICW roster often made the papers in Mississippi. In November 1977, "Lord" Michael Hayes was featured in The Yazoo Herald. The promotion garnered some more publicity the following month when The Great Mephisto and Grizzly Smith were arrested by police after fighting in the streets of downtown Jackson, Mississippi. Near the end of Pringle's run in ICW, he was arrested in Laurel, Mississippi after assaulting a fan with his cane. In 1979, Izzy Slapawitz arrived in ICW and quickly formed his own "heel" stable with Rip Rogers and The Japanese Wrecking Crew (Oki Shikina and Mr. Fugi).] One of the first targets of the Slapawitz Syndicate was Joey Rossi who was harassed by the group, and Slapawitz in particular, for several weeks while the Culkins were running shows in Vicksburg, Mississippi. Slapawitz was unexpectedly forced into a bout with Rossi which led to the manager wrestling his first-ever match in the territory. Unlike the typical "cowardly" wrestling manager, Slapawitz aggressively brawled with Rossi and was disqualified in their best two of three falls match. The bout was covered by the Vicksburg's daily newspaper with a front-page story entitled "Tougher Then They Thought". Len Rossi, one of NWA Mid-America's most popular stars, came out of retirement to help his brother during the one-sided feud.

The Slapawitz Syndicate then turned their attention to Percy Pringle's stable setting up a rare "heel vs. heel" feud which became one of the company's biggest storylines. Slapawitz and Pringle faced each other in six-man tag team matches as well as in a variety of specialty matches throughout Mississippi. One of their most infamous matches was a Texas Bull Rope match at the Mississippi Coliseum in Jackson, Mississippi that ended in a double-countout when the brawl spilled outside of the ring and into the backstage area. The feud concluded the following week at the Mississippi Coliseum with Slapawitz and The Japanese Wrecking Crew defeating Pringle and The Mongolians in a "Loser Leaves Town" Steel Cage match; due to the pre-match stipulations, the Slapawitz Syndicate won the heavyweight and tag team titles in addition to $5,000.

While the Mississippi Coliseum was the bigger venue, ICW also drew large crowds at the nearby Greenwood Sportatorium where the weekly TV tapings were held. It was not unusual for these shows to be standing room only as a number of memorable events took place in the building. A bout between Oki Shikina and Johnny Mantell turned into a wild brawl that ended up in the parking lot, then across U.S. Highway 49, where they briefly stopped traffic, before eventually returning to the building. Izzy Slapowitz's debut on ICW television also caused some controversy. He was initially introduced as a shady businessman who owned a chain of pawn shops throughout New York City. The Southern audience, however, misheard "pawn shop" for "porn shop" due Slapowitz's thick New York accent. The incident almost got the promotion kicked of local TV and that aspect of the character was quickly dropped. It is believed that the show's master tapes were destroyed when the old Greenwood TV station burned down on March 11, 1986. According to Gil Culkin no footage survives from ICW's television broadcasts.

During the "kayfabe-era", it was commonplace for wrestlers to keep the nature of their business a secret even from immediate family members. When Kamala (then known as "Sugar Bear Harris") joined Percy Pringle's stable in late-1978, the heel manager took pleasure in embarrassing his newest recruit such as changing his name to "Ugly Bear Harris". Whenever Kamala lost a match on television, Pringle would make him bend over and "plant [a] foot on his backside" and on one occasion slapped him in the face. Kamala's wife would become upset at her husband whenever she saw him being mistreated by Pringle on TV. After "winning" a $5,000 battle royal, he arrived home to discover that she had thrown a party and became upset when he failed to collect the cash prize.

=== War with the NWA ===
The NWA's Mid-South territory under Leroy McGuirk originally consisted of Oklahoma, Arkansas and Louisiana. By the mid-1970s, it had expanded to include Mississippi and parts of Missouri and East Texas. George Culkin had promoted the Mississippi end of the Mid-South territory since the late-1960s. A falling out over money, however, caused Culkin to turn against McGuirk and shut the longtime promoter out of Mississippi. McGuirk's booker Bill Watts later expressed surprise at Culkins' decision given that his crew of wrestlers sometimes traveled directly from the NWA's Florida territory and sold out the Jackson Coliseum on several occasions. Watts also employed Culkin's nephew, Jack Curtis Jr., who served as his right-hand man.

As a longtime promoter for McGuirk, George Culkin was well placed to take control of the Mississippi wrestling territory. He had close political connections with local officials., much like Bill Watts did in neighboring Louisiana, which made it very difficult for potential rivals to run shows in the area. Culkin, an ex-wrestler himself, also enjoyed a degree of celebrity among local wrestling fans having been part of a popular tag team with half-brother Jack Curtis during the late-1940s and 1950s. ICW's weekly show replaced "Leroy McGuirk's Championship Wrestling" on WABG (Channel 6) and WJTV (Channel 12), and was eventually syndicated throughout the state of Mississippi. Jack Curtis Jr., who would represent the NWA in Mississippi, got ABC affiliate WAPT (Channel 16) to air McGuirk's show on a Saturday night time slot. Curtis Jr. ran smaller venues in and around Jackson though NWA Tri-State eventually entered head-to-head competition with the Culkins on Wednesday nights. Because Watts did not have access to the Coliseum, he would often attempt to load his cards with as many NWA stars as possible. According to former NWA Tri-State ring announcer Jeff Steele, however, the lack of suitable venues damaged the promotion's credibility with local fans which was "the toughest part of the war for Watts". ICW and the NWA engaged in a price war with the Culkins lowering their ticket prices by $1 for all seats in order to undercut Watt's shows. Global Wrestling News reported that ICW appeared "to have the upper hand" by the end of the year.

A handful of McGuirk's wrestlers chose to join the Culkins including Bill Ash, Doctor X, Gene Lewis, Mr. Ito and Pork Chop Cash. Bill Watts was so upset at Doctor X's jumping to ICW that he revealed the masked wrestler's real life identity on "Championship Wrestling". A future Mid-South champion, Ernie Ladd, was one of ICW's top "heel" performers during its first year. Ladd eventually returned to the Tri-States territory, however, he remained loyal to Culkin and finished up his dates despite early attempts by Watts to lure him away. The Spoiler was another NWA star who worked for the Culkins. Gil Culkin later praised the masked wrestler for his integrity during the Mississippi promotional wars.

When Grizzly Smith was fired by Watts over a wage dispute, he went to work for the Culkins and became involved in booking for the promotion. Smith's involvement with ICW included a short-lived reunion of The Kentuckians with his former tag team partner Luke Brown. However, Smith continued to stay in close contact with Watts. He encouraged Smith to remain with ICW and agreed to pay him $400 a week while employed for the Culkins. The rival promoter hoped "to bleed [George Culkin] dry" while Smith intentionally sabotaged ICW's shows with poor booking decisions.

The promotion spent several weeks building up a feud between Smith and The Great Mephisto. In December 1977, the two men were arrested for a wild brawl in downtown Jackson which got significant publicity in The Clarion-Ledger. The blow off was supposed to take place at the Mississippi State Fairgrounds Industry Building on March 8, 1978, in a "Loser Leaves Mississippi" Steel Cage match. On the night of the event, however, Smith failed to appear. Instead of cancelling the match, Mephisto put out an open challenge which was accepted by Terry Gordy. Smith reappeared in NWA Tri-State's TV show a week or two later, and subsequently worked with Jack Curtis Jr. as a matchmaker in Louisiana.

After NWA Tri-State began raiding ICW talent, George Culkin filed an anti-trust lawsuit. This was not the first time the NWA was accused of operating as a monopoly. Culkin's case was hard to prove, however, as ICW and the NWA had only competed against each other in Jackson while the Culkins had free rein virtually everywhere else in the state. Bill Watts has claimed that while he felt Culkin had no chance of winning the heavy legal fees associated with fighting the case could cause serious financial problems for them. According to Junkyard Dog biographer Greg Klein, there was not much of the Mississippi wrestling territory worth fighting over outside of Jackson.

The promotion had a brief association with the American Wrestling Association (AWA), which had broken away from the NWA in 1960, and recognized then AWA World Heavyweight Champion Nick Bockwinkel as the "real" world champion. Bockwinkel, accompanied by then manager Bobby "The Brain" Heenan, traveled to Mississippi several times to defend his title. His bout against Pork Chop Cash in November 1978 lasted over an hour with Gene Lewis as the special referee. On his last recorded trip to Jackson, Bockwinkle faced Mongolian #1 in March 1979. Percy Pringle's hair was put on the line in exchange for a shot at the world champion. McGuirk and Watts brought in Harley Race to defend the NWA World Heavyweight Championship in the state capitol during this period. Despite this, former ICW manager Izzy Slapowitz claimed that the Culkins were holding their own in Jackson up until their last year in operation.

=== Demise ===
In the summer of 1979, McGuirk and Watts split up and the Tri-State territory was divided in half. Watts took control of Louisiana and Arkansas while McGuirk kept the rest. When Watts demanded control of Louisiana, McGuirk reportedly replied "Then you'll take Mississippi too, with Culkin and that antitrust suit!". Agreeing to this condition, Watts reached out to George Culkin hoping to make a deal:

The first thing I needed to do once I was on my own and had officially formed Mid-South Wrestling was go to Mississippi and straighten things out with George Culkin. I called him and asked to meet with him. We talked it out and decided to work together again. It was the best thing for both of us. He wasn't successful in competing against me in wrestling and the lawsuit wasn't going well for him either. We met with all the lawyers in the case in Jackson, Mississippi, and his lawyers started blowing up when I told them the suit was over. I went over and shut the door of the office where we were meeting and told them, "You fat, overstuffed, overpriced legal vultures, sit down. George and I are here because we want to be. We're not letting you guys use the big words, blow up and extend this to charge up triple fees. You all are sitting here until you hammer out the letter that ends this antitrust suit and reestablishes George and my partnership."

— Bill Watts, The Cowboy and the Cross: The Bill Watts Story (2006)

The Culkins had joined the National Wrestling Alliance by this time. They were not present at the NWA's annual convention in August, however, it was announced at the meeting that their lawsuit with McGuirk had been settled. ICW's final show was held at the Mississippi Coliseum on August 18, 1979, as a co-promotional event with Bill Watts and Dusty Rhodes vs. Ole Anderson and Ivan Koloff as the main attraction. On the undercard, Mike George defeated King Cobra to unify the ICW Mississippi State Championship with the NWA Tri-State version. A month later, Watts started Mid-South Wrestling with George Culkin as the local promoter. In December 1979, Culkin and Watts formed a new parent company, "Championship Wrestling of Mississippi", headquartered in Vicksburg, Mississippi. The Culkins remained with Watts for several more years. After Bill Watts closed his promotion in 1987, George Culkin continued promoting shows in Mississippi for World Class Championship Wrestling and the Continental Wrestling Federation before retiring the following year.

== Mississippi Wrestling Memories ==
Starting in 2008, Gil Culkin became active in the internet wrestling community as a blogger reminiscing about his experiences as an "outlaw" promoter and pro wrestling history in Mississippi. In February 2018, he started "Mississippi Wrestling Memories" on Facebook.com which serves as a tribute website for ICW. He has also used the group to bring attention to former ICW alumni who have fallen on hard times including, most notably, supporting GoFundMe campaigns for Frankie Cain (The Great Mephisto) and Kamala. In February 2019, Culkin donated the name and address book used by ICW to the Professional Wrestling Hall of Fame and Museum. In 2020, Culkin authored a book entitled "The Mississippi Wrestling Territory: The Untold Story" which was released by Amazon.com.

== Championships and programming ==
| Championship | Date of entry | First champion | Date retired | Final champion | Years active | Notes |
|---|---|---|---|---|---|---|
| ICW United States Heavyweight Championship | April 1978 | Lou Thesz | August 1979 | Mr. Fugi | >1 | The title was retired after ICW merged with Mid-South Wrestling in the summer of 1979. |
| ICW Mississippi Heavyweight Championship | January 14, 1978 | Terry Gordy | August 18, 1979 | Mike George | >1 | The title was retired after ICW merged with Mid-South Wrestling in the summer of 1979, and unified with the Mid-South version of the championship. |
| ICW Southern Tag Team Championship | October 1977 | Unknown | August 1979 | Pork Chop Cash and The Missouri Mauler | >2 | The title was retired after ICW merged with Mid-South Wrestling in the summer of 1979. |

Championships recognized by ICW

| Championship | Champion | Notes |
|---|---|---|
| AWA World Heavyweight Championship | Nick Bockwinkel | The world title of the American Wrestling Association. It was defended in the promotion from 1978 to 1979. |
| NWA United States Women's Championship | Ann Casey | The women's championship of the National Wrestling Alliance. It was defended in the NWA's Mid-America and Gulf Coast territories throughout the 1970s, and in ICW during 1978. |
| NWA United States Women's Tag Team Championship | Natasha and Beverly Shade | The women's tag team championship of the National Wrestling Alliance. It was defended in the promotion during 1978. |

=== Programming ===
| Programming | Notes |
|---|---|
| International Championship Wrestling | (1977 1979) Syndicated, also broadcast live on WABG-TV. |

== See also ==
- List of outlaw wrestling promotions
