= Michael Spinks vs. Dwight Muhammad Qawi =

Boxing match

The Brawl for it All
- Date: March 18, 1983
- Venue: Atlantic City Convention Hall in Atlantic City, New Jersey
- Title(s) on the line: WBA, WBC, The Ring and lineal light heavyweight titles

Tale of the tape
Boxer	Michael Spinks	Dwight Muhammad Qawi
Nickname	"Jinx"	"The Camden Buzzsaw"
Hometown	St. Louis, Missouri	Lindenwold, New Jersey
Pre-fight record	22–0	19–1–1
Height	6 ft 2 1/2 in (189 cm)	5 ft 6 in (168 cm)
Weight	173 lb (78 kg)	174 lb (79 kg)
Style	Orthodox	Orthodox
Recognition	WBA light heavyweight champion	WBC and The Ring light heavyweight champion

Result
- Spinks defeated Muhammad Qawi via Unanimous decision

Michael Spinks vs. Dwight Muhammad Qawi, billed as "The Brawl for it All", was a professional boxing match contested on March 18, 1983 for the Undisputed Light Heavyweight Championship.

== Background ==
"The Brawl for it All" was a long-awaited match. Qawi had defeated Matthew Saad Muhammad for the WBC world title, and Spinks had defeated Eddie Mustafa Muhammad for the WBA world title. Both Qawi and Spinks had defeated some top name challengers during the course of their championship runs; boxing fans and experts alike clamoured for the fight to take place.

The fight had some dramatic backgrounds: two months before, Spinks' longtime girlfriend, who was the mother of his only daughter, had died after a car accident. On fight night, Spinks' two-year-old daughter, unaware that her mother had died, walked into Spinks' locker room and asked when would her mother show up to see the fight. Spinks cried, but he was able to keep his composure.

Qawi had been better known to most fans as Dwight Braxton. He still had not talked much in public about his name change and his Muslim faith. About seven days before the fight, he revealed that his doctors had recommended him not to fight, as he had been diagnosed with pneumonia. This diagnosis put the fight in jeopardy, but he decided to go on with the fight.

The bout was carried live on HBO Boxing. The bout was fought at Atlantic City, New Jersey, near Qawi's hometown of Philadelphia, Pennsylvania. Some fans and critics would later say that the fight did not live up to its name, because they were expecting an action packed fight.

== The fight ==
Spinks surprised many observers by taking a technical stance from the beginning, and Qawi, in his typical style, charged forward, chasing Spinks. Rounds one to six were, in the eyes of many, including the judges, dominated by Spinks . By the middle rounds, however, Qawi began to untrack, and, in round eight, Spinks suffered two falls: the first one was ruled a slip, but the second one was a controversial knockdown. As Qawi stepped on one of Spinks' feet, Qawi landed a blow to Spinks' body. Left without any choice (because Qawi had landed a punch the moment before Spinks fell), the referee, Larry Hazzard, issued an eight-second count after Spinks rose, making it officially Spinks' first career fall. The knockdown was controversial, because many continue to argue that, had Qawi not stepped on Spinks' foot, Qawi would have never been credited with knocking Spinks down.

Qawi, perhaps because of his pneumonia, tired somewhat and backtracked during rounds eleven to thirteen, rounds which would later become key rounds in the fight.

Suspecting that he was behind on points, Qawi became more aggressive in rounds fourteen and fifteen. He staggered Spinks with two rights towards the end of round fourteen, but could not finish up his foe as the bell rang soon afterwards. Qawi came swinging from every angle at the start of the last round, probably desperate to score a knockout. But Spinks made him miss frequently, bobbing his head and trying to keep his distance from Qawi. (In 2006, Qawi bitterly told Sports Illustrated that Spinks "ran like a thief" during the fight.)

== Decision ==
After the fight ended, the scorecards were read: judge Tony Castellano had scored the fight 144–140, judge Tony Perez had it at 144–141, and judge Frank Cappuccino had it also at 144–141, all in favor of Spinks.

The closeness of the decision made fans write to magazines and newspapers, asking for a rematch. The rematch came very close to happening; it was set for September 27 of 1984, but it was cancelled after Qawi was injured during training, three weeks before the fight.

== Aftermath ==
Spinks went on to become the first world light heavyweight champion in boxing history to go up in weight and win the world heavyweight title. Qawi, for his part, went up to the cruiserweight division, where he reigned as WBA world champion from 1985 to 1986.

Both fighters are now members of the International Boxing Hall of Fame.

== Undercard ==
Confirmed bouts:

- Johnny Davis KO9 Jerry Martin
- Ubaldo Sacco W10 Willie Rodriguez
- Elio Diaz KO5 Bruce Finch
- James Shuler KO4 Inocencio de la Rosa
- Jose Maria Flores Burlon KO3 Dornell Wigfall
- Leon Taylor W6 Bashiru Ali
- Najee Ullah W4 Ken Ringo
- Earl Grant W4 Mauro Fernandes da Cruz

== Broadcasting ==
Country	Broadcaster
United States	HBO
