= Al Fenn =

Al Fenn was a boxing promoter and trainer from Phoenix, Arizona. He was also the president of the Arizona Golden Gloves Association. He served as a mentor and father figure to Tongan boxer Tony Fulilangi who once fought George Foreman.

== Background ==
Fenn has been referred to as "The Godfather of Arizona Boxing". Fenn during his time had made a huge contribution to boxing in Arizona, promoting both amateur and professional boxing. In the 1950s, the boxers he managed were golden gloves winners. In the mid 1970s, while president of the Arizona Golden Gloves Association, Fenn encountered major problems for allowing female boxer Marion Bermudez to fight.

== Boxers ==
After Zora Folley was discharged from the army in the 1950s, he signed up with Fenn as manager for ten years. In the 1980s, Fenn was managing Tony Fulilangi. Fenn's guidance, helped the young Tongan boxer straighten himself out.
