= Tony Fulilangi =

Tongan boxer

Personal information
- Nickname: Tongan Torpedo
- Nationality: Tongan
- Born: Sonatane Fulilangi; March 25, 1960 (age 66) Tonga

Boxing career
- Stance: Orthodox

Boxing record
- Total fights: 42
- Wins: 36
- Win by KO: 33
- Losses: 4
- Draws: 2

Tony Fulilangi (born March 25, 1960) is a former heavyweight boxer from Tonga. He has fought Bert Cooper, and Jimmy Young. He also once fought George Foreman. He is also a boxing coach and has coached Paea Wolfgramm.

== Background ==
Fulilangi was born Sonatane Fulilangi in Tonga.

Prior to his career Fulilangi attended Brigham Young University in Hawaii where he had been offered a track and field scholarship. He dropped out and didn't do much of anything for a couple of years until he decided to go to Phoenix to visit his brother. He went to a boxing gym there and punched the coach. After that he went to Al Fenn's gym and had a bit of similar trouble there when sparring with a former Golden Glove champion. His first amateur fights were all won by knockout before the second round had finished. Fulilangi's change from an amateur boxer to pro came about when he went to Hawaii to visit his sister. He had a fight in a Honolulu gym with the best heavyweight in Hawaii. He beat him and was offered a pro fight. On his first fight he beat his opponent by knocking him out in the first round. The following six pro fight saw Fulilangi knocking his opponent out before the second round was up. Fenn would play a part in straightening out the young Fulilangi somewhat.

== Career ==
By the age of 24, Fulilangi was based in Arizona and managed by Al Fenn.

=== 1981 to 1984 ===
In 1981, Fulilangi had eight fights and won all of them. On June 17, he fought Marcellus Pake Dudoit in Honolulu and knocked him out in the first round. On August 3, he fought Memo Soto and knocked him out in the third. The next two fights he had were against Tim Lampkin and Brady Wills. He won both of them by TKO. He beat Charles Smith in the first round in a fight that took place in Phoenix on October 13. He fought Tim Lampkin again in Phoenix on November 17. he knocked him out in the first round. The last two fights he had that year were against Larry Ware and J D Hall. Fulilangi won both of the fights by knockout.

In 1983, Fulilangi was set to fight Jimmy Young on July 31 at the Phoenix Civic Plaza. The fight was rescheduled. Fulilangi at the time had a record of 22-0-1 with 21 knockouts. His last fight had been with state heavyweight champion Tony Perea on May 16, and the fight was a draw. Young had health issues and Vince Giorno, the manager for Young asked for the fight to be postponed. Because he had previously asked for a postponement, National Sports Concepts promoter Tom Donato decided to cancel the fight. On September 22 that year, Fulilangi suffered his first loss as a professional when Monte Masters beat him in the tenth round. The fight was stopped by referee Lew Eskin after Masters had Fulilangi pinned against the ropes and was landing punches for nearly a minute. Fulilangi was referred to by The Los Angeles Times as the Mike Tyson of Masters's day.

=== 1985 to 1988 ===
On November 1, 1985, Fulilangi went up against Jimmy Young at the Veterans Memorial Coliseum in Phoenix. The fight lasted ten rounds and Fulilangi won by narrow decision.

In late 1986, having had 41 fights with 39 of them wins, he fought and won against Dean Waters in Sydney, Australia, and picked up the South Pacific heavyweight title.

He fought George Foreman in 1988 and Foreman beat him by TKO in the second round. Fulilangi said that he took a dive in the fight. This was his own decision. After being floored by Foreman twice, he was jabbed at by Foreman and then went under his swinging right hand and sat down. Foreman commented on what Fulilangi had said and mentioned fighters getting a whipping and deciding if they want to continue. After his fight with Foreman, Fulilangi retired.

== Coaching ==
In 1996, he was Paea Wolframm's coach. In 2011, he was the coach for Viliami Latu who at the time was rated #17 in the AIBA top 20.
