= Evander Holyfield vs. Rickey Parkey =

Boxing match

- Date: May 15, 1987
- Venue: Caesars Palace, Paradise, Nevada, U.S.
- Title(s) on the line: WBA and IBF cruiserweight titles

Tale of the tape
Boxer	Evander Holyfield	Rickey Parkey
Nickname	The Real Deal	
Hometown	Atlanta, Georgia, U.S.	Morristown, Tennessee, U.S.
Pre-fight record	14–0 (10 KO)	20–4 (14 KO)
Age	24 years, 6 months	30 years, 6 months
Height	6 ft 1 in (185 cm)	6 ft 2 in (188 cm)
Weight	188 lb (85 kg)	187 1/2 lb (85 kg)
Style	Orthodox	Orthodox
Recognition	WBA; Cruiserweight champion	IBF; Cruiserweight champion

Result
- Holyfield defeated Parkey via 3rd round TKO

Evander Holyfield vs. Rickey Parkey was a professional boxing match contested on May 15, 1987 for the WBA and IBF cruiserweight title.

== Background ==
After defeating his friend and former Olympic teammate Henry Tillman in his first successful title defense of his WBA cruiserweight title, Evander Holyfield next agreed to a unification bout with IBF cruiserweight champion Rickey Parkey. At first, only the IBF agreed to sanction the fight, while the WBA was initially reluctant. The Nevada Athletic Commission had withdrawn its membership from the WBA due to a dispute over two judges the WBA had chosen to score the Holyfield–Tillman fight and also because the WBA continued to recognize fighters from South Africa, a country the commission did not recognize. As a result, the WBA not only threatened to withdraw its sanctioning of both the Holyfield–Parkey cruiserweight title fight and the Mike Tyson–Pinklon Thomas heavyweight title fight, but to strip any of its champions should they chose to fight in Nevada. On the day of the fight, the WBA announced it would not sanction the fight, but would not strip Holyfield of the title though the title would be declared vacant should Parkey win. The following day the WBA and Nevada Athletic Commission would end their dispute after the WBA agreed to correct the issues that the commission had, this led the WBA to retroactively sanction the Holyfield–Parkey bout.

== The fight ==
After sweeping all three of the judge's scorecards in rounds one and two, Holyfield would bring an end to the fight in the third. Midway through the round, Holyfield stunned Parkey with consecutive right hands and then swarmed in with a combination that dropped Parkey to the canvas. After taking a knee, Parkey rose to his feet and continued the fight but Holyfield quickly sent him down again. Parkey again beat the referee's count and was allowed to continue. Holyfield again went on the attack and landed a barrage of unanswered punches, with Parkey offering no offense, the referee called the fight just as Holyfield landed another right hand that sent Parkey down one last time. Holyfield was named the winner by technical knockout at 2:44 of the round.

== Aftermath ==
In the post-fight press conference, Holyfield was asked "how soon can you pick up 20 pounds and go after Mike Tyson?" To which he replied that he wanted to wait "to make sure I can be effective at 205-210 pounds. I think we're smart enough to know when." His trainer and manager Lou Duva followed up by saying "He's going to clean up the cruiserweights first, there's no telling how long that's going to be."

== Fight card ==
Confirmed bouts:

Weight Class	Weight		vs.		Method	Round	Time	Notes
Cruiserweight	190 lb	Evander Holyfield (c)	def.	Rickey Parkey (c)	TKO	3/15		^{Note 1}
Cruiserweight	190 lb	Ossie Ocasio	def.	Dwight Muhammad Qawi	SD	10/10
Cruiserweight	190 lb	Anthony Witherspoon	def.	Ricardo Spain	UD	8/8
Heavyweight	200+ lb	James Hoover	vs.	Hector Fernandez	D	8/8

^Note 1 For WBA and IBF Cruiserweight titles.

== Broadcasting ==
Country	Broadcaster
United States	Showtime

Preceded by vs. Henry Tillman	Evander Holyfield's bouts 15 May 1987	Succeeded by vs. Ossie Ocasio
Preceded by vs. Chisanda Mutti	Rickey Parkey's bouts 15 May 1987	Succeeded by vs. Johnny du Plooy
