= Piet Crous =

South African boxer (born 1955)

Personal information
- Nationality: South African
- Born: Petrus Arnoldus Crous; 2 July 1955 (age 71) Johannesburg, South Africa
- Weight: Cruiserweight

Boxing career
- Stance: Orthodox

Boxing record
- Total fights: 30
- Wins: 26
- Win by KO: 21
- Losses: 2
- Draws: 1
- No contests: 1

Petrus Arnoldus Crous (born 2 July 1955) is a South African former professional boxer who competed from 1977 to 1987.

== Professional career ==
Crous turned pro in 1977.

=== Cruiserweight champion ===
He won the WBA cruiserweight title with a unanimous decision win over Ossie Ocasio in 1984, though he was paid less than $10,000. He defended the belt once, on 30 March 1985, at the Sun City Super Bowl in Sun City, South Africa, against American challenger Randy Stephens, recuperating from a third-round knockdown to knock Stephens out in that same third round. Crous became the first South African to retain a world boxing title in 35 years. He lost the title to Dwight Muhammad Qawi via TKO the following year; he was knocked down twice in the 11th round.

He retired in 1987.

== Professional boxing record ==
30 fights	26 wins	2 losses
By knockout	21	2
By decision	4	0
By disqualification	1	0
Draws	1	
No contests	1	

Preceded by Ossie Ocasio	WBA Cruiserweight Champion; 1 Dec 1984–27 Jul 1985	Succeeded by Dwight Muhammad Qawi
