= Roy Jones Jr. vs. Vinny Pazienza =

Boxing competition

The Devil and Mr. Jones
- Date: June 24, 1995
- Venue: Convention Hall, Atlantic City, New Jersey, U.S.
- Title(s) on the line: IBF super middleweight title

Tale of the tape
Boxer	Roy Jones Jr.	Vinny Pazienza
Nickname	"Junior"	"The Pazmanian Devil"
Hometown	Pensacola, Florida, U.S.	Cranston, Rhode Island, U.S.
Purse	$2,000,000	$1,350,000
Pre-fight record	28–0 (24 KO)	40–5 (27 KO)
Age	26 years, 5 months	32 years, 6 months
Height	5 ft 11 in (180 cm)	5 ft 7 in (170 cm)
Weight	168 lb (76 kg)	168 lb (76 kg)
Style	Orthodox	Orthodox
Recognition	IBF; Super Middleweight Champion; The Ring; No. 1 Ranked Super Middleweight; The Ring No. 2 ranked pound-for-pound fighter 2-division world champion	WBA; No. 4 Ranked Super Middleweight; The Ring; No. 6 Ranked Super Middleweight; 2-division world champion

Result
- Jones Jr. wins via 6th–round TKO

Roy Jones Jr. vs. Vinny Pazienza, billed as The Devil and Mr. Jones was a professional boxing match contested on June 24, 1995 for the IBF super middleweight championship.

== Background ==
After defeating James Toney to capture the IBF super middleweight title, Roy Jones would successfully defend the title against Antoine Byrd before being matched up against former WBA light middleweight champion Vinny Pazienza. Pazienza had won that title on October 1, 1991 but just over a month later on November 12, he was involved in a near-fatal car crash that fractured his neck and nearly cost him his boxing career. Though doctors had informed him that his boxing career was over, Pazienza returned to boxing after a 13-month layoff to defeat future WBC light middleweight champion Luis Santana by unanimous decision. Pazienza would then move up two divisions to super middleweight and won nine consecutive fights (including two against future hall-of-famer Roberto Durán) before landing the fight with Jones. Jones was regarded as one of the best fighters in the sport and was ranked at number two on The Ring pound-for-pound list (Pernell Whitaker was number one). As a result, Pazienza was installed as a massive underdog with Jones being listed as a 12–1 favorite, though one Las Vegas oddsmaker listed the odds at 100–1 in Jones' favor. Pazienza shrugged off his underdog status, however, stating "It makes me all the more determined to prove him wrong. And, besides, I'm most dangerous when I'm an underdog"

== The Fight ==
Pazienza proved to be no match for Jones, who would dominate the duration of the fight. Pazienza tried to be aggressive in the early parts of the fight, but Jones would use his superior skills to thwart Pazienza's offense and by the third round, Jones had opened a cut above Pazienza's right eye. In the fourth round, Jones would become the first fighter in the history of compubox to go an entire round without being hit by an opponent as Pazienza was unable to connect with any of the five punches he threw in that round. Jones would also bust Pazienza's nose open in that round as well. With less than a minute to go in round six, Jones would score a knockdown over Pazienza after a left hook followed by a combination sent Pazienza to the canvas. Though Pazienza was clearly shaken from the exchange, he was allowed to continue, but Jones quickly put him down again with a right hand with 25 seconds left in the round. The referee again let Pazienza continue, prompting Jones to almost immediately land a six-punch combination that sent Pazienza crashing to the canvas for the third time in the round. The referee then called the fight with two seconds left in the round, giving Jones the victory by technical knockout.

== Aftermath ==
After the bout Jones would say "He was a tougher competitor than I thought he was".

== Undercard ==
Confirmed bouts:

Winner	Loser	Weight division/title belt(s) disputed	Result
(United States) Al Cole	(Jamaica) Uriah Grant	IBF World Cruiserweight title	Unanimous decision
(United States) Derrick Gainer	(United States) Harold Warren	NABF Featherweight title	Unanimous decision
(United States) Larry Barnes	(United States) Jeff Passero	Welterweight (10 rounds)	5th round KO
Preliminary bouts
(Russia) Sergey Kobozev	(United States) Art Bayliss	Cruiserweight (10 rounds)	6th round TKO
(United States) Ezra Sellers	(Barbados) Richie Brown	Cruiserweight (6 rounds)	4th round TKO
(United States) Luis Rosado	(United States) Eddie Colon	Welterweight (6 rounds)	3rd round TKO
(United States) Jerry Daughtery	(United States) Carlos Fermainti	Lightweight (4 rounds)	3rd round TKO

== Broadcasting ==
Country	Broadcaster
United States	HBO

Preceded by vs. Antoine Byrd	Roy Jones Jr.'s bouts 24 June 1995	Succeeded by vs. Tony Thornton
Preceded by vs. Roberto Durán II	Vinny Pazienza's bouts 24 June 1995	Succeeded by vs. Dana Rosenblatt
