= List of boxing quadruple champions =

A quadruple champion in boxing refers to a boxer who has won world titles in four different categories of weight.

== Recognition ==
=== Major sanctioning bodies ===
There is some dispute on which sanctioning body is considered "major" enough to award championships. The "Big 4" sanctioning bodies are always included. They are arranged in order of foundation:

- World Boxing Association (WBA) — founded in 1921
- World Boxing Council (WBC) — founded in 1963
- International Boxing Federation (IBF) — founded in 1983
- World Boxing Organization (WBO) — founded in 1988

==== The Ring ====
The Ring, a well known boxing magazine, has awarded world championships in professional boxing within each weight class from its foundation in 1922 until the 1990s, and again since 2001. The Ring champions were at one point held the linear reign to the throne, the man who beat the man. The lineal champion is also known as the true champion of the division. The Ring stopped giving belts to world champions in the 1990s but began again in 2002.

In 2002, The Ring attempted to clear up the confusion regarding world champions by creating a championship policy. It echoed many critics' arguments that the sanctioning bodies in charge of boxing championships had undermined the sport by pitting undeserving contenders against undeserving "champions", and forcing the boxing public to see mismatches for so-called "world championships". The Ring attempted to clear up the confusion regarding world champions by creating a championship policy that is "intended to reward fighters who, by satisfying rigid criteria, can justify a claim as the true and only world champion in a given weight class." The Ring claims to be more authoritative and open than the sanctioning bodies' rankings, with a page devoted to full explanations for ranking changes. A fighter pays no sanctioning fees to defend or fight for the title at stake, contrary to practices of the sanctioning bodies. Furthermore, a fighter cannot be stripped of the title unless he loses, decides to move to a different weight division, or retires.

There are currently only two ways that a boxer can win The Ring's title: defeat the reigning champion; or win a box-off between the magazine's number-one and number-two rated contenders (or, sometimes, number-one and number-three rated). A vacant Ring championship is filled when the number-one contender in a weight-division battles the number-two contender or the number-three contender (in cases where The Ring determines that the number-two and number-three contenders are close in abilities and records).

In May 2012, citing the number of vacancies in various weight classes as primary motivation, The Ring unveiled a new championship policy. Under the new policy, The Ring title can be awarded when the No. 1 and No. 2 fighters face one another or when the Nos. 1 and 2 contenders choose not to fight one another and either of them fights No. 3, No. 4 or No. 5, the winner may be awarded The Ring belt. In addition, there are now six ways for a fighter to lose his title: lose a fight in his championship weight class; move to another weight class; not schedule a fight in any weight class for 18 months; not schedule a fight in his championship weight class for 18 months, even if fighting at another weight class; not scheduling a fight with a top 5 contender in any weight class for two years; or retiring.

Many media outlets and members are extremely critical of the new championship policy and state that if this new policy is followed The Ring title will lose the credibility it once held.

==== Lineal ====
The Transnational Boxing Rankings Board (TBRB) hands out the official version of the lineal championship. TBRB awards vacant championships when the two top-ranked fighters in any division meet and currently recognizes legitimate world champions or "true champions" each weight classes. The Board was formed to continue where The Ring "left off" in the aftermath of its purchase by Golden Boy Promotions in 2007 and the following dismissal of Nigel Collins. After the new editors announced a controversial new championship policy in May 2012, three prominent members of the Ring Advisory Panel resigned. This three members (Springs Toledo, Cliff Rold and Tim Starks) became the founding members of the Transnational Boxing Rankings Board, which was formed over the summer of 2012 with the assistance of Stewart Howe of England.

Since 2012, lineal champions are predetermined by the Transnational Boxing Rankings Board, which promotes the concept of a singular world champion per weight class. Lineal champions are listed on Cyber Boxing Zone website which list lineal champions of the Queensberry Era to date.

=== Minor sanctioning bodies ===
They are: International Boxing Organization (IBO), World Professional Boxing Federation (WPBF), International Boxing Association (IBA), International Boxing Council (IBC), International Boxing Board (IBB), International Boxing League (IBL), International Boxing Union (IBU), Global Boxing Association (GBA), Global Boxing Council (GBC), Global Boxing Federation GBF, Global Boxing Organization (GBO), Global Boxing Union (GBU), National Boxing Association (NBA), Transcontinental World Boxing Association (TWBA), Universal Boxing Association (UBA), Universal Boxing Council (UBC), Universal Boxing Federation (UBF), Universal Boxing Organization (UBO), UNIBOX, United States Boxing Council (USBC), World Athletic Association (WAA), World Boxing Board (WBB), World Boxing Championship Committee (WBCC), World Boxing Foundation (WBFo), World Boxing Institute (WBI), World Boxing League (WBL), World Boxing Network (WBN), World Boxing Union (WBU).

Note:

- The International Boxing Association (IBA) is not to be confused with the International Boxing Association (AIBA), a French acronym for Association Internationale de Boxe Amateur, which sanctions amateur matches.
- The National Boxing Association (NBA) was established in 1984 and is not to be confused with the original National Boxing Association that was established in 1921 and changed its name to World Boxing Association (WBA) in 1962.

== List of men's quadruple champions ==
This list is credited for boxers who have won championships in boxing from major sanctioning bodies (WBA, WBC, IBF, WBO), The Ring.

WBA has four recognized world champions, Super, Undisputed, Unified, and Regular. The highest tier title is considered the primary champion of the division. Only boxers who are in the primary champion lineage are listed.

The ranking of WBA's primary champions are as follows:

- Super/Undisputed
- Unified
- Regular

	Inducted into the International Boxing Hall of Fame
	World Titles from The Ring
‡	**WBA** Regular Champion as primary title because **WBA** Super, Undisputed, and Unified is vacant/vacated during his title reign.

No.	Name	Titles	Date	Opponent	Result
1	Thomas Hearns	**WBA** Welterweight	Aug 2, 1980	Pipino Cuevas	TKO 2/15
1	Thomas Hearns	**WBC** Light middleweight	Dec 3, 1982	Wilfred Benítez	MD 15/15
1	Thomas Hearns	**The Ring** Light middleweight	Dec 3, 1982	Wilfred Benítez	MD 15/15
1	Thomas Hearns	**WBC** Light heavyweight	Mar 7, 1987	Dennis Andries	TKO 10/12
1	Thomas Hearns	**WBC** Middleweight	**Oct 29, 1987**	Juan Domingo Roldán	KO 4/12
1	Thomas Hearns	**WBA** Light heavyweight	Mar 6, 1991	Virgil Hill	UD 12/12
2	Sugar Ray Leonard	**WBC** Welterweight	Nov 30, 1979	Wilfred Benítez	TKO 15/15
2	Sugar Ray Leonard	**The Ring** Welterweight	Nov 30, 1979	Wilfred Benítez	TKO 15/15
2	Sugar Ray Leonard	**WBC** Welterweight – (**2**)	Nov 25, 1980	Roberto Durán	TKO 8/15
2	Sugar Ray Leonard	**The Ring** Welterweight – (**2**)	Nov 25, 1980	Roberto Durán	TKO 8/15
2	Sugar Ray Leonard	**WBA** Light middleweight	Jun 25, 1981	Ayub Kalule	TKO 9/15
2	Sugar Ray Leonard	**The Ring** Light middleweight	Jun 25, 1981	Ayub Kalule	TKO 9/15
2	Sugar Ray Leonard	**WBA** Welterweight	Sep 16, 1981	Thomas Hearns	TKO 14/15
2	Sugar Ray Leonard	**WBC** Middleweight	Apr 6, 1987	Marvin Hagler	SD 12/12
2	Sugar Ray Leonard	**The Ring** Middleweight	Apr 6, 1987	Marvin Hagler	SD 12/12
2	Sugar Ray Leonard	**WBC** Super middleweight	**Nov 7, 1988**	Don Lalonde	TKO 9/12
3	Roberto Durán	**WBA** Lightweight	Jun 26, 1972	Ken Buchanan	TKO 13/15
3	Roberto Durán	**The Ring** Lightweight	Jun 26, 1972	Ken Buchanan	TKO 13/15
3	Roberto Durán	**WBC** Lightweight	Jan 21, 1978	Esteban de Jesús	TKO 12/15
3	Roberto Durán	**WBC** Welterweight	Jun 20, 1980	Sugar Ray Leonard	UD 15/15
3	Roberto Durán	**The Ring** Welterweight	Jun 20, 1980	Sugar Ray Leonard	UD 15/15
3	Roberto Durán	**WBA** Light middleweight	Jun 16, 1983	Davey Moore	TKO 8/15
3	Roberto Durán	**WBC** Middleweight	**Feb 24, 1989**	Iran Barkley	SD 12/12
4	Pernell Whitaker	**IBF** Lightweight	Feb 18, 1989	Greg Haugen	UD 12/12
4	Pernell Whitaker	**WBC** Lightweight	Aug 20, 1989	José Luis Ramírez	UD 12/12
4	Pernell Whitaker	**The Ring** Lightweight	Aug 20, 1989	José Luis Ramírez	UD 12/12
4	Pernell Whitaker	**WBA** Lightweight	Aug 11, 1990	Juan Nazario	KO 1/12
4	Pernell Whitaker	**IBF** Light welterweight	Jul 18, 1992	Rafael Pineda	UD 12/12
4	Pernell Whitaker	**WBC** Welterweight	Mar 6, 1993	James McGirt	UD 12/12
4	Pernell Whitaker	**WBA** Light middleweight	**Mar 4, 1995**	Julio César Vásquez	UD 12/12
5	Oscar De La Hoya	**WBO** Super featherweight	Mar 5, 1994	Jimmy Bredahl	TKO 10/12
5	Oscar De La Hoya	**WBO** Lightweight	Feb 18, 1995	John-John Molina	UD 12/12
5	Oscar De La Hoya	**IBF** Lightweight	May 6, 1995	Rafael Ruelas	TKO 2/12
5	Oscar De La Hoya	**WBC** Light welterweight	Jun 7, 1996	Julio César Chávez	TKO 4/12
5	Oscar De La Hoya	**WBC** Welterweight	**Apr 12, 1997**	Pernell Whitaker	UD 12/12
5	Oscar De La Hoya	**WBC** Welterweight – (**2**)	Mar 21, 2000	**No. 1 contender promoted**	
6	Leo Gámez	**WBA** Mini flyweight	Jan 10, 1988	Kim Bong Jun	UD 12/12
6	Leo Gámez	**WBA** Light flyweight	Oct 21, 1993	Shiro Yahiro	TKO 9/12
6	Leo Gámez	**WBA** Flyweight	Mar 13, 1999	Hugo Rafael Soto	KO 3/12
6	Leo Gámez	**WBA** Super flyweight	**Oct 9, 2000**	Hideki Todaka	KO 7/12
7	Roy Jones Jr.	**IBF** Middleweight	May 22, 1993	Bernard Hopkins	UD 12/12
7	Roy Jones Jr.	**IBF** Super middleweight	Oct 21, 1993	James Toney	UD 12/12
7	Roy Jones Jr.	**WBC** Light heavyweight	Jan 13, 1997	**Interim promoted**	
7	Roy Jones Jr.	**WBC** Light heavyweight – (**2**)	Aug 7, 1997	Montell Griffin	KO 1/12
7	Roy Jones Jr.	**WBC** Light heavyweight – (**3**)	Jun 1998	**Reinstated**	
7	Roy Jones Jr.	**WBA** Light heavyweight, later promoted to inaugural Super champion; Status changed to Unified champion on WBA's official rankings.	Jul 18, 1998	Lou Del Valle	UD 12/12
7	Roy Jones Jr.	**WBA** Light heavyweight, later promoted to inaugural Super champion; Status changed to Unified champion on WBA's official rankings.	Super; Dec 2000	Lou Del Valle	UD 12/12
7	Roy Jones Jr.	**WBA** Light heavyweight, later promoted to inaugural Super champion; Status changed to Unified champion on WBA's official rankings.	Unified; Aug 5, 2002	Lou Del Valle	UD 12/12
7	Roy Jones Jr.	**IBF** Light heavyweight	Jun 5, 1999	Reggie Johnson	UD 12/12
7	Roy Jones Jr.	**The Ring** Light heavyweight	Dec 2, 2001	**Awarded**}	
7	Roy Jones Jr.	**WBA** Heavyweight	**Mar 1, 2003**	John Ruiz	UD 12/12
7	Roy Jones Jr.	**WBA** (Unified) Light heavyweight – (**2**)	Nov 8, 2003	Antonio Tarver	UD 12/12
7	Roy Jones Jr.	**WBC** Light heavyweight – (**4**)	Nov 8, 2003	Antonio Tarver	UD 12/12
8	Floyd Mayweather Jr.	**WBC** Super featherweight	Oct 3, 1998	Genaro Hernandez	RTD 8/12
8	Floyd Mayweather Jr.	**WBC** Lightweight	Apr 20, 2002	José Luis Castillo	UD 12/12
8	Floyd Mayweather Jr.	**The Ring** Lightweight	Apr 20, 2002	José Luis Castillo	UD 12/12
8	Floyd Mayweather Jr.	**WBC** Light welterweight	Jun 25, 2005	Arturo Gatti	TKO 6/12
8	Floyd Mayweather Jr.	**IBF** Welterweight	**Apr 8, 2006**	Zab Judah	UD 12/12
8	Floyd Mayweather Jr.	**WBC** Welterweight	Nov 4, 2006	Carlos Baldomir	UD 12/12
8	Floyd Mayweather Jr.	**The Ring** Welterweight	Nov 4, 2006	Carlos Baldomir	UD 12/12
8	Floyd Mayweather Jr.	**WBC** Welterweight – (**2**)	Dec 17, 2011	Victor Ortiz	KO 4/12
8	Floyd Mayweather Jr.	**The Ring** Welterweight – (**2**)	May 4, 2013	Robert Guerrero	UD 12/12
8	Floyd Mayweather Jr.	**WBA** (Unified) Welterweight	May 3, 2014	Marcos Maidana	MD 12/12
8	Floyd Mayweather Jr.	**WBO** Welterweight	May 2, 2015	Manny Pacquiao	UD 12/12
9	Manny Pacquiao	**WBC** Flyweight	Dec 4, 1998	Chatchai Sasakul	KO 8/12
9	Manny Pacquiao	**IBF** Super bantamweight	Jun 23, 2001	Lehlohonolo Ledwaba	KO 6/12
9	Manny Pacquiao	**The Ring** Featherweight	Nov 15, 2003	Marco Antonio Barrera	TKO 11/12
9	Manny Pacquiao	**WBC** Super featherweight	**Mar 15, 2008**	Juan Manuel Márquez	SD 12/12
9	Manny Pacquiao	**The Ring** Super featherweight	**Mar 15, 2008**	Juan Manuel Márquez	SD 12/12
10	Érik Morales	**WBC** Super bantamweight	Sep 6, 1997	Daniel Zaragoza	KO 11/12
10	Érik Morales	**WBO** Super bantamweight	Feb 19, 2000	Marco Antonio Barrera	SD 12/12
10	Érik Morales	**WBC** Featherweight	Feb 17, 2001	Guty Espadas Jr.	UD 12/12
10	Érik Morales	**WBC** Featherweight – (**2**)	Nov 16, 2002	Paulie Ayala	UD 12/12
10	Érik Morales	**WBC** Super featherweight	Feb 28, 2004	Jesus Chavez	UD 12/12
10	Érik Morales	**IBF** Super featherweight	Jul 31, 2004	Carlos Hernández	UD 12/12
10	Érik Morales	**WBC** Light welterweight	**Sep 17, 2011**	Pablo Cesar Cano	TKO 10/12
11	Jorge Arce	**WBO** Light flyweight	Dec 5, 1998	Juan Domingo Cordoba	UD 12/12
11	Jorge Arce	**WBC** Light flyweight	Jul 6, 2002	Choi Yo-sam	TKO 6/12
11	Jorge Arce	**WBO** Super flyweight	Jan 30, 2010	Angky Angkotta	TD 7/12
11	Jorge Arce	**WBO** Super bantamweight	May 7, 2011	Wilfredo Vazquez, Jr.	TKO 12/12
11	Jorge Arce	**WBO** Bantamweight	**Nov 26, 2011**	Angky Angkotta	UD 12/12
12	Juan Manuel Márquez	**IBF** Featherweight	Feb 1, 2003	Manuel Medina	TKO 7/12
12	Juan Manuel Márquez	**WBA** (Unified) Featherweight	Nov 1, 2003	Derrick Gainer	TD 7/12
12	Juan Manuel Márquez	**WBO** Featherweight	Dec 6, 2006	**Interim promoted**	
12	Juan Manuel Márquez	**WBC** Super featherweight	Mar 17, 2007	Marco Antonio Barrera	UD 12/12
12	Juan Manuel Márquez	**The Ring** Lightweight	Sep 13, 2008	Joel Casamayor	TKO 11/12
12	Juan Manuel Márquez	**WBA** (Super) Lightweight	Feb 28, 2009	Juan Díaz	TKO 9/12
12	Juan Manuel Márquez	**WBO** Lightweight	Feb 28, 2009	Juan Díaz	TKO 9/12
12	Juan Manuel Márquez	**WBO** Light welterweight	**Jun 28, 2012**	**Interim promoted**	
13	Nonito Donaire	**IBF** Flyweight	Jul 7, 2007	Vic Darchinyan	TKO 5/12
13	Nonito Donaire	**WBC** Bantamweight	Feb 19, 2011	Fernando Montiel	KO 2/12
13	Nonito Donaire	**WBO** Bantamweight	Feb 19, 2011	Fernando Montiel	KO 2/12
13	Nonito Donaire	**WBO** Super bantamweight	Feb 4, 2012	Wilfredo Vázquez, Jr.	SD 12/12
13	Nonito Donaire	**IBF** Super bantamweight	Jul 7, 2012	Jeffrey Mathebula	UD 12/12
13	Nonito Donaire	**The Ring** Super bantamweight	Oct 13, 2012	Toshiaki Nishioka	TKO 9/12
13	Nonito Donaire	**WBA** (Undisputed) Featherweight	**May 31, 2014**	Simpiwe Vetyeka	TD 5/12
13	Nonito Donaire	**WBO** Super bantamweight – (**2**)	Dec 11, 2015	Cesar Juarez	UD 12/12
13	Nonito Donaire	**WBA** (Super) Bantamweight	Nov 3, 2018	Ryan Burnett	RTD 4/12
13	Nonito Donaire	**WBC** Bantamweight – (**2**)	May 29, 2021	Nordine Oubaali	KO 4/12
14	Miguel Cotto	**WBO** Light welterweight	Sep 11, 2004	Kelson Pinto	TKO 6/12
14	Miguel Cotto	**WBA** Welterweight	Dec 2, 2006	Carlos Quintana	RTD 5/12
14	Miguel Cotto	**WBO** Welterweight	Feb 21, 2009	Michael Jennings	TKO 5/12
14	Miguel Cotto	**WBA** Light middleweight	Jun 5, 2010	Yuri Foreman	TKO 9/12
14	Miguel Cotto	**WBA** Light middleweight	Super; Oct 15, 2010	**Regular**^{‡} **promoted**	
14	Miguel Cotto	**WBC** Middleweight	**Jun 7, 2014**	Sergio Martinez	RTD 9/12
14	Miguel Cotto	**The Ring** Middleweight	**Jun 7, 2014**	Sergio Martinez	RTD 9/12
14	Miguel Cotto	**WBO** Light middleweight	Aug 26, 2017	Yoshihiro Kamegai	UD 12/12
15	Adrien Broner	**WBO** Super featherweight	Nov 26, 2011	Vicente Martín Rodríguez	KO 3/12
15	Adrien Broner	**WBC** Lightweight	Nov 17, 2012	Antonio DeMarco	TKO 8/12
15	Adrien Broner	**WBA** Welterweight	Jun 22, 2013	Paulie Malignaggi	SD 12/12
15	Adrien Broner	**WBA** Light welterweight	**Oct 3, 2015**	Khabib Allakhverdiev	TKO 12/12
15	Adrien Broner	**WBA** Light welterweight	Super; Nov 5, 2015	**Regular**^{‡} **promoted**	
16	Román González	**WBA** Mini flyweight	Sep 15, 2008	Yutaka Niida	TKO 4/12
16	Román González	**WBA** Light flyweight	Regular^{‡} Feb 5, 2011	**Interim promoted**	
16	Román González	**WBA** Light flyweight	Super; Nov 30, 2012	**Regular**^{‡} **promoted**	
16	Román González	**WBC** Flyweight	Sep 5, 2014	Akira Yaegashi	TKO 9/12
16	Román González	**The Ring** Flyweight	Sep 5, 2014	Akira Yaegashi	TKO 9/12
16	Román González	**WBC** Super flyweight	**Sep 11, 2016**	Carlos Cuadras	UD 12/12
16	Román González	**WBA** (Super) Super flyweight	Feb 29, 2020	Kal Yafai	TKO 9/12
17	Mikey Garcia	**WBO** Featherweight	Jan 19, 2013	Orlando Salido	TD 9/12
17	Mikey Garcia	**The Ring** Featherweight	Jan 19, 2013	Orlando Salido	TD 9/12
17	Mikey Garcia	**WBO** Super featherweight	Nov 9, 2013	Román Martínez	KO 8/12
17	Mikey Garcia	**WBC** Lightweight	Jan 28, 2017	Dejan Zlatičanin	KO 3/12
17	Mikey Garcia	**IBF** Light welterweight	**Mar 20, 2018**	Sergey Lipinets	UD 12/12
17	Mikey Garcia	**IBF** Lightweight	Jul 28, 2018	Robert Easter Jr.	UD 12/12
18	Donnie Nietes	**WBO** Mini flyweight	Sep 7, 2007	Pornsawan Porpramook	UD 12/12
18	Donnie Nietes	**WBO** Light flyweight	Oct 8, 2011	Ramón García Hirales	UD 12/12
18	Donnie Nietes	**The Ring** Light flyweight	May 10, 2014	Moisés Fuentes	TKO 9/12
18	Donnie Nietes	**IBF** Flyweight	Apr 29, 2017	Komgrich Nantapech	UD 12/12
18	Donnie Nietes	**WBO** Super flyweight	**Dec 31, 2018**	Kazuto Ioka	SD 12/12
19	Kazuto Ioka	**WBC** Mini flyweight	Feb 11, 2011	Oleydong Sithsamerchai	TKO 5/12
19	Kazuto Ioka	**WBA** Mini flyweight	Jun 20, 2012	Akira Yaegashi	UD 12/12
19	Kazuto Ioka	**WBA** (Regular^{‡}) Light flyweight	Jan 14, 2014	**Primary champion vacant**	
19	Kazuto Ioka	**WBA** (Regular^{‡}) Flyweight	Sep 14, 2016	**Primary champion vacant**	
19	Kazuto Ioka	**WBO** Super flyweight	**Jun 19, 2019**	Aston Palicte	TKO 10/12
19	Kazuto Ioka	**WBA** Super flyweight	Jun 24, 2023	Joshua Franco	UD 12/12
20	Léo Santa Cruz	**IBF** Bantamweight	Jun 2, 2012	Vusi Malinga	UD 12/12
20	Léo Santa Cruz	**WBC** Super bantamweight	Aug 24, 2014	Victor Terrazas	TKO 3/12
20	Léo Santa Cruz	**WBA** (Super) Featherweight	Aug 29, 2015	Abner Mares	MD 12/12
20	Léo Santa Cruz	**WBA** (Super) Featherweight – (**2**)	Jul 30, 2016	Carl Frampton	MD 12/12
20	Léo Santa Cruz	**WBA** (Super) Super featherweight	**Nov 23, 2019**	Miguel Flores	UD 12/12
21	Canelo Álvarez	**WBC** Light middleweight	Mar 5, 2011	Matthew Hatton	UD 12/12
21	Canelo Álvarez	**The Ring** Light middleweight	Apr 20, 2013	Austin Trout	UD 12/12
21	Canelo Álvarez	**WBC** Middleweight	Nov 21, 2015	Miguel Cotto	UD 12/12
21	Canelo Álvarez	**The Ring** Middleweight	Nov 21, 2015	Miguel Cotto	UD 12/12
21	Canelo Álvarez	**WBO** Light middleweight	Sep 17, 2016	Liam Smith	KO 9/12
21	Canelo Álvarez	**WBA** (Super) Middleweight	Sep 15, 2018	Gennady Golovkin	MD 12/12
21	Canelo Álvarez	**WBC** Middleweight – (**2**)	Sep 15, 2018	Gennady Golovkin	MD 12/12
21	Canelo Álvarez	**The Ring** Middleweight – (**2**)	Sep 15, 2018	Gennady Golovkin	MD 12/12
21	Canelo Álvarez	**IBF** Middleweight	May 4, 2019	Daniel Jacobs	UD 12/12
21	Canelo Álvarez	**WBO** Light heavyweight	Nov 2, 2019	Sergey Kovalev	KO 11/12
21	Canelo Álvarez	**WBA** (Super) Super middleweight	**Dec 19, 2020**	Callum Smith	UD 12/12
21	Canelo Álvarez	**WBC** Super middleweight	**Dec 19, 2020**	Callum Smith	UD 12/12
21	Canelo Álvarez	**The Ring** Super middleweight	**Dec 19, 2020**	Callum Smith	UD 12/12
21	Canelo Álvarez	**WBO** Super middleweight	May 8, 2021	Billy Joe Saunders	RTD 8/12
21	Canelo Álvarez	**IBF** Super middleweight	Nov 6, 2021	Caleb Plant	TKO 11/12
21	Canelo Álvarez	**IBF** Super middleweight – (**2**)	May 3, 2025	William Scull	UD 12/12
22	Naoya Inoue	**WBC** Light flyweight	Apr 6, 2014	Adrián Hernández	KO 6/12
22	Naoya Inoue	**WBO** Super flyweight	Dec 30, 2014	Omar Narváez	KO 2/12
22	Naoya Inoue	**IBF** Bantamweight	May 18, 2019	Emmanuel Rodríguez	KO 2/12
22	Naoya Inoue	**The Ring** Bantamweight	May 18, 2019	Emmanuel Rodríguez	KO 2/12
22	Naoya Inoue	**WBA** (Super) Bantamweight	Nov 7, 2019	Nonito Donaire	UD 12/12
22	Naoya Inoue	**WBC** Bantamweight	Jun 7, 2022	Nonito Donaire	TKO 2/12
22	Naoya Inoue	**WBO** Bantamweight	Dec 13, 2022	Paul Butler	KO 11/12
22	Naoya Inoue	**WBC** Super bantamweight	**Jul 25, 2023**	Stephen Fulton	TKO 8/12
22	Naoya Inoue	**WBO** Super bantamweight	**Jul 25, 2023**	Stephen Fulton	TKO 8/12
22	Naoya Inoue	**WBA** (Super) Super bantamweight	Dec 26, 2023	Marlon Tapales	KO 10/12
22	Naoya Inoue	**IBF** Super bantamweight	Dec 26, 2023	Marlon Tapales	KO 10/12
22	Naoya Inoue	**The Ring** Super bantamweight	Dec 26, 2023	Marlon Tapales	KO 10/12
23	Kosei Tanaka	**WBO** Mini flyweight	May 30, 2015	Julian Yedras	UD 12/12
23	Kosei Tanaka	**WBO** Light flyweight	Dec 31, 2016	Moisés Fuentes	TKO 5/12
23	Kosei Tanaka	**WBO** Flyweight	Sep 24, 2018	Sho Kimura	MD 12/12
23	Kosei Tanaka	**WBO** Super flyweight	**Feb 24, 2024**	Christian Bacasegua	UD 12/12
24	Terence Crawford	**WBO** Lightweight	Mar 1, 2014	Ricky Burns	UD 12/12
24	Terence Crawford	**The Ring** Lightweight	Nov 29, 2014	Ray Beltrán	UD 12/12
24	Terence Crawford	**WBO** Light welterweight	Apr 18, 2015	Thomas Dulorme	TKO 6/12
24	Terence Crawford	**WBC** Light welterweight	Jul 23, 2016	Viktor Postol	UD 12/12
24	Terence Crawford	**The Ring** Light welterweight	Jul 23, 2016	Viktor Postol	UD 12/12
24	Terence Crawford	**IBF** Light welterweight	Aug 19, 2017	Julius Indongo	KO 3/12
24	Terence Crawford	**WBA** (Super) Light welterweight	Aug 19, 2017	Julius Indongo	KO 3/12
24	Terence Crawford	**WBO** Welterweight	Jun 9, 2018	Jeff Horn	TKO 9/12
24	Terence Crawford	**WBA** (Super) Welterweight	Jul 29, 2023	Errol Spence Jr.	TKO 9/12
24	Terence Crawford	**WBC** Welterweight	Jul 29, 2023	Errol Spence Jr.	TKO 9/12
24	Terence Crawford	**IBF** Welterweight	Jul 29, 2023	Errol Spence Jr.	TKO 9/12
24	Terence Crawford	**The Ring** Welterweight	Jul 29, 2023	Errol Spence Jr.	TKO 9/12
24	Terence Crawford	**WBA** Light middleweight	**Aug 3, 2024**	Israil Madrimov	UD 12/12
25	Shakur Stevenson				
25	Shakur Stevenson	**WBO** Featherweight	Oct 26, 2019	Joet Gonzalez	UD 12/12
25	Shakur Stevenson	**WBO** Super featherweight	Oct 23, 2021	Jamel Herring	TKO 10/12
25	Shakur Stevenson	**WBC** Super featherweight	Apr 30, 2022	Óscar Valdez	UD 12/12
25	Shakur Stevenson	**The Ring** Super featherweight	Apr 30, 2022	Óscar Valdez	UD 12/12
25	Shakur Stevenson	**WBC** Lightweight	Nov 16, 2023	Edwin De Los Santos	UD 12/12
25	Shakur Stevenson	**WBO** Light welterweight	**Jan 31, 2026**	Teofimo Lopez	UD 12/12
25	Shakur Stevenson	**The Ring** Light welterweight	**Jan 31, 2026**	Teofimo Lopez	UD 12/12

=== Men's quadruple champions notes ===
- Dates in bold format signify the date when they won their 4th division title.
- Interim titles are not included unless it gets promoted to the official title.
- Any **WBA** titles won before the titles are fragmented in the division are not marked as Super, Undisputed, Unified, or Regular.
- In August 2021, the WBA has started recognizing a single champion per division as part of their title reduction plan. World titles won after the plan will not be marked as Regular.

== List of women's quadruple champion ==
The following is a list of women's quadruple champions who have held titles from one or more of the "Big Four" organizations (WBA, WBC, IBF, WBO) and The Ring.

World Titles from The Ring

No.	Name	Titles	Date	Opponent	Result
1	Alejandra Oliveras	**WBC** Super bantamweight	May 20, 2006	Jackie Nava	KO 8/10
1	Alejandra Oliveras	**WBA** Lightweight	Aug 12, 2011	Liliana Palmera	RTD 5/10
1	Alejandra Oliveras	**WBO** Featherweight	Jan 5, 2012	Jessica Villafranca	KO 5/10
1	Alejandra Oliveras	**WBC** Light welterweight	**Oct 11, 2013**	Lely Luz Florez	TKO 7/10
2	Amanda Serrano	**IBF** Super featherweight	Sep 10, 2011	Kimberly Connor	TKO 2/10
2	Amanda Serrano	**WBO** Lightweight	Aug 15, 2014	Maria Elena Maderna	KO 6/10
2	Amanda Serrano	**WBO** Featherweight	Feb 17, 2016	Olivia Gerula	TKO 1/10
2	Amanda Serrano	**WBO** Super bantamweight	**Oct 18, 2016**	Alexandra Lázár	TKO 5/10
2	Amanda Serrano	**WBO** Featherweight – (**2**)	Sep 13, 2019	Heather Hardy	UD 10/10
2	Amanda Serrano	**WBC** Featherweight	Feb 4, 2021	**Interim promoted**	
2	Amanda Serrano	**IBF** Featherweight	Sep 24, 2022	Sarah Mahfoud	UD 10/10
2	Amanda Serrano	**The Ring** Featherweight	Sep 24, 2022	Sarah Mahfoud	UD 10/10
2	Amanda Serrano	**WBA** Featherweight	Feb 4, 2023	Erika Cruz	UD 10/10
3	Naoko Fujioka	**WBC** Mini flyweight	May 8, 2011	Anabel Ortiz	RTD 8/10
3	Naoko Fujioka	**WBA** Super flyweight	Nov 13, 2013	Naoko Yamaguchi	UD 10/10
3	Naoko Fujioka	**WBO** Bantamweight	Oct 19, 2015	Hee Jung Yuh	UD 10/10
3	Naoko Fujioka	**WBA** Flyweight	**Mar 13, 2017**	Isabel Millan	TKO 10/10
4	Hanna Gabriels	**WBO** Welterweight	Dec 19, 2009	Gabriela Marcela Zapata	KO 4/10
4	Hanna Gabriels	**WBO** Light middleweight	May 9, 2010	Gardy Pena Alvarez	TKO 1/10
4	Hanna Gabriels	**WBO** Light middleweight – (**2**)	Dec 20, 2014	Paty Ramirez	TKO 2/10
4	Hanna Gabriels	**WBA** Light middleweight	Jun 18, 2016	Katia Alvariño	TKO 3/10
4	Hanna Gabriels	**WBA** Light heavyweight	**Apr 17, 2021**	Martha Gaytán	TKO 2/10
4	Hanna Gabriels	**WBC** Heavyweight	**Apr 17, 2021**	Martha Gaytán	TKO 2/10
5	Claressa Shields	**IBF** Super middleweight	Aug 4, 2017	Nikki Adler	TKO 5/10
5	Claressa Shields	**WBC** Super middleweight	Aug 4, 2017	Nikki Adler	TKO 5/10
5	Claressa Shields	**IBF** Middleweight	Jun 22, 2018	Hanna Gabriel	UD 10/10
5	Claressa Shields	**WBA** Middleweight	Jun 22, 2018	Hanna Gabriel	UD 10/10
5	Claressa Shields	**WBC** Middleweight	Nov 17, 2018	Hannah Rankin	UD 10/10
5	Claressa Shields	**WBO** Middleweight	Apr 13, 2019	Christina Hammer	UD 10/10
5	Claressa Shields	**The Ring** Middleweight	Apr 13, 2019	Christina Hammer	UD 10/10
5	Claressa Shields	**WBC** Light middleweight	Jan 10, 2020	Ivana Habazin	UD 10/10
5	Claressa Shields	**WBO** Light middleweight	Jan 10, 2020	Ivana Habazin	UD 10/10
5	Claressa Shields	**IBF** Light middleweight	Mar 5, 2021	Marie-Eve Dicaire	UD 10/10
5	Claressa Shields	**WBA** (Super) Light middleweight	Mar 5, 2021	Marie-Eve Dicaire	UD 10/10
5	Claressa Shields	**The Ring** Light middleweight	Mar 5, 2021	Marie-Eve Dicaire	UD 10/10
5	Claressa Shields	**WBO** Middleweight – (**2**)	Oct 15, 2022	Savannah Marshall	UD 10/10
5	Claressa Shields	**WBO** Light heavyweight	**Jul 27, 2024**	Vanessa Lepage-Joanisse	TKO 2/10
5	Claressa Shields	**WBA** Middleweight – (**2**)	Aug 16, 2026	Kaye Scott	TKO 6/10
5	Claressa Shields	**WBC** Middleweight – (**2**)	Aug 16, 2026	Kaye Scott	TKO 6/10

=== Women's quadruple champion notes ===
- Dates in bold format signify the date when they won their 4th division title.
- Interim titles are not included unless they get promoted to the official champion.

== Only quadruple division champion in the original eight weight classes ==
In the entire history of boxing, only Manny Pacquiao has successfully conquered four divisions in the original eight weight classes.

Inducted into the International Boxing Hall of Fame
World Titles from The Ring

No.	Name	Titles	Date	Opponent	Result
1	Manny Pacquiao	**WBC** Flyweight	Dec 4, 1998	Chatchai Sasakul	KO 8/12
1	Manny Pacquiao	**The Ring** Featherweight	Nov 15, 2003	Marco Antonio Barrera	TKO 11/12
1	Manny Pacquiao	**WBC** Lightweight	Jun 28, 2008	David Díaz	TKO 9/12
1	Manny Pacquiao	**WBO** Welterweight	**Nov 14, 2009**	Miguel Cotto	TKO 12/12
1	Manny Pacquiao	**WBO** Welterweight – (**2**)	Apr 12, 2014	Timothy Bradley	UD 12/12
1	Manny Pacquiao	**WBO** Welterweight – (**3**)	Nov 5, 2016	Jessie Vargas	UD 12/12
1	Manny Pacquiao	**WBA** (Super) Welterweight	Jul 20, 2019	Keith Thurman	SD 12/12

=== Quadruple division notes ===
- Dates in bold format signify the date when they won their 4th division title.

== Quadruple champions who won titles in other multiple divisions ==
Some fighters of this group or club were not satisfied to win just the big milestone of championships in four different weight divisions but to reach immortality in five, six and/or seven other different divisions or categories. The multiple champions who won titles in:

- Five divisions are called Quintuple champions (see the List of boxing quintuple champions);
- Six divisions are called Sextuple champions (see the List of boxing sextuple champions);
- Seven divisions are called Septuple champions (see the List of boxing septuple champions); and
- Eight divisions are called Octuple champions

== See also ==
- List of boxing quintuple champions
- List of boxing septuple champions
- List of boxing sextuple champions
- List of boxing triple champions
- List of current world boxing champions
- List of IBF world champions
- List of The Ring world champions
- List of WBA world champions
- List of WBC world champions
- List of WBO world champions
- Octuple champion
