= Pernell Whitaker vs. Gary Jacobs =

Boxing match

Summer's Blockbuster
- Date: August 26, 1995
- Venue: Convention Hall, Atlantic City, New Jersey, U.S.
- Title(s) on the line: WBC welterweight title

Tale of the tape
Boxer	Pernell Whitaker	Gary Jacobs
Nickname	Sweet Pea	The Kid
Hometown	Norfolk, Virginia, U.S.	Glasgow, Scotland
Purse	$1,500,000	$200,000
Pre-fight record	35–1–1 (15 KO)	41–5 (23 KO)
Age	31 years, 7 months	29 years, 8 months
Height	5 ft 6 in (168 cm)	5 ft 7 in (170 cm)
Weight	147 lb (67 kg)	147 lb (67 kg)
Style	Southpaw	Southpaw
Recognition	WBC; Welterweight champion The Ring; No. 1 Ranked Welterweight; The Ring No. 1 ranked pound-for-pound fighter 4-division world champion	WBC; No. 1 Ranked Welterweight

Result
- Whitaker wins via unanimous decision (118–109, 118–107, 117–109)

Pernell Whitaker vs. Gary Jacobs, billed as Summer's Blockbuster, was a professional boxing match contested on August 26, 1995 for the WBC welterweight title.

== Background ==
In his previous fight, Pernell Whitaker had won the WBA super welterweight from Julio César Vásquez to become the fourth man to win world titles in four different weight classes. Immediately following the victory, Whitaker would vacate the super welterweight title and announced that he would return to the welterweight division to make a mandatory defense of his WBC welterweight title against Gary Jacobs. Jacobs was the number-one ranked welterweight contender by the WBC but was not viewed as a serious threat to Whitaker and was instilled as a 20–1 underdog. When Whitaker was asked about his quality of opponent, he stated "I don't pick and choose who I fight. This is something I have to do if I'm going to represent the WBC."

Then-WBA welterweight champion Ike Quartey was originally scheduled to defend his title against Andrew Murray on the undercard, but Quartey instead made the defense in France three days prior.

== The fight ==
Whitaker got off to a sluggish start as Jacobs did well leading with his jab and slipping Whitaker's punches. However, Whitaker would eventually take control from the fifth round on. In the 11th round, Jacobs was incorrectly credited with a knockdown after Whitaker missed with a wild left hook and his momentum sent him to the canvas after Jacobs had tapped him on his body with a right, though replays showed that it should have been ruled a slip. In the 12th and final round, Whitaker would score two knockdowns in the final 30 seconds, first dropping Jacobs face first on the canvas following a left hand. After Jacobs got back up with 10 seconds remaining, Whitaker quickly attack and sent him down again with another left. Jacobs would again get back up just as the bell rang to end the fight and the fight would go to the scorecards. All three scorecards were lopsided in Whitaker's favor, who won unanimously with scores of 118–109, 118–107 and 117–109.

== Aftermath ==
Following the fight, Whitaker admitted that then-IBF super middleweight Roy Jones Jr., who was commentating the fight for HBO, had suggested to Whitaker to attack Jacobs with body punches, stating "It took me four or five rounds to figure out what in the world Gary Jacobs was doing, Roy Jones was mouthing to me that I needed to work the body more. Hey, my corner does a great job, but I could use a little help in there."

== Fight card ==
Confirmed bouts:

Weight Class	Weight		vs.		Method	Round	Notes
Welterweight	147 lb	Pernell Whitaker (c)	def.	Gary Jacobs	UD	12	^{Note 1}
Heavyweight	200+ lb	David Tua	def.	Mauricio Villegas	TKO	6/10
Welterweight	147 lb	Larry Barnes	def.	Benji Singleton	PTS	10
Heavyweight	200+ lb	Andrew Golota	def.	West Turner	TKO	1/8
Welterweight	147 lb	Jermal Corbin	def.	Jose Miguel Fernandez	TKO	3/6

^Note 1 For WBC and lineal Welterweight titles

== Broadcasting ==
Country	Broadcaster
United Kingdom	Sky Sports
United States	HBO

Preceded by vs. Julio César Vásquez	Pernell Whitaker's bouts 26 August 1995	Succeeded by vs. Jake Rodríguez
Preceded by vs. Jose Miguel Fernandez	Gary Jacobs's bouts 26 August 1995	Succeeded by vs. Leigh Wicks
