= Pernell Whitaker vs. Jake Rodríguez =

Boxing match

Collision Course
- Date: November 18, 1995
- Venue: Convention Hall, Atlantic City, New Jersey, U.S.
- Title(s) on the line: WBC and Lineal welterweight titles

Tale of the tape
Boxer	Pernell Whitaker	Jake Rodríguez
Nickname	Sweet Pea	The Snake
Hometown	Norfolk, Virginia, U.S.	Arroyo, Puerto Rico
Pre-fight record	36–1–1 (15 KO)	28–3–2 (8 KO)
Age	31 years, 10 months	30 years, 1 month
Height	5 ft 6 in (168 cm)	5 ft 8 in (173 cm)
Weight	147 lb (67 kg)	146 lb (66 kg)
Style	Southpaw	Southpaw
Recognition	WBC & Lineal; Welterweight champion The Ring; No. 1 Ranked Welterweight; The Ring No. 1 ranked pound-for-pound fighter	The Ring; No. 6 Ranked Light Welterweight; Former IBF light welterweight champion

Result
- Whitaker wins via fourth-round knockout

Pernell Whitaker vs. Jake Rodríguez, billed as Collision Course, was a professional boxing match contested on November 18, 1995 for the WBC and lineal welterweight titles.

== Background ==
For the fifth defense of his WBC and lineal welterweight titles, Pernell Whitaker was matched against Jake Rodríguez. Rodríguez was a former IBF light welterweight champion had previously been the chief sparring partner of Whitaker's, working as such for both of Whitaker's previous fights against Julio César Vásquez and Gary Jacobs. Having sparred with Rodríguez for 100 rounds, it was one of the rare occasions that Whitaker had come into a fight with knowledge of his opponent as he did not study any video of his opponents prior to his fights. Whitaker would enter the fight as a 10–1 favorite over Rodríguez.

The co-main event featured Félix Trinidad defending his IBF welterweight title against the IBF's number-one ranked contender Larry Barnes. Trinidad would win the fight by technical knockout in the fourth round. The expected victories of Trinidad and Whitaker was expected to set up a unification bout between the two welterweight champions at some point in 1996. However, the two fighters were unable to reach an agreement to face one another until 1999.

== The fight ==
Whitaker had little trouble with Rodríguez, using his superior hand-speed and counter punching to dominate the fight. After five one-sided rounds in his favor, Whitaker would end the fight in the sixth. Midway through the round, a series of body shots followed by a right-left combination sent Rodríguez to his knees. Rodríguez would get up and continue the fight but Whitaker sent him down again with a left hand to the body. Rodríguez was unable to answer the 10-count and Whitaker was named the winner by knockout at 2:45 of the round. It was Whitaker's first knockout in a title fight since his KO of Juan Nazario in 1990.

== Fight card ==
Confirmed bouts:

Weight Class	Weight		vs.		Method	Round	Notes
Welterweight	147 lb	Pernell Whitaker (c)	def.	Jake Rodríguez	KO	6/12	^{Note 1}
Welterweight	147 lb	Félix Trinidad (c)	def.	Larry Barnes	TKO	4/12	^{Note 2}
Lightweight	135 lb	Santos Lopez	def.	Eddie Hopson	TKO	10/10
Heavyweight	200+ lb	Andrew Golota	def.	Jason Waller	TKO	2/10
Lightweight	135 lb	Jeff Fenech	def.	Tialano Tovar	TKO	8/10
Welterweight	147 lb	Jermal Corbin	def.	Otilio Villarreal	MD	8
Heavyweight	200+ lb	Gary Bell	def.	Jameel McCline	KO	1/4

^Note 1 For WBC and lineal Welterweight titles
^Note 2 For IBF Welterweight title

Preceded by vs. Gary Jacobs	Pernell Whitaker's bouts 18 November 1995	Succeeded by vs. Wilfredo Rivera
Preceded by vs. Homer Gibbins	Jake Rodríguez's bouts 18 November 1995	Succeeded by vs. Charles Murray
