= Pernell Whitaker vs. Buddy McGirt II =

Boxing match

The Final Say
- Date: October 1, 1994
- Venue: The Scope, Norfolk, Virginia, U.S.
- Title(s) on the line: WBC welterweight title

Tale of the tape
Boxer	Pernell Whitaker	James McGirt
Nickname	Sweet Pea	Buddy
Hometown	Norfolk, Virginia, U.S.	Brentwood, New York, U.S.
Purse	$2,500,000	$600,000
Pre-fight record	33–1–1 (15 KO)	64–3–1 (44 KO)
Age	30 years, 8 months	30 years, 8 months
Height	5 ft 6 in (168 cm)	5 ft 6 1/2 in (169 cm)
Weight	147 lb (67 kg)	146 lb (66 kg)
Style	Southpaw	Orthodox
Recognition	WBC; Welterweight Champion; The Ring; No. 1 Ranked Welterweight; The Ring No. 1 ranked pound-for-pound fighter 3-division world champion	WBC; No. 1 Ranked Welterweight; The Ring; No. 4 Ranked Welterweight; 2-division world champion

Result
- Whitaker wins via 12-round unanimous decision (118–112, 117–112, 117–110)

Pernell Whitaker vs. Buddy McGirt II, billed as The Final Say, was a professional boxing match contested on October 1, 1994, for Whitaker's WBC welterweight title.

== Background ==
Following a hotly disputed draw with Julio César Chávez, reigning WBC welterweight Pernell Whitaker would then return to his hometown of Norfolk, Virginia to make a successful defense against Santos Cardona, winning by an easy unanimous decision. Following his win over Cardona, Whitaker would next agree to a rematch with James "Buddy" McGirt. Whitaker and McGirt had fought the previous year, with Whitaker scoring a close unanimous decision to capture McGirt's WBC welterweight title. Following the fight, McGirt would undergo surgery for a torn rotator cuff, an injury that had plagued him throughout both the Whitaker fight and his previous title defense against Genaro Léon. Though expected to be out of boxing for a year, McGirt would return 7 months later with a unanimous decision victory over Nick Rupa. McGirt would ultimately go 5–0 after his first loss to Whitaker and insisted on a rematch, calling Whitaker a "punk" and accusing him of ducking him.

== The fight ==
Unlike their close first fight, Whitaker would dominate most of the fight and won by a lopsided unanimous decision. Though Whitaker controlled most of the fight, McGirt would score the only knockdown of the fight, sending Whitaker down on the seat of his pants after landing a right hand. Knockdown notwithstanding, Whitaker threw a considerable amount of punches more than McGirt, throwing 816 punches of which he landed 330 for a 40% success rate, while McGirt only landed 154 of his 504 thrown punches for a 31% rate. The fight would go the full 12 rounds and all three of the judge's scorecards had Whitaker winning comfortably with scores of 118–112, 117–112 and 117–110.

== Aftermath ==
Whitaker said of the knockdown "It was just a flash knockdown, it caught me off balance, it didn't bother me at all. It made me more aware of what I had to do. I still think I got the round."

== Fight card ==
Confirmed bouts:

Weight Class	Weight		vs.		Method	Round	Notes
Welterweight	147 lb	Pernell Whitaker (c)	def.	James McGirt	UD	12/12	^{Note 1}
Heavyweight	200+ lb	David Tua	def.	Ken Lakusta	KO	4/10
Light Middleweight	154 lb	Raúl Márquez	def.	Darryl Cherry	KO	6/10
Cruiserweight	190 lb	Jade Scott	def.	Stacy McSwain	TKO	2/10
Light Welterweight	140 lb	Dorin Spivey	def.	James Edwards	TKO	4/4
Heavyweight	200+ lb	Courage Tshabalala	def.	Ken Williams	RTD	1/4

^Note 1 For WBC and Lineal Welterweight titles

== Broadcasting ==
Country	Broadcaster
United States	HBO

Preceded by vs. Santos Cardona	Pernell Whitaker's bouts 1 October 1994	Succeeded by vs. Julio César Vásquez
Preceded by vs. Kevin Pompey	Buddy McGirt's bouts 1 October 1994	Succeeded by vs. Buck Smith
