= Vinny Pazienza vs. Roberto Durán II =

Boxing match

A Matter of Pride
- Date: January 14, 1995
- Venue: Convention Hall, Atlantic City, New Jersey
- Title(s) on the line: IBC super middleweight title

Tale of the tape
Boxer	Vinny Pazienza	Roberto Durán
Nickname	The Pazmanian Devil	Manos de Piedra ("Hands of Stone")
Hometown	Cranston, Rhode Island, U.S.	Panama City, Panama Province, Panama
Purse	$750,000	$619,000
Pre-fight record	39–5 (27 KO)	93–10 (67 KO)
Age	32 years	43 years, 6 months
Height	5 ft 7 1/2 in (171 cm)	5 ft 7 1/2 in (171 cm)
Weight	168 lb (76 kg)	168 lb (76 kg)
Style	Orthodox	Orthodox
Recognition	WBC/The Ring; No. 5 Ranked Super Middleweight; WBA; No. 7 Ranked Super Middleweight; IBC super middleweight champion 2-division world champion	4-division world champion

Result
- Pazienza wins via unanimous decision (118-110, 117-111, 116-112)

Vinny Pazienza vs. Roberto Durán II, billed as A Matter of Pride, was a professional boxing match contested on January 14, 1995, for the IBC super middleweight title.

== Background ==
Durán and Pazienza had first fought just over six months prior at the MGM Grand Garden Arena in a pay-per-view bout broadcast by HBO. Though Durán got off to a good start and scored the fight's lone knockdown, Pazienza took control during the fight's later rounds and was awarded a lopsided unanimous decision that proved to be somewhat controversial as the fight appeared closer than what the scorecards showed. Pazienza would admit that he was unhappy with his performance while Durán maintained that he was rightful winner. Going into the first fight, it was uncertain if the now 43-year old Durán would continue his boxing career should he lose, but when asked about retirement, Durán responded "No, I will fight. I just hope Vinny will give me another shot." to which Pazienza replied "Let's do it again."

The rematch was officially announced in November 1994 to take place in January. Prior to the announcement of the rematch, both fighters took tune-up fights in the interim. First, Durán would meet unknown Heath Todd in October, easily dispatching him by sixth round referee technical decision. Pazienza, meanwhile, would face another virtual unknown in Rafael Williams in November, however he struggled mightily and barely outpointed Williams in a close unanimous decision. Pazienza, who was booed after the decision was announced and at the post-fight press conference, admitted to taking Williams lightly stating "I didn’t train as hard as I usually do, I didn’t want to burn out before the Duran fight."

== The fight ==
Pazienza dominated Durán en route to another unanimous decision victory. Like their previous fight, Durán was aggressive in the early rounds attempting to stay in close and attack Pazienza's body, but Durán quickly tired and Pazienza used his superior quickness to pepper Durán with combinations, right uppercuts and left hooks while eluding Durán's offense throughout the duration of the fight. All three judge's scorecards were overwhelmingly in favor of Pazienza's favor with scores of 118–110, 117-111 and 116–112.

== Aftermath ==
Durán, who again shot down retirement rumors, blamed his poor performance on overtraining claiming "I over trained, and my arm hurt a bit. I wanted to move, but I was all tied up tonight." He also alleged that Pazienza had used performance-enhancing drugs stating that Pazienza fought "like he has dope in his body." Pazienza, meanwhile, turned his attention to a potential super middleweight championship match with the then-top pound-for-pound fighter in the sport Roy Jones Jr., who was in attendance to witness Pazienza's defeat of Durán.

== Fight card ==
Confirmed bouts:

Weight Class	Weight		vs.		Method	Round	Notes
Super Middleweight	168 lbs.	Vinny Pazienza	def.	Roberto Durán	UD	12/12	^{Note 1}
Welterweight	147 lbs.	Héctor Camacho	def.	Todd Foster	TKO	5/12
Light Heavyweight	175 lbs.	John Marceta	def.	Matthew Charlston	TKO	9/10
Welterweight	147 lbs.	Larry Barnes	def.	Hilario Mercedes	UD	10/10
Middleweight	160 lbs.	Aaron Davis	def.	Dennis Milton	TKO	3/8

^Note 1 For IBC Super Middleweight title

== Broadcasting ==
Country	Broadcaster
United States	HBO

Preceded by vs. Rafael Williams	Vinny Pazienza's bouts 14 January 1995	Succeeded by vs. Roy Jones Jr.
Preceded by vs. Heath Todd	Roberto Durán's bouts 14 January 1995	Succeeded by vs. Roni Martinez
