= Pernell Whitaker vs. Julio César Vásquez =

Boxing match

Showdown of Champions
- Date: March 4, 1995
- Venue: Convention Hall, Atlantic City, New Jersey, U.S.
- Title(s) on the line: WBA super welterweight title

Tale of the tape
| Boxer | Julio César Vásquez | Pernell Whitaker |
| Nickname | "El Zurdo" | "Sweet Pea" |
| Hometown | Santa Fe, Argentina | Norfolk, Virginia, U.S. |
| Purse | $500,000 | $1,500,000 |
| Pre-fight record | 53–1 (35 KO) | 34–1–1 (15 KO) |
| Age | 28 years, 7 months | 31 years, 2 months |
| Height | 5 ft 10 in (178 cm) | 5 ft 5 1/2 in (166 cm) |
| Weight | 153 3/4 lb (70 kg) | 153 3/4 lb (70 kg) |
| Style | Southpaw | Southpaw |
| Recognition | WBA; Super Welterweight Champion; The Ring; No. 1 Ranked Light Middleweight | WBC; Welterweight Champion; The Ring; No. 1 Ranked Welterweight; The Ring No. 1 ranked pound-for-pound fighter 3-division world champion |

Result
- Whitaker wins via 12-round unanimous decision (118-110, 118-107, 116-110)

Pernell Whitaker vs. Julio César Vásquez, billed as Showdown of Champions, was a professional boxing match contested on March 4, 1995 for the WBA super welterweight title.

== Background ==
In February 1995, reigning WBC welterweight champion, American Pernell Whitaker, officially announced that he would be moving up in weight to challenge Argentine Julio César Vásquez for the latter's WBA super welterweight title. Whitaker was seeking to become the fourth man in boxing history to win a world title in four different divisions joining only Sugar Ray Leonard, Thomas Hearns and Roberto Durán. Vásquez had reigned as super welterweight champion for over two years and had made 10 successful title defenses, but was virtually unknown to American audiences and had never been on as big a stage as he would be for his fight with Whitaker, something Whitaker claimed would be a detriment for him. Whitaker's time in the super welterweight division was expected to last only this fight, as he announced his intentions to go back down to welterweight should he win. Prior to the bout, Whitaker's long-time trainer George Benton had departed following a dispute with Lou Duva, whom both managed and co-trained Whitaker under his company Main Events. Benton's split from Main Event was acrimonious, claiming that Duva "didn't know boxing" and Whitaker was "arrogant and stubborn." To fill the void left by Benton, Ronnie Shields took over as Whitaker's head trainer.

== The fight ==
Whitaker would have little trouble with Vásquez, winning by an easy unanimous decision. However, for the second consecutive fight, Whitaker was knocked down by his opponent. Vásquez would score the knockdown after Whitaker showboated by dropping his hands and was caught off balance with a left hand from Vásquez, though he would recover. As the fight went on, a frustrated Vásquez was warned numerous times for holding and hitting and was deducted one point in each of the ninth and 11th rounds. When fight ended and went to the scorecards, Whitaker won clearly on all three with scores of 118–107, 118–110 and 116–110.

== Aftermath ==
Shortly following his victory, Whitaker would vacate the super welterweight title and announced that he would return to the welterweight division to make a mandatory defence of his WBC welterweight title against top ranked contender Gary Jacobs.

== Fight card ==
Confirmed bouts:

| Weight Class | Weight | | vs. | | Method | Round | Notes |
|---|---|---|---|---|---|---|---|
| Super Welterweight | 154 lb | Pernell Whitaker | def. | Julio César Vásquez (c) | UD | 12/12 | ^{Note 1} |
| Welterweight | 147 lb | Ike Quartey | def. | Jung-Oh Park | TKO | 4/12 | ^{Note 2} |
| Welterweight | 147 lb | Gary Jacobs | def. | José Miguel Fernández | UD | 10/10 |
| Heavyweight | 200+ lb | David Tua | def. | Bruce Bellocchi | TKO | 1/10 |
| Lightweight | 135 lb | Julien Lorcy | def. | Tommy Barnes | TKO | 1/8 |
| Super Welterweight | 154 lb | Aníbal Santiago Acevedo | def. | Vidal Rodriguez | KO | 5/8 |
| Heavyweight | 200+ lb | David Izon | def. | Ali Allen | KO | 2/6 |

^Note 1 For WBA Super Welterweight title
^Note 2 For WBA Welterweight title

== Broadcasting ==
| Country | Broadcaster |
|---|---|
| Mexico | TV Azteca |
| United Kingdom | Sky Sports |
| United States | HBO |

| Preceded by vs. Mike Bonislawski | Julio César Vásquez's bouts 4 March 1995 | Succeeded by vs. Ruben Ruiz |
| Preceded by vs. Buddy McGirt II | Pernell Whitaker's bouts 4 March 1995 | Succeeded by vs. Gary Jacobs |
