= Héctor Camacho vs. Vinny Pazienza =

Put Up or Shut Up
- Date: February 3, 1990
- Venue: Convention Hall, Atlantic City, New Jersey, U.S.
- Title(s) on the line: WBO light welterweight title

Tale of the tape
Boxer	Héctor Camacho	Vinny Pazienza
Nickname	Macho	The Pazmanian Devil
Hometown	Bayamón, Puerto Rico	Cranston, Rhode Island, U.S.
Purse	$800,000	$400,000
Pre-fight record	36–0 (16 KO)	26–0 (15 KO)
Age	27 years, 8 months	27 years, 1 month
Height	5 ft 6 1/2 in (169 cm)	5 ft 7 1/2 in (171 cm)
Weight	140 lb (64 kg)	138 lb (63 kg)
Style	Southpaw	Orthodox
Recognition	WBO light welterweight champion	former IBF lightweight champion

Result
- Camacho wins via 12-round unanimous decision (119–109, 117–116, 115–112)

Héctor Camacho vs. Vinny Pazienza, billed as the Put Up or Shut Up, was a professional match contested on February 3, 1990, for the WBO light welterweight title.

== Background ==
The Héctor Camacho–Vinny Pazienza WBO light welterweight title fight scheduled for February 3, 1990, was formally announced on October 10, 1989, at a press conference held at the Plaza Hotel. The bout was promoted as Put Up or Shut Up in reference to both Camacho and Pazienza's flamboyant, outspoken personalities. After the fight's announcement, the two fighters each had a tune-up bout, with Camacho appearing on the undercard of the Evander Holyfield–Alex Stewart fight in Atlantic City to defeat Raul Torres via 10-round unanimous decision on November 4, while Vinny Pazienza knocked out Eddie VanKirk in the fifth-round on November 27.

To help promote the fight, Camacho and Pazienza embarked on a five-city promotional tour during the month of December. The tour included a series of bizarre publicity stunts including; Camacho punching Pazienza at a photoshoot, Camacho referring, an altercation between Camacho and Pazienza's trainer Kevin Rooney that sent Pazienza's promoter Dan Duva to the hospital after straining ligaments in his leg, Camacho punching former opponent Ray Mancini, who was working as a commentator on the pay-per-view telecast alongside Sam Rosen, at a press conference, and Pazienza presenting Camacho with a tutu in reference to Camacho's "stick-and-move" strategy which Pazienza likened to "dancing."

Jack O'Donnell, then-president of Trump Plaza Hotel and Casino paid a reported $2.25 million to Main Events, the Duva's promotional company, to acquire the rights to the Camacho–Pazienza, and it's undercard, which included a Pernell Whitaker–Freddie Pendleton WBC/IBF unified lightweight title fight, and a WBO light heavyweight title bout between Michael Moorer and Marcellus Allen. The hotel and casino, handled virtually all aspects of the event's promotion, including the pay-per-view and site rights and advertising According to O'Donnell, "It has never happened before where a casino hotel has purchased the entire promotion, including everything from the pay-per-view rights to the advertising."

== Fight details ==
Camacho would earn the victory by unanimous decision, having been named the winner on one scorecard by the lopsided score of 119–109 (11 rounds to one), while the other two judges had him winning by closes scores of 117–116 (four rounds to three, five even) and 115–112 (seven rounds to four, one even).

Pazienza constantly moved forward, but Camacho, who mostly abandoned the jab-and-retreat tactic he had used in prior fights, often got the better of their exchanges, using his boxing skills and speed to avoid Pazienza's wildly thrown punches, and effectively counter-punching landing jabs and combinations to Pazienza's face throughout, opening up a cut on Pazienza's right eye in the third round and a gash near his left eye in the ninth. Camacho had a slight edge in punches landed, landing 133 of 442 thrown punches for 30% compared to Pazienza, who landed 118 of 451 punches, good for 26%

== Aftermath ==
Following his victory, Camacho revealed his plans to face former two-time light welterweight champion Aaron Pryor, with the two fighters having signed contracts to face each other on a date tentatively scheduled that May. Pryor, who attended the Camacho–Pazienza fight and had been inactive for over a year, stated that he couldn't "wait to get back into training" for the proposed bout. However, these plans were derailed almost immediately when Pryor, who been declared legally blind in his left eye after undergoing cataract surgery the previous year, was denied a boxing license in three of biggest boxing markets; Nevada, New York and California.

== Fight card ==
Confirmed bouts:

Weight Class	Weight		vs.		Method	Round	Notes
Light Welterweight	140 lbs.	Héctor Camacho (c)	def.	Vinny Pazienza	UD	12	^{note 1}
Light Heavyweight	175 lbs.	Michael Moorer (c)	def.	Marcellus Allen	RTD	9/12	^{note 2}
Lightweight	135 lbs.	Pernell Whitaker (c)	def.	Freddie Pendleton	UD	12	^{note 3}
Super Middleweight	168 lbs.	Rod Carr	vs.	Ralph Ward	D-TD	1/10
Cruiserweight	190 lbs.	Marc Randazzo	def.	David Bates	TKO	5/6

^Note 1 For WBO Light Welterweight Title
^Note 2 For WBO Light Heavyweight Title
^Note 3 For WBC and IBF Lightweight Title

== Broadcasting ==
Country	Broadcaster
United States	Trump Plaza Hotel and Casino pay-per-view

Preceded by vs. Raul Torres	Héctor Camacho's bouts February 3, 1990	Succeeded by vs. Tony Baltazar
Preceded by vs. Eddie VanKirk	Vinny Pazienza's bouts February 3, 1990	Succeeded by vs. Greg Haugen
