= Vallecas =

Neighborhood of Madrid, Spain

Coordinates: 40°23′N 3°37′W

Vallecas' coat of arms

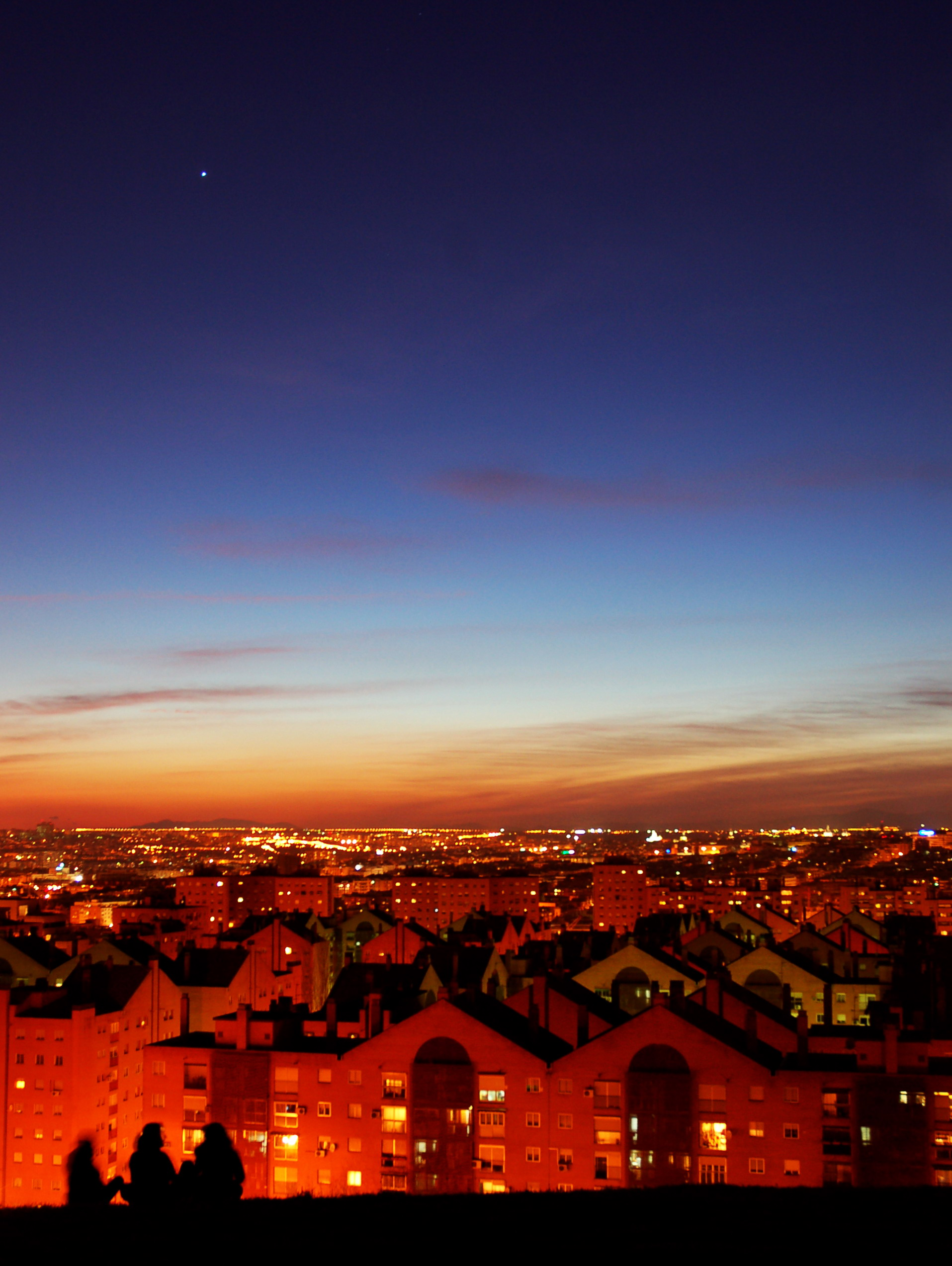
Panorama of Vallecas from Cerro del Tío Pío (at sunset).

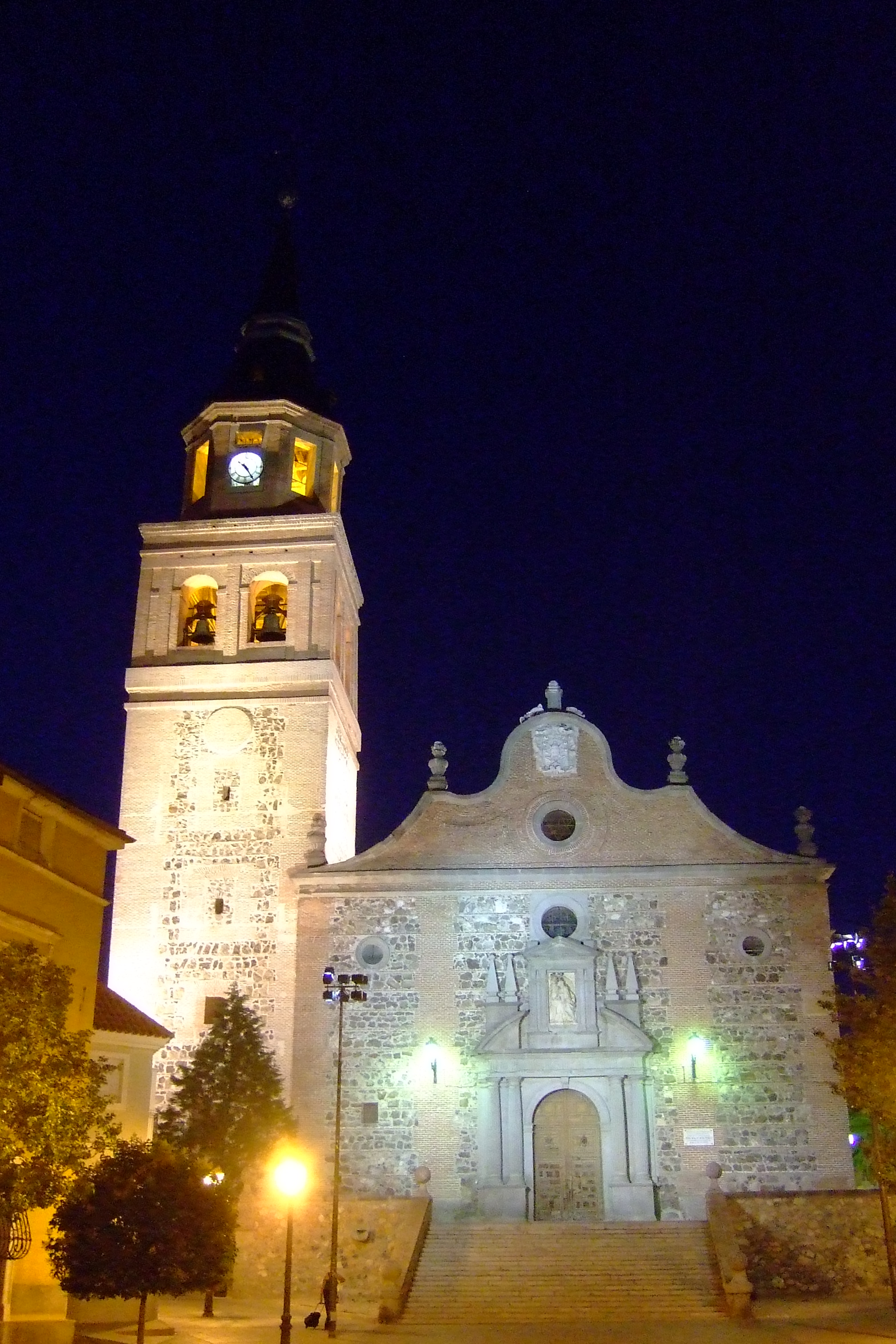
Facade of the church of saint Peter ad vincula (in chains) – Vallecas, Madrid.

Vallecas [baˈʎekas] was a municipality of Spain that disappeared as such in 1950, when its annexation to the municipality of Madrid took place. Nowadays, the territory is shared between two districts: Puente de Vallecas (population 240,917) and Villa de Vallecas (population 65,162).

== Overview ==
Vallecas is known for its working-class inhabitants who have given it the local names Vallekas or Valle del Kas. Many initiatives that take place in the district show this countercultural attitude by replacing the letter c with k, examples of these are the local radio station Radio Vallekas, the local television channel Tele K, the music festival Vallekas Rock, etc.

The local pride coalesces around the Rayo Vallecano football team.

During the 1960s, many Spanish immigrants to the Madrid conurbation settled in Vallecas, forming the largest slum area around Madrid.

During the decades of the Francoist State, Vallecas earned its reputation as a neighbourhood of resistance against Francoism.

In this tradition, Vallecas is also home to the Spanish ska band Ska-P, noted for its anarchist and leftist lyrics.

In recent years, the district of Vallecas Villa has experienced significant growth with about 25,000 new flats and houses called "PAU de Vallecas" or "Ensanche de Vallecas", one of the biggest new areas in Madrid.

Professional footballer Álvaro Negredo is from the area, as are lightweight boxer Poli Díaz, nicknamed The Colt of Vallecas and Atlético Madrid and Spain national team midfielder Koke.

== Notable people ==
- Silvia Agüero (born 1985), Spanish Roma feminist writer and human rights activist
- Poli Díaz
- Koke
- Álvaro Negredo
- Vicky López Spanish professional footballer

== See also ==
- Rayo Vallecano
- Puente de Vallecas
- Villa de Vallecas
