= Pernell Whitaker =

American boxer (1964–2019)

Personal information
- Nickname: Sweet Pea
- Born: January 2, 1964 Norfolk, Virginia, U.S.
- Died: July 14, 2019 (aged 55) Virginia Beach, Virginia, U.S.
- Height: 5 ft 6 in (168 cm)
- Weight: Lightweight; Light welterweight; Welterweight; Light middleweight

Boxing career
- Reach: 69 in (175 cm)
- Stance: Southpaw

Boxing record
- Total fights: 46
- Wins: 40
- Win by KO: 17
- Losses: 4
- Draws: 1
- No contests: 1
Medal record
Men's amateur boxing
Representing United States
Olympic Games
Gold medal – first place	1984 Los Angeles	Lightweight
Pan American Games
Gold medal – first place	1983 Caracas	Lightweight
World Championships
Silver medal – second place	1982 Munich	Lightweight

Pernell Whitaker Sr. (January 2, 1964 – July 14, 2019) was an American professional boxer who competed from 1984 to 2001, and subsequently worked as a boxing trainer. He was a four-weight world champion, having won titles at lightweight, light welterweight, welterweight, and light middleweight; the undisputed lightweight world title; and the lineal lightweight and welterweight world titles. In 1989, Whitaker was named Fighter of the Year by The Ring magazine and the Boxing Writers Association of America. He currently holds the longest unified lightweight championship reign in boxing history at six title defenses. Whitaker is generally regarded as one of the greatest defensive boxers of all time.

As an amateur, Whitaker won a silver medal in the lightweight division at the 1982 World Championships, followed by gold at the 1983 Pan American Games and 1984 Olympics. After his retirement in 2001, Whitaker returned to the sport as a trainer. In 2002, The Ring ranked him tenth in their list of "The 100 Greatest Fighters of the Last 80 Years". In 2006, Whitaker was inducted into the International Boxing Hall of Fame, in his first year of eligibility.

== Amateur career ==
Whitaker had an extensive amateur boxing career, having started at the age of nine. He had 214 amateur fights, winning 201, 91 of them by knockouts, though he said that he had up to 500 amateur fights. He lost to two-time Gold Glove Champ of Catskill James Mongey at the final of the World Championships 1982 but beat him four other times, notably in the final of the Pan American Games 1983 in Caracas. He crowned his amateur career with an Olympic gold medal in 1984, beating Puerto Rican Luis Ortiz to obtain it.

== Professional career ==
=== Lightweight ===
In just his eleventh and twelfth pro bouts, Whitaker defeated former world champion Alfredo Layne on December 20, 1986, and former WBA and lineal Super Featherweight and WBC Light Welterweight title holder Roger Mayweather on March 28, 1987. Whitaker won both bouts before hometown crowds at the Norfolk Scope, less than a mile from where he lived as a child in a Norfolk housing project. Whitaker would fight nine times in the Scope arena during his career.

On March 12, 1988, he challenged José Luis Ramírez for the WBC lightweight world title in Levallois, France. He suffered his first pro defeat when the judges awarded a close split decision to Ramirez. This was considered a highly controversial decision, as many boxing analysts had Whitaker winning the fight.

==== Undisputed lightweight champion ====
Whitaker trudged on, winning a decision over Greg Haugen for the IBF lightweight world title on February 18, 1989, becoming the first boxer to knock Haugen down by sending him to the mat in the sixth round. He then added the vacant WBC & The Ring belts by avenging his loss to Ramirez on August 20.

Now a champion, Whitaker proceeded to dominate boxing's middle divisions over the first half of the 1990s. In 1990, he defended his Lightweight title against future champion Freddie Pendleton and Super Featherweight Champion Azumah Nelson of Ghana. On August 11, 1990, he knocked out Juan Nazario in one round to win the WBA and vacant lineal lightweight titles, becoming the first Undisputed Lightweight Champion since Roberto Durán. His highlight of 1991 was a win over Jorge Páez and a fight against European Champion Poli Díaz that ended in another win.

=== IBF light welterweight champion ===
In 1992, he began his ascent in weight, winning the IBF light welterweight world title from Colombian puncher Rafael Pineda on July 18.

=== WBC and lineal welterweight champion ===
On March 6, 1993, he decisioned Buddy McGirt to become the Lineal and WBC welterweight world champion.

==== Whitaker vs. Chávez ====
Whitaker was gaining momentum and boxing experts and fans felt that he needed to win against the pound for pound best boxer in the world: Julio César Chávez. The two met in a welterweight superfight simply named "The Fight" on September 10, 1993, in San Antonio, Texas. In the eyes of many of the spectators, Whitaker outboxed the Mexican legend. While one judge did score the fight in favor of Whitaker (115–113), the other 2 judges saw an even bout (115–115), resulting in a majority draw. Sports Illustrated's post-fight edition had "ROBBED!" across the cover and they believed that Whitaker had won no less than 9 of the 12 rounds in the fight. The now-defunct “Bert Sugar's Boxing Illustrated" magazine had a heading on the cover of its post-fight edition telling readers not to buy the issue if they really believed "The Fight" was a draw.

Whitaker continued on to dominate for the next few years, defending his welterweight title against Santos Cardona on April 9, 1994, and in a rematch against McGirt on October 1, 1994.

=== WBA super welterweight champion ===
In his next fight on March 4, 1995, Whitaker added Julio César Vásquez's WBA super welterweight world title to his collection. Early on, Vasquez was the aggressor, and scored a flash knockdown on Whitaker in the 4th round; but Whitaker settled in & used his accuracy and defense to take over and outpoint Vasquez en route to a unanimous decision win. This was a history making fight for Whitaker, as he became only the fourth fighter in history - joining Thomas Hearns, Sugar Ray Leonard, and Roberto Durán - to have won a legitimate world title in four different weight classes. However, he chose to move back to welterweight.

=== Return to welterweight ===
Whitaker successfully defended his WBC belt against Scotland's Gary Jacobs on August 26, 1995. In January, 1997, Whitaker put his title on the line against Cuban fighter Diosbelys Hurtado. Hurtado gave Whitaker all he could handle and then some. Hurtado had Whitaker down on all the judges scorecards going into the 11th round: Hurtado scored flash knockdowns against Whitaker in rounds 1 and 6, and Whitaker had a point deducted in the 9th round for hitting Hurtado behind the head. But midway in the 11th round, Whitaker landed a left hook that hurt Hurtado; and in a rare display of aggression and power, Whitaker unleashed a barrage of left-handed power shots, pummeling Hurtado into the ropes, knocking Hurtado out and almost completely out of the ring before referee Arthur Mercante Jr. stopped the fight at the 1:52 mark, giving Whitaker the come-from-behind TKO win. The win set up a showdown with undefeated 1992 Olympic gold medalist Oscar De La Hoya.

==== Whitaker vs. De La Hoya ====
He met Oscar De La Hoya on April 12, 1997, in Las Vegas, Nevada. Whitaker, defending his WBC championship and the mythical status as the best boxer in the world, pound for pound, succeeded in making De La Hoya look bad through his crafty defense, but he was unable to mount a sufficient offense to convince the judges. Whitaker was awarded an official knockdown in the 9th round and, according to CompuBox stats, outlanded De La Hoya in overall punches and connect percentage, using the jab as his primary weapon; but De La Hoya threw and landed almost twice as many power punches and had a slightly higher power punch connect percentage than Whitaker and showed more aggression in the fight, which may have factored into De La Hoya winning by a somewhat disputed unanimous decision. At the end of the fight, the judges' scores were 115–111, 116–110, 116–110. Many ringside observers felt the fight was much closer than the scorecards showed, and some had Whitaker winning the fight.

For his part, De La Hoya wasn't too pleased with his own performance against Whitaker and had hinted at a possible rematch to prove that he could do better against him. But Bob Arum, De La Hoya's promoter at that time, decided against it.

Whitaker's next bout was against Russian-born fighter Andrey Pestryayev in a world title elimination fight, where the winner would earn an automatic #1 contender spot for the WBA welterweight crown, held at the time by Ike Quartey. Whitaker originally won the fight, but the win was nullified & changed to a No Decision after he failed a post-fight drug test, testing positive for cocaine. Whitaker was suspended for six months, but the commission lifted the suspension after he agreed to random testing and his title bout with Quartey was to proceed as scheduled, however, the bout was cancelled after Whitaker tested positive for a second time.

==== Whitaker vs. Trinidad ====
On February 20, 1999, Whitaker suffered his first convincing defeat against the much bigger, much fresher Félix Trinidad, gamely taking the Puerto Rican the distance in an attempt to win Trinidad's IBF welterweight world title. The fight began with both boxers displaying aggressive styles, which included excessive pushing. In the following rounds, both boxers used their jabs most of the time, with Trinidad gaining an advantage when Whitaker attempted to attack inside, eventually scoring a knockdown in round two. In the fourth, fifth and sixth rounds the fighters exchanged combinations. Later in the fight, both boxers fell to the canvas in what were ruled as "accidental slips." In the seventh round, Whitaker displayed more offense, trading power punches with Trinidad, but the champion retained control of the fight's tempo during the eight, ninth and tenth rounds. In the last round, Whitaker, with a badly swollen right eye, displayed a purely defensive stance, avoiding his opponent throughout the round while Trinidad continued on the offensive until the fight concluded. The judges gave the champion scores of 117–111, 118–109 and 118–109.

His last fight came on April 27, 2001, against journeyman Carlos Bojorquez. Whitaker, the former lightweight, entered the ring at 155 pounds. He broke his clavicle in round four and was forced to retire; at the time of the stoppage Whitaker was trailing in all the judges' scorecards by 28–29. Following this fight, Whitaker officially announced his retirement. He finished his professional career with an official record of 40–4–1 (17 knockouts).

In 2002, The Ring ranked Whitaker as the 10th Greatest Fighter of the Last 80 Years.

On December 7, 2006, Whitaker was inducted in the International Boxing Hall of Fame along with contemporaries Roberto Durán and Ricardo López. They were all elected in their first year of eligibility.

== Boxing style ==
A southpaw, Whitaker was known for his outstanding defensive skills and for being a strong counterpuncher. He was not a particularly hard puncher or knockout artist, but applied a consistent offense while being extremely elusive and difficult for his opponents to hit with a solid punch. Whitaker used a variety of different guards, including a hands down guard relying on only head movement to evade punches. Yet he is most known for his use of the Philly Shell taught to him by his trainer George Benton.

== Career as a trainer ==
In December 2005 Whitaker became a boxing trainer in his home state of Virginia. While the decline of speed and agility pushed him into retirement, his knowledge of the ring and competitive boxing's components led him to seek out up-and-coming boxers to train to fight in the manner in which he did.

His first fighter, Dorin Spivey fought matches in 2006. He later trained young prospect Joel Julio.

Whitaker was also the trainer for heavyweight Calvin Brock who, as recently as November 2006, fought for the IBF and IBO titles against Wladimir Klitschko, wherein Brock was knocked out in the 7th round.

Whitaker also trained former IBF world champion Paul Spadafora between 2009 and 2010 for 3 fights in which Spadafora won all three.

In 2010, Whitaker was inducted into the Hampton Roads Sports Hall of Fame, honoring those who have contributed to sports in southeastern Virginia.

Whitaker also became the head trainer of former undisputed welterweight champion Zab Judah, who defeated Kaizer Mabuza in March 2011 to win the vacant IBF light welterweight title.

== Personal life ==
Pernell Whitaker was born in Norfolk, Virginia on January 2, 1964, the son of Raymond Whitaker Sr. and his wife, Novella. He had two brothers and four sisters.

Pernell married Rovanda Anthony on December 21, 1985, in the boxing ring at the Virginia Beach Pavilion Convention Center. The couple later divorced. They had four children together. Pernell also had a daughter from a prior relationship.

Pernell graduated from Booker T. Washington High School in 1982 and later received an honorary bachelor's degree from Norfolk State University. His humble beginnings started in Youngs Park Housing Community where he was inspired to start his boxing career. Outside of the ring, Sweet Pea served his community and the youth in everything that he did. He sponsored many events at Norfolk State University and spent countless hours training youth at boxing camps and gyms. He also remained active in Norfolk and spoke at city council meetings on behalf of the residents in support of community improvements.

Pernell had personal struggles and in June 2002 was convicted of cocaine possession after a judge found he violated the terms of a previous sentence by overdosing on cocaine in March. In February 2014, Pernell made national headlines after he evicted his mother, Novella Whitaker, out of the house he purchased for her shortly after he turned pro. Apparently, back taxes were owed on the house and Pernell said that neither his mother nor his siblings, who also stayed in the house, were doing anything to help keep the house afloat financially. Pernell's lawyers said that he is not making the same kind of money as a trainer that he was as a boxer, and needed to sell off the home to satisfy the tax debt owed in order to prevent the property from being seized and put into foreclosure. Outside of the Virginia courtroom where the eviction proceedings took place, he called the ruling in his favor "a beautiful moment."

== Death ==
At about 10 p.m. on July 14, 2019, Whitaker was crossing the street in Virginia Beach, at the intersection of Northampton Boulevard and Baker Road, when he was struck and killed by a vehicle. He was 55. An autopsy stated that the cause of Whitaker's death was "multiple blunt force trauma."

== Professional boxing record ==
46 fights	40 wins	4 losses
By knockout	17	1
By decision	23	3
Draws	1	
No contests	1	

No.	Result	Record	Opponent	Type	Round, time	Date	Location	Notes
46	Loss	40–4–1 (1)	Carlos Bojorquez	TKO	4 (10), 0:27	Apr 27, 2001	Caesars Tahoe, Stateline, Nevada, U.S.	Bout stopped due to Whitaker's broken clavicle
45	Loss	40–3–1 (1)	Félix Trinidad	UD	12	Feb 20, 1999	Madison Square Garden, New York City, New York, U.S.	For IBF welterweight title
44	NC	40–2–1 (1)	Andrey Pestryayev	UD	12	Oct 17, 1997	Foxwoods Resort Casino, Ledyard, Connecticut, U.S.	Originally a UD win for Whitaker, later ruled an NC after he failed a drug test
43	Loss	40–2–1	Oscar De La Hoya	UD	12	Apr 12, 1997	Thomas & Mack Center, Paradise, Nevada, U.S.	Lost WBC welterweight title
42	Win	40–1–1	Diosbelys Hurtado	TKO	11 (12), 1:52	Jan 24, 1997	Convention Hall, Atlantic City, New Jersey, U.S.	Retained WBC welterweight title
41	Win	39–1–1	Wilfredo Rivera	UD	12	Sep 20, 1996	James L. Knight Center, Miami, Florida, U.S.	Retained WBC welterweight title
40	Win	38–1–1	Wilfredo Rivera	SD	12	Apr 12, 1996	Atlantis World Casino, Sint Maarten, Netherlands Antilles	Retained WBC welterweight title
39	Win	37–1–1	Jake Rodríguez	KO	6 (12), 2:54	Nov 18, 1995	Convention Hall, Atlantic City, New Jersey, U.S.	Retained WBC welterweight title
38	Win	36–1–1	Gary Jacobs	UD	12	Aug 26, 1995	Convention Hall, Atlantic City, New Jersey, U.S.	Retained WBC welterweight title
37	Win	35–1–1	Julio César Vásquez	UD	12	Mar 4, 1995	Convention Hall, Atlantic City, New Jersey, U.S.	Won WBA super welterweight title
36	Win	34–1–1	James McGirt	UD	12	Oct 1, 1994	Scope, Norfolk, Virginia, U.S.	Retained WBC welterweight title
35	Win	33–1–1	Santos Cardona	UD	12	Apr 9, 1994	Scope, Norfolk, Virginia, U.S.	Retained WBC welterweight title
34	Draw	32–1–1	Julio César Chávez	MD	12	Sep 10, 1993	Alamodome, San Antonio, Texas, U.S.	Retained WBC welterweight title
33	Win	32–1	James McGirt	UD	12	Mar 6, 1993	Madison Square Garden, New York City, New York, U.S.	Won WBC welterweight title
32	Win	31–1	Ben Baez	KO	1 (10), 0:37	Dec 1, 1992	Convention Center, Virginia Beach, Virginia, U.S.	
31	Win	30–1	Rafael Pineda	UD	12	Jul 18, 1992	The Mirage, Paradise, Nevada, U.S.	Won IBF junior welterweight title
30	Win	29–1	Jerry Smith	KO	1 (10)	May 22, 1992	El Toreo de Cuatro Caminos, Mexico City, Mexico	
29	Win	28–1	Harold Brazier	UD	10	Jan 18, 1992	Pennsylvania Hall, Philadelphia, Pennsylvania, U.S.	
28	Win	27–1	Jorge Páez	UD	12	Oct 5, 1991	Convention Center, Reno, Nevada, U.S.	Retained WBA, WBC, and IBF lightweight titles
27	Win	26–1	Poli Díaz	UD	12	Jul 27, 1991	Scope, Norfolk, Virginia, U.S.	Retained WBA, WBC, and IBF lightweight titles
26	Win	25–1	Anthony Jones	UD	12	Feb 23, 1991	Caesars Palace, Paradise, Nevada, U.S.	Retained WBA, WBC, and IBF lightweight titles
25	Win	24–1	Benjie Marquez	UD	10	Nov 22, 1990	Palacio de Deportes de la Comunidad, Madrid, Spain	
24	Win	23–1	Juan Nazario	KO	1 (12), 2:59	Aug 11, 1990	Caesars Tahoe, Stateline, Nevada, U.S.	Retained WBC and IBF lightweight titles; Won WBA lightweight title
23	Win	22–1	Azumah Nelson	UD	12	May 19, 1990	Caesars Palace, Paradise, Nevada, U.S.	Retained WBC and IBF lightweight titles
22	Win	21–1	Freddie Pendleton	UD	12	Feb 3, 1990	Convention Hall, Atlantic City, New Jersey, U.S.	Retained WBC and IBF lightweight titles
21	Win	20–1	Martin Galvan	TKO	3 (?)	Dec 11, 1989	Les Pyramides, Le Port-Marly, France	
20	Win	19–1	José Luis Ramírez	UD	12	Aug 20, 1989	Scope, Norfolk, Virginia, U.S.	Retained IBF lightweight title; Won vacant WBC and The Ring lightweight titles
19	Win	18–1	Louie Lomeli	TKO	3 (12), 2:37	Apr 30, 1989	Scope, Norfolk, Virginia, U.S.	Retained IBF lightweight title
18	Win	17–1	Greg Haugen	UD	12	Feb 18, 1989	Coliseum, Hampton, Virginia, U.S.	Won IBF lightweight title
17	Win	16–1	Antonio Carter	TKO	4 (10), 2:37	Nov 2, 1988	Convention Center, Virginia Beach, Virginia, U.S.	
16	Loss	15–1	Jose Luis Ramírez	SD	12	Mar 12, 1988	Stade de Levallois, Levallois-Perret, France	For WBC lightweight title
15	Win	15–0	Davey Montana	TKO	4 (10), 2:14	Dec 19, 1987	Paris, France	
14	Win	14–0	Miguel Santana	TKO	6 (12), 1:02	Jul 25, 1987	Scope, Norfolk, Virginia, U.S.	Retained NABF lightweight title; Won vacant USBA lightweight title
13	Win	13–0	Jim Flores	TKO	1 (10)	Jun 28, 1987	Las Americas Arena, Houston, Texas, U.S.	
12	Win	12–0	Roger Mayweather	UD	12	Mar 28, 1987	Scope, Norfolk, Virginia, U.S.	Won vacant NABF lightweight title
11	Win	11–0	Alfredo Layne	UD	10	Dec 20, 1986	Scope, Norfolk, Virginia, U.S.	
10	Win	10–0	Rafael Gandarilla	UD	10	Oct 9, 1986	Felt Forum, New York City, New York, U.S.	
9	Win	9–0	Rafael Williams	UD	10	Aug 16, 1986	Sands, Atlantic City, New Jersey, U.S.	
8	Win	8–0	John Montes	UD	10	Mar 9, 1986	Coliseum, Hampton, Virginia, U.S.	
7	Win	7–0	Jesus De la Cruz	TKO	1 (8), 2:22	Nov 12, 1985	Country Connection, Pasadena, Texas, U.S.	
6	Win	6–0	Teddy Hatfield	KO	3 (8), 2:42	Aug 29, 1985	Omni Coliseum, Atlanta, Georgia, U.S.	
5	Win	5–0	John Senegal	TKO	2 (8), 1:29	Jul 20, 1985	Scope, Norfolk, Virginia, U.S.	
4	Win	4–0	Nick Parker	UD	6	Apr 20, 1985	Memorial Coliseum, Corpus Christi, Texas, U.S.	
3	Win	3–0	Mike Golden	TKO	4 (6), 2:54	Mar 13, 1985	Scope, Norfolk, Virginia, U.S.	
2	Win	2–0	Danny Avery	TKO	4 (6)	Jan 20, 1985	Broadway by the Bay Theater, Atlantic City, New Jersey, U.S.	
1	Win	1–0	Farrain Comeaux	TKO	2 (6), 2:50	Nov 15, 1984	Madison Square Garden, New York City, New York, U.S.	

== Titles in boxing ==
=== Major world titles ===
- WBA lightweight champion (135 lbs)
- WBC lightweight champion (135 lbs)
- IBF lightweight champion (135 lbs)
- IBF light welterweight champion (140 lbs)
- WBC welterweight champion (147 lbs)
- WBA light middleweight champion (154 lbs)

=== The Ring magazine titles ===
- The Ring lightweight champion (135 lbs)

=== Regional/International titles ===
- NABF lightweight champion (135 lbs)
- USBA lightweight champion (135 lbs)

=== Undisputed titles ===
- Undisputed lightweight champion (Note: First and only undisputed lightweight champion in the three-belt era.)

== Pay-per-view bouts ==
Date	Fight	Billing	Buys	Network
April 12, 1997	Whitaker vs. De La Hoya	Pound for Pound	720,000	HBO

== See also ==
- List of WBA world champions
- List of WBC world champions
- List of boxing quadruple champions
- List of left-handed boxers

== Notes and references ==
=== References ===
Sporting positions
Amateur boxing titles
Previous: Joe Manley	U.S. lightweight champion 1982	Next: Clifford Gray
Regional boxing titles
Vacant Title last held by Greg Haugen	NABF lightweight champion March 28, 1987 – October 1987; Vacated	Vacant Title next held by Primo Ramos
Vacant Title last held by Terrence Alli	USBA lightweight champion July 25, 1987 – September 1987; Vacated	Vacant Title next held by Freddie Pendleton
World boxing titles
Preceded by Greg Haugen	IBF lightweight champion February 18, 1989 – February 28, 1992; Vacated	Vacant Title next held by Freddie Pendleton
Vacant Title last held by Julio César Chávez	WBC lightweight champion August 20, 1989 – April 13, 1992; Vacated	Vacant Title next held by Miguel Ángel González
Vacant Title last held by Julio César Chávez	The Ring lightweight champion August 20, 1989; Title discontinued until 2002	Vacant Title next held by Floyd Mayweather Jr.
Preceded by Juan Nazario	WBA lightweight champion August 11, 1990 – April 20, 1992; Vacated	Vacant Title next held by Joey Gamache
Vacant Title last held by Roberto Durán	Undisputed lightweight champion August 11, 1990 – February 28, 1992; Titles fragmented	Vacant Title next held by Devin Haney
Preceded by Rafael Pineda	IBF junior welterweight champion July 18, 1992 – March 6, 1993; Vacated	Vacant Title next held by Charles Murray
Preceded by Buddy McGirt	WBC welterweight champion March 6, 1993 – April 12, 1997	Succeeded by Oscar De La Hoya
Preceded by Julio César Vásquez	WBA super welterweight champion March 4, 1995 – March 8, 1995; Vacated	Vacant Title next held by Carl Daniels
Awards
Previous: Julio César Chávez	The Ring pound for pound #1 boxer September 15, 1993 – April 18, 1996	Next: Roy Jones Jr.
