= Vinny Paz =

American boxer (born 1962)

- Paz in 1987

Personal information
- Nickname: The Pazmanian Devil
- Born: Vincenzo Edward Pazienza; December 16, 1962 (age 63) Cranston, Rhode Island, U.S.
- Height: 5 ft 7 1/2 in (1.71 m)
- Weight: Lightweight; Light welterweight; Light middleweight; Super middleweight

Boxing career
- Reach: 70 1/2 in (179 cm)
- Stance: Orthodox

Boxing record
- Total fights: 60
- Wins: 50
- Win by KO: 30
- Losses: 10

Vinny Paz (born Vincenzo Edward Pazienza, December 16, 1962), formerly Vinny Pazienza, is an American former professional boxer who competed from 1983 to 2004. He is a world champion in two weight classes, having held International Boxing Federation (IBF) lightweight 1987 to 1998, and World Boxing Association (WBA) light middleweight 1991 to 1992. The 2016 film Bleed for This is based on his comeback from a spinal injury. In 2022, he was inducted into the International Sports Hall of Fame. Paz was also inducted into the International Boxing Hall of Fame as part of the class of 2025.

== Professional career ==
In the 1980s, Pazienza built a reputation along the U.S. East Coast, defeating such opponents as Melvin Paul (KO 2), Joe Frazier Jr. (TKO 7), Harry Arroyo (UD 10), Nelson Bolanos (TKO 6), and Roberto Elizondo (KO in 10). His first world title fight came on June 7, 1987, in Providence, Rhode Island, where he outpointed Greg Haugen over 15 rounds to become the IBF world lightweight champion. The pair would meet two more times: Haugen recovering the title in an immediate rematch, and Pazienza prevailing in a 10-round decision in their rubber match in 1990.

Pazienza failed in title tries in the junior welterweight division: in 1988, against WBC World Champion Roger Mayweather and in 1990, against both WBO Champion Hector "Macho" Camacho and WBA World Champion Loreto Garza.

In 1991, Pazienza moved into the junior middleweight division. This movement was at the advice of his new trainer Kevin Rooney. In his first fight at junior middleweight, he won the USBA championship against Ron Amundsen in a 12-round decision. He defeated the WBA world jr. middleweight champion Gilbert Delé with a 12th-round TKO in Providence, becoming the second fighter in boxing history to win both the lightweight and junior middleweight world championships.

Pazienza was forced to relinquish the title due to a serious car accident in which his neck was broken. He was scheduled for a Jan.10 title defense against Pat Lawlor in Atlantic City but it was called off. Doctors informed him he might never walk again and would certainly never fight again. Pazienza had to wear a medical device called a Halo, a circular metal brace screwed into the skull in four spots and propped up with four metal rods. He had the Halo screwed to his skull for three months, during which time he maintained a workout regimen against doctors orders. He returned to the ring thirteen months after the accident and defeated future WBC world jr. middleweight champion Luis Santana by a 10-round decision.

After the Santana fight, Pazienza went on to defeat Brett Lally by a 6th-round TKO, and then, in another TKO, former world champion Lloyd Honeyghan in the 10th round. Pazienza went on to win the vacant IBO middleweight world title in 1993 with an 11th-round KO over Dan Sherry. Pazienza then went on to beat Roberto Durán twice, both via unanimous decision, with the IBC super middleweight title on the line both times. In the first fight, Durán put Pazienza down in Rounds 2 and 5, but referee Joe Cortez controversially ruled the Round 2 knockdown to be a slip. The first fight divided the people watching as some felt that Durán had won a close fight, but others felt that Pazienza had won either narrowly or widely after finishing strongly in the last five rounds. The second fight was more lopsided in Pazienza's favour, as despite the official judges giving Pazienza the win by scores of 116–112, 117–111 and 118–110, the TV commentators expressed puzzlement at the closeness of the official scoring as they thought that Pazienza had won every round in a 120–108 shutout.

In June 1995, Pazienza lost his world title bid against IBF world super middleweight champion Roy Jones Jr. In 1996, Pazienza inflicted then-prospect Dana Rosenblatt's only loss (a knockout in four rounds) to win the vacant WBU super middleweight world championship.

In early 2001, Pazienza legally changed his last name to Paz. In 2002, he lost to WBC world super middleweight champion Eric Lucas in what would be his last shot at a world title. In 2004, Paz fought in his last fight, defeating Tocker Pudwill via 10-round unanimous decision. His record stands at 50–10, with 30 wins by knockout and five world titles (the IBF lightweight championship, WBA jr. middleweight championship, IBO super middleweight championship, IBC super middleweight championship, and the WBU super middleweight championship). He also won the USBA title.

== Neck injury ==
On November 12, 1991, Pazienza was a passenger in a car that was involved in a head-on collision in Warwick, Rhode Island, at an estimated speed of 40 miles per hour (64 km/h), as a result of which he suffered a dislocated vertebra and two fractured vertebrae in his neck. The driver of his car suffered a head injury and the driver of the oncoming car suffered minor injuries. Pazienza sued both drivers and was awarded $926,000, after the District Court for the District of Rhode Island ruled that the driver of the car in which Pazienza was a passenger was solely responsible for causing the accident.

== Television/film appearances ==
Outside of boxing, Paz was a guest star on the TV series Police Academy, a guest on The Tonight Show with Jay Leno, was featured on The Montell Williams Show, served as a guest security guard on an episode of The Jerry Springer Show, and refereed the Brawl for All fight at WrestleMania XV between Bart Gunn and Butterbean. He appeared in the unreleased 1997 movie The Good Life. He appears in comedian Ray Harrington's 2015 documentary Be a Man.

The 2016 film Bleed for This is based on his comeback from a spinal injury, and stars Miles Teller as Pazienza.

== Legal issues ==
Paz has been arrested on a variety of criminal charges, including alcohol-related crimes, domestic violence, passing bad checks, and disorderly conduct.

== Professional boxing record ==
60 fights	50 wins	10 losses
By knockout	30	3
By decision	20	6
By disqualification	0	1

No.	Result	Record	Opponent	Type	Round, time	Date	Location	Notes
60	Win	50–10	Tocker Pudwill	UD	10	Mar 27, 2004	Foxwoods, Mashantucket, Connecticut, U.S.	
59	Loss	49–10	Eric Lucas	UD	12	Mar 1, 2002	Foxwoods, Mashantucket, Connecticut, U.S.	For WBC super-middleweight title
58	Win	49–9	Levan Easley	UD	10	Dec 7, 2001	Foxwoods, Mashantucket, Connecticut, U.S.	
57	Win	48–9	Tim Shocks	UD	10	Sep 21, 2001	Rhodes-on-the Pawtuxet, Cranston, Rhode Island, U.S.	
56	Win	47–9	Pat Lawlor	KO	2 (10), 1:52	Jul 27, 2001	Rhodes-on-the Pawtuxet, Cranston, Rhode Island, U.S.	
55	Loss	46–9	Aaron Davis	TKO	8 (10), 1:48	Feb 9, 2001	Foxwoods, Mashantucket, Connecticut, U.S.	
54	Loss	46–8	Dana Rosenblatt	SD	12	Nov 5, 1999	Foxwoods, Mashantucket, Connecticut, U.S.	For vacant IBO super-middleweight title
53	Win	46–7	Esteban Cervantes	SD	10	Jun 25, 1999	Foxwoods, Mashantucket, Connecticut, U.S.	
52	Win	45–7	Joseph Kiwanuka	UD	10	Apr 9, 1999	Foxwoods, Mashantucket, Connecticut, U.S.	
51	Win	44–7	Undra White	TKO	9 (10), 2:55	Jan 8, 1999	Foxwoods, Mashantucket, Connecticut, U.S.	
50	Win	43–7	Arthur Allen	UD	10	Nov 6, 1998	Foxwoods, Mashantucket, Connecticut, U.S.	
49	Win	42–7	Glenwood Brown	MD	10	Jul 26, 1998	Foxwoods, Mashantucket, Connecticut, U.S.	
48	Loss	41–7	Herol Graham	UD	12	Dec 6, 1997	Wembley Arena, Wembley, London, England	For WBC International super-middleweight title
47	Win	41–6	Dana Rosenblatt	TKO	4 (12), 2:13	Aug 23, 1996	Bally's Atlantic City, Atlantic City, New Jersey, U.S.	Won vacant WBU super-middleweight title
46	Loss	40–6	Roy Jones Jr.	TKO	6 (12), 2:58	Jun 24, 1995	Atlantic City Convention Center, Atlantic City, New Jersey, U.S.	For IBF super-middleweight title
45	Win	40–5	Roberto Durán	UD	12	Jan 14, 1995	Boardwalk Hall, Atlantic City, New Jersey, U.S.	Retained IBC super-middleweight title
44	Win	39–5	Rafael Williams	UD	10	Nov 8, 1994	Foxwoods, Mashantucket, Connecticut, U.S.	
43	Win	38–5	Roberto Durán	UD	12	Jun 25, 1994	MGM Grand Garden Arena, Las Vegas, Nevada, U.S.	Won vacant IBC super-middleweight title
42	Win	37–5	Jacques LeBlanc	UD	10	Apr 5, 1994	Foxwoods, Mashantucket, Connecticut, U.S.	
41	Win	36–5	Dan Sherry	KO	11 (15), 2:59	Dec 28, 1993	Ritz Carlton, Aspen, Colorado, U.S.	Won vacant IBO super-middleweight title
40	Win	35–5	Robbie Sims	UD	10	Oct 26, 1993	Foxwoods, Mashantucket, Connecticut, U.S.	
39	Win	34–5	Lloyd Honeyghan	TKO	10 (12), 0:56	Jun 26, 1993	Atlantic City Convention Center, Atlantic City, New Jersey, U.S.	
38	Win	33–5	Brett Lally	RTD	6 (10), 3:00	Mar 2, 1993	Foxwoods, Mashantucket, Connecticut, U.S.	
37	Win	32–5	Luis Santana	UD	10	Dec 15, 1992	Foxwoods, Mashantucket, Connecticut, U.S.	
36	Win	31–5	Gilbert Delé	TKO	12 (12), 2:10	Oct 1, 1991	Providence Civic Center, Providence, Rhode Island, U.S.	Won WBA light-middleweight title
35	Win	30–5	Ron Amundsen	UD	12	Jul 2, 1991	Providence, Rhode Island, U.S.	Won IBF–USBA light-middleweight title
34	Loss	29–5	Loreto Garza	DQ	11 (12), 2:59	Dec 1, 1990	Arco Arena, Sacramento, California, U.S.	For WBA light-welterweight title
33	Win	29–4	Greg Haugen	UD	10	Aug 5, 1990	Trump Plaza Hotel and Casino, Atlantic City, New Jersey, U.S.	
32	Loss	28–4	Hector Camacho	UD	12	Feb 3, 1990	Boardwalk Hall, Atlantic City, New Jersey, U.S.	For WBO light-welterweight title
31	Win	28–3	Eddie VanKirk	TKO	5 (10), 2:41	Nov 27, 1989	Providence Civic Center, Providence, Rhode Island, U.S.	
30	Win	27–3	Vinnie Burgese	TKO	10 (10), 1:05	Jun 11, 1989	Trump Plaza Hotel and Casino, Atlantic City, New Jersey, U.S.	
29	Win	26–3	Jake Carollo	TKO	2 (10), 1:58	Apr 14, 1989	Trump Plaza Hotel and Casino, Atlantic City, New Jersey, U.S.	
28	Loss	25–3	Roger Mayweather	UD	12	Nov 7, 1988	Caesars Palace, Las Vegas, Nevada, U.S.	For WBC light-welterweight title
27	Win	25–2	Rick Kaiser	TKO	3 (10), 1:24	Oct 4, 1988	Park West, Chicago, Illinois, U.S.	
26	Win	24–2	Felix Dubray	TKO	4 (10), 1:34	Jun 27, 1988	Providence Civic Center, Providence, Rhode Island, U.S.	
25	Loss	23–2	Greg Haugen	UD	15	Feb 6, 1988	Atlantic City Convention Center, Atlantic City, New Jersey, U.S.	Lost IBF lightweight title
24	Win	23–1	Greg Haugen	UD	15	Jun 7, 1987	Providence Civic Center, Providence, Rhode Island, U.S.	Won IBF lightweight title
23	Win	22–1	Roberto Elizondo	TKO	10 (10), 2:56	Feb 8, 1987	Providence Civic Center, Providence, Rhode Island, U.S.	
22	Win	21–1	Roger Brown	TKO	4 (10), 2:53	Nov 8, 1986	San Juan, Puerto Rico	
21	Win	20–1	Nelson Bolanos	TKO	6 (12), 2:48	Sep 18, 1986	Providence Civic Center, Providence, Rhode Island, U.S.	
20	Win	19–1	Harry Arroyo	UD	10	May 18, 1986	Providence, Rhode Island, U.S.	
19	Win	18–1	Joe Frazier Jr.	TKO	7 (10), 1:52	Feb 5, 1986	Providence, Rhode Island, U.S.	
18	Win	17–1	Melvin Paul	TKO	2 (10)	Nov 26, 1985	Atlantic City, New Jersey, U.S.	
17	Win	16–1	Jeff Bumpus	UD	10	Sep 18, 1985	Harrah's Atlantic City, Atlantic City, New Jersey, U.S.	
16	Win	15–1	Antoine Lark	TKO	6 (8), 2:46	Mar 27, 1985	Harrah's Atlantic City, Atlantic City, New Jersey, U.S.	
15	Loss	14–1	Abdelkader Marbi	TKO	5 (8)	Dec 1, 1984	Palazzo Dello Sport, Milan, Italy	
14	Win	14–0	Bruno Simili	TKO	3 (8)	Nov 17, 1984	Riva del Garda, Italy	
13	Win	13–0	Rich McCain	UD	8	Aug 29, 1984	Sands Atlantic City, Atlantic City, New Jersey, U.S.	
12	Win	12–0	Mike Golden	PTS	8	Apr 15, 1984	Sands Atlantic City, Atlantic City, New Jersey, U.S.	
11	Win	11–0	David Bell	TKO	4 (8)	Feb 26, 1984	Beaumont Civic Center, Beaumont, Texas, U.S.	
10	Win	10–0	Jose Ortiz	KO	6 (8), 2:37	Dec 14, 1983	Ice World, Totowa, New Jersey, U.S.	
9	Win	9–0	Emilio Diaz	TKO	3 (?)	Dec 2, 1983	Warwick, Rhode Island, U.S.	
8	Win	8–0	Robert Stevenson	KO	1 (6), 1:45	Oct 27, 1983	Atlantic City, New Jersey, U.S.	
7	Win	7–0	Jim Zelinski	TKO	2 (6)	Sep 24, 1983	Ice World, Totowa, New Jersey, U.S.	
6	Win	6–0	Ricardo Moreno	TKO	3 (6), 2:42	Sep 9, 1983	Caesars Palace, Las Vegas, Nevada, U.S.	
5	Win	5–0	Rafael Alicia	TKO	2 (4), 2:30	Aug 31, 1983	Sands Atlantic City, Atlantic City, New Jersey, U.S.	
4	Win	4–0	Eddie Carberry	TKO	2 (4)	Aug 16, 1983	Playboy Hotel and Casino, Atlantic City, New Jersey, U.S.	
3	Win	3–0	Patrick Dangerfield Jr.	KO	2 (4)	Jul 10, 1983	Caesars Atlantic City, Atlantic City, New Jersey, U.S.	
2	Win	2–0	Keith McCoy	KO	3 (4)	Jun 30, 1983	Atlantic City, New Jersey, U.S.	
1	Win	1–0	Alfredo Rivera	TKO	4 (4)	May 26, 1983	Sands Atlantic City, Atlantic City, New Jersey, U.S.	

== Titles in boxing ==
=== Major world titles ===
- IBF lightweight champion (135 lbs)
- WBA light-middleweight champion (154 lbs)

=== Minor world titles ===
- IBO super-middleweight champion (168 lbs)
- IBC super-middleweight champion (168 lbs)
- WBU super-middleweight champion (168 lbs)

=== Regional/International titles ===
- IBF–USBA light-middleweight champion (154 lbs)

== Bibliography ==
- Caduto, Tommy Jon (2009). Fight Or Die: The Vinny Paz Story. Guilford, Connecticut: Globe Pequot Press. ISBN 978-1-59921-556-3.

Sporting positions
Regional boxing titles
Preceded by Ron Amundsen	USBA light middleweight champion July 2, 1991 – October 1, 1991; Vacated	Vacant Title next held by Vincent Pettway
World boxing titles
Preceded by Greg Haugen	IBF lightweight champion June 7, 1987 – February 6, 1988	Succeeded by Greg Haugen
Preceded by Gilbert Delé	WBA light middleweight champion October 1, 1991 – October 14, 1992; Vacated	Vacant Title next held by Julio César Vásquez
Awards
Previous: Tony Lopez	The Ring Magazine Comeback of the Year; 1991	Next: Iran Barkley
