= Buddy McGirt vs. Pernell Whitaker =

Boxing match

Pound for Pound: Who's Number One?
- Date: March 6, 1993
- Venue: Madison Square Garden, New York City, New York, U.S.
- Title(s) on the line: WBC welterweight title

Tale of the tape
Boxer	James McGirt	Pernell Whitaker
Nickname	Buddy	Sweet Pea
Hometown	Brentwood, New York, U.S.	Norfolk, Virginia, U.S.
Purse	$1,000,000	$1,250,000
Pre-fight record	59–2–1 (44 KO)	31–1 (15 KO)
Age	29 years, 1 month	29 years, 2 months
Height	5 ft 6 1/2 in (169 cm)	5 ft 6 in (168 cm)
Weight	147 lb (67 kg)	146 1/4 lb (66 kg)
Style	Orthodox	Southpaw
Recognition	WBC; Welterweight Champion; The Ring; No. 1 Ranked Welterweight; The Ring No. 5 ranked pound-for-pound fighter 2-division world champion	IBF; Light Welterweight Champion; The Ring; No. 2 Ranked Light Welterweight; The Ring No. 2 ranked pound-for-pound fighter 2-division world champion

Result
- Whitaker wins via 12-round unanimous decision (117-111, 115-114, 115-113)

Buddy McGirt vs. Pernell Whitaker, billed as Pound for Pound: Who's Number One?, was a professional boxing match contested on March 6, 1993, for the WBC welterweight title.

== Background ==
A match between reigning WBC welterweight champion James "Buddy" McGirt and reigning IBF light welterweight champion Pernell Whitaker was made official for March 6, 1993, after McGirt's victory over Genaro Léon in January. McGirt had suffered a left shoulder injury prior to his fight Léon, forcing him to win the fight virtually one-handed. McGirt decided to continue with his title defense despite the injury, claiming that "it's not an injury, it's just tendinitis." and that he was going into the fight against Whitaker at "95 percent."

Both McGirt and Whitaker were considered among the best pound-for-pound fighters in boxing (along with the then-WBC light welterweight champion Julio César Chávez and then-WBC light middleweight champion Terry Norris). The winner of the fight was expected to be recognized as the number-one pound-for-pound fighter in the sport.

Whitaker entered the fight as a 12-to-5 favorite, and both fighters were set for a 7-figure payday. McGirt's purse was $1 million while Whitaker's was $1.25 million.

== The fight ==
The fight lasted the full 12 rounds with Whitaker ultimately earning a close but unanimous decision. The fight started off close but Whitaker took control in the middle rounds as McGirt struggled with his left shoulder injury, basically fighting one-handed as he had his previous fight. Whitaker would out-land McGirt in punches, landing 314 of 768 punches for a 41% success rate, while McGirt landed 238 of 717 for a 33% rate. One judge had Whitaker comfortably ahead with a score of 117–111, while the other two judges scored the fight close with Whitaker narrowly winning by scores of 115–114 and 115–113. Whitaker would describe the victory as "easy" while McGirt when asked of the loss, simply stated "My arm went. What can I say?"

== Aftermath ==
Unbeknownst to Whitaker, a deal had already been made prior to his fight with McGirt between his promoter Dan Duva and Julio César Chávez's promoter Don King that would see Chávez challenge for Whitaker's newly won title. Dan's father and Whitaker's trainer and manager Lou Duva had not told Whitaker of the Chávez bout until after his fight with McGirt because he "didn't want to take away his focus."

McGirt was discovered to have a torn rotator cuff after the fight and would undergo surgery to repair the tear days later. After returning to boxing in November and going 5–0 in his subsequent five fights, a rematch with Whitaker was agreed to in August 1994 and took place later in the year in October.

== Fight card ==
Confirmed bouts:

Weight Class	Weight		vs.		Method	Round	Notes
Welterweight	147 lb	Pernell Whitaker	def.	James McGirt (c)	UD	12/12	^{Note 1}
Bantamweight	118 lb	Junior Jones	def.	Juan Pablo Salazar	KO	4/12	^{Note 2}
Welterweight	147 lb	Larry Barnes	def.	Clarence Coleman	UD	10/10
Super Middleweight	168 lb	Joe Gatti	def.	Oscar Noriega	TKO	2/8
Light Heavyweight	175 lb	Lou Del Valle	def.	Daren Zenner	UD	6/6
Super Middleweight	168 lb	Lonnie Bradley	def.	Ken Wallace	MD	4/4

^Note 1 For WBC and lineal welterweight titles
^Note 2 For vacant WBC Continental Americas Bantamweight title

== Broadcasting ==
Country	Broadcaster
United States	HBO

Preceded by vs. Genaro Leon	Buddy McGirt's bouts 6 March 1993	Succeeded by vs. Nick Rupa
Preceded by vs. Ben Baez	Pernell Whitaker's bouts 6 March 1993	Succeeded by vs. Julio César Chávez
