= Poli Díaz =

Spanish boxer (born 1967)

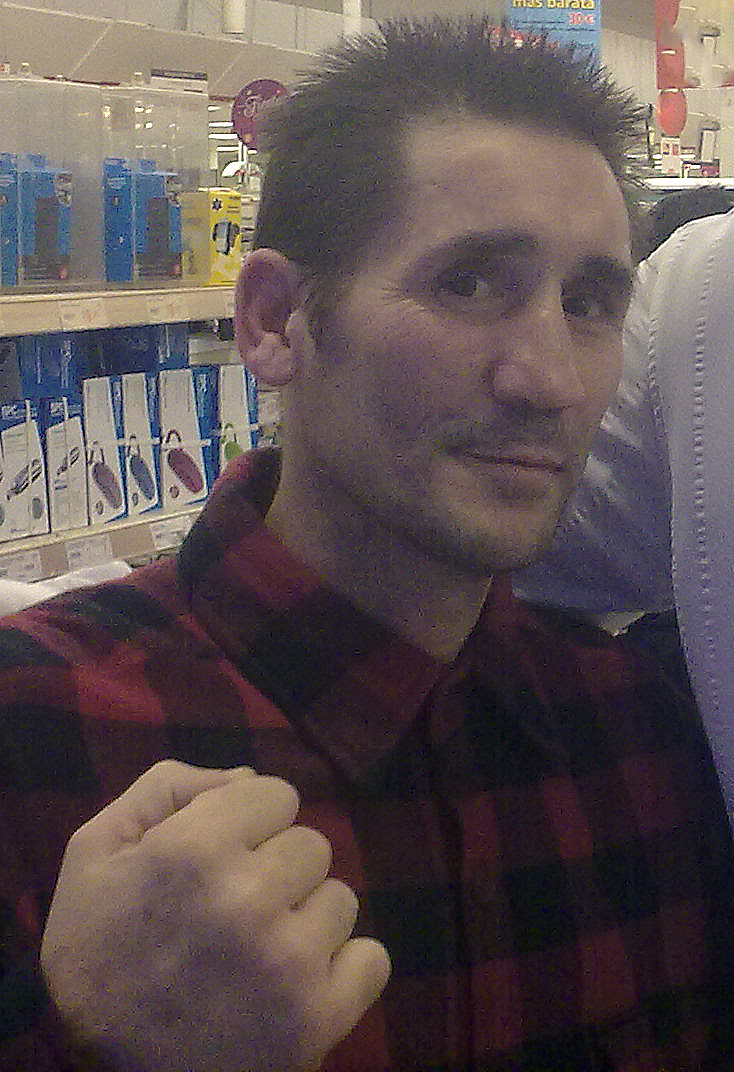

Personal information
- Nickname: El potro de Vallecas
- Nationality: Spanish
- Born: Policarpo Díaz Arévalo; November 21, 1967 (age 58) Vallecas, Madrid, Spain
- Height: 5 ft 6.5 in (1.69 m)
- Weight: Lightweight

Boxing career

Boxing record
- Total fights: 47
- Wins: 44
- Win by KO: 28
- Losses: 3

Policarpo "Poli" Díaz Arevalo (born November 21, 1967) is a Spanish former professional boxer who competed from 1986 to 2001. He held the European lightweight title from 1988 to 1991, and challenged for the undisputed lightweight world title in 1991.

In July 1991, he fought for the undisputed lightweight championship of the world against Pernell Whitaker, but he was defeated by decision after 12 rounds. Before this fight, Diaz had 32 wins and 0 losses, and 28 KO's after being eight times European champion.
