= Pernell Whitaker vs. Julio César Chávez =

Boxing match

The Fight
- Date: September 10, 1993
- Venue: Alamodome, San Antonio, Texas, U.S.
- Title(s) on the line: WBC welterweight title

Tale of the tape
Boxer	Pernell Whitaker	Julio César Chávez
Nickname	Sweet Pea	El Gran Campeón Mexicano ("The Great Mexican Champion")
Hometown	Norfolk, Virginia, U.S.	Culiacán, Sinaloa, Mexico
Purse	$3,000,000	$5,000,000
Pre-fight record	32–1 (15 KO)	87–0 (75 KO)
Age	29 years, 8 months	31 years, 1 month
Height	5 ft 5 1/2 in (166 cm)	5 ft 7 1/2 in (171 cm)
Weight	145 lb (66 kg)	142 lb (64 kg)
Style	Southpaw	Orthodox
Recognition	WBC; Welterweight Champion; The Ring; No. 1 Ranked Welterweight; The Ring No. 2 ranked pound-for-pound fighter 4-division world champion	WBC; Super Lightweight Champion; The Ring; No. 1 Ranked Light Welterweight; The Ring No. 1 ranked pound-for-pound fighter 3-division world champion

Result
- 12-round majority draw (115–113, 115–115, 115–115)

Pernell Whitaker vs. Julio César Chávez, billed as The Fight, was a professional boxing match contested on September 10, 1993, for the WBC welterweight title.

== Background ==
Immediately following Pernell Whitaker's victory over Buddy McGirt on March 6, 1993, it was announced that a deal had been reached that would see Whitaker face reigning WBC light welterweight champion Julio César Chávez. The deal had been made prior to the McGirt–Whitaker bout and was to have happened regardless if Whitaker won or lost. Had Whitaker lost, his fight against Chávez would have been a unification bout for Whitaker's IBF light welterweight title and Chávez's WBC light welterweight title, but Whitaker's victory ensure the fight would instead be for his newly won WBC welterweight title instead. At the insistence of Chávez, the fight was held at a catch-weight of 145 pounds, two pounds under the official welterweight limit of 147 pounds.

The fight was highly anticipated as Chávez was the number one fighter on The Ring magazine's pound-for-pound list and Whitaker was number two. It was the first time in the history of The Ring magazine's pound-for-pound list that the two top ranked fighters on the pound-for-pound list had faced each other. When asked about becoming the number one fighter in the pound-for-pound rankings Whitaker stated "That is the title every man dreams of. This fight is the World Series, Super Bowl, NBA finals. It's boxing's two best fighters."

== The fight ==
In one of the most disputed decisions in boxing history, the fight was declared a majority draw. Whitaker used his slick boxing skills to control the fight as Chávez had trouble landing punches consistently. Whitaker would dominate with his jab landing 130 to Chávez's face, and had the edge in overall punches with 311 punches landed compared to 220 for Chávez. However, when the fight went to the judge's scorecards only one judge, Jack Woodruff, had scored the fight in Whitaker's favor at 115–113. The other two judges, Mickey Vann and Franz Marti, would score the fight even at 115–115.

=== Unofficial scorecards ===
Virtually every scorecard from the press had Whitaker as the clear winner

- Associated Press: 116–112
- Newsday: 116–112
- The Ring Magazine: 117–111
- Sports Illustrated: 117–111
- Washington Post: 115–113

== Controversy and aftermath ==
There was immediate outrage over the result with many publications feeling that Whitaker had been robbed of a victory. Most notably, the September 20, 1993 issue of Sports Illustrated featured Whitaker on the cover with the headline "ROBBED!." Virtually all of the blame was heaped on the two WBC appointed judges Mickey Vann of England and Franz Marti of Switzerland whom were accused of being selected by Chávez's promoter Don King and WBC president (and Chávez's countryman) José Sulaimán solely to protect Chávez. The selection of lone American judge who had scored the fight in favor of Whitaker Jack Woodruff had been protested by Sulaimán, King and Chávez but they eventually relented. Said Whitaker's manager and trainer Lou Duva of the judges, "Vann and Marti are W.B.C. officials. These guys get trips all over the world; they're beholden to Sulaiman and King. They wanted the American judge knocked out of there. Why? This decision speaks for itself." Duva also lamented "This is the second time this has happened to one of our fighters with Chávez." referring to Meldrick Taylor's loss to Chávez three years prior. Duva had recommended respected veteran judge Jerry Roth, but Chávez refused. Duva's opinion was that Roth was turned down" because he had Meldrick Taylor ahead when Taylor fought Chávez."

Dan Duva would launch an official protest only four days after the fight in hopes of getting the decision overturned in favor of Whitaker. The protest concerned the scoring of the sixth round of the bout in which referee Joe Cortez briefly halted the fight to allow Chávez to recover after Whitaker landed a low-blow. As Cortez believed the blow was unintentional, he did not instruct the judges to deduct a point from Whitaker on the scorecards. Whitaker would win the round 10–9 on both Woodruff and Marti's scorecard but Vann scored the round 10–9 in Chávez's favor. Vann was quoted in the Daily Express stating "The referee didn't take off a point, but I thought it had to be done.", which would be a violation as boxing rules state that only a referee can deduct points during the fight. However, in an interview with ESPN's Charley Steiner, Vann denied any wrongdoing and stated that he scored the fight correctly. The following month, the protest was withdrawn.

== Fight card ==
Confirmed bouts:

Weight Class	Weight		vs.		Method	Round	Notes
Catchweight	145 lb	Pernell Whitaker (c)	vs.	Julio César Chávez	D	12/12	^{Note 1}
Super Featherweight	130 lb	Azumah Nelson (c)	vs.	Jesse James Leija	D	12/12	^{Note 2}
Light Middleweight	154 lb	Terry Norris (c)	def.	Joe Gatti	TKO	1/12	^{Note 3}
Middleweight	160 lb	Thomas Tate	def.	Eduardo Ayala	UD	10/10
Lightweight	135 lb	Leavander Johnson	def.	Bobby Brewer	TKO	10/10
Light Heavyweight	175 lb	Frank Tate	def.	Everardo Armenta Jr	TKO	9/10
Bantamweight	118 lb	Tim Austin	def.	Hector Lara	TKO	1/4

^Note 1 For WBC and Lineal Welterweight titles
^Note 2 For WBC Super Featherweight title
^Note 3 For WBC Light Middleweight title

== Broadcasting ==
Country	Broadcaster
United States	Showtime

Preceded by vs. Buddy McGirt	Pernell Whitaker's bouts 10 September 1993	Succeeded by vs. Santos Cardona
Preceded by vs. Terrence Alli	Julio César Chávez's bouts 10 September 1993	Succeeded by vs. Mike Powell
