= Dana Rosenblatt =

American boxer (born 1972)

"Dangerous" Dana Rosenblatt (born January 26, 1972, in Malden, Massachusetts) is a retired southpaw professional boxer who held a variety of minor boxing titles.

Rosenblatt began practicing martial arts at age 13 and earned a black belt in Tang Soo Do when he was 16. He also took up Judo when he was 16, and earned a brown belt.

He began competing as an amateur kickboxer at age 15, and won the U.S. amateur middleweight title.

Rosenblatt attended Malden Catholic High School, and later, Bunker Hill Community College, where he was an honors graduate.

== Boxing career ==
Rosenblatt became a professional boxer in 1992, at the age of 20. He made $500 for his first fight, which was in Pikesville, Maryland.

During his career he beat former U.S. Olympian Howard Davis Jr. and former junior middleweight champion Terry Norris.

On December 16, 1993, he defeated Sean Fitzgerald with a KO in the first round to win the New England middleweight title. He defeated Frank Savannah by TKO to win the World Boxing Council Continental Americas middleweight title. In 1995, he defeated Chad Parker with a KO in the first round to win the WBC Continental Americas Middleweight Title.

His only professional loss came when 2-time former champion Vinny Pazienza knocked him out in the 4th round during a 1996 fight. Following the bout Pazienza was fined $5,000 and suspended for 90 days by New Jersey boxing commissioner Larry Hazzard for punching referee Tony Orlando who had stepped in to stop the fight.

Rosenblatt later beat Pazienza in the 1999 rematch in a split decision, winning the vacant International Boxing Organization Super Middleweight Title.

Rosenblatt broke his hand in his victory over Glenwood Brown in January 1997 and needed over a year to recover.

On September 25, 1998, he defeated former 3-time WBC super welterweight champion "Terrible" Terry Norris in a unanimous 12-round decision, to capture the International Boxing Association World Middleweight Title.

He defeated Will "Kid Fire" McIntyre, 36–4–1, in October 2000. Several injuries, including a torn right shoulder rotator cuff, a separated left shoulder and torn labrum, and a hand fracture, led to a 20-month hiatus. His next fight was also his last: in a technical draw against Juan Carlos Viloria on June 28, 2002, Rosenblatt was again injured. He announced his retirement in August 2003 with a record of 37–1–2 (23).

== Career after boxing ==
Rosenblatt began a career as a mortgage broker after his retirement from boxing.

== See also ==
- List of select Jewish boxers
