= Gary Jacobs (boxer) =

Scottish boxer

Personal information
- Nickname: The Kid
- Nationality: British
- Born: Gary Jacobs; 10 December 1965 (age 60) Glasgow, Scotland, U.K.
- Height: 5 ft 7 in (170 cm)
- Weight: Middleweight; Welterweight

Boxing career
- Stance: Southpaw

Boxing record
- Total fights: 53
- Wins: 45
- Win by KO: 26
- Losses: 8

Gary Jacobs (born 10 December 1965) is a former professional Scottish boxer. Jacobs is now a professional boxing coach.

== Professional career ==
Jacobs at various points in his career held the British, Commonwealth, and European (EBU) welterweight titles, as well as unsuccessfully challenging Pernell Whitaker for his WBC crown. Jacobs wore a Star of David on his trunks.

== Post career ==
He was inducted into the Scottish Boxing Hall of Fame in 2011 and the International Jewish Sports Hall of Fame in 2025.

== Personal life ==
Jacobs is now a professional boxing coach at the MTK Scotland Gym and lives in the suburbs of Glasgow with his wife and three children

== Professional boxing record ==
53 fights	45 wins	8 losses
By knockout	26	2
By decision	19	6

== See also ==
- Pernell Whitaker vs. Gary Jacobs
- List of British welterweight boxing champions
- List of select Jewish boxers

Achievements
Preceded by Wilf Gentzen	Commonwealth Welterweight Champion; 19 April 1988 – 23 November 1989	Succeeded by Donovan Boucher
Preceded by Del Bryan	British Welterweight Champion; 20 February 1992 - 9 July 1992; Vacated	Vacant Title next held by Del Bryan
