= Dorin Spivey =

American boxer

"Dangerous" Dorin Spivey is an American boxer from Portsmouth, Virginia. His record is 50-6, with 33 wins coming by TKO. Spivey never fought as an amateur and turned pro in 1993. Spivey has held four boxing titles: 140 tri-state, 130 and 140 NBA World and currently the NABA lightweight title. On November 6, 2009, in Buffalo, New York he defeated Bahamian boxer Meacher Major for the NABA Lightweight Championship by KO in the fourth round. On April 3, 2010, he defended his title against Tyrell Samuel and defeated Samuel via decision.
