= Julio César Vásquez =

Argentine boxer

Personal information
- Nickname: El Zurdo
- Born: 13 July 1966 (age 60) Santa Fe, Argentina
- Height: 5 ft 8 in (173 cm)
- Weight: Light middleweight; Middleweight; Super middleweight

Boxing career
- Reach: 69 in (175 cm)
- Stance: Southpaw

Boxing record
- Total fights: 82
- Wins: 68
- Win by KO: 43
- Losses: 13
- Draws: 1

Julio César Vásquez (born July 13, 1965) is an Argentine retired professional boxer best known to have held a WBA junior middleweight title.

== Amateur record ==
Vasquez had an amateur record of 33-2.

== Professional career ==
Vasquez, known as "El Zurdo" which means lefty as he is a southpaw, turned pro in 1986 and captured the Vacant WBA Light Middleweight Title by KO'ing little-known Hitoshi Kamiyama in 1992. He successfully defended the title ten times beating such boxers as Javier Castillejo, Aaron Davis, Tony Marshall and the then-undefeated future-great: Winky Wright during his championship reign before losing the belt to the legendary Pernell Whitaker in 1995 who had only one fight in this weightclass.

That same year he recaptured the WBA Light Middleweight Title by beating fellow southpaw Carl Daniels whom he knocked out with a single straight left after trailing badly on points. The devastating 11th-round knockout of Daniels was named Ring Magazine Knockout of the Year for 1995.

He lost the belt in his next fight to Laurent Boudouani by KO and never contended again. Although he never had another major title shot, Vasquez continues to fight in his native Argentina, fighting as recently as 2007 in the super middleweight (168lb) division and has a current win–loss record of 68 wins, 13 losses.

== Professional boxing record ==
82 fights	68 wins	13 losses
By knockout	43	6
By decision	23	6
By disqualification	2	1
Draws	1	

No.	Result	Record	Opponent	Type	Round, time	Date	Location	Notes
82	Draw	68–13–1	Silvio Walter Rojas	PTS	4	2009-06-19	Club Atlético Sarmiento, Barrio Santa Marta, Argentina	
81	Loss	68–13	Oscar Daniel Veliz	KO	7 (8)	2008-04-11	Puerto Madryn, Argentina	
80	Loss	68–12	Ruben Eduardo Acosta	KO	1 (12)	2008-02-02	Estadio Polideportivo, Mar del Plata, Argentina	
79	Loss	68–11	Jorge Osvaldo Dominguez	UD	12 (12)	2007-04-21	Estadio Luna Park, Buenos Aires, Argentina	For vacant WBO Latino Middleweight title.
78	Win	68–10	Luis Ariel Rojas	KO	1 (8)	2007-02-21	Estadio Socios Fundadores, Comodoro Rivadavia, Argentina	
77	Loss	67–10	Martin Abel Bruer	RTD	9 (10)	2006-10-07	Club Barrio Alegre, Trenque Lauquen, Argentina	For Argentina (FAB) super middleweight title.
76	Win	67–9	Juan Carlos Villagra	UD	12 (12)	2006-05-12	Club Universitario, Bahia Blanca, Argentina	
75	Win	66–9	Hugo Daniel Sclarandi	UD	10 (10)	2006-02-17	Bahia Blanca, Argentina	
74	Loss	65–9	Stjepan Božić	RTD	7 (12)	2005-12-02	Dvorana Jazine, Zadar, Croatia	For WBF Super Middleweight title.
73	Win	65–8	Juan Carlos Villagra	UD	8 (8)	2005-03-12	Ce.De.M. N° 2, Caseros, Argentina	
72	Loss	64–8	Denis Inkin	TKO	7 (10)	2004-09-24	Ice Palace, Novosibirsk, Russia	
71	Loss	64–7	Alexey Chirkov	UD	10 (10)	2004-01-30	DIVS, Ekaterinburg, Russia	
70	Loss	64–6	Ramon Arturo Britez	UD	10 (10)	2003-01-24	Estadio Polideportivo, Mar del Plata, Argentina	
69	Win	64–5	Enrique Campos	UD	10 (10)	2002-11-30	Radisson Victoria Plaza, Montevideo, Uruguay	
68	Loss	63–5	Jorge Sclarandi	UD	10 (10)	2002-11-09	Estadio F.A.B., Buenos Aires, Argentina	
67	Loss	63–4	Robin Reid	UD	12 (12)	2001-12-19	Skydome, Coventry, England, U.K.	For WBF Super Middleweight title.
66	Win	63–3	Juan Italo Meza	TKO	9 (10)	2000-04-08	Estadio Parque Central, Neuquen, Argentina	
65	Win	62–3	Ricardo Raul Nunez	KO	2 (10)	2000-03-25	Club Atletico Quilmes, Mar del Plata, Argentina	
64	Win	61–3	Jorge Sclarandi	SD	10 (10)	2000-02-19	Club Atletico Quilmes, Mar del Plata, Argentina	
63	Win	60–3	Raul Omar Sena	UD	8 (8)	1998-02-21	Estadio Polideportivo, Mar del Plata, Argentina	
62	Win	59–3	Anthony Ivory	UD	8 (8)	1997-10-04	Le Grande Dome, Villebon, France	
61	Win	58–3	Hugo Daniel Sclarandi	UD	10 (10)	1997-07-19	Villa Gesell, Argentina	
60	Win	57–3	Ramon Arturo Britez	KO	1 (10)	1997-06-14	Buenos Aires, Argentina	
59	Loss	56–3	Laurent Boudouani	KO	5 (12)	1996-08-21	La Palestre, Le Cannet, France	Lost WBA Light Middleweight title
58	Win	56–2	Carl Daniels	TKO	11 (12)	1995-12-16	Core States Spectrum, Philadelphia, Pennsylvania, U.S.	Won WBA Light Middleweight title
57	Win	55–2	Carlos Martin Leturia	KO	1 (10)	1995-08-19	Buenos Aires, Argentina	
56	Win	54–2	Ruben Ruiz	TKO	1 (8)	1995-05-27	Broward County Convention Center, Fort Lauderdale, Florida, U.S.	
55	Loss	53–2	Pernell Whitaker	UD	12 (12)	1995-03-04	Convention Center, Atlantic City, New Jersey, U.S.	Lost WBA Light Middleweight title
54	Win	53–1	Mike Bonislawski	TKO	2 (10)	1995-02-04	Palais des Sports, Castelnau, France	
53	Win	52–1	Tony Marshall	UD	12 (12)	1994-11-11	Club Caja Popular, San Miguel, Argentina	Retained WBA Light Middleweight title
52	Win	51–1	Winky Wright	UD	12 (12)	1994-08-21	Jai Alai, Saint-Jean-de-Luz, France	Retained WBA Light Middleweight title
51	Win	50–1	Akhmet Dottuev	TKO	10 (12)	1994-05-21	King's Hall, Belfast, Northern Ireland, U.K.	Retained WBA Light Middleweight title
50	Win	49–1	Ricardo Raul Nunez	UD	12 (12)	1994-04-08	Club Defensores de Villa Lujan, San Miguel, Argentina	Retained WBA Light Middleweight title
49	Win	48–1	Armand Picar	TKO	2 (12)	1994-03-04	MGM Grand Garden Arena, Paradise, Nevada, U.S.	Retained WBA Light Middleweight title
48	Win	47–1	Juan Ramon Medina	UD	12 (12)	1994-01-22	Baluan Sholak Sports Palace, Almaty, Kazakhstan	Retained WBA Light Middleweight title
47	Win	46–1	Han Kim	KO	3 (10)	1993-10-01	Estadio Obras Sanitarias, Buenos Aires, Argentina	
46	Win	45–1	Aaron Davis	MD	12 (12)	1993-08-21	Salle des Étoiles, Monte Carlo, Monaco	Retained WBA Light Middleweight title
45	Win	44–1	Alejandro Ugueto	UD	12 (12)	1993-07-10	Club Defensores de Villa Lujan, San Miguel, Argentina	Retained WBA Light Middleweight title
44	Win	43–1	Javier Castillejo	UD	12 (12)	1993-04-24	Polideportivo Parquesur Sport, Leganes, Spain	Retained WBA Light Middleweight title
43	Win	42–1	Amaury Moguea	TKO	3 (10)	1993-03-27	Casino Royal, Evian les Bains, France	
42	Win	41–1	Aquilino Asprilla	UD	12 (12)	1993-02-22	Estadio Super Domo, Mar del Plata, Argentina	Retained WBA Light Middleweight title
41	Win	40–1	Hitoshi Kamiyama	KO	1 (12)	1992-12-21	Club Ferro Carril Oeste, Buenos Aires, Argentina	Won vacant WBA Light Middleweight title.
40	Win	39–1	David McCluskey	DQ	2 (10)	1992-08-14	Buenos Aires, Argentina	
39	Win	38–1	Anthony Ivory	UD	8 (8)	1992-07-11	Stade Louis II, Fontvieille, Monaco	
38	Win	37–1	Francisco Bernabé Bobadilla	TKO	7 (10)	1992-06-06	Buenos Aires, Argentina	
37	Win	36–1	Jorge Alberto Morello	KO	1 (10)	1992-05-08	Santa Fe, Argentina	
36	Win	35–1	Daniel Omar Dominguez	KO	1 (10)	1992-04-18	Buenos Aires, Argentina	
35	Win	34–1	Alberto Arreola	KO	1 (8)	1992-02-27	Paris, France	
34	Win	33–1	Louis Howard	KO	3 (8)	1991-11-21	Paris, France	
33	Win	32–1	Tyrone Trice	TKO	9 (10)	1991-09-19	Paris, France	
32	Win	31–1	Eduardo Domingo Contreras	TKO	2 (10)	1991-07-27	Estudios Canal 9 TV, Buenos Aires, Argentina	
31	Loss	30–1	Verno Phillips	DQ	6 (10)	1991-06-13	Campo Universitario de Deportes, Santa Fe, Argentina	
30	Win	30–0	Judas Clottey	KO	1 (8)	1991-05-22	Paris, France	
29	Win	29–0	Sergio Eduardo Ronconi	TKO	4 (10)	1991-03-16	Santa Fe, Argentina	
28	Win	28–0	Anibal Miranda	TKO	5 (8)	1991-02-23	Conference Centre, Brighton, England, U.K.	
27	Win	27–0	Isaias Monteiro	KO	2 (10)	1991-02-14	Santa Fe, Argentina	
26	Win	26–0	Alphonso Bailey	TKO	1 (8)	1990-11-24	Torrequebrada Hotel & Casino, Benalmadena, Spain	
25	Win	25–0	Jorge Argentino Tejada	PTS	10 (10)	1990-09-07	San Luis, Argentina	
24	Win	24–0	Ruben Elvicio Silva	TKO	2 (8)	1990-07-06	San Luis, Argentina	
23	Win	23–0	Raul Regino Sanchez	KO	1 (10)	1990-06-23	Buenos Aires, Argentina	
22	Win	22–0	Domingo Guzman Nunez	KO	2 (8)	1990-04-20	Santa Fe, Argentina	
21	Win	21–0	Troy Wortham	TKO	6 (10)	1989-11-18	Caesars Palace, Paradise, Nevada, U.S.	
20	Win	20–0	Edmundo Antonio Diaz	TKO	4 (10)	1989-05-05	Santa Fe, Argentina	
19	Win	19–0	Juan Carlos Ortiz	TKO	1 (10)	1989-03-10	Mar del Plata, Argentina	
18	Win	18–0	Felipe Guzman	TKO	3 (10)	1989-01-23	Punta del Este, Uruguay	
17	Win	17–0	Claudio Pereira	TKO	1 (10)	1988-12-10	Estadio F.A.B., Buenos Aires, Argentina	
16	Win	16–0	Jorge Pino Bermudez	PTS	10 (10)	1988-10-10	San Miguel, Argentina	
15	Win	15–0	Ricardo Alberto Carballo	TKO	8 (10)	1988-06-18	Estadio F.A.B., Buenos Aires, Argentina	
14	Win	14–0	Ramón Gaspar Abeldaño	TKO	9 (10)	1988-04-17	Santa Fe, Argentina	
13	Win	13–0	Simón Escobar	TKO	5 (10)	1988-02-04	Santa Fe, Argentina	
12	Win	12–0	Jorge Argentino Tejada	PTS	10 (10)	1987-11-12	Santa Fe, Argentina	
11	Win	11–0	Domingo Simón Sosa	KO	1 (10)	1987-10-09	Santa Fe, Argentina	
10	Win	10–0	Antonio René Juárez	PTS	10 (10)	1987-08-17	Santa Fe, Argentina	
9	Win	9–0	Juan Orlando Barboza	PTS	10 (10)	1987-07-10	Santa Fe, Argentina	
8	Win	8–0	Sergio Norberto Combis	PTS	10 (10)	1987-05-08	Santa Fe, Argentina	
7	Win	7–0	Daniel Elpidio Altamira	RTD	3 (10)	1987-03-14	San Genaro Norte, Argentina	
6	Win	6–0	Ramón Roque Vanos	DQ	4 (6)	1986-12-13	Estadio Luna Park, Buenos Aires, Argentina	
5	Win	5–0	Jose Alejandro Rivera	KO	2 (6)	1986-11-28	Salta, Argentina	
4	Win	4–0	José María Carabajal	KO	2 (8)	1986-09-12	Santa Fe, Argentina	
3	Win	3–0	José Luís Díaz	KO	2 (8)	1986-08-08	Santa Fe, Argentina	
2	Win	2–0	Eusebio Escalante	TKO	4 (6)	1986-07-04	Santa Fe, Argentina	
1	Win	1–0	Marcelo Antonio Chancalay	UD	6 (6)	1986-06-07	Estadio Luna Park, Buenos Aires, Argentina	

== See also ==
- List of world light-middleweight boxing champions

Sporting positions
World boxing titles
Vacant Title last held by Vinny Paz	WBA super welterweight champion 21 December 1992 – 4 March 1995	Succeeded by Pernell Whitaker
Preceded by Carl Daniels	WBA super welterweight champion 16 December 1995 – 21 August 1996	Succeeded by Laurent Boudouani
Awards
Previous: Marcelo Milanesio	Olimpia de Oro; 1994	Next: Nora Vega
Previous: George Foreman	The Ring Knockout of the Year; 1995	Next: Wilfredo Vázquez
Previous: Santos Laciar	Konex de Platino; 2000	Next: Omar Narváez
