= Larry Barnes (boxer) =

American professional boxer

Personal information
- Nickname: No Fear
- Born: November 11, 1965 (age 60) Mount Vernon, New York, U.S.
- Height: 5 ft 5 in (165 cm)

Boxing career
- Reach: 68 in (173 cm)
- Stance: Orthodox

Boxing record
- Total fights: 48
- Wins: 44
- Win by KO: 17
- Losses: 3
- Draws: 1

Larry Barnes (born November 11, 1965) is an American former professional boxer.

== Professional career ==
On November 18, 1995, (just one week after his thirtieth birthday) he challenged Felix Trinidad for the Puerto Rican's International Boxing Federation's world Welterweight title, losing by a fourth-round knockout. Held at the Atlantic City Convention Center in Atlantic City, New Jersey, the fight was broadcast live on HBO Boxing. On September 18, 1998, he was a challenger for a world title again, fighting Mexican Yory Boy Campas for Campas' IBF world Super Welterweight title, losing to Campas by third-round knockout. The Campas bout was in Las Vegas, Nevada.

Barnes retired after the Campas contest, with a record of 44 wins, 3 losses and 1 draw (tie) in 48 fights, with 17 wins and 2 losses by knockout. Two of his three losses were in world title fights. Barnes was the North American Boxing Federation's Welterweight champion, a title he won after beating Harold Brazier by a 12 rounds split decision on May 13, 1993, in New York, New York.

== Personal life ==
Barnes is from Mount Vernon, New York. At the time of his fight with Campas, he was the swimming team's coach at Mount Vernon High School.

== Professional boxing record ==
48 fights	44 wins	3 losses
By knockout	17	2
By decision	27	1
Draws	1	
