= Félix Trinidad vs. Bernard Hopkins =

Boxing competition

And Then There Was One
- Poster with an original date window
- Date: September 29, 2001
- Venue: Madison Square Garden, New York City, New York, U.S.
- Title(s) on the line: WBA (Super), WBC, and IBF undisputed middleweight championship

Tale of the tape
Boxer	Félix Trinidad	Bernard Hopkins
Nickname	Tito	The Executioner
Hometown	Fajardo, San Juan, Puerto Rico	Philadelphia, Pennsylvania, U.S.
Purse	$9,000,000	$2,500,000
Pre-fight record	40–0 (33 KO)	39–2–1 (1) (28 KO)
Age	28 years, 8 months	36 years, 8 months
Height	5 ft 11 in (180 cm)	6 ft 1 in (185 cm)
Weight	158 1/2 lb (72 kg)	157 lb (71 kg)
Style	Orthodox	Orthodox
Recognition	WBA; Middleweight Champion; The Ring No. 2 ranked pound-for-pound fighter 3-division world champion	WBC and IBF; Middleweight Champion; The Ring No. 7 ranked pound-for-pound fighter

Result
- Hopkins wins via 12th-round TKO

Félix Trinidad vs. Bernard Hopkins, billed as And Then There Was One, was a boxing match that took place on September 29, 2001, at Madison Square Garden in New York City, between WBC and IBF middleweight champion Bernard Hopkins and WBA middleweight champion Félix Trinidad to unify all three titles and decide the first undisputed middleweight champion since Marvin Hagler. Hopkins defeated Trinidad in twelve rounds; in addition to consolidating the three titles, he was named The Ring middleweight champion. The undercard featured championship fights in three other weight classes.

== Background ==
Hopkins had made 12 consecutive title defenses as a middleweight and was looking to make it 14, tying him with Carlos Monzón for record defences. At around the same time, Félix Trinidad had cleaned out the welterweight division, defeating everybody in front of him, including a win over Oscar De La Hoya. Following this he made the move to Super Welterweight defeating Fernando Vargas. He then decided to move up to middleweight. Don King had then organized a middleweight tournament featuring Keith Holmes, William Joppy, Bernard Hopkins & Félix Trinidad.

On April 14, 2001, Hopkins defeated Keith Holmes by unanimous decision to retain IBF middleweight championship and also capture the WBC belt. By defeating Holmes, Hopkins advanced to the final.

The bout was originally scheduled for September 15, 2001, but because of the September 11 terrorist attacks it was postponed for two weeks until September 29.

The event marked the first time it was aired on HBO PPV, following the rebranding from TVKO.

== The fight ==
The fight began slowly, with both fighters circling the ring at a distance and trading jabs in a close first round.

The second round follows suit, with Hopkins and Trinidad still feeling each other out and staying away from one another. Hopkins lands the first big punch of the fight, an overhand right just before the bell.

Hopkins begins to get comfortable in the third and take the fight to Trinidad, landing his jab consistently from the outside.

In the fourth, the pace picks up and Trinidad lands his first power punches of the night. Hopkins takes the punches well and comes back with big blows of his own in the round's closing seconds.

Hopkins, typically known for his brawling style, continues to go against form in the fifth by constantly moving around the ring and outboxing Trinidad. The style seems to confuse Trinidad, who gets caught by good shots throughout the round.

Trinidad has his best round in the sixth, backing Hopkins against the ropes and landing multiple left hooks. It is the first round that clearly goes to Trinidad.

The pace of the fight slowed in the seventh round. Hopkins maintained more mobility, avoiding many of Trinidad's punches while landing several combinations. Trinidad continued to move forward but struggled to land significant scoring shots during this round.

Trinidad senses he is in trouble and comes out firing in the tenth. But after throwing several flurries that do no damage, it appears he has punched himself out. Hopkins lands huge punches in the last minute and stuns Trinidad with a right to the chin just before the bell.

Trinidad comes for the eleventh on very shaky legs. By contrast Hopkins is looking completely fresh and Trinidad begins to hold on in desperation.

Before the last round, Trinidad is slumped in his corner exhausted, while Hopkins smiles and looks animated on his stool. Hopkins lands punch after punch on an obviously beaten Trinidad. Midway through the round, he connects with a huge right to the chin that leaves Trinidad crumpled on the canvas. Felix Trinidad Sr. enters the ring and tells Steve Smoger to stop the fight.

At the time of the stoppage, Bernard Hopkins was leading the bout on all three judges' scorecards. Don Ackerman had the bout 109–100 whilst both Stanley Christodoulou & Anek Hongtongkam scored the bout 107–102 all in favour of Bernard Hopkins. HBO unofficial ringside scorer Harold Lederman had Hopkins up 108–101.

== Aftermath ==
After the fight, Bernard Hopkins was named 2001 Ring Magazine Fighter of the Year, and also won this award from the World Boxing Hall of Fame.

Félix Trinidad went on to fight Hacini Cherifi before announcing his retirement from boxing. He then made several comebacks, defeating Ricardo Mayorga and losing to Winky Wright and Roy Jones Jr. In September 2009, Trinidad announced that he had officially retired. His father, Félix Trinidad, Sr. announced that his son had not even entered a gym following his January 2008 defeat to Roy Jones Jr.

Bernard Hopkins went on to defeat several big names, including Oscar De La Hoya and William Joppy, as well as defend his middleweight title another six times. In total, he defended his various titles twenty times before finally being dethroned by Jermain Taylor. Following the two Taylor fights, Hopkins defeated 3-to-1 betting favourite, Antonio Tarver. He then defeated Winky Wright in a catchweight 170 lb fight. Following this he lost a close split decision to Joe Calzaghe, but rebounded with a dominant victory over undefeated middleweight champion, Kelly Pavlik. On 21 May 2011, Hopkins at the age of 46 became the oldest world champion in boxing history by defeating Jean Pascal by unanimous decision for the WBC and The Ring Light Heavyweight Championship.

=== Rematch ===
Following his victory over Kelly Pavlik, Hopkins began a search for an opponent. Many names were thrown around including Tomasz Adamek, Chad Dawson and Steve Cunningham as well as potential rematches with Roy Jones Jr., Glen Johnson and Joe Calzaghe. None of the aforementioned bouts materialised during this time, and Hopkins was approached by Don King about a potential rematch with Trinidad. Representatives for the pair met but were unable to hash out a deal. Bernard Hopkins instead opted to face Enrique Ornelas and to fight Roy Jones Jr. in a rematch. He won both bouts by unanimous decision.

== Fight card ==
Confirmed bouts:

Weight Class	Weight		vs.		Method	Round	Time	Notes
Middleweight	160 lbs.	(United States) Bernard Hopkins (c)	def.	(Puerto Rico) Félix Trinidad (c)	TKO	12/12	1:18	^{Note 1}
Super middleweight	168 lbs.	(United States) Byron Mitchell (c)	def.	(Puerto Rico) Manny Siaca	SD	12/12		^{Note 2}
Welterweight	147 lbs.	(Italy) Michele Piccirillo	def.	(Colombia) Rafael Pineda	UD	12/12		^{Note 3}
Light flyweight	108 lbs.	(Mexico) Ricardo López (c)	def.	(South Africa) Zolani Petelo	KO	8/12	1:32	^{Note 4}
Light flyweight	108 lbs.	(Puerto Rico) Nelson Dieppa (c)	def.	(Thailand) Fahlan Sakkreerin	UD	12/12		^{Note 5}

^Note 1 For Undisputed World Middleweight Championship
WBA, WBC, IBF middleweight titles
For vacant lineal middleweight title
^Note 2 For WBA super middlweight title
^Note 3 For IBF Welterweight title eliminator
^Note 4 For IBF light flyweight title
^Note 5 For WBO light flyweight title

== Broadcasting ==
Country	Broadcaster
Australia	Main Event
United States	HBO

== Notes ==
1.Originally scheduled on September 15, 2001.

Preceded by vs. William Joppy	Félix Trinidad's bouts 29 September 2001	Succeeded by vs. Hacine Cherifi
Preceded by vs. Keith Holmes	Bernard Hopkins's bouts 29 September 2001	Succeeded by vs. Carl Daniels
Awards
Preceded by Erik Morales vs. Marco Antonio Barrera; Round 5	The Ring Round of the Year; Round 10; 2001	Succeeded by Arturo Gatti vs. Micky Ward; Round 9
