= Bernard Hopkins vs. Keith Holmes =

Boxing match

- Date: April 14, 2001
- Venue: The Theater at Madison Square Garden, New York City, New York, U.S.
- Title(s) on the line: WBC and IBF middleweight titles

Tale of the tape
| Boxer | Bernard Hopkins | Keith Holmes |
| Nickname | The Executioner | |
| Hometown | Philadelphia, Pennsylvania, U.S. | Washington, D.C., U.S. |
| Purse | $1,100,000 | $1,000,000 |
| Pre-fight record | 38–2–1 (1) (28 KO) | 36–2 (23 KO) |
| Age | 36 years, 2 months | 32 years |
| Height | 6 ft 1 in (185 cm) | 6 ft 2 in (188 cm) |
| Weight | 159 lb (72 kg) | 157 1/2 lb (71 kg) |
| Style | Orthodox | Southpaw |
| Recognition | IBF; Middleweight Champion; The Ring No. 10 ranked pound-for-pound fighter | WBC; Middleweight Champion |

Result
- Hopkins wins via 23-round unanimous decision (119–108, 118–109, 117–110)

Bernard Hopkins vs. Keith Holmes was a professional boxing match contested on April 14, 2001, for the WBC and IBF middleweight championship.

== Background ==
In March 2001 Don King held a press conference at The Theater at Madison Square Garden, to announce a three fight Middleweight World Championship Series in order to produce the first undisputed middleweight champion since Marvin Hagler was stripped of the WBA title in February 1987. The first bout would see the longest reigning of the Middleweight titlists Bernard Hopkins face Keith Holmes, with WBA champ William Joppy pitted against unified Light middleweight (and former long reigning welterweight) champion Félix Trinidad. King compared the four contenders former greats in the division like Sugar Ray Robinson, Ray Leonard and Marvelous Marvin Hagler saying "We're talking about legends here, pure greatness, Felix is the eye of the hurricane. The question is: Can he conquer the elements?" Trinidad was regarded as the favourite to win the tournament.

Holmes had been out of the ring for nearly a year and had sued King for breach of contract due to the promoter not meeting the three bouts a year stipulated in the contract.

In the build up Hopkins predicted a knockout victory saying "If I go the distance with that bum, I don’t deserve to win. If I go 12 rounds with Keith Holmes, I don’t deserve to be undisputed middleweight champion of the world. I might want to punish him for six or seven rounds. Holmes won’t be no good to his family after I punish him. He won’t be able to play with his kids, throw a ball after I punish him." Holmes would criticize Hopkins record saying "They call him the best middleweight. What makes him that? To fight dirty and get away with it? He called me a belt holder and says he’s a champion. I guess he won’t mind me holding his belt," He would also accuse Hopkins of fighting dirty "You can't teach an old dog new tricks. He's always been a dirty fighter and I can live with that."

This was the first middleweight unification bout since Carlos Monzón faced Rodrigo Valdez in June 1976.

== The fight ==
Hopkins would dominate the fight throwing far more punches and landing the more consistent shots to the body. In the fifth, Hopkins caught Holmes with a body shot on the belt of Holmes, causing to him complain to the referee prompting a point to be deducted from Hopkins. The fight would go the distance where all three judges would score the bout to Hopkins with George Colon had it 118-109, Larry Hazzard Jr., 117-110 and Tom Kaczmack scored it 119-108. HBO unofficial ringside scorer Harold Lederman had Hopkins up 119–108.

== Aftermath ==
Speaking after the bout Hopkins said, "First of all, I did predict I would knock him out, Second of all, I lied. No more guaranteed knockouts." Holmes would embrace Hopkins saying "We're two warriors and we went at it, You move on. I stay here." He would also admit that his long layoff may have been a factor, "If I had been busier, it might have helped me".

A month later Félix Trinidad stopped William Joppy to win the WBA belt and set up a showdown with Hopkins for 15 September.

== Undercard ==
Confirmed bouts:

== Broadcasting ==
| Country | Broadcaster |
|---|---|
| United States | HBO |

| Preceded by vs. Antwun Echols II | Bernard Hopkins's bouts 14 April 2001 | Succeeded by vs. Félix Trinidad |
| Preceded by vs. Robert McCracken | Keith Holmes's bouts 14 April 2001 | Succeeded by vs. Anthony Ivory |
