= William Joppy vs. Félix Trinidad =

Boxing match

History in the Making
- Date: May 12, 2001
- Venue: Madison Square Garden, New York City, New York, U.S.
- Title(s) on the line: WBA middleweight title

Tale of the tape
Boxer	William Joppy	Félix Trinidad
Nickname		"Tito"
Hometown	Silver Spring, Maryland, U.S.	Fajardo, San Juan, Puerto Rico
Purse	$1,100,000	$10,000,000
Pre-fight record	32–1–1 (24 KO)	39–0 (32 KO)
Age	30 years, 8 months	28 years, 4 months
Height	5 ft 9 in (175 cm)	5 ft 11 in (180 cm)
Weight	158 3/4 lb (72 kg)	159 1/4 lb (72 kg)
Style	Orthodox	Orthodox
Recognition	WBA; Middleweight Champion	WBA and IBF; Light Middleweight Champion; The Ring No. 2 ranked pound-for-pound fighter 2-division world champion

Result
- Trinidad defeated Joppy by 5th round TKO

William Joppy vs. Félix Trinidad, billed as History in the Making, was a professional boxing match contested on May 12, 2001, for the WBA middleweight championship.

== Background ==
In March 2001 Don King held a press conference at The Theater at Madison Square Garden, to announce a three fight Middleweight World Championship Series in order to produce the first undisputed middleweight champion since Marvin Hagler was stripped of the WBA title in February 1987. The first bout would see the longest reigning of the Middleweight titlists Bernard Hopkins face Keith Holmes, with WBA champ William Joppy pitted against unified Light middleweight (and former long reigning welterweight) champion Félix Trinidad. King compared the four contenders former greats in the division like Sugar Ray Robinson, Ray Leonard and Marvelous Marvin Hagler saying "We're talking about legends here, pure greatness, Felix is the eye of the hurricane. The question is: Can he conquer the elements?" Trinidad was regarded as the favourite to win the tournament.

On 14 April, Hopkins scored a dominant decision victory over Holmes moving into the final to await the winner between Joppy and Trinidad.

Joppy would appear unimpressed with Trinidad in the build up saying "I think he's a little overrated, I want to show he doesn't belong in the ring with me." Trinidad, a 3-1 favourite to win the bout, predicted a knockout victory.

== The fights ==
=== Undercard ===
The first bout on the PPV card saw Christy Martin take a majority decision over Kathy Collins.

=== Frank vs. Forrest II ===
The first of the two world title bouts saw IBF No. 1 ranked Raul Frank take on unbeaten No. 2 ranked Vernon Forrest, for the welterweight belt vacated by Trinidad when he moved up to Light middleweight.

The two had met the previous August, with the bout ending in a no contest after a clash of head led to Frank being unable to continue.

==== The fight ====
Forrest used his left jab and overhand right to control the action, preventing Frank from getting inside and stopping him from being effective.

At the end of 12 rounds, two judges scored it 115–110 and the third had it 120–108 all in favour of Forrest. HBO's unofficial ringside scorer Harold Lederman scored the bout a shutout of 120–108 for Forrest.

Speaking after the bout Forrest admitted "I hurt my right hand in the third round and couldn't get any power, but I stayed with it".

Preceded by First bout	Raul Frank's bouts 12 May 2001	Succeeded by vs. Alex Carrillo Villa
Preceded by First bout	Vernon Forrest's bouts 12 May 2001	Succeeded by vs. Edgar Ruiz

=== Byrd vs. Harris ===
The penultimate bout, saw former WBO heavyweight titleholder Chris Byrd face Maurice Harris in a semi final of an IBF heavyweight elimination tournament. The winner would be set to face David Tua who had stopped Danell Nicholson in March.

Despite an aggressive start from Harris, Byrd would take control and out box his opponent for most of the fight. Harris would be dropped in the 6th round after a left to body followed up by one to chin. He beat the count but his apparent lack of conditioning prevented him from taking the fight to Byrd.

The bout went the full 10 rounds and Byrd was awarded a unanimous decision victory with two cards of 117–110 and one of 118–109.

=== Main Event ===
The crowd of more than 18,000 at Madison Square Garden would witness a dominant display from Trinidad in his middleweight debut. Knocking Joppy down in the 1st 4th and 5th rounds before Arthur Mercante, Jr. opted to wave off the contest with 30 seconds left in the 5th.

== Aftermath ==
Speaking after the bout Trinidad said "You guys saw tonight I'm a true middleweight. I beat the best middleweight tonight, and I will beat Hopkins". Joppy would credit Trinidad saying "He's a great champion, I never thought he could hit that hard. I never thought he would have the power that he had coming from 154 to 160 pounds. I've never been hit like that before."

With the victory Trinidad moved on to the final against Hopkins as well becoming the first former welterweight champion to win a middleweight title, since Roberto Durán against Iran Barkley in 1989.

== Undercard ==
Confirmed bouts:

Winner	Loser	Weight division/title belt(s) disputed	Result
(United States) Chris Byrd	(United States) Maurice Harris	USBA Heavyweight title	Unanimous decision
(United States) Vernon Forrest	(Guyana) Raul Frank	IBF World Welterweight title	Unanimous decision
(United States) Christy Martin	(United States) Kathy Collins	Welterweight (10 rounds)	Majority decision
Non-TV bouts
(Puerto Rico) Daniel Seda	(Ghana) Nana Konadu	WBA Fedelatin Featherweight title	9th-round TKO.
(Italy) Michele Piccirillo	(Venezuela) Elio Ortiz	Light Middleweight (12 rounds)	No Contest
(Puerto Rico) Felix Flores	(United States) Gerald Gray	Welterweight (10 rounds)	4th-round TKO.
(Dominican Republic) Julio Cesar Green	(Cayman Islands) Charles Whittaker	Super Middleweight (8 rounds)	Draw
(United States) Shamir Reyes	(United States) James Baker	Lightweight (4 rounds)	Draw
(United States) Chantel Stanciel	(Colombia) Alex Lubo	Light Middleweight (4 rounds)	2nd-round TKO.
(Puerto Rico) Freddie Cadena	(United States) Andre Baker	Super Lightweight (4 rounds)	Unanimous decision

== Broadcasting ==
Country	Broadcaster
United States	HBO

Preceded by vs. Jonathan Reid	William Joppy's bouts 12 May 2001	Succeeded by vs. Howard Eastman
Preceded by vs. Fernando Vargas	Félix Trinidad's bouts 12 May 2001	Succeeded by vs. Bernard Hopkins
