= Bruce Seldon vs. Mike Tyson =

Boxing match

Liberation
- Date: September 7, 1996
- Venue: MGM Grand Garden Arena, Paradise, Nevada
- Title on the line: WBA heavyweight title

Tale of the tape
Boxer	Bruce Seldon	Mike Tyson
Nickname	The Atlantic City Express	Iron
Hometown	Atlantic City, New Jersey	Catskill, New York
Purse	$5,000,000	$15,000,000
Pre-fight record	33–3 (29 KO)	44–1 (38 KO)
Age	29 years, 7 months	30 years, 2 months
Height	6 ft 1 1/4 in (186 cm)	5 ft 10 in (178 cm)
Weight	229 lb (104 kg)	219 lb (99 kg)
Style	Orthodox	Orthodox
Recognition	WBA; Heavyweight Champion	WBC; Heavyweight Champion

Result
- Tyson wins via 1st-round KO

Bruce Seldon vs. Mike Tyson, billed as Liberation, was a professional boxing match fought on September 7, 1996 for the WBA heavyweight championship. Tyson defeated Seldon in a 1st-round knockout, and shortly afterwards Seldon would retire from boxing.

The fight was part of a pay-per-view event produced by Don King Productions and carried on pay-per-view by Showtime.

The fight is notable in the fact that in attendance was rapper and actor Tupac Shakur, who would be fatally shot just hours after the fight, following an altercation with Crips member Orlando "Baby Lane" Anderson at the casino. Shakur died six days later on September 13 from ballistic trauma.

== Background ==
After George Foreman was stripped of his WBA Heavyweight title for refusing to fight number one contender Tony Tucker, the WBA organized a fight between Tucker and little–known Bruce Seldon to determine who would become WBA Heavyweight champion. Seldon was able to defeat the aging Tucker by referee technical decision after the fight was stopped in the seventh round due to Tucker's eye being completely swollen shut. He would then successfully defend the title against Joe Hipp, who became the first Native American to challenge for a major heavyweight title, on the undercard of the Tyson–McNeeley fight on September 7, 1995.

Since being released from prison, Mike Tyson had won all three of his fights in dominating fashion, defeating fringe contenders Peter McNeeley and Buster Mathis, Jr. and then capturing the WBC Heavyweight title by defeating Frank Bruno via 3rd-round knockout. Tyson was then tasked with facing the WBC's number one contender, Lennox Lewis, who was next-in-line for a title shot against the winner of the Tyson–Bruno fight. After negotiations for a championship bout between them were halted when Lewis' team and executives at HBO refused successive offers of $8 million, $10 million, $13.5 million, and $16 million, promoter Don King then agreed to pay Lewis $4 million in order for the challenger to step aside and allow Tyson to face Seldon, the reigning WBA champion, in what was initially planned to be a unification bout for their respective titles. Seldon was a 22-1 underdog going in to the bout.

== The fights ==
=== Undercard ===
The first of the televised bout saw Christy Martin score a 4th round knockout over Melinda Robinson with a overhand right to the chin.

=== Trinidad vs. Lovato ===
Liberation:Félix Trinidad vs. Ray Lovato
- Title on the line: IBF welterweight title

Tale of the tape
Boxer	Félix Trinidad	Ray Lovato
Nickname	Tito	Dangerous
Hometown	Cupey Alto, San Juan, Puerto Rico	Sacramento, California, U.S.
Purse	$700,000	$58,000
Pre-fight record	29–0 (25 KO)	21–1 (11 KO)
Age	23 years, 7 months	26 years, 7 months
Height	5 ft 11 in (180 cm)	5 ft 7 1/2 in (171 cm)
Weight	147 lb (67 kg)	146 1/2 lb (66 kg)
Style	Orthodox	Orthodox
Recognition	IBF; Welterweight Champion; The Ring No. 5 ranked pound-for-pound fighter	IBF; No. 9 Ranked Welterweight

Result
- Trinidad defeats Lovato by 6th round TKO

In the first of three world title bouts on the card, IBF welterweight champion Félix Trinidad faced IBF No. 9 ranked contender Ray Lovato.

==== The fight ====
Trinidad would start the bout slowly, measuring the elusive Lovato before rocking him in the fifth with a right hand. In the sixth, the champion caught Lovato with a sharp left-right combination near the ropes sending him staggered against the ropes, prompting referee Mitch Halpern to step in and wave off the bout.

At the time of the stoppage, two judges had Trinidad ahead 49–46 with the other having him 48–47.

==== Aftermath ====
Lovato would criticize the stoppage saying "I thought it was stopped too soon. I thought I was winning."

Preceded by vs. Freddie Pendleton	Félix Trinidad's bouts 7 September 1996	Succeeded by vs. Kevin Lueshing
Preceded by vs. Jose Luis Verdugo	Ray Lovato's bouts 7 September 1996	Succeeded by vs. Leroy Owens

=== Norris vs. Rios ===
The next world title bout saw unified 154 lb champion Terry Norris face WBC No. 9 ranked contender Alex Rios.

==== The fight ====
Norris dropped Rios in the fourth and in the fifth round when a overhand right sent Rios in his own corner, with Norris winging away with combinations prompting referee Mills Lane to wave it off.

=== Main event ===
Tyson easily defeated Seldon by 1st-round knockout in one of the shortest heavyweight championship fights in boxing history, lasting just 1:49. Tyson was aggressive from the opening bell. Seldon attempted to weather Tyson’s storm by attempting to connect his powerful left jab, but Tyson was able to dodge Seldon’s attempts. At around 1:12 of the fight, Seldon was knocked down by a left hook thrown by Tyson, immediately followed by a straight right that only grazed Seldon. Seldon answered the referee’s count at 8 and continued the fight only to almost immediately get knocked down again by another left hook. Seldon got back on his feet but was unable to maintain his balance, causing referee Richard Steele to stop the fight and award Tyson the victory by technical knockout.

== "Fix" controversy ==
Almost immediately after the fight, the audience began chanting "Fix!", having thought Seldon took a dive in order for Tyson to win the championship and move on to face Evander Holyfield. The crowd would continue to serenade Seldon with chants of "Fix!" as he remained in the ring for an interview with Jim Gray. Gray would openly ask Seldon if he did in fact take a dive, but Seldon professed his innocence, stating "I didn't train 12 weeks to come in here and take a dive."

== Aftermath ==
After his embarrassing loss, Seldon would retire from boxing, eventually staging a comeback in 2004 at the age of 37. Meanwhile, Tyson would officially vacate his WBC title and proceed with his much anticipated match with Holyfield for the WBA Heavyweight championship. Though Tyson was a 6–1 favorite, Holyfield scored a stunning upset victory by defeating Tyson via 11th-round technical knockout. Tyson would subsequently lose the rematch by disqualification in 1997 as well as his next Heavyweight title match in 2002 against Lennox Lewis. As such, the Seldon match would be Tyson's final heavyweight championship victory.

The vacant WBC belt was contested in February 1997, with Lennox Lewis defeating Oliver McCall.

Rapper Tupac Shakur was attending the fight that night, and was fatally shot after the fight in a drive-by shooting.

== Undercard ==
Confirmed bouts:

Winner	Loser	Weight division/title belt(s) disputed	Result
(United States) Terry Norris	(United States) Alex Rios	WBC and IBF Light Middleweight title	5th round TKO.
(United States) Félix Trinidad	(United States) Ray Lovato	IBF World Welterweight title	6th round TKO.
(United States) Christy Martin	(United States) Melinda Robinson	Welterweight (8 rounds)	4th round KO.
Non-TV bouts
(United States) Carl Daniels	(United States) Roland Rangel	Middleweight (10 rounds)	4th round RTD
(Japan) Yuichi Kasai	(Mexico) Julio Cesar Cardona	Super bantamweight (10 rounds)	Unanimous decision
(Puerto Rico) Andy Agosto	(Mexico) Raul Rios	Super flyweight (10 rounds)	Unanimous decision
(South Africa) Gary Ballard	(Sudan) Abdullah Ramadan	Super middleweight (6 rounds)	Unanimous decision
(United States) Rodney Jones	(United States) Stephan Johnson	Light Middleweight (4 rounds)	Unanimous decision
(United States) Donald Stokes	(United States) Mark Fernandez	Light Middleweight (4 rounds)	Unanimous decision

== Broadcasting ==
Country	Broadcaster
United States	Showtime
Thailand	Channel 3

Preceded by vs. Joe Hipp	Bruce Seldon's bouts 7 September 1996	Succeeded by vs. Otis Tisdale
Preceded by vs. Frank Bruno II	Mike Tyson's bouts 7 September 1996	Succeeded by vs. Evander Holyfield
