= Félix Trinidad vs. Fernando Vargas =

Boxing match

Forces of Destruction
- Date: December 2, 2000
- Venue: Mandalay Bay Events Center, Paradise, Nevada, U.S.
- Title(s) on the line: WBA and IBF light middleweight titles

Tale of the tape
Boxer	Félix Trinidad	Fernando Vargas
Nickname	Tito	Ferocious
Hometown	Fajardo, San Juan, Puerto Rico	Oxnard, California, U.S.
Purse	$4,000,000	$2,500,000
Pre-fight record	38–0 (31 KO)	20–0 (18 KO)
Age	27 years, 10 months	22 years, 11 months
Height	5 ft 11 in (180 cm)	5 ft 10 in (178 cm)
Weight	154 lb (70 kg)	154 lb (70 kg)
Style	Orthodox	Orthodox
Recognition	WBA light middleweight champion The Ring No. 3 ranked pound-for-pound fighter 2-division world champion	IBF light middleweight champion The Ring pound-for-pound No. 9 ranked fighter

Result
- Trinidad defeated Vargas by 12th round TKO

Félix Trinidad vs. Fernando Vargas, billed as Forces of Destruction, was a professional boxing match contested on December 2, 2000, for the WBA and IBF light middleweight championship.

== Background ==
Since moving up to light middleweight division to defeat David Reid for the WBA title, Félix Trinidad had made one successful defence, against mandatory contender Mamadou Thiam. Following that fight Trinidad's promoter Don King expressed interest in a unification bout with IBF champion Fernando Vargas, describing it as "a fight we want".

During the press tour to promote the bout, Trinidad would say "For the public, this is going to be the fight of the year. This will be a big fight and I know Vargas is a good fighter, but I am convinced I'm going to win." Meanwhile, Vargas predicted a knockout saying "I've never been down, but he's been down six or seven times, if I hurt him, I will stop him".

The Nevada State Athletic Commission conducted a coin toss to determine who would enter the ring second, which Trinidad won, allowing Vargas to be introduced last.

Trinidad initially failed to make the 154 Ib light middleweight limit, initially weighing half a pound over the limit and needed 10 minutes before he made the weight. Vargas' reaction was to say "I don't come here to embarrass myself, I came here to make weight."

Trinidad was a 7 to 5 favourite to win with the bookies. Many boxing experts were split on who would win, with Steve Farhood, the former editor of Ring magazine saying "I'm picking Trinidad but only because I have to. It's as difficult to call as any fight I can remember. I just don't feel Trinidad's weaknesses play into Vargas's strengths. Trinidad is the harder puncher and more experienced and is just as natural at the weight".

== The fight ==
Trinidad would start the bout strong, dropping Vargas with a left hook within the first 30 seconds, he would beat the count but would be dropped against inside the first minute. Vargas would work his way back into the bout catching Trinidad with a left hook to the jaw which landed him the seat of his trunks. Trinidad beat the count and with 2 minutes remaining in the round, a left hook from Trinidad landed in Vargas' groin causing him to sink to the floor on his knees. Referee Jay Nady halted the action and deducted a point from Trinidad. Vargas stayed down for almost three minutes before the fight resumed. Trinidad would largely control much of the fight with his left jabs and sharp left hooks. Late in the 6th round Trinidad caught Vargas with a borderline blow and was penalized another point. Vargas lost a point in the 10th, also for a low blow. With his left eye closing and appearing to be behind on the cards Vargas would go on the attack in the final round but a counter left hook from Trinidad sent him to the floor for the third time. He was up at the count of seven but shortly after the bout resumed another left hook to the head floored him again. Vargas would try to continue but a volley of powerful shots from Trinidad including a right hand to the chin drove the IBF champion into the ropes and dropped him to his knees for the third time in the round. Nady would quickly step in and wave the bout off with half of the round left. At the time of the stoppage Trinidad led on all three scorecards, 103–100, 104–100 and 104–99. HBO's unofficial scorer Harold Lederman had Trinidad ahead 103–100 while the Associated Press scored it 105–98 for Trinidad.

== Aftermath ==
Trinidad would praise Vargas after the bout saying "Without a doubt he punches hard and that was my toughest fight. He hit me with a good left hook and he hurt me a little, but I was in great condition and came back. I'm a great champion." There were already suggestions that Trinidad next move up to face WBA middleweight champion William Joppy who scored a 4th-round TKO victory over late replacement Jonathan Reid on the undercard.

Despite Vargas expressing interest in a rematch, Trinidad would instead agree to move up to middleweight to enter the Middleweight World Championship Series, organized by his promoter Don King, with his first bout being against Joppy.

Vargas meanwhile would rebound from his loss and in September 2001 would win the WBA belt vacated by Trinidad, making him a two-time champion.

== Undercard ==
Confirmed bouts:

Winner	Loser	Weight division/title belt(s) disputed	Result
(Mexico) Ricardo López	(Thailand) Anucha Phothong	IBF World Light Flyweight title	3rd-round TKO.
(United States) William Joppy	(United States) Jonathan Reid	WBA World Middleweight title	4th-round TKO.
(United States) Christy Martin	(United States) Sabrina Hall	Welterweight (8 rounds)	1st-round KO.
Non-TV bouts
(Mexico) Jose Flores	(United States) Emmett Linton	NABA Super Welterweight title	Unanimous decision
(Puerto Rico) Juan Gomez	(Mexico) Arturo Reyes	Super Lightweight (10 rounds)	2nd-round TKO.
(Mexico) Miguel Angel Gonzalez	(Colombia) Alex Lubo	Light Middleweight (10 rounds)	1st-round TKO.
(Ghana) Nana Konadu	(Panama) Amador Vasquez	Featherweight (6 rounds)	5th-round TKO.
(Belarus) Siarhei Liakhovich	(United States) Derrell Dixon	Heavyweight (4 rounds)	Majority decision
(United States) Eduardo Mendivil	(Mexico) Raul Erick Flores	Light Middleweight (4 rounds)	Unanimous decision

== Broadcasting ==
Country	Broadcaster
United States	HBO

Preceded by vs. Mamadou Thiam	Félix Trinidad's bouts 2 December 2000	Succeeded by vs. William Joppy
Preceded by vs. Ross Thompson	Fernando Vargas's bouts 2 December 2000	Succeeded by vs. Wilfredo Rivera
