= Mike Tyson vs. Buster Mathis Jr. =

Boxing match

Presumption of Innocence
- Date: December 16, 1995
- Venue: Spectrum, Philadelphia, Pennsylvania

Tale of the tape
Boxer	Mike Tyson	Buster Mathis Jr.
Nickname	Iron	
Hometown	Catskill, New York, U.S.	Grand Rapids, Michigan, U.S.
Purse	$10,000,000	$600,000
Pre-fight record	42–1 (36 KO)	20–0 (2) (6 KO)
Age	29 years, 5 months	25 years, 8 months
Height	5 ft 10 in (178 cm)	6 ft 0 in (183 cm)
Weight	219 lb (99 kg)	224 lb (102 kg)
Style	Orthodox	Orthodox
Recognition	WBA/WBC; No. 1 Ranked Heavyweight; IBF/The Ring; No. 3 Ranked Heavyweight; Former undisputed heavyweight champion	IBF; No. 4 Ranked Heavyweight; WBC; No. 17 Ranked Heavyweight; USBA Heavyweight Champion

Result
- Tyson wins via 3rd-round knockout

Mike Tyson vs. Buster Mathis Jr., billed as Presumption of Innocence, was a professional boxing match contested on December 16, 1995.

== Background ==
Mike Tyson had returned to boxing after a three-year prison stint with an 89-second victory over Peter McNeeley. After his victory, Tyson's rank as the number one ranked heavyweight was restored by two of the three major boxing organizations (the WBA and WBC). Before he would fight for one of the three World Heavyweight titles, he would first partake in a second comeback fight.

Only days after his victory over McNeeley, it was announced that he would face the undefeated but virtually unknown Buster Mathis Jr. on November 4, 1995 at the MGM Grand Arena. The bout was originally scheduled to go up against the highly anticipated rubber match between Riddick Bowe and Evander Holyfield on pay-per-view, with Tyson–Mathis to be aired on Showtime, while Bowe–Holyfield would be broadcast on rival HBO. However, on September 14, Tyson promoter Don King would stun the boxing world by announcing that the Tyson–Mathis match would instead be broadcast for free on Fox.

Three weeks before the fight, Tyson suffered a broken thumb, but did not announce it until November 1, three days before the fight. In a press conference at the MGM Grand, Tyson announced the cancellation of the fight because of the injury. Then, on November 22, it was announced that the bout had been moved to Atlantic City with a December 16 date in place and that Showtime would air the fight instead of Fox.

Plans were changed after New Jersey gaming authorities ruled against having the fight in Atlantic City because Don King had been under suspension in New Jersey since 1994 because of legal troubles. On November 30, Philadelphia's CoreStates Spectrum was announced to host the fight with Fox regaining the rights to air it. The FOX telecast only broadcast the Tyson bout and the Norris vs. Vaden undercard bout, although other broadcasters did show at least the Daniels vs. Vásquez and the Tucker vs. Akinwande bouts.

Mathis was a 25 to 1 underdog to win.

== The fights ==
=== Undercard ===
On the undercard there were wins for former champion John David Jackson, welterweight contender Oba Carr and middleweight contender Keith Holmes.

=== Tucker vs. Akinwande ===
The first of the featured bouts saw former IBF heavyweight champion Tony Tucker (ranked WBA:4th, WBC:5th & IBF 11th) face unbeaten contender Henry Akinwande (ranked WBA:3rd, WBC:4th & IBF 7th).

Tucker was coming off a retirement loss to Bruce Seldon in his second attempt to regain a portion of the heavyweight title, in which he had fractured his eye socket and was hoping for a rematch.

==== The fight ====
Akinwande would get the better of Tucker, beating him to the punch, using his long left jab to control the action and landing right hand counters.

The fight went the distance and at the end of the 10 rounds two of the judges had it 97–93 and one had it 98–92 all in favour of Akinwande.

Preceded by vs. Bruce Seldon	Tony Tucker's bouts 16 December 1995	Succeeded by vs. Orlin Norris
Preceded by vs. Stanley Wright	Henry Akinwande's bouts 16 December 1995	Succeeded by vs. Brian Sargent

=== Daniels vs. Vásquez ===
Presumption of Innocence:Carl Daniels vs. Julio César Vásquez
- Title(s) on the line: WBA light middleweight title

Tale of the tape
Boxer	(United States) Carl Daniels	(Argentina) Julio César Vásquez
Nickname	"The Squirrel"	"El Zurdo"
Hometown	St. Louis, Missouri, U.S.	Santa Fe, Santa Fe Province, Argentina
Pre-fight record	35–1 (22 KO)	55–2 (38 KO)
Age	25 years, 3 months	29 years, 5 months
Height	5 ft 9 in (175 cm)	5 ft 8 in (173 cm)
Weight	153 lb (69 kg)	154 lb (70 kg)
Style	Southpaw	Southpaw
Recognition	WBA; Light Middleweight Champion	WBA; No. 1 Ranked Light Middleweight; Former light middleweight champion

Result
- Vásquez defeats Daniels by 11th round KO

The first of two light middleweight title bouts on the card saw WBA champion Carl Daniels make his first defence against former champion Julio César Vásquez. Vásquez had lost the title in March to Pernell Whitaker by a wide unanimous decision and after Whitaker vacated to remain at welterweight, Daniels won the vacant belt against Julio César Green in June.

==== The fight ====
Daniels knocked down Vásquez in the third round with an upper cut followed by a left hand. He beat the count and didn't appear badly hurt. However Daniels would largely control the first 10 rounds making use of a right jab and sharp short combinations to constantly outscore the former champion.

In the 11th round Vásquez landed a hard left hook to the chin that sent Daniels down to the canvas. Daniels struggled to his feet but fell into the ropes prompting referee Charley Sgrillo to wave it off.

At the time of the stoppage Vásquez trailed on all three scorecards 92–98 on two and 93–97 on the other.

==== Aftermath ====
Vásquez would be awarded Knockout of the Year by The Ring magazine.

Preceded by vs. Julio César Green	Carl Daniels's bouts 16 December 1995	Succeeded by vs. Tim Dendy
Preceded by vs. Carlos Martin Leturia	Julio César Vásquez's bouts 16 December 1995	Succeeded by vs. Laurent Boudouani
Awards
Preceded by Michael Moorer vs. George Foreman	The Ring Knockout of the Year; 1995	Succeeded by Wilfredo Vázquez vs. Eloy Rojas

=== Norris vs. Vaden ===
Presumption of Innocence:Terry Norris vs. Paul Vaden
- Title(s) on the line: WBC & IBF light middleweight titles

Tale of the tape
Boxer	(United States) Terry Norris	(United States) Paul Vaden
Nickname	"Terrible"	"The Ultimate"
Hometown	Lubbock, Texas, U.S.	San Diego, California, U.S.
Purse		$250,000
Pre-fight record	40–6 (25 KO)	24–0 (12 KO)
Age	28 years, 5 months	27 years, 11 months
Height	5 ft 9 in (175 cm)	6 ft 1 1/2 in (187 cm)
Weight	151 1/2 lb (69 kg)	154 lb (70 kg)
Style	Orthodox	Orthodox
Recognition	WBC; Light Middleweight Champion	IBF; Light Middleweight Champion

Result
- Norris defeats Vaden by Unanimous decision

The co featured bout saw the first ever light middleweight unification bout (and the first in any division since Michael Carbajal vs. Humberto González in 1993) between WBC champion Terry Norris and IBF champion Paul Vaden.

==== Background ====
The build up to the bout was marred by a war of words between the two men, with Norris stating that "I have no respect for Paul. He’s one of the lowest people on Earth. When I get him in the ring, I’ll try to kill him." Vaden meanwhile described Norris as "ignorant and personality-free." Neither man elaborated on the cause of their enmity with boxing insiders suggesting either a brief sparring session three years earlier or shared romantic interests in the same woman (who later became Norris' wife).

Vaden expressed confidence claiming to be in "ultra condition" Norris disagreed saying "Paul is talking about bull... I'm gonna be in his face. I don't think he can hold up for twelve rounds -- I can't stand the man"

==== The fight ====
Despite the pre fight words the bout was uneventful, with Vaden spending most of the bout fighting off the ropes catching Norris’ blows on his shoulders and gloves, with Norris forcing the action.

The bout would go the full 12 round duration and Norris would win a lopsided unanimous decision with scores of 118–110, 119–109 and 120–108.

==== Aftermath ====
Speaking after the bout Norris said "He doesn’t deserve to be a champion, I said I would kick his butt for 12 rounds and I did." Vaden did praise Norris saying "My hat goes off to him. I don’t want to take anything away from him."

Philadelphia boxing commissioner George Bochetto would state that Vaden's $250,000 purse would be withheld for "conduct unbecoming a champion".

Preceded by vs. David Gonzalez	Terry Norris's bouts 16 December 1995	Succeeded by vs. Jorge Luis Vado
Preceded by vs. Vincent Pettway	Paul Vaden's bouts 16 December 1995	Succeeded by vs. Clem Tucker Jr.

=== Main Event ===
Tyson had a slow start in the fight. In the first round, Tyson was unable to land many punches as Mathis was able to dodge most of Tyson's attempts while also staying close to Tyson to prevent Tyson from unloading his power punches. In the second round Mathis successfully continued to use his defensive strategy of slipping, bobbing and clinching to survive the round. However, with about 40 seconds left in round 3, Tyson was able to land successive right uppercuts that dropped Mathis to the canvas. Mathis was unable to answer referee Frank Cappuccino's 10 count and Tyson was awarded the victory via knockout.

== Aftermath ==
Speaking after the bout Tyson said "I know I looked good; I needed the work. He tried to lay on me and the ref wouldn't keep him off. I expected him to move more, not to smother me. But I'm an expert at that kind of fighting. That's my style of fighting."

Mathis meanwhile said "It was very close, I felt I was up. I felt very good. I was prepared. I saw the uppercut, but I slipped into it instead of stepping away."

After his victory over Mathis, Tyson's promoter officially announced that he would receive his first Heavyweight title fight since 1990 against WBC Heavyweight Champion Frank Bruno in March 1996. Tyson and Bruno had previously met in 1989 with Tyson's Undisputed Heavyweight Championship on the line. In that fight, Bruno rocked Tyson for the first time in Tyson's career with a left hook towards the end of the first round. Tyson recovered and otherwise dominated the fight before knocking Bruno out in the fifth round. In the 1996 rematch, Tyson again dominated Bruno, this time knocking him out in the third round to capture the WBC Heavyweight title.

== Undercard ==
Confirmed bouts:

Winner	Loser	Weight division/title belt(s) disputed	Result
(United States) Terry Norris	(United States) Paul Vaden	WBC & IBF World Light middleweight title	Unanimous decision
Preliminary bouts
(Argentina) Julio César Vásquez	(United States) Carl Daniels	WBA Light middleweight title	11th round TKO
(United Kingdom) Henry Akinwande	(United States) Tony Tucker	Heavyweight (10 rounds)	Unanimous decision
Non-TV bouts
(United States) John David Jackson	(United States) Guy Stanford	Super middleweight (10 rounds)	Unanimous decision
(United States) Keith Holmes	(United States) Kevin Tillman	Middleweight (6 rounds)	Unanimous decision
(United States) Oba Carr	(Mexico) Ramon Sanchez	Light middleweight (? rounds)	3rd round TKO
(United States) Tim Austin	(Mexico) Jose Luis Velarde	Bantamweight (? rounds)	1st round KO
(United States) Christy Martin	(United States) Erica Schmidlin	Light welterweight (? rounds)	1st round TKO
(United States) Rodney Moore	(United States) Robert Hightower	Light middleweight (? rounds)	1st round TKO

== Broadcasting ==
Country	Broadcaster
Canada	CFMT-DT
Mexico	Televisa
Thailand	Channel 3
United Kingdom	Sky Sports
United States	Fox

Preceded by vs. Peter McNeeley	Mike Tyson's bouts 16 December 1995	Succeeded by vs. Frank Bruno II
Preceded by vs. Mike Acklie	Buster Mathis Jr.'s bouts 16 December 1995	Succeeded by vs. Ken Smith
