= Shinji Takehara =

Japanese boxer (born 1972)

Shinji Takehara 竹原慎二
Personal information
- Born: January 25, 1972 (age 54) Hiroshima, Hiroshima, Japan
- Height: 6 ft 1 in (186cm)
- Weight: Middleweight

Boxing career
- Stance: Orthodox

Boxing record
- Total fights: 25
- Wins: 24
- Win by KO: 18
- Losses: 1

Shinji Takehara (竹原慎二, Takehara Shinji; born January 25, 1972) is a Japanese former professional boxer who competed from 1989 to 1996. He was the first Japanese boxer to capture a middleweight title having held the WBA title from 1995 to 1996.

Takehara turned pro in 1989 and had a relatively short professional career, spanning only seven years. In 1995, he landed a shot at the WBA middleweight title against Jorge Fernando Castro and won by decision. Takehara lost the belt in his only defeat during his first defense to William Joppy in a 9th-round TKO. He was overwhelmed in the first round and appeared unable to determine incoming attacks. Ringside doctors examination discovered Takehara had posterior vitreous detachment which progressed into retinal detachment and subsequently forced him into retirement.

== Childhood and early career ==
Takehara got into numerous street fights during his teens. He briefly played baseball before joining the school judo team. Takehara did not move on to high school, after graduating middle school, he moved to Tokyo in 1988 to start a boxing career. He took numerous part-time jobs while training, including working as a cleaning man at Yokohama Arena, where he would later make his first (and only) title defense of the WBA Middleweight Title.

== Professional career ==
Takehara made his debut on May 15, 1989, with a 4th-round KO victory. He went on to win the Japanese Middleweight Title in 1991, defending it three times. He won the vacant OPBF Middleweight Title in 1993, which he defended six times.

Takehara got a shot against WBA Middleweight Champion Jorge Castro, who had a record of 98-4-2 at the time and had made five title defenses. Takehara went into the fight as a huge underdog, and the match took place in the tiny Korakuen Hall despite being a world title bout. Regardless, Takehara knocked Castro down in the 3rd round, and won by unanimous decision in 12 rounds, becoming the first ever Japanese boxer to win a world middleweight title. The win against Castro generated huge media hype, and Takehara's title defense took place in Yokohama Arena on June 24, 1996, against William Joppy. Though both fighters were undefeated, Takehara was once again the underdog, and Joppy announced that he would win easily by KO. The fight was a disaster for Takehara, who was knocked down in the 1st, and lost by TKO in the 9th when the referee stopped the fight, giving up the middleweight title in half a year. Takehara himself admitted that he would have been knocked out even if the referee did not stop the fight, and Joppy remarked that he could have knocked out Takehara much earlier if he had wanted.

While preparing for his next fight, Takehara was diagnosed with a detached retina. This forced him to retire from boxing at only 24 years of age. His record was 24-1-0 (18KOs).

== Professional boxing record ==
25 fights	24 wins	1 loss
By knockout	18	1
By decision	6	0

No.	Result	Record	Opponent	Type	Round, time	Date	Location	Notes
25	Loss	24–1	William Joppy	TKO	9 (12), 2:29	1996–06–24	Arena, Yokohama, Japan	Lost WBA middleweight title
24	Win	24–0	Jorge Castro	UD	12	1995–12–19	Korakuen Hall, Tokyo, Japan	Won WBA middleweight title
23	Win	23–0	Lee Shung-Chun	PTS	12	1995–09–12	Japan	Retained OPBF middleweight title
22	Win	22–0	Park Young-Ki	KO	1 (12)	1995–04–17	Japan	Retained OPBF middleweight title
21	Win	21–0	Craig Trotter	KO	7 (12)	1994–12–19	Japan	Retained OPBF middleweight title
20	Win	20–0	Lee Hyun-Sik	PTS	12	1994–09–18	Yoyogi National Gymnasium, Tokyo, Japan	Retained OPBF middleweight title
19	Win	19–0	Alex Tui	KO	7 (12)	1994–06–12	Hiroshima, Japan	Retained OPBF middleweight title
18	Win	18–0	Noli de Guia	KO	1 (?)	1994–02–21	Japan	
17	Win	17–0	Nico Toriri	KO	6 (12)	1993–11–22	Japan	Retained OPBF middleweight title
16	Win	16–0	Lee Sung-Chun	KO	12 (12), 2:38	1993–05–24	Japan	Won vacant OPBF middleweight title
15	Win	15–0	Satoshi Yokozaki	KO	5 (10)	1993–02–15	Japan	Retained Japanese middleweight title
14	Win	14–0	Biney Martin	UD	10	1992–08–17	Japan	Retained Japanese middleweight title
13	Win	13–0	Yoshinori Nishizawa	PTS	10	1992–05–17	Hiroshima, Japan	Retained Japanese middleweight title
12	Win	12–0	Hisashi Teraji	KO	2 (10), 2:47	1992–02–17	Japan	Retained Japanese middleweight title
11	Win	11–0	Takehito Saijo	KO	7 (10)	1991–10–28	Japan	Won Japanese middleweight title
10	Win	10–0	Jiro Kashiwara	KO	4 (?)	1991–07–15	Japan	
9	Win	9–0	Tomo Suzuki	KO	1 (?)	1991–02–18	Japan	
8	Win	8–0	Park Keon-Soo	KO	1 (?)	1990–11–26	Korakuen Hall, Tokyo, Japan	
7	Win	7–0	Satoshi Yokozaki	KO	10 (10)	1990–07–30	Japan	
6	Win	6–0	Haruhisa Tokuda	KO	2 (?)	1990–02–18	Osaka, Japan	
5	Win	5–0	Biney Martin	PTS	6	1989–12–23	Japan	
4	Win	4–0	Yoshihiro Kitada	KO	1 (?)	1989–11–10	Japan	
3	Win	3–0	Kiyoshi Hirayama	KO	1 (?)	1989–09–18	Japan	
2	Win	2–0	Kiyoshi Hirayama	KO	2 (?)	1989–07–17	Japan	
1	Win	1–0	Masao Tadano	KO	4 (?)	1989–05–15	Korakuen Hall, Tokyo, Japan	

== Legacy ==
Winning a world middleweight title had been regarded as impossible for any Japanese boxer, since the division had featured some of the sports best champions, including Sugar Ray Leonard, Roberto Durán, Marvin Hagler, and Thomas Hearns. Though Takehara lost in his first defense, William Joppy remained a top middleweight contender for more than seven years after beating Takehara. Joppy remarked before his fight against Félix Trinidad that Takehara punched the hardest of any of the fighters he had faced. Takehara is now known more for his success after retiring from boxing, but his short career has left an important legacy on Japanese boxing.

== Post-retirement ==
Few people knew Takehara as a former world champion, and he had to rely on part-time jobs to maintain a living. After years of mediocre living, Takehara achieved immense popularity in 2000 after appearing on the variety show "Gachinko Fight Club." The show is similar to The Contender in concept, where the lives of aspiring boxers are documented as they go through hard training and life struggles. The show produced 12 professional boxers during its three-year run, and Takehara's role as the tough but fair-minded trainer was central to the show's success, allowing Takehara to pursue further opportunities in the television business. Since then, he has appeared on numerous variety and talk shows, and has even guest-starred in a TV drama series and released a rap CD. Takehara's blog and column in the Yahoo! Japan web magazine enjoy great popularity. IN 2014 he was diagnosed with bladder cancer and underwent treatment that left him in remission since 2015.

== See also ==
- Boxing in Japan
- List of Japanese boxing world champions
- List of world middleweight boxing champions

Sporting positions
Regional boxing titles
Preceded by Takehito Saijo	Japanese middleweight champion October 28, 1991 – 1993; Vacated	Vacant Title next held by Biney Martin
Vacant Title last held by Ki Yun Song	OPBF middleweight champion May 24, 1993 – 1996; Vacated	Vacant Title next held by Jong Mo Kim
World boxing titles
Preceded by Jorge Castro	WBA middleweight champion December 19, 1995 – June 24, 1996	Succeeded by William Joppy
