= Mike Tyson vs. Peter McNeeley =

Boxing competition

He's Back
- Date: August 19, 1995
- Venue: MGM Grand Las Vegas, Paradise, Nevada, U.S.

Tale of the tape
Boxer	Mike Tyson	Peter McNeeley
Nickname	Iron	Hurricane
Hometown	Catskill, New York, U.S.	Medfield, Massachusetts, U.S.
Purse	$25,000,000	$400,000
Pre-fight record	41–1 (36 KO)	36–1 (30 KO)
Age	29 years, 1 month	26 years, 10 months
Height	5 ft 10 in (178 cm)	6 ft 2 in (188 cm)
Weight	220 lb (100 kg)	224 lb (102 kg)
Style	Orthodox	Orthodox
Recognition	WBA/WBC; No. 1 Ranked Heavyweight; Former undisputed heavyweight champion	WBA; No. 7 Ranked Heavyweight; WBC; No. 10 Ranked Heavyweight

Result
- Tyson wins via 1st-round disqualification

Mike Tyson vs. Peter McNeeley, billed as He's Back, was a professional boxing match contested on August 19, 1995. The match marked the return of Mike Tyson to professional boxing after over four years away due to his 1991 arrest and subsequent conviction for rape in 1992 which led to Tyson serving three years in prison.

== Background ==
Tyson had twice defeated the number two ranked heavyweight, Donovan "Razor" Ruddock, in 1991. Shortly after his second victory over Ruddock, a blockbuster deal was made that would see Tyson face the Undisputed Heavyweight Champion Evander Holyfield on November 8, 1991. Before this match could take place, however, Tyson was arrested for the rape of 18-year-old Desiree Washington. He was subsequently convicted on February 10, 1992, and then sentenced to six years in prison on March 26. After serving three years, Tyson was paroled on March 25, 1995, and on March 29, he would hold a short press conference that would announce his return to boxing as well as that Don King would remain his promoter. After much debate over who would be Tyson's first opponent in his comeback, including talks about a potential superfight with George Foreman, it was announced that Tyson would face little-known Peter McNeeley on August 19, 1995.

== Fight details ==
The fight lasted only 89 seconds with Tyson earning an easy victory via disqualification. McNeeley started the fight by aggressively attacking Tyson as soon as the opening bell rang. Tyson was able to avoid McNeeley's wild punches and land a straight right that dropped McNeeley to the canvas less than 10 seconds into the fight. After taking referee Mills Lane's standing eight count, McNeeley was allowed to continue and again continued his assault on Tyson. The two men exchanged punches in the corner as the first minute of the round passed. Less than 20 seconds later, Tyson landed a right uppercut that again sent McNeeley down. With McNeeley clearly hurt from the exchange, his manager Vinnie Vecchione entered the ring to prevent McNeeley from taking any more damage, causing Lane to end the fight and award Tyson the victory by disqualification.

== Aftermath ==
Highly anticipated, the fight was an overwhelming financial success, grossing $96 million worldwide, including a then-record $63 million in pay-per-view buys with the fight being purchased by 1.52 million American homes. Tyson later eclipsed this figure with three fights; two in 1996, his rematch with Frank Bruno and a match with Evander Holyfield and then the subsequent 1997 rematch between Tyson and Holyfield.

== Undercard ==
Confirmed bouts:

Weight Class	Weight		vs.		Method	Round	Notes
Heavyweight	200+ lbs.	Mike Tyson	def.	Peter McNeeley	DQ	1/10
Middleweight	160 lbs.	Quincy Taylor	def.	Julian Jackson (c)	TKO	6/12	^{Note 1}
Heavyweight	200+ lbs.	Bruce Seldon (c)	def.	Joe Hipp	TKO	10/12	^{Note 2}
Super Welterweight	154 lbs.	Miguel Ángel González (c)	def.	Lamar Murphy	MD	12/12	^{Note 3}
Light Middleweight	154 lbs.	Terry Norris	def.	Luis Santana (c)	TKO	2/12	^{Note 4}
Middleweight	160 lbs.	Keith Holmes	def.	Tommy Small	TKO	4/10
Featherweight	126 lbs.	Jose Badillo	def.	Fernando Sanchez	UD	8
Super Middleweight	168 lbs.	Tim Dendy	def.	Lennard Jackson	UD	6

^Note 1 For WBO Middleweight title
^Note 2 For WBA Heavyweight title
^Note 3 For WBC Lightweight title
^Note 4 For WBC Light Middleweight title

== Broadcasting ==
Country	Broadcaster
Mexico	Televisa
Thailand	Channel 3
United States	Showtime

Preceded by vs. Donovan Ruddock II	Mike Tyson's bouts 19 August 1995	Succeeded by vs. Buster Mathis Jr.
Preceded by vs. Frankie Hines	Peter McNeeley's bouts 19 August 1995	Succeeded by vs. Mike Sams
