= Fred Moore (boxer) =

American boxer

Fred Moore, alias Fabulous (born February 26, 1967), is a light heavyweight professional boxer from Minnesota.

== Personal life ==
Moore was born in Philadelphia, Pennsylvania, but now makes his home in Rochester, Minnesota. He has 2 daughters, Shaniqua, 19, Arnella, 14.

== Professional career ==
Moore debuted in November 1994 and won the first 25 fights of his career before dropping a fight by TKO to Quincy Taylor in June 2001. In his career, Moore has fought Kenny Bowman, Quincy Taylor, Reggie Johnson, and Glen Johnson, among others. As of October 2007, Moore's professional record was 30 wins (27 by knockout) and 7 losses.

Fred Moore grew up in the Scotland School for Veterans' Children in Scotland, PA where he earned the title of the best fighter in the school.

== Professional boxing record ==
30 Wins (27 knockouts, 3 decisions), 8 Losses (7 knockouts, 1 decision)
Result	Record	Opponent	Type	Round	Date	Location	Notes
Loss	49-11-1	(United States) Carl Daniels	TKO	6	15/12/2007	(United States) Grand Casino, Hinckley, Minnesota	Referee stopped the bout at 2:46 of the sixth round.
Loss	45-11-2	(Jamaica) Glen "Road Warrior" Johnson	KO	5	27/07/2007	(United States) Sheraton Miami Mart Hotel, Miami, Florida	Moore knocked out at 2:45 of the fifth round.
Loss	42-6	(Togo) Jaffa Ballogou	KO	4	11/11/2005	(United States) Horseshoe Bossier City, Bossier City, Louisiana	Moore knocked out at 2:50 of the fourth round.
Loss	42-7-1	(United States) "Sweet" Reggie Johnson	KO	9	27/08/2005	(United States) Paragon Casino Resort, Marksville, Louisiana	Moore knocked out at 2:59 of the ninth round.
Loss	22-2-1	(United States) George Khalid Jones	TD	9	01/07/2005	(United States) Memorial Hall, Plymouth, Massachusetts	IBF USBA Light Heavyweight Title. 83-88, 88-83, 83-88. Bout stopped at the end of the ninth round.
Win	16-1-1	(Uganda) James Lubwama	UD	10	22/10/2004	(United States) Municipal Auditorium-Recreation Club, Sarasota, Florida	NBA World Light Heavyweight Title.
Loss	20-2-1	(United States) Prince Badi Ajamu	TKO	10	27/07/2004	(United States) A La Carte Event Pavilion, Tampa, Florida	Referee stopped the bout at 0:33 of the tenth round.
Loss	16-0	(Brazil) Laudelino Jose Barros	KO	5	09/08/2003	(United States) Miami Arena, Miami, Florida	WBA Fedelatin Light Heavyweight Title. Moore knocked out at 2:06 of the fifth round.
Win	6-12-2	(United States) Kwan Manassah	TKO	3	16/06/2002	(United States) Treasure Island Casino, Red Wing, Minnesota	
Win	6-5-2	(United States) Kwan Manassah	TKO	5	07/09/2001	(United States) Dakota Magic Casino, Hankinson, North Dakota	Referee stopped the bout at 1:32 of the fifth round.
Win	5-5	(United States) Mark Longo	TKO	5	25/08/2001	(United States) 4 Bears Casino & Lodge, New Town, North Dakota	Referee stopped the bout at 0:33 of the fifth round.
Win	18-13-3	(United States) Patrick Swann	TKO	6	28/07/2001	(United States) Rochester, Minnesota	Referee stopped the bout at 2:27 of the sixth round.
Loss	27-4	(United States) Quincy Taylor	TKO	4	16/06/2001	(United States) Treasure Island Casino, Red Wing, Minnesota	
Win	24-23-3	(Mexico) Nino Cirilo	TKO	3	01/06/2001	(United States) Bismarck Civic Center, Bismarck, North Dakota	
Win	22-17-3	(United States) Allen Smith	TKO	3	30/03/2001	(United States) Tama, Iowa	
Win	5-1-2	(United States) Kwan Manassah	TKO	5	01/12/2000	(United States) Minnesota	
Win	24-20-3	(Mexico) Nino Cirilo	TKO	5	21/07/2000	(United States) Minot, North Dakota	
Win	17-4-2	(United States) Donnie Giron	TKO	4	07/10/1999	(United States) Graham Arena, Rochester, Minnesota	
Win	30-2	(United States) Kenny Bowman	KO	4	24/07/1999	(United States) Shooting Star Casino, Mahnomen, Minnesota	
Win	19-14-3	(United States) Allen Smith	TKO	2	19/06/1999	(United States) Cuzzy's Bar, Minneapolis, Minnesota	
Win	28-11-1	(United States) Carlos Bates	KO	2	22/05/1999	(United States) Hyatt Regency Hotel, Minneapolis, Minnesota	
Win	6-0	(United States) Billy James Johnson	TKO	1	10/04/1999	(United States) Mandan Community Center, Mandan, North Dakota	Referee stopped the bout at 1:31 of the first round.
Win	9-5-1	(United States) Laverne Clark	KO	4	01/10/1998	(United States) Rochester, Minnesota	
Win	0-2	(United States) Anthony Wright	KO	1	18/07/1998	(United States) New Town, North Dakota	
Win	11-16-2	(United States) John Kiser	PTS	8	04/10/1997	(United States) Rochester, Minnesota	
Win	2-5-1	(United States) Nathaniel Miles	TKO	7	13/09/1997	(United States) Mandan, North Dakota	
Win	2-0	(United States) Jorge Manjarrez	TKO	1	23/07/1997	(United States) Maplewood, Minnesota	
Win	1-2-1	(United States) Richie Galvan	TKO	3	28/03/1997	(United States) Rochester, Minnesota	
Win	5-0	(United States) Quinton Osgood	TKO	2	10/10/1996	(United States) Rochester, Minnesota	
Win	5-40	(United States) Donnie Penelton	PTS	6	24/08/1996	(United States) New Town, North Dakota	
Win	--	(Canada) Wayne Chartrand	KO	1	23/07/1996	(United States) Saint Paul, Minnesota	
Win	2-22-2	(United States) Gary Jones	KO	3	20/04/1996	(United States) Engelstad Arena, Grand Forks, North Dakota	
Win	0-1	(United States) Keith Smith	TKO	1	02/03/1996	(United States) Minneapolis, Minnesota	
Win	6-24-1	(United States) Duane Smith	TKO	2	21/02/1996	(United States) Columbia Club, Indianapolis, Indiana	
Win	2-6	(United States) David Willis	TKO	1	16/01/1996	(United States) Little Bit of Texas, Indianapolis, Indiana	
Win	0-2-1	(United States) Jim Hendrickson	KO	2	16/12/1995	(United States) Grand Forks Civic Auditorium, Grand Forks, North Dakota	
Win	2-3	(United States) David Willis	TKO	2	14/07/1995	(United States) Rochester, Minnesota	
Win	--	Paul Phonseya	KO	2	18/11/1994	(United States) Rochester, Minnesota	
