= Frank Bruno vs. Mike Tyson II =

Boxing competition

The Championship: Part I
- Date: March 16, 1996
- Venue: MGM Grand Garden Arena, Paradise, Nevada, US
- Title(s) on the line: WBC heavyweight title

Tale of the tape
Boxer	Frank Bruno	Mike Tyson
Nickname		Iron
Hometown	London, England	Catskill, New York, U.S.
Purse	$6,000,000	$30,000,000
Pre-fight record	40–4 (38 KO)	43–1 (37 KO)
Age	34 years, 4 months	29 years, 8 months
Height	6 ft 3 in (191 cm)	5 ft 10 in (178 cm)
Weight	247 lb (112 kg)	220 lb (100 kg)
Style	Orthodox	Orthodox
Recognition	WBC; Heavyweight Champion; The Ring; No. 7 Ranked Heavyweight	WBA/WBC/IBF; No. 1 Ranked Heavyweight; The Ring; No. 3 Ranked Heavyweight; Former undisputed heavyweight champion

Result
- Tyson wins via 3rd-round TKO

Frank Bruno vs. Mike Tyson II, billed as The Championship: Part I, was a professional boxing match contested on March 16, 1996, for the WBC heavyweight championship.

== Background ==
Frank Bruno, at that time, had been a professional boxer for over thirteen years. He was a former European heavyweight champion and had received several shots at the world heavyweight title over the course of his career. The first came in 1986, when he was knocked out by Tim Witherspoon in a bout for his WBA title. He fought Mike Tyson in 1989 for his undisputed world championship but was knocked out in the fifth round. After fighting Lennox Lewis for his WBC title in Cardiff Arms Park in 1993 and losing, Bruno would have to wait two years for another title shot. He fought Oliver McCall, who defeated Lewis in an upset in 1994 for the WBC title, on September 2, 1995, in London. McCall had claimed he was going to get revenge on the English through Bruno after Gerald McClellan suffered permanent brain damage in a title fight against Nigel Benn in February that year, but Bruno outboxed McCall to win his first world championship.

Tyson was released from prison on parole in 1995 after he was convicted of raping Desiree Washington in 1991. He had fought two fights since his release, beating Peter McNeeley by disqualification in his pay-per-view return and knocking out Buster Mathis, Jr. in a nationally televised bout on Fox. After the victory against Mathis, Tyson was placed ahead of Lewis in the line of contenders for the WBC title and his promoter Don King, who also promoted Oliver McCall, drew up a contract where McCall would defend his title against Bruno and the winner of the fight would be forced to defend the belt against Tyson in their first defense.

== The fights ==
=== Hopkins vs. Lipsey ===
In the first title bout on the card IBF middleweight champion Bernard Hopkins (The Ring:2nd) faced top ranked contender Joe Lipsey (The Ring:8th).

Hopkins would dominate the bout, before stunning Lipsey with an uppercut late in the fourth round, following up with a barrage of punches which send him down to the canvas and seemingly out cold. Referee Mitch Halpern would immediately wave it off giving Hopkins a KO victory.

Unlike the rest of the card, this bout was broadcast on ABC.

Preceded by vs. Steve Frank	Bernard Hopkins's bouts March 16, 1996	Succeeded by vs. William Bo James
Preceded by vs. James Gatlin	Joe Lipsey's bouts March 16, 1996	Retired

=== Taylor vs. Holmes ===
The second title bout saw Quincy Taylor (The Ring:1st) make the first defence of his WBC middleweight title against No. 9 ranked Keith Holmes (The Ring:9th Light Middleweight).

The first eight rounds were largely tactical with Holmes ahead by two points on two of the scorecard and by one on the third going into the ninth. Just before the halfway point of the round Holmes landed a counter right that dropped the champion. Taylor beat the count but was unable to answer a string of Holmes' punches to his head prompting Richard Steele to wave it off.

=== Carbajal vs. Castro ===
The PPV event began with former unified light flyweight champion Michael Carbajal facing former WBC champion Melchor Cob Castro for the vacant IBF belt.

Despite appearing unimpressive against the awkward Castro, Carbajal would be awarded a unanimous decision victory by the judges, with scores of 115–113, 117–111 and 116–112. The Associated Press scored it 115–114 for Castro.

=== Martin vs. Gogarty ===
The only non-title bout on the PPV card saw Christy Martin face Deirdre Gogarty.

It was an action-packed contest that went on for six rounds. Martin stunned and floored Gogarty with a straight right 30 seconds into the second round. Gogarty got up and kept fighting, Martin sought to end the match then and there by cornering her with a barrage of blows, but Gogarty caught Martin on the nose, which started bleeding, and later turned out to be broken. Despite the bloody nose, Martin was still the aggressor, unleashing massive combinations in the fourth round, while Gogarty continued to fight back and kept her feet moving. In the fifth round, Gogarty landed a straight right on Martin, engaging her in a brutal exchange against the ropes, but Martin fought back and pushed herself to the center of the ring. The sixth and final round continued similarly, with Martin throwing lefts and rights up until the bell, as the crowd cheered, and the on-air announcer praised both boxers' "brilliant" heart.

The fight went the scorecards with two cards reading 60–53 and one card of 59-54 all in favour of Martin.

The match was well received and has been described retroactively as the bout "put women's boxing on the map".

On April 15 Martin became the first female boxer to appear on the cover of Sports Illustrated; the headline read, "The Lady Is a Champ".

=== López vs. Villamor ===
The final bout on the undercard saw WBC strawweight champion Ricardo López (P4P:6th) defend his title against No. 1 ranked Ala Villamor.

López would largely dominate the bout. Early in the eighth round a left uppercut from López sent the challenger down flat on his back where he remained at the count of ten giving López a KO victory.

=== Main Event ===
Mike Tyson was the aggressor for the entire fight. In round 1, Tyson continuously attacked Bruno with right overhand punches, forcing Bruno to grapple with Tyson several times in the round in order to weather the storm. In the final 30 seconds of the round, the two men would go toe-to-toe with Tyson connecting with a power right hand that staggered Bruno. Bruno would regain his composure and exchange punches with Tyson until the bell sounded. During their first round exchange, Bruno would receive a cut over his left eye. Tyson would continue to attack Bruno in round 2, with Bruno again grappling with Tyson at a frequent basis in an effort to slow Tyson down. Less than a minute into the third round, Tyson dodged a Bruno jab and proceeded to unleash a 13-punch combination that caused referee Mills Lane to stop the fight and award Tyson the victory via technical knockout.

== Aftermath ==
The match would prove to be the final one of Frank Bruno's career. Though he initially talked about a potential third fight with Tyson, he was advised by doctors that he risked losing vision in one eye if he continued to fight and subsequently announced his retirement from the ring shortly thereafter.

Mike Tyson would next set his sights on the WBA Heavyweight champion Bruce Seldon. However, Tyson's contract stated that he would first have to defend the WBC Heavyweight title against number one contender Lennox Lewis. Don King eventually paid Lewis $4 million to step aside and let Tyson face Seldon on the condition that Lewis would get his WBC title shot after. Tyson would then go on to defeat Seldon by 1st-round knockout to capture the WBA Heavyweight title.

== Undercard ==
Confirmed bouts:

Winner	Loser	Weight division/title belt(s) disputed	Result
(Mexico) Ricardo López	(Philippines) Ala Villamor	WBC World Strawweight title	8th round KO.
(United States) Christy Martin	(Republic of Ireland) Deirdre Gogarty	Lightweight (6 rounds)	Unanimous decision
(United States) Michael Carbajal	(Mexico) Melchor Cob Castro	vacant IBF Light flyweight title	Unanimous decision
Preliminary bouts
(United States) Keith Holmes	(United States) Quincy Taylor	WBC World Middleweight title	9th round TKO.
(United States) Bernard Hopkins	(United States) Joe Lipsey	IBF World Middleweight title	4th round KO
Non-TV bouts
(Mexico) Miguel Ángel González	(Mexico) Ramon Marchena	Welterweight (8 rounds)	Unanimous decision

== Broadcasting ==
Country	Broadcaster
Canada	TSN
France	Canal+
United Kingdom	Sky Sports
United States	Showtime
Thailand	Channel 3

Preceded by vs. Oliver McCall	Frank Bruno's bouts March 16, 1996	Retired
Preceded by vs. Buster Mathis	Mike Tyson's bouts March 16, 1996	Succeeded by vs. Bruce Seldon
