= Quincy Taylor =

American boxer

Personal information
- Born: Quincy Lee Taylor; July 18, 1963 (age 63) Dallas, Texas, U.S.
- Height: 5 ft 9 1/2 in (177 cm)
- Weight: Middleweight

Boxing career
- Reach: 73 in (185 cm)
- Stance: Southpaw

Boxing record
- Total fights: 32
- Wins: 28
- Win by KO: 24
- Losses: 4

Quincy Lee Taylor (born July 18, 1963) is an American former professional boxer who competed between 1986 and 2001. He held the WBC middleweight title from 1995 to 1996.

== Professional career ==
Taylor, a southpaw, turned pro in 1986. In 1987, he nearly KO´d Sugar Ray Leonard whilst sparring in preparation for Leonard's match against Marvin Hagler and which in Sugar Ray Leonards biography he gives credit to Quincy Taylor for helping him prepare for that fight.

In 1994, he landed a shot at WBC middleweight champion Julian Jackson. Taylor scored an upset TKO victory over Jackson, but lost the title in a forced mandatory title defense in his next fight and coming off knee surgery which was not fully recovered to Keith Holmes.

After a two-year layoff and a victory in 1998, followed by a three-year layoff and a victory in 2001, Taylor retired from boxing. He coaches amateur boxers at the Boys and Girls Club and trains along with them.

== Professional boxing record ==
32 fights	28 wins	4 losses
By knockout	24	1
By decision	4	3

No.	Result	Record	Opponent	Type	Round, time	Date	Age	Location	Notes
32	Win	28–4	Fred Moore	TKO	4 (10)	Jun 16, 2001	37 years, 333 days	Treasure Island Resort & Casino, Red Wing, Minnesota, U.S.	
31	Win	27–4	Melvin Wynn	KO	2 (10), 1:43	Apr 11, 1998	34 years, 241 days	Township Auditorium, Columbia, South Carolina, U.S.	
30	Loss	26–4	Keith Holmes	TKO	9 (12), 1:43	Mar 16, 1996	32 years, 242 days	MGM Grand Garden Arena, Las Vegas, Nevada, U.S.	Lost WBC middleweight title
29	Win	26–3	Julian Jackson	TKO	6 (12), 2:23	Aug 19, 1995	32 years, 32 days	MGM Grand Garden Arena, Las Vegas, Nevada, U.S.	Won WBC middleweight title
28	Win	25–3	Rafael Williams	TKO	7 (12)	May 3, 1995	31 years, 289 days	Dallas, Texas, U.S.	Retained NABF middleweight title
27	Win	24–3	Rodney Toney	TKO	12 (12), 1:26	Jan 3, 1995	31 years, 169 days	Aladdin Hotel & Casino, Las Vegas, Nevada, U.S.	Retained NABF middleweight title
26	Win	23–3	Derrick Rolon	TKO	8 (12), 2:38	Aug 18, 1994	31 years, 31 days	Foxwoods Resort Casino, Mashantucket, Connecticut, U.S.	Retained NABF middleweight title
25	Win	22–3	Otis Grant	KO	12 (12), 2:38	Mar 15, 1994	30 years, 240 days	The Roxy, Boston, Massachusetts, U.S.	Won NABF middleweight title
24	Win	21–3	Eric Martin	UD	10	Jun 25, 1993	29 years, 342 days	Red Lion Inn, SeaTac, Washington, U.S.	
23	Win	20–3	James Rivas	TKO	2 (10)	Apr 24, 1993	29 years, 280 days	Bellevue Community College, Bellevue, Washington, U.S.	
22	Win	19–3	Robert Britt	KO	1 (?)	Mar 27, 1993	29 years, 252 days	Edmonds Community College, Lynnwood, Washington, U.S.	
21	Win	18–3	Martin Quiroz	TKO	5 (10)	Mar 5, 1993	29 years, 230 days	Rocket Fiesta Palace, Dallas, Texas, U.S.	
20	Win	17–3	Anthony Campbell	KO	2 (?)	Oct 2, 1992	29 years, 76 days	Central Plaza Hotel, Oklahoma City, Oklahoma, U.S.	
19	Win	16–3	Tommy Jeans	TKO	2 (6)	Jul 23, 1992	29 years, 5 days	Rock City Cafe, Oklahoma City, Oklahoma, U.S.	
18	Loss	15–3	Jorge Vaca	UD	10	May 6, 1991	27 years, 292 days	Great Western Forum, Inglewood, California, U.S.	
17	Win	15–2	Armando Rodriguez	TKO	7 (12), 1:53	Dec 13, 1990	27 years, 148 days	Rosemont Horizon, Rosemont, Illinois, U.S.	
16	Loss	14–2	Jorge Vaca	TD	6 (10), 1:53	Oct 8, 1990	27 years, 82 days	Great Western Forum, Inglewood, California, U.S.	
15	Win	14–1	Mario Gaston	TKO	7 (12), 0:45	Jul 9, 1990	26 years, 356 days	Great Western Forum, Inglewood, California, U.S.	
14	Win	13–1	Tomas Perez	UD	10	Mar 26, 1990	26 years, 251 days	Great Western Forum, Inglewood, California, U.S.	
13	Win	12–1	Gilbert Baptist	UD	10	Feb 26, 1990	26 years, 223 days	Great Western Forum, Inglewood, California, U.S.	
12	Win	11–1	Donald Johnson	TKO	7 (8)	Feb 21, 1989	25 years, 218 days	Resorts International, Atlantic City, New Jersey, U.S.	
11	Loss	10–1	Terry Norris	UD	10	Aug 12, 1988	25 years, 25 days	Caesars Palace, Las Vegas, Nevada, U.S.	
10	Win	10–0	Tim Knight	KO	2 (8), 0:45	Jul 28, 1988	25 years, 10 days	Felt Forum, New York City, New York, U.S.	
9	Win	9–0	Roy Bedwell	TKO	2 (8), 2:22	Apr 14, 1988	24 years, 271 days	Felt Forum, New York City, New York, U.S.	
8	Win	8–0	Malcolm Shaw	KO	1 (6), 1:20	Jan 8, 1988	24 years, 174 days	Bally's Las Vegas, Las Vegas, Nevada, U.S.	
7	Win	7–0	Joe Walker	TKO	2 (6), 2:40	Dec 16, 1987	24 years, 151 days	Showboat Hotel and Casino, Sports Pavilion, Las Vegas, Nevada, U.S.	
6	Win	6–0	Mario Davis	UD	6	Nov 11, 1987	24 years, 116 days	Resorts Casino Hotel, Atlantic City, New Jersey, U.S.	
5	Win	5–0	Carl Owens	KO	1 (6)	Oct 18, 1987	24 years, 92 days	Caesars Tahoe, Cascade Showroom, Stateline, Nevada, U.S.	
4	Win	4–0	Bill Robinson	KO	1 (6), 2:25	Sep 17, 1987	24 years, 61 days	Felt Forum, New York City, New York, U.S.	
3	Win	3–0	Maurice Daugherty	KO	4 (4)	Nov 11, 1986	23 years, 116 days	Gorman's Super Pro Gym, Fort Worth, Texas, U.S.	
2	Win	2–0	Mike Williams	KO	1 (?)	Oct 21, 1986	23 years, 95 days	Longhorn Ballroom, Dallas, Texas, U.S.	
1	Win	1–0	John Robinson	RTD	3 (4), 3:00	Aug 13, 1986	23 years, 26 days	Forum, Inglewood, California, U.S.	

== See also ==
- List of world middleweight boxing champions

Sporting positions
Regional boxing titles
Preceded by Otis Grant	WBC-NABF middleweight champion March 15, 1994 – August 19, 1995; Won world title	Vacant Title next held by Otis Grant
World boxing titles
Preceded by Julian Jackson	WBC middleweight champion August 19, 1995 – March 16, 1996	Succeeded by Keith Holmes
