= Hacine Cherifi =

French boxer

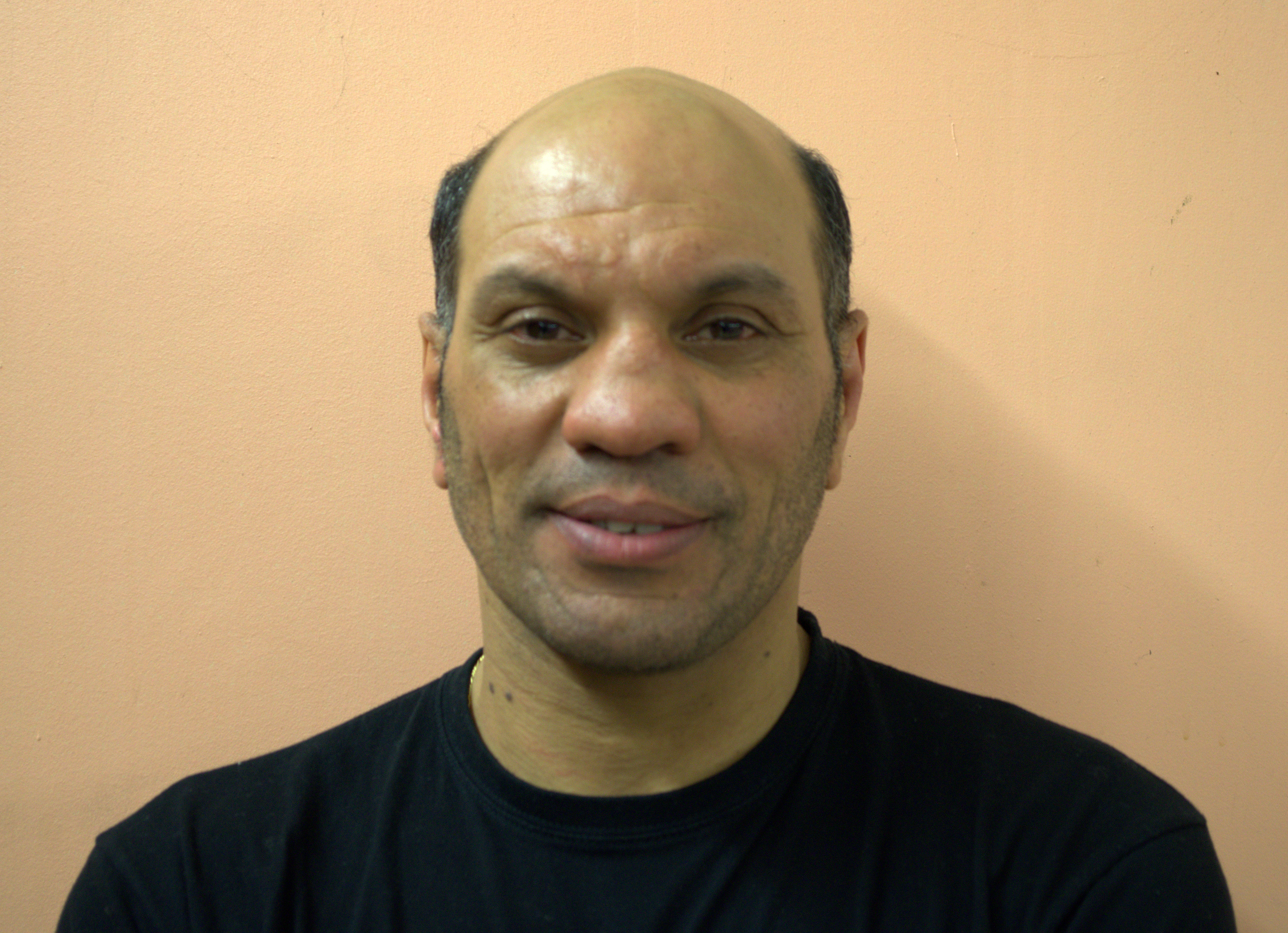
- Hacine Cherifi (2014).

Personal information
- Nationality: French
- Born: Billy; 12 December 1967 (age 58) Lyon, France
- Height: 5 ft 11 in (180 cm)
- Weight: Middleweight

Boxing career
- Stance: Orthodox

Boxing record
- Total fights: 49
- Wins: 36
- Win by KO: 20
- Losses: 12
- Draws: 1

Hacine "Billy" Cherifi (born 12 December 1967) is a French former professional boxer who competed from 1985 to 2005. He held the WBC middleweight title in 1998. He made two other attempts at world titles; the WBC super middleweight title in 1997 and the WBA middleweight title in 2000. At regional level, he twice held the French middleweight title, firstly from 1995 to 1996 and again from 2002 to 2003. He also held the EBU European middleweight title from 1996 to 1997.

== Professional career ==
Cherifi, known as "Billy", began his pro career in 1989 and challenged for the WBC super middleweight title in 1997 against Robin Reid, losing split decision. After the loss, he dropped down in weight and took on WBC middleweight champion, Keith Holmes, winning a decision, although he was dropped in the ninth round. In 1999, he lost the belt in his first defense to Holmes in a rematch via seventh-round knockout.

=== Cherifi vs. Joppy ===
In 2000 he got a shot at WBA middleweight champion William Joppy. Cherifi was dominated and knocked down in Rounds 8 and 9, and lost by decision.

=== Cherifi vs. Trinidad ===
In 2002 he would face Felix Trinidad. Cherifi was stopped in the fourth round.

== Professional boxing record ==
49 fights	36 wins	12 losses
By knockout	20	7
By decision	15	5
By disqualification	1	0
Draws	1	

No.	Result	Record	Opponent	Type	Round, time	Date	Location	Notes
49	Loss	36–12–1	Rudy Markussen	TKO	1 (8)	2005-06-17	SAS Radisson, Aarhus, Denmark	
48	Win	36–11–1	Michel Noto	PTS	8 (8)	2005-03-25	Salle Jean Roure, Les Pennes-Mirabeau, France	
47	Loss	35–11–1	Felix Sturm	KO	3 (8)	2004-12-04	Estrel Convention Center, Berlin-Neukölln, Germany	
46	Win	35–10–1	Paul Sextius	PTS	8 (8)	2004-11-19	Palais des Sports, Marseille, France	
45	Loss	34–10–1	Franck Mezaache	UD	10 (10)	2004-02-24	La Halle, Martigues, France	Lost French middleweight title
44	Loss	34–9–1	Brian Magee	TKO	8 (12)	2003-11-22	King's Hall, Belfast, Northern Ireland, U.K.	For IBO super middleweight title
43	Loss	34–8–1	Howard Eastman	RTD	8 (12)	2003-07-25	Sports Village, Norwich, England, U.K.	For EBU middleweight title
42	Win	34–7–1	Didier Nkuku Mupeko	UD	10 (10)	2003-05-20	Lyon, France	Retained French middleweight title
41	Win	33–7–1	Christophe Tendil	UD	10 (10)	2002-10-15	Andrézieux-Bouthéon, France	Won French middleweight title
40	Loss	32–7–1	Félix Trinidad	TKO	4 (10)	2002-05-11	Roberto Clemente Coliseum, San Juan, Puerto Rico	
39	Loss	32–6–1	Harry Simon	UD	12 (12)	2001-07-21	Coliseo Rubén Rodríguez, Bayamon, Puerto Rico	For Interim WBO middleweight title
38	Win	32–5–1	Silvio Walter Rojas	TKO	7 (10)	2001-06-08	Lyon, France	
37	Win	31–5–1	Lóránt Szabó	PTS	8 (8)	2000-12-09	Astroballe, Villeurbanne, France	
36	Loss	30–5–1	William Joppy	UD	12 (12)	2000-09-16	MGM Grand Garden Arena, Las Vegas, Nevada, U.S.	For WBA middleweight title
35	Win	30–4–1	Alex Lubo	KO	1 (8)	2000-04-08	Palais Omnisport de Paris-Bercy, Paris, France	
34	Win	29–4–1	Viktor Fesechko	UD	8 (8)	2000-02-15	Palais des Sports, Epinal, France	
33	Win	28–4–1	Mohamed Boualleg	TKO	4 (8)	1999-12-19	Salle Leyrit, Nice, France	
32	Win	27–4–1	Jorge Sclarandi	DQ	7 (8)	1999-06-18	Lyon, France	
31	Loss	26–4–1	Keith Holmes	TKO	7 (12)	1999-04-24	MCI Center, Washington, D.C., U.S.	Lost WBC middleweight title
30	Win	26–3–1	Anthony Ivory	PTS	10 (10)	1998-10-10	Palais Omnisport de Paris-Bercy, Paris, France	
29	Win	25–3–1	Keith Holmes	UD	12 (12)	1998-05-02	Astroballe, Villeurbanne, France	Won WBC middleweight title
28	Loss	24–3–1	Robin Reid	SD	12 (12)	1997-09-11	Kingsway Leisure Centre, Widnes, England, U.K.	For WBC super middleweight title
27	Win	24–2–1	Neville Brown	TKO	6 (12)	1997-04-26	Greenbank Leisure Centre, Swadlincote, England, U.K.	Retained EBU middleweight title
26	Win	23–2–1	Branko Sobot	UD	12 (12)	1997-01-25	Maritim Hotel, Stuttgart, Germany	Retained EBU middleweight title
25	Win	22–2–1	Michel Simeon	KO	5 (8)	1996-12-21	Villeurbanne, France	
24	Win	21–2–1	Heath Todd	TKO	5 (10)	1996-11-30	Arena Nova, Wiener Neustadt, Austria	
23	Win	20–2–1	Alexander Zaytsev	PTS	12 (12)	1996-10-19	Berck, France	Won EBU middleweight title
22	Win	19–2–1	Patrick Vungbo	PTS	8 (8)	1996-05-04	Villeurbanne, France	
21	Win	18–2–1	Erland Betare	TKO	2 (10)	1996-04-05	Chateauroux, France	Retained French middleweight title
20	Win	17–2–1	Thierry Trevillot	PTS	10 (10)	1996-03-08	Rillieux, France	
19	Win	16–2–1	Ricky Thomas	KO	3 (8)	1996-01-13	Palais des Spectacular, Saint-Etienne, France	
18	Win	15–2–1	Mustapha Dundar	TKO	8 (10)	1995-12-08	Chateauroux, France	
17	Win	14–2–1	Stephane Jegou	TKO	3 (8)	1995-10-26	Bron, France	
16	Draw	13–2–1	Erland Betare	PTS	8 (8)	1995-06-27	Palais des sports Marcel-Cerdan, Levallois-Perret, France	
15	Win	13–2	Thierry Trevillot	TKO	6 (10)	1995-04-01	Levallois-Perret, France	Won French middleweight title
14	Win	12–2	Mustapha Dundar	PTS	10 (10)	1994-12-16	Vendôme, France	
13	Win	11–2	Viktor Plotnikov	TKO	6 (6)	1994-10-25	Besançon, France	
12	Win	10–2	Felix Jose Hernandez	KO	3 (6)	1994-06-04	Palais des sports Marcel-Cerdan, Levallois-Perret, France	
11	Win	9–2	Jimmy Gourad	TKO	8 (8)	1994-04-17	Maison des Sports, Clermont-Ferrand, France	
10	Loss	8–2	Gino Lelong	TKO	8 (10)	1994-01-20	Levallois-Perret, France	For French middleweight title
9	Win	8–1	Laurent Kante	KO	7 (10)	1993-12-18	Le Mans, France	
8	Win	7–1	Mario Lavouiray	KO	3 (?)	1993-11-13	Caen, France	
7	Win	6–1	Dominique Wadin	KO	1 (6)	1993-04-23	Saint-Brieuc, France	
6	Win	5–1	Lansana Diallo	PTS	6 (6)	1993-03-27	Casino Royal, Evian les Bains, France	
5	Win	4–1	Mohammed Hamila	PTS	6 (6)	1993-03-06	Palais des sports Marcel-Cerdan, Levallois-Perret, France	
4	Win	3–1	Kristo Slavchev	TKO	3 (6)	1993-01-31	Levallois-Perret, France	
3	Win	2–1	Milko Stoikov	KO	1 (6)	1992-11-13	Bellegarde, France	
2	Win	1–1	Mustapha Hachemi	TKO	2 (6)	1992-10-03	Cirque d'hiver, Paris, France	
1	Loss	0–1	Zacharie Mulamba	PTS	6 (6)	1989-12-16	Ajaccio, France	

== See also ==
- List of world middleweight boxing champions

Sporting positions
Regional boxing titles
Preceded by Alexander Zaytsev	EBU middleweight champion 19 October 1996 – 1998; Vacated	Vacant Title next held by Agostino Cardamone
World boxing titles
Preceded by Keith Holmes	WBC middleweight champion 2 May 1998 – 24 April 1999	Succeeded by Keith Holmes
