= Carl Daniels =

American boxer

Personal information
- Nickname: The Squirrel
- Born: Carl Bryant Daniels; August 26, 1970 (age 55) St. Louis, Missouri, U.S.
- Height: 5 ft 9 in (175 cm)
- Weight: Light middleweight; Middleweight; Super middleweight; Light heavyweight

Boxing career
- Reach: 70 1/2 in (179 cm)
- Stance: Southpaw

Boxing record
- Total fights: 69
- Wins: 50
- Win by KO: 32
- Losses: 18
- Draws: 1

Carl Bryant Daniels (born August 26, 1970 in St. Louis, Missouri), is an American former professional boxer who competed from 1988 to 2009. He held the World Boxing Association (WBA) light middleweight title in 1995.

== Amateur career ==
Southpaw Daniels won the junior world championships 1987 and the Golden Gloves at flyweight.

He was a US feather champ in 1988 and beat Kevin Kelley in the Olympic trials. His record: 170-7.

== Professional career ==
Daniels, nicknamed "The Squirrel", turned pro in 1988 and in 1992 landed a shot at the WBC Light Middleweight Title against Terry Norris. Norris won via TKO. In 1995, he fought Julio César Green for the Vacant WBA Light Middleweight Title and won a decision. In his first defense, he lost the title to Julio César Vásquez via 11th round TKO. Daniels was leading on the scorecards until the knockout happened; it ranked as Ring Magazine's Knockout Of The Year. In 1997 he got a chance to reclaim the belt against Laurent Boudouani, but lost a decision. It wasn't until 2002 that he got a shot at another major belt, taking on Bernard Hopkins and losing in a 10th round TKO.

== Professional boxing record ==
69 fights	50 wins	18 losses
By knockout	32	10
By decision	18	8
Draws	1	

No.	Result	Record	Opponent	Type	Round, time	Date	Location	Notes
69	Loss	50–18–1	Derek Edwards	TKO	6 (10)	Aug 29, 2009	Benton Convention Center, Winston-Salem, North Carolina, U.S.	
68	Loss	50–17–1	Chuck Mussachio	UD	6	May 15, 2009	Harrah's Marina Hotel Casino, Atlantic City, New Jersey, U.S.	
67	Loss	50–16–1	Allan Green	TKO	7 (8)	Nov 15, 2008	Memorial Gymnasium, Nashville, Tennessee, U.S.	
66	Loss	50–15–1	Anthony Bonsante	UD	10	Sep 20, 2008	Treasure Island Resort & Casino, Welch, Minnesota, U.S.	
65	Loss	50–14–1	Tarvis Simms	UD	6	Aug 6, 2008	Aviator Sports and Events Center, Brooklyn, New York, U.S.	
64	Loss	50–13–1	George Walton	UD	6	May 17, 2008	Aviator Sports and Events Center, Brooklyn, New York, U.S.	
63	Loss	50–12–1	Zach Walters	RTD	7 (10)	Feb 23, 2008	Mortorelli Gym, Superior, Wisconsin, U.S.	For vacant ABU light-heavyweight title
62	Win	50–11–1	Fred Moore	TKO	6 (8)	Dec 15, 2007	Grand Casino, Hinckley, Minnesota, U.S.	
61	Loss	49–11–1	Andy Lee	KO	3 (6)	Mar 16, 2007	Madison Square Garden, New York City, New York, U.S.	
60	Loss	49–10–1	Jaidon Codrington	UD	6	Aug 5, 2006	Madison Square Garden, New York City, New York, U.S.	
59	Loss	49–9–1	Dante Craig	TKO	10 (10)	Jun 16, 2006	Westshore Doubletree Hotel, Tampa, Florida, U.S.	
58	Loss	49–8–1	Curtis Stevens	UD	8	Apr 20, 2006	Grand Ballroom, New York City, New York, U.S.	
57	Loss	49–7–1	Joey Spina	UD	10	Jun 17, 2005	Dunkin Donuts Center, Providence, Rhode Island, U.S.	For vacant WBC (USNBC) super-middleweight title
56	Loss	49–6–1	Joachim Alcine	TKO	6 (10)	Apr 9, 2005	Montreal Casino, Montreal, Quebec, Canada	
55	Loss	49–5–1	Chad Dawson	TKO	7 (10)	Dec 10, 2004	Foxwoods Resort, Ledyard, Connecticut, U.S.	For WBC Youth middleweight title
54	Win	49–4–1	Rico Cason	TKO	2 (8)	Mar 13, 2004	Mandalay Bay Resort & Casino, Paradise, Nevada, U.S.	
53	Win	48–4–1	Nicolas Cervera	UD	12	Jul 27, 2002	Scope Arena, Norfolk, Virginia, U.S.	
52	Loss	47–4–1	Bernard Hopkins	RTD	10 (12)	Feb 2, 2002	Sovereign Center, Reading, Pennsylvania, U.S.	For WBA (Super), WBC, IBF & The Ring middleweight titles
51	Win	47–3–1	Brian Barbosa	UD	12	Dec 29, 2000	Mountaineer Casino, New Cumberland, West Virginia, U.S.	
50	Win	46–3–1	Anthony Atkinson	TKO	6 (10)	Jun 9, 2000	Turning Stone Resort Casino, Verona, New York, U.S.	
49	Win	45–3–1	Ray Collins	UD	10	Mar 7, 2000	Casino Windsor, Windsor, Ontario, Canada	
48	Win	44–3–1	Robert Frazier	TKO	8 (10)	Nov 19, 1999	Turning Stone Resort Casino, Verona, New York, U.S.	
47	Win	43–3–1	Bobby Heath	UD	10	Jun 11, 1999	Turning Stone Resort Casino, Verona, New York, U.S.	
46	Draw	42–3–1	Eddie Hall	TD	4 (10)	Apr 8, 1999	The Roostertail, Detroit, Michigan, U.S.	
45	Win	42–3	Floyd Williams	KO	3 (12)	Oct 15, 1998	Washington Hilton & Towers, Washington, D.C., U.S.	Retained USBA light-middleweight title
44	Win	41–3	Jamie Stevenson	TKO	6 (6)	Sep 15, 1998	UAW Hall, St. Louis, Missouri, U.S.	
43	Win	40–3	Purcell Miller	UD	12	Jul 14, 1998	Casino Magic, Bay St. Louis, Mississippi, U.S.	Won vacant USBA light-middleweight title
42	Win	39–3	Steve Fisher	TKO	5 (8)	Jun 12, 1998	Turning Stone Resort Casino, Verona, New York, U.S.	
41	Loss	38–3	Laurent Boudouani	UD	12	Mar 29, 1997	Hilton Hotel, Winchester, Nevada, U.S.	For WBA light-middleweight title
40	Win	38–2	James Mason	TKO	3 (10)	Jan 11, 1997	Nashville Arena, Nashville, Tennessee, U.S.	
39	Win	37–2	Roland Rangel	RTD	4 (10)	Sep 7, 1996	MGM Grand Garden Arena, Paradise, Nevada, U.S.	
38	Win	35–2	Tim Dendy	TKO	6 (10)	Feb 24, 1996	Richmond Coliseum, Richmond, Virginia, U.S.	
37	Loss	35–2	Julio César Vásquez	TKO	11 (12)	Dec 16, 1995	Core States Spectrum, Philadelphia, Pennsylvania, U.S.	Lost WBA light-middleweight title
36	Win	35–1	Julio César Green	UD	12	Jun 16, 1995	Palais des Sports de Gerland, Lyon, France	Won vacant WBA light-middleweight title
35	Win	34–1	James Mason	RTD	2 (10)	Apr 8, 1995	Caesars Palace, Paradise, Nevada, U.S.	
34	Win	33–1	Sergio Medina	UD	12	Feb 22, 1995	The Dome Center, Henrietta, New York, U.S.	Won vacant WBF middleweight title
33	Win	32–1	Robert Cameron	KO	1 (?)	Aug 29, 1994	Louisville Gardens, Louisville, Kentucky, U.S.	
32	Win	31–1	Marris Virgil	TKO	3 (?)	Dec 18, 1993	Palmer Auditorium, Davenport, Iowa, U.S.	
31	Win	30–1	Louis Howard	UD	10	Mar 30, 1993	Sports Arena, San Diego, California, U.S.	
30	Win	29–1	Tyrone Moore	KO	3 (10)	Dec 15, 1992	Foxwoods Resort, Ledyard, Connecticut, U.S.	
29	Win	28–1	Jake Torrance	RTD	3 (10)	Sep 29, 1992	Civic Center, Bismarck, North Dakota, U.S.	
28	Win	27–1	Curtis Summit	PTS	8	Apr 23, 1992	Cirque d'hiver, Paris, France	
27	Loss	26–1	Terry Norris	TKO	9 (12)	Feb 22, 1992	Sports Arena, San Diego, California, U.S.	For WBC light-middleweight title
26	Win	26–0	Anthony Ivory	PTS	8 (8)	Oct 12, 1991	Stade Louis II, Fontvieille, Monaco	
25	Win	25–0	Kenneth Kidd	TKO	3 (10)	Jul 2, 1991	Civic Center, Providence, Rhode Island, U.S.	
24	Win	24–0	Robert Vasquez	TKO	3 (8)	May 4, 1991	Civic Center Arena, Laredo, Texas, U.S.	
23	Win	23–0	Anthony Williams	TKO	3 (10)	Feb 15, 1991	Clarion Hotel Ballroom, St. Louis, Missouri, U.S.	
22	Win	22–0	Oscar Ponce	UD	10	Oct 23, 1990	Trump Plaza Hotel, Atlantic City, New Jersey, U.S.	
21	Win	21–0	Gary Williamson	TKO	1 (10)	Sep 10, 1990	Henry VIII Hotel, Bridgeton, Missouri, U.S.	Won vacant Missouri middleweight title
20	Win	20–0	Hugo Sclarandi	UD	6	Aug 19, 1990	Bally's Hotel & Casino, Reno, Nevada, U.S.	
19	Win	19–0	Jake Torrance	UD	10	Jul 30, 1990	Henry VIII Hotel, Bridgeton, Missouri, U.S.	
18	Win	18–0	Wilberforce Kiggundu	TKO	4 (6)	Jul 8, 1990	Harrah's Hotel & Casino, Reno, Nevada, U.S.	
17	Win	17–0	Alejandro Barbosa	TKO	2 (10)	May 5, 1990	Brown County Arena, Ashwaubenon, Wisconsin, U.S.	
16	Win	16–0	Anthony Bryant	TKO	9 (10)	Apr 16, 1990	Clarion Hotel Ballroom, St. Louis, Missouri, U.S.	
15	Win	15–0	Reese Smith	TKO	8 (8)	Mar 9, 1990	Clarion Hotel Ballroom, St. Louis, Missouri, U.S.	
14	Win	14–0	Larry Nichols	TKO	2 (8)	Jan 22, 1990	Clarion Hotel Ballroom, St. Louis, Missouri, U.S.	
13	Win	13–0	John Garner	TKO	3 (8)	Dec 1, 1989	Henry VIII Hotel, Bridgeton, Missouri, U.S.	
12	Win	12–0	Calvin Edwards	TKO	3 (?)	Nov 13, 1989	Central Park Athletic Club, Milwaukee, Wisconsin, U.S.	
11	Win	11–0	Jerry Grant	KO	1 (6)	Oct 9, 1989	Clarion Hotel Ballroom, St. Louis, Missouri, U.S.	
10	Win	10–0	Manuel Madera	TKO	3 (?)	Sep 28, 1989	Central Maine Civic Center, Lewiston, Maine, U.S.	
9	Win	9–0	Bill Robinson	TKO	4 (6)	Sep 15, 1989	Civic Center, Hartford, Connecticut, U.S.	
8	Win	8–0	Ricardo Simpson	TKO	4 (6)	Aug 21, 1989	Henry VIII Hotel, Bridgeton, Missouri, U.S.	
7	Win	7–0	James Ruff	TKO	2 (6)	Jun 26, 1989	Odeum Expo Center, Villa Park, Illinois, U.S.	
6	Win	6–0	Tim Payton	TKO	1 (6)	Jun 5, 1989	Henry VIII Hotel, Bridgeton, Missouri, U.S.	
5	Win	5–0	Anthony Travis	UD	6	Apr 21, 1989	Chicagoland Expo, Harvey, Illinois, U.S.	
4	Win	4–0	Matt Trejo	UD	4	Feb 4, 1989	Caesars Palace, Paradise, Nevada, U.S.	
3	Win	3–0	Henry Mobley	UD	4	Jan 3, 1989	Park West, Chicago, Illinois, U.S.	
2	Win	2–0	Kelvin Williams	UD	4	Dec 7, 1988	Harvey, Illinois, U.S.	
1	Win	1–0	Terry Parnham	UD	4	Nov 1, 1988	Park West, Chicago, Illinois, U.S.	

== See also ==
- List of male boxers
- List of southpaw stance boxers
- List of world light-middleweight boxing champions

Sporting positions
Amateur boxing titles
Previous: Anthony Wilson	Golden Gloves; Flyweight champion 1987	Next: Jesse Medina
Previous: Kelcie Banks	U.S. Featherweight champion 1988	Next: Frank Peña
Regional boxing titles
New title	Missouri middleweight champion September 10, 1990 – February 22, 1995; Vacated	Vacant Title next held by Colby Courter
Vacant Title last held by Aaron Davis	USBA light-middleweight champion July 14, 1998 – 1999; Vacated	Vacant Title next held by Paul Vaden
Minor world boxing titles
Vacant Title last held by Roberto Coelho	WBF middleweight champion February 22, 1995 – 1995; Vacated	Vacant Title next held by Joaquin Velasquez
Major world boxing titles
Vacant Title last held by Pernell Whitaker	WBA light-middleweight champion June 16, 1995 – December 16, 1995	Succeeded by Julio César Vásquez
