= Robert McCracken =

English boxer (born 1969)

Rob McCracken
Personal information
- Nationality: British
- Born: Robert Chad McCracken; 31 May 1968 (age 58) Birmingham, West Midlands, England
- Height: 6 ft 1 in (185 cm)
- Weight: Light-middleweight; Middleweight

Boxing career
- Reach: 73 in (185 cm)

Boxing record
- Total fights: 35
- Wins: 33
- Win by KO: 21
- Losses: 2

Robert Chad “Bob” McCracken CBE (born 31 May 1969) is a British former professional boxer who competed from 1991 to 2001, and has since worked as a boxing trainer. He once challenged for the WBC middleweight title in 2000. At regional level, he held the British super-welterweight title from 1994 to 1995; the Commonwealth middleweight title from 1995 to 1996; and once challenged for the vacant European middleweight title in 2001.

== Boxing career ==
=== Amateur ===
McCracken worked as a wood machinist at Hoskins Cabinet Works, Bordesley, Birmingham before turning to boxing. He was affectionately known as "Boxing Bob". He represented England in the welterweight division, at the 1990 Commonwealth Games in Auckland, New Zealand, reaching the quarter finals.

Boxing for Birmingham City ABC, he was runner-up of the prestigious ABA light-welterweight championship in 1989.

=== Professional ===
McCracken turned pro in 1991 in the super-welterweight division. In February 1994 he won the British title by outpointing Andy Till, and defended it twice, outpointing Steve "The Viking" Foster and Paul Wesley.

In November 1995, he officially moved into the middleweight division, winning the vacant Commonwealth title by outpointing Canadian southpaw Fitzgerald Bruney. He would successfully retain the title twice by beating Paul Busby and Bruney again in a rematch, before relocating to the United States in 1997 and progressing up the world rankings.

In February 1998, he achieved a notable victory outpointing Lonnie Beasley, and over the course of four fights elevated himself to #1 contender status in the WBC rankings.

In April 2000 McCracken challenged American southpaw Keith Holmes for the WBC middleweight title. The fight was the main event of the UK show that preceded Lennox Lewis's high-profile fight with Michael Grant in New York the same night. To preserve his ranking McCracken had been inactive for a year and his ring rust showed, as he fell behind early and stayed there. The referee stopped the fight in the eleventh-round.

McCracken was inactive for another year while training other boxers, before returning in April 2001 to fight highly regarded Howard Eastman, who now held the British and Commonwealth titles and a 31–0 record. The vacant European title was also on the line, however McCracken's long layoffs once again hurt him, after a close, tough fight McCracken wilted in the tenth-round to Eastman's power punching.

== Coaching ==
McCracken was the main and best head coach of the British boxing team at the 2012 Olympics. McCracken has also trained retired super-middleweight champion Carl Froch and former unified WBA (Super), IBF, WBO, and IBO heavyweight champion Anthony Joshua. McCracken is currently the Performance Director at GB Boxing.

== Honours ==
McCracken was appointed Member of the Order of the British Empire (MBE) in the 2013 New Year Honours for services to boxing and the London 2012 Olympic and Paralympic Games and Commander of the Order of the British Empire (CBE) in the 2022 New Year Honours for services to boxing.

== Professional boxing record ==
35 fights	33 wins	2 losses
By knockout	22	2
By decision	10	0
By disqualification	1	0

Key to abbreviations used for results
DQ	Disqualification	RTD	Corner retirement
KO	Knockout	SD	Split decision / split draw
MD	Majority decision / majority draw	TD	Technical decision / technical draw
NC	No contest	TKO	Technical knockout
PTS	Points decision	UD	Unanimous decision / unanimous draw

Boxing record
No.	Result	Record	Opponent	Type	Round(s)	Time	Date	Location	Notes
35	Loss	33–2	(United Kingdom) Howard Eastman	TKO	10 (12)	1:54	10 Apr 2001	(United Kingdom) Wembley Conference Centre, Wembley, Greater London, UK	For Commonwealth, British and vacant EBU European middleweight titles
34	Loss	33–1	(United States) Keith Holmes	TKO	11 (12)	2:24	29 Apr 2000	(United Kingdom) Wembley Arena, Wembley, Greater London, UK	For WBC middleweight title
33	Win	33–0	(United States) Steve Fisher	TKO	10 (10)	0:06	6 Mar 1999	(United States) Boardwalk Hall, Atlantic City, New Jersey, USA	
32	Win	32–0	(United States) Napoleon Pitt	TKO	6 (10)	2:25	31 Oct 1998	(United States) Boardwalk Hall, Atlantic City, New Jersey, USA	
