= Keith Holmes (boxer) =

American boxer

Personal information
- Born: Keith Pickett Holmes; March 30, 1969 (age 57) Washington, D.C., U.S.
- Height: 6 ft 2 in (188 cm)
- Weight: Light middleweight; Middleweight

Boxing career
- Reach: 78 in (198 cm)
- Stance: Southpaw

Boxing record
- Total fights: 46
- Wins: 41
- Win by KO: 25
- Losses: 5

Keith Pickett Holmes (born March 30, 1969) is an American former boxer.

== Professional career ==
Holmes began his pro career in 1989 and captured the WBC Middleweight Title by scoring a TKO over Quincy Taylor in 1996. He defended the title twice before losing the belt to Hassine Cherifi in 1998, a decision loss in which he dropped Cherifi once. In 1999, Holmes landed a rematch with Cherifi and regained the belt via a 7th-round TKO. Holmes again defended the title twice before losing the belt to middleweight legend Bernard Hopkins in a clear-cut decision loss as part of the Middleweight World Championship Series unification tournament.

He continued to fight sparingly after the loss to Hopkins, and in 2005 lost an IBF Light Middleweight Title Eliminator bout against Roman Karmazin in a close majority decision.

Holmes is a vegan.

== Professional boxing record ==
46 fights	41 wins	5 losses
By knockout	25	0
By decision	16	5

No.	Result	Record	Opponent	Type	Round, time	Date	Age	Location	Notes
46	Win	41–5	Willis Lockett	UD	8	Jun 6, 2009	40 years, 132 days	Walter E. Washington Convention Center, Washington, D.C., U.S.	
45	Loss	40–5	Tito Mendoza	UD	8	Aug 16, 2006	37 years, 139 days	Figali Convention Center, Panama City, Panama	
44	Win	40–4	Cory Cummings	UD	10	Oct 7, 2006	37 years, 191 days	Allstate Arena, Rosemont, Illinois, U.S.	
43	Loss	39–4	Roman Karmazin	MD	12	Apr 2, 2005	36 years, 3 days	DCU Center, Worcester, Massachusetts, U.S.	IBF light middleweight title eliminator
42	Win	39–3	Kuvonchbek Toygonbaev	MD	10	Mar 14, 2004	34 years, 350 days	Pechanga Resort & Casino, Temecula, California, U.S.	
41	Win	38–3	Jason Papillion	TKO	8 (8), 2:40	Oct 4, 2003	34 years, 188 days	Mandalay Bay Resort & Casino, Las Vegas, Nevada, U.S.	
40	Win	37–3	Anthony Ivory	UD	10	Aug 9, 2003	34 years, 132 days	Convention Center, Washington, D.C., U.S.	
39	Loss	36–3	Bernard Hopkins	UD	12	Apr 14, 2001	32 years, 15 days	Madison Square Garden, New York City, New York, U.S.	Lost WBC middleweight title
38	Win	36–2	Robert McCracken	TKO	11 (12), 2:24	Apr 29, 2000	31 years, 30 days	Wembley Arena, Wembley, London, England, U.K.	Retained WBC middleweight title
37	Win	35–2	Andrew Council	UD	12	Sep 24, 1999	30 years, 178 days	MCI Center, Washington, D.C., U.S.	Retained WBC middleweight title
36	Win	34–2	Hacine Cherifi	TKO	7 (12), 2:13	Apr 24, 1999	30 years, 25 days	MCI Center, Washington, D.C., U.S.	Won WBC middleweight title
35	Win	33–2	Alex Lubo	TKO	1 (10)	Feb 6, 1999	29 years, 313 days	Washington Convention Center, Washington, D.C., U.S.	
34	Win	32–2	Urbano Gurrola	UD	10	Nov 13, 1998	29 years, 228 days	Hilton Hotel, Winchester, Nevada, U.S.	
33	Loss	31–2	Hacine Cherifi	UD	12	May 2, 1998	29 years, 33 days	Astroballe, Villeurbanne, Rhône, France	Lost WBC middleweight title
32	Win	31–1	Paul Vaden	TKO	11 (12), 1:11	Dec 5, 1997	28 years, 250 days	Amphitheater, Pompano Beach, Florida, U.S.	Retained WBC middleweight title
31	Win	30–1	Richie Woodhall	TKO	12 (12), 2:32	Oct 19, 1996	27 years, 203 days	The Show Place Arena, Upper Marlboro, Maryland, U.S.	Retained WBC middleweight title
30	Win	29–1	Quincy Taylor	TKO	9 (12), 1:43	Mar 16, 1996	26 years, 352 days	MGM Grand Garden Arena, Paradise, Nevada, U.S.	Won WBC middleweight title
29	Win	28–1	Kevin Tillman	UD	6	Dec 16, 1995	26 years, 261 days	Spectrum, Philadelphia, Pennsylvania, U.S.	
28	Win	27–1	Tommy Small	TKO	4 (10), 2:58	Aug 19, 1995	26 years, 142 days	MGM Grand, Las Vegas, Nevada, U.S.	
27	Win	26–1	Kenneth Kidd	TKO	1 (10), 2:13	Apr 10, 1995	26 years, 11 days	Brewery's Thunderdome, Louisville, Kentucky, U.S.	
26	Win	25–1	Sam Wilson	KO	2 (10), 1:22	Mar 20, 1995	25 years, 355 days	Louisville Gardens, Louisville, Kentucky, U.S.	
25	Win	24–1	Andrew Council	UD	12	Sep 23, 1994	25 years, 177 days	Show Place Arena, Upper Marlboro, Maryland, U.S.	Won vacant USBA super welterweight title
24	Win	23–1	Darryl Lattimore	KO	3 (?)	Aug 18, 1994	25 years, 141 days	Convention Center, Washington, D.C., U.S.	
23	Win	22–1	Eric Rhinehart	TKO	2 (10), 2:28	Jul 20, 1994	25 years, 112 days	The Ritz, Raleigh, North Carolina, U.S.	
22	Win	21–1	Kelcie Banks	TKO	3 (10), 1:48	May 11, 1994	25 years, 42 days	ABC Auditorium, Annandale, Virginia, U.S.	
21	Win	20–1	Luis Castillo	KO	2 (?)	Apr 8, 1994	25 years, 9 days	Show Place Arena, Upper Marlboro, Maryland, U.S.	
20	Win	19–1	Sam Gervins	TKO	2 (?)	Apr 2, 1994	25 years, 3 days	Richmond, Virginia, U.S.	
19	Win	18–1	Bobby Hightower	KO	1 (?)	Mar 16, 1994	24 years, 351 days	Forest City, North Carolina, U.S.	
18	Win	17–1	Jeff Johnson	UD	12	Jan 27, 1994	24 years, 303 days	ABC Auditorium, Annandale, Virginia, U.S.	
17	Win	16–1	Jim Jackson	TKO	1 (?)	Dec 7, 1993	24 years, 252 days	Grand Theatre, New Albany, Indiana, U.S.	
16	Win	15–1	Reggie Strickland	UD	8	Dec 2, 1993	24 years, 247 days	Louisville, Kentucky, U.S.	
15	Win	14–1	Harold Bennett	KO	3 (?)	Nov 12, 1993	24 years, 227 days	Richmond, Virginia, U.S.	
14	Win	13–1	Kimara Davis	TKO	1 (?)	Oct 14, 1993	24 years, 198 days	Richmond, Virginia, U.S.	
13	Win	12–1	Ralph Southerland	KO	1 (?)	Oct 8, 1993	24 years, 192 days	Charlotte, North Carolina, U.S.	
12	Win	11–1	Nick Parker	TKO	6 (?)	Sep 25, 1993	24 years, 179 days	Erie, Pennsylvania, U.S.	
11	Win	10–1	Lennell Stroman	KO	1 (?)	Sep 4, 1993	24 years, 158 days	Forest City, North Carolina, U.S.	
10	Win	9–1	Horace Watterson	PTS	6	Aug 14, 1993	24 years, 137 days	Falls Church, Virginia, U.S.	
9	Win	8–1	Jose Hiram Torres	TKO	6 (?), 2:31	Apr 10, 1991	22 years, 11 days	La Fontaine Bleue, Lanham, Maryland, U.S.	
8	Loss	7–1	Ronald Hammond	UD	6	Jul 20, 1990	21 years, 112 days	Blue Horizon, Philadelphia, Pennsylvania, U.S.	
7	Win	7–0	Anthony Ross	UD	6	Jun 15, 1990	21 years, 77 days	Coolidge High Fieldhouse, Washington, D.C., U.S.	
6	Win	6–0	Tom Alexander	UD	6	Jun 1, 1990	21 years, 63 days	Teamsters Local 557 Hall, Baltimore, Maryland, U.S.	
5	Win	5–0	Anthony Green	SD	6	May 17, 1990	21 years, 48 days	National Guard Armory, Philadelphia, Pennsylvania, U.S.	
4	Win	4–0	Drew Hayes	PTS	4	Apr 3, 1990	21 years, 4 days	The Blue Horizon, Philadelphia, Pennsylvania, U.S.	
3	Win	3–0	Jerome Washington	KO	1 (?)	Feb 10, 1990	20 years, 317 days	Washington, D.C., U.S.	
2	Win	2–0	Roland Jones	TKO	2 (?)	Nov 15, 1989	20 years, 230 days	Teamsters Local 557 Hall, Baltimore, Maryland, U.S.	
1	Win	1–0	Kilpatrick Mitchell	UD	4	Oct 26, 1989	20 years, 210 days	International Hotel & Resorts, Atlantic City, New Jersey, U.S.	

== See also ==
- List of world middleweight boxing champions

Sporting positions
Regional boxing titles
Vacant Title last held by Vincent Pettway	USBA Super Welter champion September 23, 1994 – 1994; Vacated	Vacant Title next held by Raúl Márquez
World boxing titles
Preceded by Quincy Taylor	WBC middleweight champion March 16, 1996 – May 2, 1998	Succeeded by Hacine Cherifi
Preceded by Hacine Cherifi	WBC middleweight champion April 24, 1999 – Apr 14, 2001	Succeeded by Bernard Hopkins
