= William Joppy =

American boxer (born 1970)

Personal information
- Born: William Torelle Joppy; September 11, 1970 (age 56) Silver Spring, Maryland, U.S.
- Height: 5 ft 9 in (175 cm)
- Weight: Middleweight; Super middleweight; Light heavyweight

Boxing career
- Reach: 72 1/2 in (184 cm)
- Stance: Orthodox

Boxing record
- Total fights: 49
- Wins: 40
- Win by KO: 30
- Losses: 7
- Draws: 2

William Torelle Joppy (born September 11, 1970) is an American former professional boxer who competed from 1993 to 2011, and held the WBA middleweight title three times between 1996 and 2003.

== Professional career ==
Turning pro in 1993, Joppy built up a record of 21–0–1 (17 KO) before getting his first shot a world title.

=== WBA middleweight champion ===
Joppy won his first of two WBA middleweight titles in June 1996 by stopping defending champion Shinji Takehara in Japan with a flurry of punches in the ninth round. He then would make a couple defenses of his crown. However, on August 23, 1997, Joppy lost a decision to Julio César Green. Joppy's very next fight, on January 31 of the next year, saw him avenge that loss with a decision win by a wide margin. This fight won Joppy the WBA title for the second time. After recovering from a neck injury, Joppy stopped Green on cuts in the seventh round in a rubber match (Green had been the interim champion while Joppy recovered), and made a few more defenses, including a 3rd-round TKO of a 47-year-old Roberto Durán.

=== Losing his title against Trinidad ===
Joppy lost the title a second time, however, on May 12, 2001, to Félix Trinidad in the middleweight unification tournament. Joppy was knocked down in rounds one and four before finally being stopped in the fifth. He would credit Trinidad's power after the fight saying "I've never been hit like that before."

=== Post title ===
After Bernard Hopkins beat Trinidad, Joppy had the chance to fight for the new WBA (Regular) belt. He claimed the title from British contender Howard Eastman in a close majority decision where he was knocked down by Eastman in the final few seconds.

On December 14, 2003, Joppy was stripped of his title following a challenge to undisputed champion Bernard Hopkins, losing by a wide points margin on all three judges' cards. A year later, Joppy lost another lopsided unanimous decision against Jermain Taylor.

Joppy returned as a Super Middleweight on July 29, 2005 knocking out journeyman Rashaan Blackburn in the third round. Joppy said then that he hoped to have one final title run as a Super Middleweight before retirement. After a string of five victories against lesser opponents, Joppy obtained a title fight against the new IBF champion Lucian Bute on February 29, 2008. Bute won by way of technical knockout in round 10 and Joppy retired after the bout, only to come back two years later.

=== Retirement ===
Following a close decision loss to Sebastien Demers in March 2010 Joppy announced his retirement from boxing, although it was not the first time that Joppy has announced that he is leaving the sport. He returned to the ring later that year, fighting Baltimore native Cory Cummings to a draw, and subsequently defeated Cummings by unanimous decision in a 2011 rematch.

== Professional boxing record ==
49 fights	40 wins	7 losses
By knockout	30	3
By decision	10	4
Draws	2	

No.	Result	Record	Opponent	Type	Round, time	Date	Location	Notes
49	Win	40–7–2	Cory Cummings	UD	10	Mar 12, 2011	Patriot Center, Fairfax, Virginia, U.S.	
48	Loss	39–7–2	Beibut Shumenov	KO	6 (12), 0:15	Jan 8, 2011	Sport Palace, Shymkent, Kazakhstan	For WBA and IBA light heavyweight titles
47	Draw	39–6–2	Cory Cummings	MD	10	Nov 6, 2010	Patriot Center, Fairfax, Virginia, U.S.	
46	Loss	39–6–1	Sébastien Demers	MD	10	Mar 6, 2010	Montreal Casino, Montreal, Quebec, Canada	
45	Loss	39–5–1	Lucian Bute	TKO	10 (12), 1:08	Feb 29, 2008	Bell Centre, Montreal, Quebec, Canada	For IBF super middleweight title
44	Win	39–4–1	Etianne Whitaker	TKO	1, 1:58	Nov 16, 2007	Beauséjour Stadium, Gros Islet, Saint Lucia	
43	Win	38–4–1	Virgil McClendon	RTD	1 (10), 3:00	Apr 27, 2007	D.C. Armory, Washington, D.C., U.S.	
42	Win	37–4–1	Jonathan Corn	KO	5 (10), 2:18	Jul 8, 2006	Savvis Center, St. Louis, Missouri, U.S.	
41	Win	36–4–1	Eric Howard	TKO	5 (8), 2:12	Jan 7, 2006	Madison Square Garden, New York City, New York, U.S.	
40	Win	35–4–1	Rashaan Blackburn	TKO	3 (8), 2:08	Jul 29, 2005	The Plex, North Charleston, South Carolina, U.S.	
39	Loss	34–4–1	Jermain Taylor	UD	12	Dec 4, 2004	Barton Coliseum, Little Rock, Arkansas, U.S.	For WBC Continental Americas middleweight title
38	Loss	34–3–1	Bernard Hopkins	UD	12	Dec 13, 2003	Boardwalk Hall, Atlantic City, New Jersey, U.S.	For WBA (Undisputed), WBC, IBF, and The Ring middleweight titles
37	Win	34–2–1	Naotaka Hozumi	TKO	10 (12), 2:48	Oct 10, 2002	Ryōgoku Kokugikan, Tokyo, Japan	Retained WBA (Regular) middleweight title
36	Win	33–2–1	Howard Eastman	MD	12	Nov 17, 2001	Mandalay Bay Events Center, Paradise, Nevada, U.S.	Won vacant WBA (Regular) middleweight title
35	Loss	32–2–1	Félix Trinidad	TKO	5 (12), 2:25	May 12, 2001	Madison Square Garden, New York City, New York, U.S.	Lost WBA middleweight title
34	Win	32–1–1	Jonathan Reid	TKO	4 (12), 2:43	Dec 2, 2000	Mandalay Bay Events Center, Paradise, Nevada, U.S.	Retained WBA middleweight title
33	Win	31–1–1	Hacine Cherifi	UD	12	Sep 16, 2000	MGM Grand Garden Arena, Paradise, Nevada, U.S.	Retained WBA middleweight title
32	Win	30–1–1	Rito Ruvalcaba	TKO	1 (12), 1:53	May 20, 2000	Grand Casino, Tunica, Mississippi, U.S.	Retained WBA middleweight title
31	Win	29–1–1	Fernando Zuniga	UD	10	Mar 3, 2000	Caesars Palace, Paradise, Nevada, U.S.	
30	Win	28–1–1	Julio César Green	TKO	7 (12), 1:52	Sep 24, 1999	MCI Center, Washington, D.C., U.S.	Retained WBA middleweight title
29	Win	27–1–1	Napoleon Pitt	TKO	1 (10), 2:38	Jul 24, 1999	Flamingo Hilton, Paradise, Nevada, U.S.	
28	Win	26–1–1	Roberto Durán	TKO	3 (12), 2:54	Aug 28, 1998	Las Vegas Hilton, Winchester, Nevada, U.S.	Retained WBA middleweight title
27	Win	25–1–1	Julio César Green	UD	12	Jan 31, 1998	Ice Palace, Tampa, Florida, U.S.	Won WBA middleweight title
26	Loss	24–1–1	Julio César Green	UD	12	Aug 23, 1997	Madison Square Garden, New York City, New York, U.S.	Lost WBA middleweight title
25	Win	24–0–1	Peter Venancio	UD	12	May 10, 1997	Coconut Grove Convention Center, Miami, Florida, U.S.	Retained WBA middleweight title
24	Win	23–0–1	Ray McElroy	TKO	7 (12), 1:41	Oct 19, 1996	The Show Place Arena, Upper Marlboro, Maryland, U.S.	Retained WBA middleweight title
23	Win	22–0–1	Shinji Takehara	TKO	9 (12), 2:29	Jun 24, 1996	Yokohama Arena, Yokohama, Japan	Won WBA middleweight title
22	Win	21–0–1	Dave Boone	TKO	2 (10), 1:42	Feb 10, 1996	MGM Grand Garden Arena, Paradise, Nevada, U.S.	
21	Win	20–0–1	Israel Figueroa	KO	1	Dec 7, 1995	The Show Place Arena, Upper Marlboro, Maryland, U.S.	
20	Draw	19–0–1	Rodney Toney	MD	12	Sep 16, 1995	The Mirage, Paradise, Nevada, U.S.	For NABF middleweight title
19	Win	19–0	Joaquin Velasquez	PTS	10	Apr 29, 1995	USAir Arena, Landover, Maryland, U.S.	
18	Win	18–0	Tony McCrimmion	KO	3 (10), 2:02	Mar 1, 1995	War Memorial Auditorium, Fort Lauderdale, Florida, U.S.	
17	Win	17–0	Tony Cartel	KO	2	Sep 20, 1994	Washington, D.C., U.S.	
16	Win	16–0	Richard Evans	PTS	8	Aug 13, 1994	Convention Hall, Atlantic City, New Jersey, U.S.	
15	Win	15–0	Miguel Angel Hernandez	KO	3 (6), 1:08	Jul 30, 1994	Silver Nugget, North Las Vegas, Nevada, U.S.	
14	Win	14–0	Carlos Christie	PTS	6	Jun 15, 1994	Elephant and Castle Shopping Center, London, England	
13	Win	13–0	Carl Sullivan	TKO	4	May 13, 1994	The Show Place Arena, Upper Marlboro, Maryland, U.S.	
12	Win	12–0	Muhammad Shabazz	TKO	5	Apr 14, 1994	Richmond, Virginia, U.S.	
11	Win	11–0	Kenneth Parker	KO	2	Apr 8, 1994	The Show Place Arena, Upper Marlboro, Maryland, U.S.	
10	Win	10–0	Tony McCrimmion	TKO	2	Feb 27, 1994	Circus Maximus Showroom, Atlantic City, New Jersey, U.S.	
9	Win	9–0	Robert Harris	KO	1	Feb 17, 1994	The Show Place Arena, Upper Marlboro, Maryland, U.S.	
8	Win	8–0	Willie Taylor	TKO	3	Jan 7, 1994	The Show Place Arena, Upper Marlboro, Maryland, U.S.	
7	Win	7–0	Tyrone Haywood	KO	2	Oct 21, 1993	Washington, D.C., U.S.	
6	Win	6–0	Ivory Teague	KO	2	Sep 25, 1993	Prince George's Community College, Largo, Maryland, U.S.	
5	Win	5–0	George Taylor	KO	3	Aug 13, 1993	Prince George's Community College, Largo, Maryland, U.S.	
4	Win	4–0	Tim Tisdale	KO	1	Jun 18, 1993	Total Sports Pavilion, Woodbridge, Virginia, U.S.	
3	Win	3–0	Shane Martin	TKO	3 (4), 2:29	May 12, 1993	Baltimore Arena, Baltimore, Maryland, U.S.	
2	Win	2–0	Ken Ruffin	TKO	1	Apr 30, 1993	Total Sports Pavilion, Woodbridge, Virginia, U.S.	
1	Win	1–0	Dwayne Tennet	UD	4	Feb 26, 1993	Camp Hill, Pennsylvania, U.S.	Professional debut

Sporting positions
Minor world boxing titles
New title	WBA (Regular) middleweight champion November 17, 2001 – December 13, 2003; Lost bid for Super title	Vacant Title next held by Maselino Masoe
Major world boxing titles
Preceded by Shinji Takehara	WBA middleweight champion June 24, 1996 – August 23, 1997	Succeeded by Julio César Green
Preceded by Julio César Green	WBA middleweight champion January 31, 1998 – May 12, 2001	Succeeded by Félix Trinidad
