= Peter McNeeley =

American boxer (born 1968)

Personal information
- Nickname: Hurricane
- Born: Peter Smith McNeeley; 6 October 1968 (age 58) Medfield, Massachusetts, U.S.
- Height: 6 ft 2 in (188 cm)
- Weight: Heavyweight

Boxing career
- Reach: 77 in (196 cm)
- Stance: Orthodox

Boxing record
- Total fights: 54
- Wins: 47
- Win by KO: 36
- Losses: 7
Medal record
Men's amateur boxing
New England Golden Gloves
Gold medal – first place	1989 Lowell	Heavyweight

Peter McNeeley (born 6 October 1968) is an American former heavyweight boxer. He is best known for facing Mike Tyson in Tyson's first fight after his release from prison in 1995.

== Early life ==
John Peter Smith McNeeley was born on 6 October 1968 in Medfield, Massachusetts, U.S.; the child of Nancy McNeeley, (née Gray) (1944–2018) and Tom McNeeley (1937–2011). McNeeley grew up in Medfield, alongside his three brothers Bryan, Tom, and Shawn. His father was a former heavyweight contender who challenged Floyd Patterson for the world heavyweight championship, and later served eight years as the boxing commissioner of the Massachusetts State Boxing Commission. McNeeley's grandfather, Thomas McNeeley Sr. was a New England boxing champion and fought on the 1928 Olympic boxing team. McNeeley graduated from Bridgewater State College with a bachelors degree in political science.

== Early boxing and amateur career ==
McNeeley became interested in boxing at age seven after finding a box of his father's boxing memorabilia, including his father's November 1961 Sports Illustrated cover. His parents split when he was 10 years old, during his visits with his father he began getting involved in sport of boxing with his father taking him and his younger brother to the Catholic Youth Organization program in Newton, Massachusetts, additionally he would train with the equipment his father had at his house.

McNeeley then stepped away from boxing during high school instead focusing his time playing on the school’s football team. During his first year at Bridgewater State College, he struggled academically and was later readmitted on academic probation. This is when he decided to start boxing once again to help eliminate alcohol and drugs from his life.

McNeeley had 21 amateur fights, finishing his amateur career with the record 15–6. Albeit a brief amateur career, he successfully represented the United States, wherein he defeated Wayne Bernard, the world Maritime heavyweight champion; and the first round knockout of No. 1 ranked US amateur James Johnson. He won the New England Golden Gloves in Lowell, Massachusetts in 1989 and the New England Diamond Belt Tournament later that year.

== Pro career ==
During his last year of college in 1987, McNeeley met his manager Vinnie Vecchione who had been out of the fight game for nearly a decade. McNeeley stated "Vinnie basically taught me how to fight all over again. Between my heart and my determination and Vinnie's teaching, I got better even quicker now."

McNeeley made his pro debut on August 23, 1991 at Nickerson Field in Boston, Massachusetts, where he defeated Van Dorsey by technical knockout in the first round after 50 seconds. McNeeley fought two more times in 1991, both in his home state of Massachusetts. The first came on October 24, where he got a first round TKO of Fabian Arroyo, he then scored another first round TKO vs. Kevin Chisolm on December 7. He started out 1992 with another first round TKO over Phil Prince on February 15. This was shortly followed by two more round one TKO’s in his following bouts. His next fight vs John Basil Jackson on June 13, was his first to go the distance and was won via PTS after four rounds, breaking his streak of 13 straight Knockouts to start his career. His next fight came just 6 days later vs. Jimmy Harrison which he won via unanimous decision, he then rematched Harrison 2 months later and scored a third round TKO.

McNeeley fought 4 more times from September 28 to December 10, scoring 3 more KOs in the process and improving his record to 13-0. His first bout of 1993 came on January 30, vs. Ron Drinkwater where he scored yet another first round TKO. His next 6 fights also ended via stoppage improving his record to 20-0. He then fought three more times from September 10, to November 24 all resulting in unanimous decision victories. Following a first round TKO victory vs. Larry Davis on January 21, 1994 Neely then got his first title shot vs. Stanley Wright for the then vacant USA New England heavyweight title. The bout which took place on February 18, seen McNeeley suffer the first loss of his career via a 8 round TKO. McNeeley then bounced back scoring 3 straight TKO victories bringing his record to 28-1. In June 1994 McNeeley signed with Don King Productions, he then followed this up with one of his biggest wins of his career on June 24, when he scored a second round RTD victory over the former WBC light heavyweight champ J. B. Williamson. Following two more KO victories McNeeley then faced Williamson in a rematch and once again beat him via first round KO.

Following Williamson rematch McNeeley won an additional 5 bouts all by TKO/KO, with a record of 36-1. During this time he also had his first nationwide exposure on Showtime, March 17, 1995. The St. Patrick's Day boxing special was held in Worcester, Massachusetts, where he faced Danny Lee Wofford and got a second round KO. He also set an at the time world record for fastest knockout in a pro match on April 22, 1995 when he KO Frankie Hines in 6 seconds.

McNeeley was originally scheduled to get a WBC World Heavyweight title shot vs Oliver McCall following McCall’s upset win over Lennox Lewis, however organization blocked the bout due to McNeeley not being ranked in the top 10 at that point.

Around the time of his fight with Mike Tyson he had gained a No. 7 ranking by the World Boxing Association and a No. 10 rank by the WBC by early 1995.

=== Fight with Mike Tyson ===
Main Article Mike Tyson Vs. Peter McNeeley

Following getting denied a title shot Don King then offered McNeeley a bout vs. Mike Tyson who was set to be released from prison.

McNeeley is best known for his bout with Tyson that took place on August 19, 1995, Tyson’s first fight after being released from prison, before which McNeeley had said he would wrap Tyson in a "cocoon of horror." McNeeley fought aggressively but was knocked down twice within the first two minutes. McNeeley was disqualified after his manager Vinnie Vecchione stepped into the ring to stop his fighter from taking any more punishment after the second knockdown. TV Guide included the fight in their list of the 50 Great TV Sports Moments of All Time in 1998.

Despite losing the bout McNeeley gained decent exposure and started appearing in TV commercials and making speaking appearances.

=== Post Tyson fights ===
Following his bout with Tyson, McNeeley returned to the ring on October 27, 1995 at the TD Garden where he defeated Mike Sams via second round KO to win the USBF heavyweight title. He then fought 3 more times between December 12, 1995 and June 22, 1996 winning all 3 fights by KO. his win streak was then stopped on July 13, 1996 when he was stopped by club fighter Louis Monaco in the fifth round. McNeeley then went on another win streak which was started on August 12, 1996 in a DQ victory over Domingo Monroe an additional four wins came from then till October 8, 1998 three coming via unanimous decision and one by DQ. This brought his record to 43-3 overall.

McNeeley then flew to Denmark for his first international bout to challenged at the time undefeated 47-0 fighter Brian Nielsen on February 12, 1999. He lost the bout via third round KO. He then dropped his following bout to Eric Esch better known as Butterbean on June 26, via first round TKO. McNeeley then took five months off before returning to the ring to face Jeff Jones and quickly won the bout via first round knockout. McNeeley didn’t fight again to June 2000 when he faced Joe Siciliano once again winning by first round KO, this would mark the final win of his career.

McNeeley then faced Henry Akinwande on March 17, 2001 for the vacant WBC International heavyweight title he lost the bout via second round KO. On June 1 of the same year McNeeley travelled to South Africa for his final bout vs. Mike Bernardo for the WBF heavyweight title however he lost the match via first round KO. Putting a end to his 10 year career, he finished with a total record of 47-7 with 36 knockouts.

== Personal life ==
McNeeley has one daughter named Nadiya. His wife Annarita Petrosillo-McNeeley died unexpectedly in 2023. He still resides in Massachusetts and is involved with the local boxing scene.

In 1995, McNeeley was arrested and charged with assault and battery with a dangerous weapon. In March 2006, McNeeley was arrested in Norwood, Massachusetts, after he punched a man and stole his wallet containing $200. In June 2006, McNeeley was arrested for driving the getaway car used in a robbery of a Walgreens in Stoughton, Massachusetts. After searching the car, police recovered $180 in cash and a black fanny pack which had also been stolen from the store. The charges were later reduced to larceny.

== Titles in boxing ==
=== Regional titles ===
- USBF heavyweight Champion (one time)

=== Amateur titles ===
- New England Golden Gloves Heavyweight Champion 1989
- New England Diamond Belt Tournament Champion 1989

== Professional boxing record ==
54 fights	47 wins	7 losses
By knockout	36	6
By decision	9	0
By disqualification	2	1

No.	Result	Record	Opponent	Type	Round, time	Date	Location	Notes
54	Loss	47–7	Mike Bernardo	TKO	1 (12), 0:41	8 Jun 2001	Grand West Casino, Cape Town, Western Cape, South Africa	For WBF heavyweight title
53	Loss	47–6	Henry Akinwande	KO	2 (12), 2:05	17 Mar 2001	The Moon, Tallahassee, Florida, U.S.	For WBC International heavyweight title
52	Win	47–5	Joe Siciliano	TKO	1 (4), 2:57	17 Jun 2000	Leominster Armory, Leominster, Massachusetts, U.S.	
51	Win	46–5	Jeff Jones	TKO	1 (10), 1:05	18 Nov 1999	Gold Strike Tunica, Tunica Resorts, Mississippi, U.S.	
50	Loss	45–5	Eric Esch	TKO	1 (4), 2:59	26 Jun 1999	Mandalay Bay, Paradise, Nevada, U.S.	
49	Loss	45–4	Brian Nielsen	KO	3 (8), 1:54	12 Feb 1999	Falkoner Center, Copenhagen, Denmark	
48	Win	45–3	Harry Funmaker	UD	6	8 Oct 1998	Harrah's North Kansas City, North Kansas City, Missouri, U.S.	
47	Win	44–3	Dan Kosmicki	UD	6	17 Apr 1998	Mohegan Sun, Uncasville, Connecticut, U.S.	
46	Win	43–3	Larry Menefee	DQ	8 (8), 2:19	10 Jan 1998	Sportsmen's Lodge, Studio City, California, U.S.	
45	Win	42–3	Doug Davis	UD	6	5 Dec 1997	The Roxy, Boston, Massachusetts, U.S.	
44	Win	41–3	Domingo Monroe	DQ	4 (10), 1:03	12 Aug 1996	Saratoga City Center, Saratoga Springs, New York, U.S.	
43	Loss	40–3	Louis Monaco	TKO	5 (6), 2:57	13 Jul 1996	Mammoth Events Center, Denver, Colorado, U.S.	
42	Win	40–2	Marc Machain	TKO	1 (6)	22 Jun 1996	Whitman Armory, Whitman, Massachusetts, U.S.	
41	Win	39–2	Juan Quintana	KO	2 (6), 0:46	27 Apr 1996	Whitman Armory, Whitman, Massachusetts, U.S.	
40	Win	38–2	Harold Reitman	TKO	1 (10), 2:32	12 Dec 1995	Charlotte Memorial Auditorium, Punta Gorda, Florida, U.S.	
39	Win	37–2	Mike Sams	KO	2 (12), 1:43	27 Oct 1995	TD Garden, Boston, Massachusetts, U.S.	Won USBF heavyweight title
38	Loss	36–2	Mike Tyson	DQ	1 (10), 1:29	19 Aug 1995	MGM Grand Las Vegas, Paradise, Nevada, U.S.	McNeeley was disqualified after his manager entered the ring
37	Win	36–1	Frankie Hines	TKO	1 (10), 0:06	22 Apr 1995	Hot Springs Convention Auditorium, Hot Springs, Arkansas, U.S.	
36	Win	35–1	Danny Wofford	RTD	1 (10), 3:00	17 Mar 1995	Worcester Memorial Auditorium, Worcester, Massachusetts, U.S.	
35	Win	34–1	Jerry Barnes	KO	1 (8), 2:38	10 Feb 1995	Fort Smith Convention Center, Fort Smith, Arkansas, U.S.	
34	Win	33–1	Kevin Wyrick	TKO	1 (8), 1:22	20 Jan 1995	Foxboro Raceway, Boston, Massachusetts, U.S.	
33	Win	32–1	Lorenzo Boyd	TKO	1 (8), 1:22	11 Nov 1994	Foxborough Raceway, Foxborough, Massachusetts, U.S.	
32	Win	31–1	J.B. Williamson	TKO	1 (8), 1:01	8 Oct 1994	Whitman Armory, Whitman, Massachusetts, U.S.	
31	Win	30–1	Quinton Hardy	KO	1 (8), 2:50	29 Aug 1994	Louisville Gardens, Louisville, Kentucky, U.S.	
30	Win	29–1	Dwayne Hall	TKO	1 (8), 2:25	22 Jul 1994	Memorial Hall, Plymouth, Massachusetts, U.S.	
29	Win	28–1	J.B. Williamson	RTD	2 (10), 3:00	24 Jun 1994	Foxborough Raceway, Foxborough, Massachusetts, U.S.	
28	Win	27–1	Wayne Perdue	TKO	1 (6), 1:20	30 Apr 1994	Whitman Armory, Whitman, Massachusetts, U.S.	
27	Win	26–1	Lopez McGee	TKO	1 (8)	13 Apr 1994	The Ritz, Raleigh, North Carolina, U.S.	
26	Win	25–1	Herman Jackson	TKO	2 (8)	8 Apr 1994	Fort Smith, Arkansas, U.S.	
25	Loss	24–1	Stanley Wright	TKO	8 (10), 1:49	18 Feb 1994	Westin Hotel, Boston, Massachusetts, U.S.	For vacant USA New England heavyweight title
24	Win	24–0	Larry Davis	TKO	1 (8), 1:40	21 Jan 1994	Sheraton Inn, Lowell, Massachusetts, U.S.	
23	Win	23–0	Howard Kelly	UD	8	24 Nov 1993	Robarts Arena, Sarasota, Florida, U.S.	
22	Win	22–0	Dwayne Hall	UD	6	6 Nov 1993	Foxborough Raceway, Foxborough, Massachusetts, U.S.	
21	Win	21–0	Juan Quintana	UD	8	10 Sep 1993	Wonderland Greyhound Park, Revere, Massachusetts, U.S.	
20	Win	20–0	Robert Pagan Perez	RTD	2 (6)	14 Aug 1993	Whitman Armory, Whitman, Massachusetts, U.S.	
19	Win	19–0	Miguel Rosa	TKO	2 (8), 1:55	7 Jun 1993	Wonderland Greyhound Park, Revere, Massachusetts, U.S.	
18	Win	18–0	Marc Machain	KO	7 (8), 1:40	8 May 1993	Foxborough Raceway, Foxborough, Massachusetts, U.S.	
17	Win	17–0	Phil Prince	TKO	1 (6)	9 Apr 1993	Whitman Armory, Whitman, Massachusetts, U.S.	
16	Win	16–0	John Basil Jackson	TKO	5 (6), 2:55	5 Mar 1993	Whitman Armory, Whitman, Massachusetts, U.S.	
15	Win	15–0	Jesus Rohena	TKO	2 (6), 1:11	20 Feb 1993	Foxborough Raceway, Foxborough, Massachusetts, U.S.	
14	Win	14–0	Ron Drinkwater	TKO	1 (8), 2:08	30 Jan 1993	National Guard Armory, Chelsea, Massachusetts, U.S.	
13	Win	13–0	Jimmy Harrison	UD	6	10 Dec 1992	Teachers Union Hall, Boston, Massachusetts, U.S.	
12	Win	12–0	Lorenzo Poole	KO	2 (6)	13 Nov 1992	Foxborough Raceway, Foxborough, Massachusetts, U.S.	
11	Win	11–0	Shawn Bryant	TKO	1 (6)	21 Oct 1992	Westin Hotel, Boston, Massachusetts, U.S.	
10	Win	10–0	Van Dorsey	TKO	1 (5), 1:02	28 Sep 1992	Vista International Hotel, Waltham, Massachusetts, U.S.	
9	Win	9–0	Jimmy Harrison	TKO	3 (6)	12 Sep 1992	Wonderland Greyhound Park, Revere, Massachusetts, U.S.	
8	Win	8–0	Jimmy Harrison	UD	4	19 Jun 1992	Somerville, Massachusetts, U.S.	
7	Win	7–0	John Basil Jackson	PTS	4	13 Jun 1992	Mount Carmel Recreation Center, Worcester, Massachusetts, U.S.	
6	Win	6–0	Jerry Arentzen	TKO	1 (4), 2:15	23 Apr 1992	Foxwoods Resort Casino, Mashantucket, Connecticut, U.S.	
5	Win	5–0	Jesus Rohena	TKO	1 (4), 0:40	28 Feb 1992	Westin Hotel, Boston, Massachusetts, U.S.	
4	Win	4–0	Phil Prince	TKO	1 (4), 2:39	15 Feb 1992	Brockton High School Gymnasium, Brockton, Massachusetts, U.S.	
3	Win	3–0	Kevin Chisolm	TKO	1 (4), 1:51	7 Dec 1991	Bank Street Armory, Fall River, Massachusetts, U.S.	
2	Win	2–0	Fabian Arroyo	TKO	1 (4), 0:24	24 Oct 1991	DCU Center, Worcester, Massachusetts, U.S.	
1	Win	1–0	Van Dorsey	KO	1 (4), 0:50	23 Aug 1991	Nickerson Field, Boston, Massachusetts, U.S.	

== Pay-per-view bouts ==
Date	Fight	Billing	Buys	Network
August 19, 1995	Tyson vs. McNeeley	He's Back	1,600,000	Showtime/King Vision
