= Middleweight World Championship Series =

Boxing competitions

The Middleweight World Championship Series was a boxing round-robin tournament staged by Don King Productions. The goal of the series was to produce a unified Middleweight boxing champion. The victor took the WBC, WBA, IBF and vacant Ring Magazine 160-pound belts home, and became the first undisputed middleweight king since Marvellous Marvin Hagler held the distinction from 1979 until 1987. The victor was also awarded a specially commissioned "Sugar" Ray Robinson trophy.

The contenders in the tournament were William Joppy (WBA champion), Keith Holmes (WBC champion), Bernard Hopkins (IBF champion), and Félix Trinidad. The semifinals pitted Trinidad against Joppy and Hopkins against Holmes. Trinidad was regarded as the favourite to win the tournament.

== Hopkins vs Holmes ==
On April 14, 2001, in Madison Square Garden, New York, Hopkins won a unanimous decision over Keith Holmes to unify the WBC and IBF titles. The judges scorecards read 118-109, 117-110 and 119-108 all in favor of Hopkins.

== Joppy vs Trinidad ==
The bout took place on May 12 2001 at Madison Square Garden, New York. In the first round Joppy came out on the offensive, but late in the round Trinidad scored a knockdown with a combination of punches that came close to throwing Joppy underneath the ropes. Trinidad subsequently scored a knockdown in the fourth round, In the fifth round Trinidad scored another knockdown, Joppy attempted to continue the fight, but while he was using the ropes to help him stand, the referee stopped the contest. After the fight was over, Trinidad explained his strategy by stating: "I knew he wanted to impose his will, his weight, and I wouldn't let him do it".

== Hopkins vs Trinidad ==
The finale pitted Bernard Hopkins vs. Felix Trinidad. Hopkins vs. Trinidad took place on September 29, 2001 in Madison Square Garden. For the first time in many years, Hopkins was an underdog in the betting, which led the confident Hopkins to place a $100,000 bet on himself to win the bout. (The $100K came from a sponsorship deal Hopkins had with online casino site Golden Palace; Hopkins even had the GoldenPalace.com website displayed on his back for the fight. During promotion for the bout, Hopkins caused huge controversy by throwing the Puerto Rico flag on the floor in press conferences in both New York and Puerto Rico, the latter conference leading to a riot in which Hopkins had to be run to safety from the angry mob.

During the fight, Hopkins was on his way to a lopsided decision victory when, in the 12th and final round, he floored Trinidad. Referee Steve Smoger called a halt to the fight after Trinidad's father entered the ring to stop the fight. It was the first loss of Trinidad's career. Hopkins was victorious becoming undisputed middleweight champion with a 12th Round TKO.

Awards
Previous: Oscar De La Hoya vs. Shane Mosley	The Ring Event of the Year; 2001	Next: Lennox Lewis vs. Mike Tyson press conference brawl
