= Yuri Foreman =

Israeli boxer (born 1980)

Yuri Foreman יורי פורמן
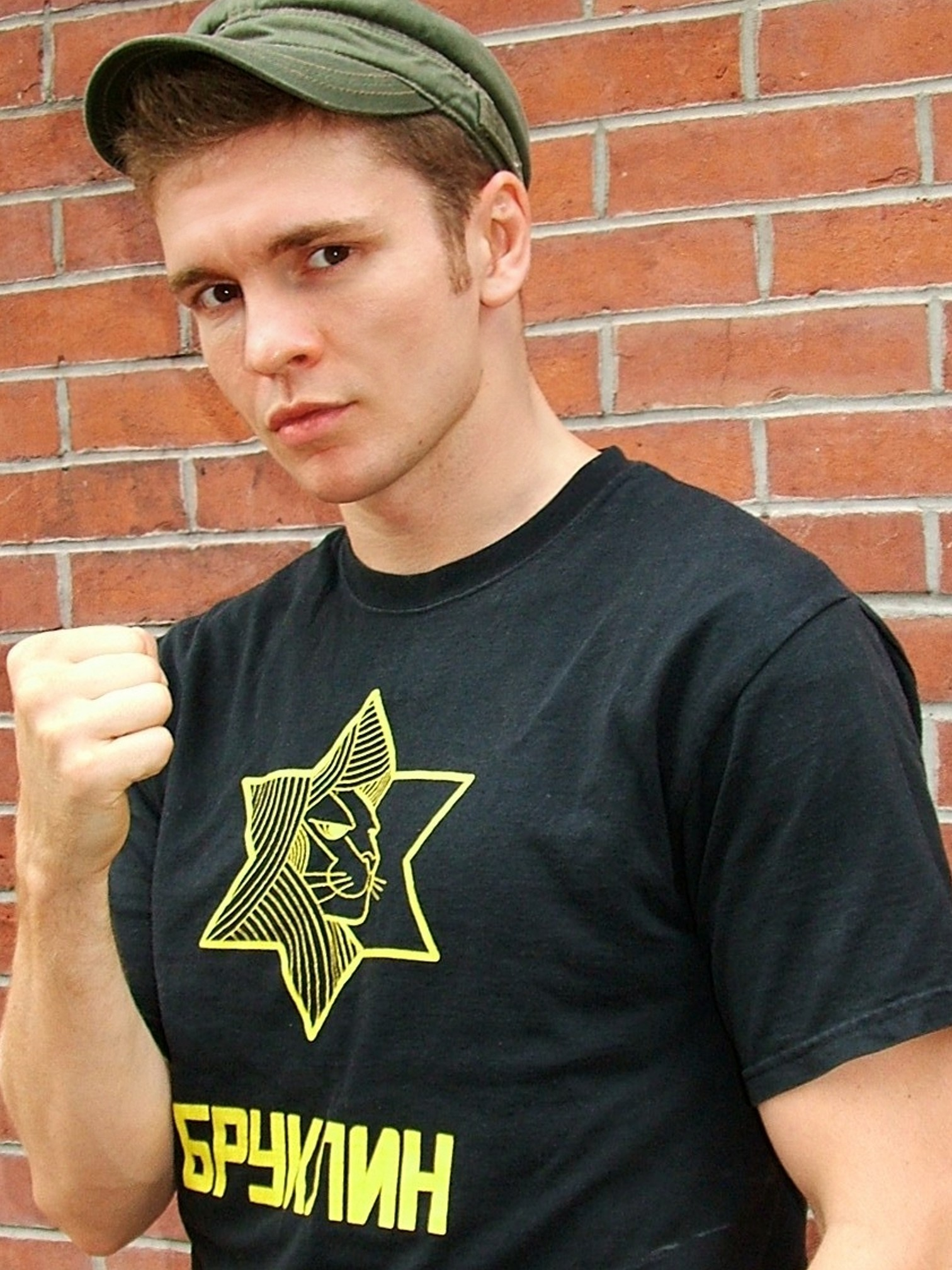
- Foreman in 2008

Personal information
- Nationality: Israeli
- Born: August 5, 1980 (age 46) Gomel, Byelorussian Soviet Socialist Republic, USSR
- Height: 5 ft 11 in (180 cm)
- Weight: Light middleweight

Boxing career
- Reach: 72 in (183 cm)
- Stance: Orthodox

Boxing record
- Total fights: 40
- Wins: 35
- Win by KO: 10
- Losses: 4
- No contests: 1

Yuri Foreman (Hebrew: יורי פורמן; born August 5, 1980) is an Israeli professional boxer who held the WBA super welterweight title from 2009 to 2010. He was born in Gomel, Belarus, but boxed out of Brooklyn, New York. Foreman has also pursued Jewish religious studies during his boxing career, and in 2014 was ordained as a rabbi. He has been referred to as the "Boxing Rabbi."

== Early years ==
Yuri Foreman was born in Gomel, in Belarus, then part of the Soviet Union. He started out as a swimmer, but his mother signed him up for boxing lessons at age seven after he experienced bullying and beatings. At age nine, he immigrated with his family to Israel. Boxing was not popular in Israel and there were few boxing gyms so he trained at an Arab gym. On his early days in boxing, Foreman said:

The first time I walked in, I saw the stares. In their eyes, there was a lot of hatred. But I needed to box; and boy, did they all want to box me. After a while, the wall that was between us melted. We all wanted the same thing. I traveled with them as teammates. It helped that I won almost all the time. And finally, we became friends."

In Israel he became an amateur boxer and won three national boxing championships. In 1999, Foreman moved to Brooklyn, New York City. He stated that the only reason he came to the United States was to pursue his dream of a professional boxing career, and saw no further opportunity to do so in Israel. His first job was in the Garment District in Manhattan, where he made deliveries and swept the floors for a clothing store. At the same time, he began training at Gleason's Gym in Brooklyn, where he met his first wife, Leyla Leidecker. The couple later divorced. During this period of time was when he found a Brooklyn Heights synagogue while in search of enlightenment. He was quoted saying, "As I was maturing, as a person and a fighter, I realized that I needed some sort of spiritual center to achieve things physically, especially in boxing where you need to have good spiritual form and good physical form. I needed an outlet — a spiritual backbone, so I could push myself better, channel my energy, be more present." He embarked on the long road to becoming a rabbi and was eventually ordained under the tutelage of Rabbi Dovber Pinson.

== Amateur career ==
In 2000, Foreman lost the New York Golden Gloves in the final, but came back in 2001 to win the tournament. During his amateur career, Foreman compiled a 75–5 record.

== Professional career ==
At the onset of his professional career, Foreman's management team was unsuccessful procuring appropriate fights. Foreman struggled financially. Around 2004, Foreman met Murray Wilson who became his manager. Wilson signed Foreman up with Bob Arum's Top Rank promotion company.

=== Light middleweight ===
On June 3, 2006, Foreman defeated Jesus Felipe Valverde, but tore ligaments in his left hand in the process. His next scheduled fight was June 9, 2007 facing the favored Anthony Thompson (23 (17 KOs)-2-0) of Philadelphia in Madison Square Garden on the undercard of the Miguel Cotto–Zab Judah fight. Prior to the fight, Foreman moved his training grounds from Gleason's Gym in Brooklyn to Joe Grier's gym in Paterson, New Jersey. Foreman won a tactical 10-round split decision, with the scores 97–93 and 96–94 for Foreman, and 96–94 for Thompson. In September 2007, he was ranked as the 8th-best welterweight (67 kg, or 147 pounds) challenger by the World Boxing Association.

In December 2007, Foreman won a 10-round split decision over Andrey Tsurkan (25–3; 16 KOs), to take the North American Boxing Federation super welterweight title from him at the Paradise Theater on Grand Concourse in The Bronx, New York City.

In April 2008 he beat 28–4–0 Saúl Román in a unanimous decision. While training for the fight, he was also studying to become a rabbi. In October 2008, he defeated Vinroy Barrett (22–7, 11 KOs) from Kingston, Jamaica on the Pavlik-Hopkins undercard.

Foreman defeated James Moore (16–1; 10 KOs), in a 10-round unanimous decision for Foreman's NABF title at Boardwalk Hall in Atlantic City on December 13, 2008. In the five outings leading up to the Moore fight, Foreman won decisions over fighters with a cumulative record of 118–17–2.

==== WBA super welterweight champion ====
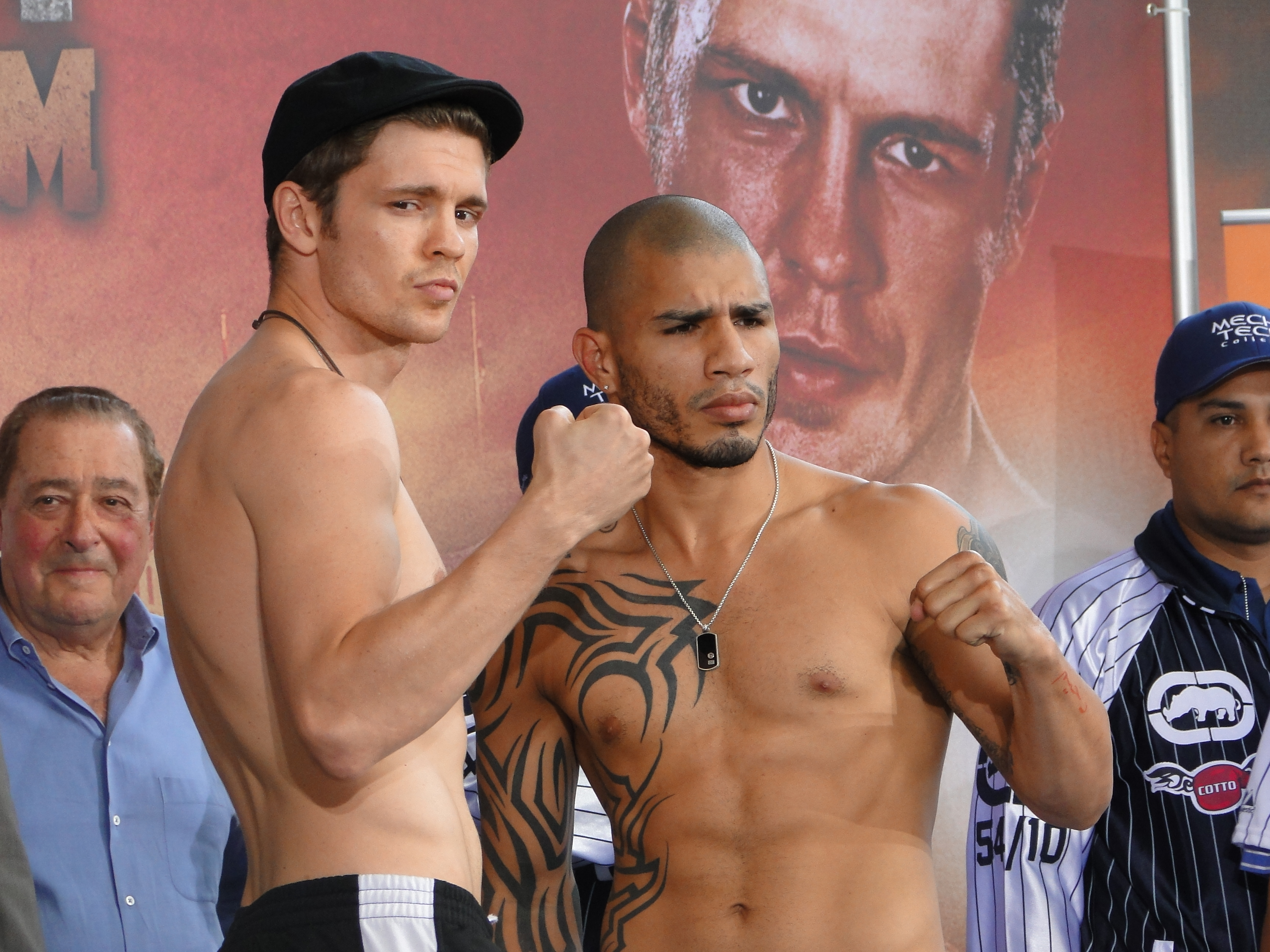
Foreman and Miguel Cotto at their weigh-in, 2010

On November 14, 2009, Foreman defeated Daniel Santos by a 12-round unanimous decision to become the new WBA super welterweight champion and Israel's first WBA champion. He also became Israel's first world boxing champion. In early January 2010, Foreman began talks with Bob Arum to arrange for himself and Filipino boxer seven-division world champion Manny Pacquiao, to meet on March 13, 2010. However, Pacquiao rejected the offer.

Foreman fought Miguel Cotto on June 5, 2010, the first fight to take place at the new Yankee Stadium. Foreman went down from a slip in the 7th round when his already braced, right knee buckled. He got back to his feet and continued fighting despite heavily favoring the knee. After a few more falls from the knee giving out and Cotto beginning to land, Foreman's trainer Joe Grier threw in the towel midway through the 8th round. The ring filled with both camps and officials. Cotto and Foreman embraced, thinking it was over. Feeling that Foreman was in no immediate danger, however, Referee Arthur Mercante Jr. asked him if he wanted to continue, and he did. While the crowd was not sure what was happening, the ring was cleared after a delay of a couple of minutes and the fight resumed with about half the round remaining. Cotto landed a left hook to the body and Foreman went down 42 seconds into the 9th round and Mercante called off the fight. In interviews after the fight, Cotto said "He was working on one leg, but I still kept fighting."

When asked why he continued after injuring his leg, Foreman said: "I'm a world champion – now a former world champion – and you don't just quit ... A world champion needs to keep on fighting." A week after the fight, Foreman underwent surgery on his right knee to repair a torn ACL and Meniscus and to remove torn cartilage around his knee joint. The injury which had occurred when he was 15 years old, was aggravated during the bout. Foreman was told by doctors to take off for a year, but was boxing again nine months later. On March 2, 2011, he battled Polish Light Middleweight boxer Pawel Wolak, and lost. Shortly after the fight, Foreman said he wasn't sure if he was going to continue fighting or retire.

After a 22-month layoff, Foreman was victorious in his return to the ring on Lou DiBella's Broadway Boxing card at BB Kings in Manhattan, New York on January 23, 2013. Yuri won the 6-round bout by unanimous decision. On April 4, 2013, Foreman again emerged victorious by winning a six-round bout. He defeated Gundrick King by unanimous decision in the junior middleweight division at the Roseland Ballroom in NYC.

Foreman began teaching boxing classes in the famous Gleason's Gym in Brooklyn New York in 2020.

== Jewish heritage and rabbinic studies ==
Foreman, "the first Orthodox Jew to own a world title since Barney Ross held championships in two divisions in 1935", is one of three top contemporary Jewish boxers. The others are Dmitry Salita (30–1–1), a junior welterweight, and heavyweight Roman Greenberg (27–1–0).

"I thought at first that people were pulling my leg. Mike Marley said that Yuri was becoming a Rabbi. But that's true, he is. So I see Jim Borzell out there, and Jim handles John Duddy. 'So,' I said to Borzell, 'can you get John to go to Seminary? What a fight, a Priest against a Rabbi, and I'll get somebody from Nevada who's Mormon to referee the fight.'"

— Bob Arum

In the post-fight interview of his December 2007 win over Andrey Tsurkan, Foreman raised his hands and wished the television audience a happy Chanukah. Foreman, who wears a Star of David on his boxing trunks, is an aspiring rabbi. "Boxing is sometimes spiritual in its own way", he said. "You have the physical and mental challenges in boxing, just like you have lots of challenges in exploring the different levels of Judaism. They are different but the same."

Foreman studied the Talmud and Jewish mysticism in the morning, trains for boxing in the afternoon and attended rabbinical classes twice a week at the IYYUN Institute, a Jewish educational center in Gowanus. "Yuri is a very good student", said Rabbi DovBer Pinson, an author and lecturer who is Foreman's teacher. "Most people (in the class) who find out that he's a boxer are very surprised. He doesn't have that boxing personality, at least in the perception of what a boxer is. He's not the rough kid on the block. He's a sweet, easy-going kid."

In 2014, Foreman was ordained as an Orthodox rabbi. He has stated that he intends to return to Israel and serve as a rabbi there, and occasionally leave Israel to box abroad.

== Professional boxing record ==
40 fights	35 wins	4 losses
By knockout	10	3
By decision	25	1
No contests	1	

No.	Result	Record	Opponent	Type	Round, time	Date	Location	Notes
40	Loss	35–4 (1)	Jimmy Williams	MD	8	Jun 19, 2021	Buckhead Fight Club, Atlanta, Georgia U.S.	For vacant ABF USA and UBO International light middleweight titles
39	Win	35–3 (1)	Jeremy Ramos	SD	8	Dec 5, 2020	Kentucky Center for African American Heritage, Louisville, Kentucky, U.S.	
38	Loss	34–3 (1)	Erislandy Lara	KO	4 (12), 1:47	Jan 13, 2017	Park Race Track, Hialeah, Florida, U.S.	For WBA and IBO light middleweight titles
37	Win	34–2 (1)	Jason Davis	TKO	2 (8), 1:55	Jun 3, 2016	Resorts World, New York City, New York, U.S.	
36	Win	33–2 (1)	Lenwood Dozier	UD	8	Dec 5, 2015	Barclays Center, New York City, New York, U.S.	
35	Win	32–2 (1)	Jovany Javier Gomez	KO	1 (8), 1:56	Nov 12, 2013	Hard Rock Live, Hollywood, Florida, U.S.	
34	Win	31–2 (1)	Jamaal Davis	UD	8	Jul 24, 2013	Roseland Ballroom, New York City, New York, U.S.	
33	Win	30–2 (1)	Gundrick King	UD	6	Apr 4, 2013	Roseland Ballroom, New York City, New York, U.S.	
32	Win	29–2 (1)	Brandon Baue	UD	6	Jan 23, 2013	B.B. King Blues Club & Grill, New York City, New York, U.S.	
31	Loss	28–2 (1)	Paweł Wolak	RTD	6 (10), 3:00	Mar 12, 2011	MGM Grand Garden Arena, Paradise, Nevada, U.S.	
30	Loss	28–1 (1)	Miguel Cotto	TKO	9 (12), 0:42	Jun 5, 2010	Yankee Stadium, New York City, New York, U.S.	Lost WBA light middleweight title
29	Win	28–0 (1)	Daniel Santos	UD	12	Nov 14, 2009	MGM Grand Garden Arena, Paradise, Nevada, U.S.	Won WBA light middleweight title
28	NC	27–0 (1)	Cornelius Bundrage	NC	3 (12)	Jun 27, 2009	Boardwalk Hall, Atlantic City, New Jersey, U.S.	NC after Foreman cut from accidental head clash
27	Win	27–0	James Moore	UD	10	Dec 13, 2008	Boardwalk Hall, Atlantic City, New Jersey, U.S.	Retained NABF light middleweight title
26	Win	26–0	Vinroy Barrett	UD	10	Oct 18, 2008	Boardwalk Hall, Atlantic City, New Jersey, U.S.	
25	Win	25–0	Saúl Román	UD	10	Apr 3, 2008	Aviator Sports and Events Center, New York City, New York, U.S.	Retained NABF light middleweight title
24	Win	24–0	Andrey Tsurkan	SD	10	Dec 6, 2007	Paradise Theater, New York City, New York, U.S.	Won NABF light middleweight title
23	Win	23–0	Anthony Thompson	SD	10	Jun 9, 2007	Madison Square Garden, New York City, New York, U.S.	
22	Win	22–0	Donny McCrary	UD	10	Dec 2, 2006	Boardwalk Hall, Atlantic City, New Jersey, U.S.	
21	Win	21–0	Jesus Felipe Valverde	UD	10	Jun 3, 2006	Thomas & Mack Center, Paradise, Nevada, U.S.	
20	Win	20–0	Jimmy LeBlanc	KO	1 (10), 2:49	Feb 4, 2006	BU Castle, Boston, Massachusetts, U.S.	
19	Win	19–0	Troy Lowry	UD	10	Oct 21, 2005	Hard Rock Live, Hollywood, Florida, U.S.	
18	Win	18–0	Kevin Cagle	UD	8	May 6, 2005	Foxwoods Resort Casino, Ledyard, Connecticut, U.S.	
17	Win	17–0	Jesús Soto Karass	UD	8	Feb 24, 2005	Hammerstein Ballroom, New York City, New York, U.S.	
16	Win	16–0	Shakir Ashanti	TKO	2 (6), 1:07	Nov 13, 2004	Madison Square Garden, New York City, New York, U.S.	
15	Win	15–0	Joshua Onyango	UD	6	Jul 23, 2004	Etess Arena, Atlantic City, New Jersey, U.S.	
14	Win	14–0	Calvin Shakir	UD	6	Apr 15, 2004	Hammerstein Ballroom, New York City, New York, U.S.	
13	Win	13–0	Anthony Ivory	UD	6	Jan 16, 2004	Convention Center, Minneapolis, Minnesota, U.S.	
12	Win	12–0	Israel Garcia	UD	8	Oct 24, 2003	Fernwood Resort, Bushkill, Pennsylvania, U.S.	
11	Win	11–0	Sammy Sparkman	UD	6	Jun 3, 2003	Mohegan Sun Arena, Montville, Connecticut, U.S.	
10	Win	10–0	Charles Clark	TKO	2 (8), 1:40	Apr 26, 2003	Foxwoods Resort Casino, Ledyard, Connecticut, U.S.	
9	Win	9–0	James Johnson	TKO	1 (6)	Mar 29, 2003	Spectrum, Philadelphia, Pennsylvania, U.S.	
8	Win	8–0	Will Evans	KO	1 (6), 1:28	Jan 25, 2003	Pechanga Resort & Casino, Temecula, California, U.S.	
7	Win	7–0	Andrey Trunov	UD	6	Jan 10, 2003	Mohegan Sun Arena, Montville, Connecticut, U.S.	
6	Win	6–0	Jose Luis Almanzar	UD	4	Aug 30, 2002	Harry Cipriani Restaurant, New York City, New York, U.S.	
5	Win	5–0	Michael Corleone	TKO	2 (6), 1:40	Jun 20, 2002	Michael's Eighth Avenue, Glen Burnie, Maryland, U.S.	
4	Win	4–0	Michael Doaks	UD	6	Apr 27, 2002	Madison Square Garden, New York City, New York, U.S.	
3	Win	3–0	George Armenta	MD	6	Mar 21, 2002	Michael's Eighth Avenue, Glen Burnie, Maryland, U.S.	
2	Win	2–0	Tommy Attardo	TKO	3 (4)	Mar 15, 2002	Harry Cipriani Restaurant, New York City, New York, U.S.	
1	Win	1–0	Israel Felix	TKO	1 (4)	Jan 24, 2002	Park Central Hotel, New York City, New York, U.S.	

== TV and film ==
Foreman has appeared numerous times in nationally televised fights on ESPN, Showtime, HBO and Versus, and on talk shows such as Jimmy Kimmel Live!. He appeared in the film Fighting, which starred Channing Tatum and Terrence Howard.

== Personal life ==
In 2018 Foreman was married to Shoshanna Hadassah.

== See also ==
- List of Jews in sports#Boxing

Sporting positions
Regional boxing titles
Preceded by Andrey Tsurkan	NABF super welterweight champion December 6, 2007 – June 2009; Vacated	Vacant Title next held by Willie Lee
World boxing titles
Preceded by Daniel Santos	WBA super welterweight champion November 14, 2009 – June 5, 2010	Succeeded by Miguel Cotto
