= Gael Cabrera =

Mexican boxer

Personal information
- Nickname: El Terror
- Nationality: Mexican
- Born: Gael Ezequiel Cabrera Urias; 11 September 2004 (age 21) Ciudad Obregón, Sonora, Mexico
- Height: 5 ft (152 cm) 7
- Weight: Super-bantamweight

Boxing career
- Stance: Orthodox

Boxing record
- Total fights: 8
- Wins: 8
- Win by KO: 5

Gael Cabrera (born 11 September 2004) is a Mexican professional boxer who competes in the super-bantamweight division.

== Amateur career ==
Cabrera had a stellar amateur career winning the State Championship eight times, Mexican national champion three times, and a silver medalist at Youth and Junior World Boxing Championships

== Professional career ==
Cabrera made his pro debut on a Golden Boy card in Indio, California on June 8, 2023. Cabrera dropped his opponent Ulises Gabriel Rosales twice with bodyshots and stopped him in the first round. In his second pro fight against Juan Centeno of Nicaragua, Cabrera was taken the distance but showed great skill over the 4 rounds to easily win on points. Cabrera is regarded as one of the top prospects in the sport.

== Personal life ==
Cabrera was born in Ciudad Obregón, Sonora. His older brother, Misael, is also a boxer.

== Professional boxing record ==
| 8 fights | 8 wins | 0 losses |
|---|---|---|
| By knockout | 5 | 0 |
| By decision | 3 | 0 |

| No. | Result | Record | Opponent | Type | Round, time | Date | Location | Notes |
|---|---|---|---|---|---|---|---|---|
| 8 | Win | 8–0 | (Venezuela) Nelvis Rodriguez | KO | 1 (6), 2:59 | 21 May 2025 | (United States) Ritz Carlton, Marina del Rey, California, U.S. | |
| 7 | Win | 7–0 | (Mexico) Roberto Pucheta | UD | 6 | 15 Feb 2025 | (United States) Honda Center, Anaheim, California, U.S. | |
| 6 | Win | 6–0 | (Philippines) Garen Diagan | KO | 2 (6), 2:59 | 14 Dec 2024 | (United States) Toyota Arena, Ontario, California, U.S. | |
| 5 | Win | 5–0 | (United States) Mychaquell Shields | KO | 3 (6), 1:09 | 6 Jul 2024 | (United States) Toyota Arena, Ontario, California, U.S. | |
| 4 | Win | 4–0 | (United States) Miguel Ceballos | UD | 4 | 27 Jan 2024 | (United States) Footprint Center, Phoenix, Arizona, U. S. | |
| 3 | Win | 3–0 | (United States) Alejandro Dominguez | TKO | 1 (4), 2:16 | 2 Dec 2023 | (United States) Toyota Center, Houston, Texas, U.S. | |
| 2 | Win | 2–0 | (Nicaragua) Juan Centeno | UD | 4 | 16 Sep 2023 | (United States) Commerce Casino, Commerce, California, U.S. | |
| 1 | Win | 1–0 | (Mexico) Ulises Gabriel Rosales | KO | 1 (4), 1:29 | 8 Jun 2023 | (United States) Fantasy Springs Casino, Indio, California, U.S. | |
