= Kofi Jantuah =

Ghanaian boxer

Kofi Jantuah (born 16 June 1974) is a Ghanaian professional boxer that fights at middleweight. He was born in Kumasi, Ghana and now lives in Las Vegas.

== IBF light middleweight title fight ==
Kofi fought Kassim Ouma for the IBF light middleweight world title, where he lost by unanimous decision.

== IBF middleweight title fight ==
Kofi fought Arthur Abraham for the IBF middleweight world title, where he lost by unanimous decision.

== Other notable opponents ==
Kofi has fought Dmitry Pirog, Daniel Santos, Donny McCrary, Jaime Manuel Gomez, and Marco Antonio Rubio with wins against Santos, McCrary, and Rubio.

== Professional boxing record ==
38 fights	32 wins	4 losses
By knockout	21	1
By decision	11	3
Draws	1	
No contests	1	

No.	Result	Record	Opponent	Type	Round, time	Date	Location	More
38	Loss	32–4–1 (1)	(Russia) Dmitry Pirog	UD	12	26 Jun 2009	Hermann-Neuberger-Halle, Völklingen, Germany	For vacant WBC International middleweight title
37	Win	32–3–1 (1)	(Argentina) Ricardo Manuel Genero	TKO	4 (10), 2:02	16 Aug 2008	Baba Yara Stadium, Kumasi, Ghana	
36	Draw	31–3–1 (1)	(Spain) Ruben Diaz	PTS	12	23 Nov 2007	Palacio de los Deportes, Andoain, Spain	For vacant IBF Inter-Continental middleweight title
35	Win	31–3 (1)	(United States) Delray Raines	KO	2 (8), 2:29	7 Apr 2007	(United States) Abou Ben Adhem Shrine Mosque, Springfield, Missouri, U.S.	
34	Loss	30–3 (1)	(Germany) Arthur Abraham	UD	12	13 May 2006	Stadthalle, Zwickau, Germany	For IBF middleweight title
33	Win	30–2 (1)	(United States) Donny McCrary	RTD	3 (8), 3:00	3 Dec 2005	(United States) Mandalay Bay Events Center, Paradise, Nevada, U.S.	
32	Win	29–2 (1)	(Cuba) Hicklet Lau	UD	10	17 Sep 2005	(United States) MGM Grand Garden Arena, Paradise, Nevada, U.S.	
31	Loss	28–2 (1)	(Uganda) Kassim Ouma	UD	12	29 Jan 2005	(United States) Boardwalk Hall, Atlantic City, New Jersey, U.S.	For IBF light middleweight title
30	Win	28–1 (1)	(Mexico) Marco Antonio Rubio	KO	1 (12), 0:33	18 Sep 2004	(United States) MGM Grand Garden Arena, Paradise, Nevada, U.S.	Won WBC International light middleweight title
29	Win	27–1 (1)	(United States) Anthony Bowman	TKO	4 (8), 2:04	17 Jun 2004	(United States) Harrah's Laughlin, Laughlin, Nevada, U.S.	
28	Win	26–1 (1)	(United States) Leon Pearson	TKO	7 (8)	27 Mar 2004	(United States) Alltel Arena, Little Rock, Arkansas, U.S.	
27	Win	25–1 (1)	(Venezuela) Marcos Primera	KO	1 (10), 2:14	24 Oct 2003	(United States) Ramada Inn, Rosemont, Illinois, U.S.	
26	Win	24–1 (1)	(Uganda) Robert Kamya	KO	7 (10), 2:55	8 Aug 2003	(United States) Alltel Arena, Little Rock, Arkansas, U.S.	
25	Win	23–1 (1)	(Brazil) Jose Luis Rodrigues	KO	1 (8), 1:01	24 May 2003	(United States) Reno Hilton, Reno, Nevada, U.S.	
24	Win	22–1 (1)	(United States) Bobby Heath	TKO	8 (10), 1:14	2 Feb 2002	(United States) Sovereign Center, Reading, Pennsylvania, U.S.	
23	Loss	21–1 (1)	(Mexico) Jaime Manuel Gómez	TKO	10 (10), 1:45	30 Jun 2001	(United States) Mandalay Bay Events Center, Paradise, Nevada, U.S.	
22	Win	21–0 (1)	(United Kingdom) Ojay Abrahams	RTD	3 (8), 3:00	7 Oct 2000	(United Kingdom) Doncaster Dome, Doncaster, England	
21	Win	20–0 (1)	(Mexico) Miguel Alejandro Jimenez	TKO	5 (8), 1:20	17 Mar 2000	(United States) Jim Davidson Theatre, Pembroke Pines, Florida, U.S.	
20	Win	19–0 (1)	(United States) Gerald Reed	TKO	3 (8), 2:59	11 Dec 1999	(United States) Grand Casino, Tunica, Mississippi, U.S.	
19	Win	18–0 (1)	(Cuba) Giorbis Barthelemy	UD	8	16 Jul 1999	(United States) Boardwalk Hall, Atlantic City, New Jersey, U.S.	
18	Win	17–0 (1)	(Puerto Rico) Daniel Santos	TKO	5 (10), 2:57	7 May 1999	(United States) All American Sports Park, Las Vegas, Nevada, U.S.	
17	Win	16–0 (1)	(United Kingdom) Gilbert Eastman	TKO	11 (12), 1:49	6 Mar 1999	(United Kingdom) Elephant & Castle Centre, London, England	Retained Commonwealth welterweight title
16	Win	15–0 (1)	(Panama) Santiago Samaniego	UD	10	9 Jan 1999	(United States) New Frontier Hotel and Casino, Paradise, Nevada, U.S.	
15	Win	14–0 (1)	(Mexico) Daniel Mendez	PTS	6	11 Dec 1998	(United States) Events Center, Pueblo, Colorado, U.S.	
14	Win	13–0 (1)	(Dominican Republic) Emiliano Valdez	UD	6	13 Nov 1998	(United States) Miccosukee Resort & Gaming, Miami, Florida, U.S.	
13	Win	12–0 (1)	(Nigeria) Babaloa Johnson	KO	2 (?)	31 Aug 1998	Accra Sports Stadium, Accra, Ghana	
12	Win	11–0 (1)	(Australia) Stefan Scriggins	TKO	1 (12), 2:40	1 Nov 1997	Accra Sports Stadium, Accra, Ghana	Won vacant Commonwealth welterweight title
11	Win	10–0 (1)	(Ghana) Adona Zeba	KO	2 (?)	28 Dec 1996	Accra, Ghana	
10	NC	9–0 (1)	(Ghana) Abraham Tetteh	NC	10 (10)	30 Nov 1996	Accra, Ghana	For Ghanaian welterweight title; Fight ruled NC due to corner intervention
9	Win	9–0	(Ghana) George Ahlijah Foreman	KO	8 (?)	30 Sep 1996	Accra, Ghana	
8	Win	8–0	(Ghana) Nii Hammond	PTS	8	3 Aug 1996	Accra, Ghana	
7	Win	7–0	(Ghana) Marciano Commey	PTS	12	25 Feb 1995	Kaneshie Sports Complex, Accra, Ghana	Retained Ghanaian light welterweight title
6	Win	6–0	(Ghana) Sam Akromah	PTS	12	5 Nov 1994	Accra, Ghana	Won Ghanaian light welterweight title
5	Win	5–0	(Ghana) Sam Akromah	PTS	8	30 Apr 1994	Accra, Ghana	
4	Win	4–0	(Ghana) Joseph Lartey	KO	2 (?)	6 Feb 1994	Accra, Ghana	
3	Win	3–0	(Ghana) Eben Laryea	TKO	2 (?)	6 Nov 1993	Accra, Ghana	
2	Win	2–0	(Ghana) Sully Nguah	PTS	6	8 Aug 1993	Accra, Ghana	
1	Win	1–0	(Ghana) Isaac Nyarko	PTS	6	3 Jul 1993	Kaneshie Sports Complex, Accra, Ghana	

== Accomplishments ==
Kofi is the former holder of the Ghanaian light welterweight title, Commonwealth (British Empire) welterweight title, and the WBC International light middleweight title.

Dmitry Pirog upon his retirement, when asked about his toughest opponent, recalled Jantuah fight as the most difficult:

When I boxed him, he was the most difficult opponent for me, because he set several tasks, which I've been supposed to resolve while taking an avalanche of punches. What tasks they were? First of all, he was rubberlike from my point. When we boxed, I felt I've had a several times higher class as a boxer, I have long amateur career, I have vast experience, but this was a kind of guy, which is very hard to knock out, I don't recall him being ever knocked out . . . Everything I threw connected [shows punches], but those were quick punches, each time I threw a power shot, somehow he slips it.
