= Daniel Santos (boxer) =

Puerto Rican boxer

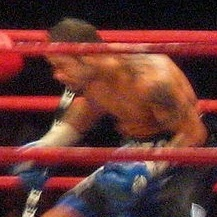
- Santos fights José Antonio Rivera in October 2007

Personal information
- Nickname: El Pillin
- Born: Daniel Santos Peña; October 10, 1975 (age 51) San Juan, Puerto Rico
- Height: 5 ft 11 1/2 in (182 cm)
- Weight: Welterweight; Light middleweight

Boxing career
- Reach: 74 in (188 cm)
- Stance: Southpaw

Boxing record
- Total fights: 38
- Wins: 32
- Win by KO: 23
- Losses: 4
- Draws: 1
- No contests: 1
Medal record
Men's amateur boxing
Representing Puerto Rico
Olympic Games
Bronze medal – third place	1996 Atlanta	Welterweight
Pan American Games
Silver medal – second place	1995 Mar del Plata	Welterweight
Goodwill Games
Bronze medal – third place	1994 Saint Petersburg	Welterweight
Junior World Championships
Bronze medal – third place	1992 Montreal	Light Welterweight

Daniel Santos Peña (born October 10, 1975) is a Puerto Rican former professional boxer who competed from 1996 to 2009. He is a world champion in two weight classes, having held the World Boxing Association (WBO) welterweight title from 2000 to 2001, the WBO light middleweight title from 2002 to 2005, and the World Boxing Association (WBA) light middleweight title from 2008 to 2009. As an amateur, Santos represented Puerto Rico in international events, including the 1990 and 1992 Junior World Championships, Pan American Boxing Tournament, Goodwill Games, 1995 Pan American Games and the 1996 Summer Olympics, where he won a bronze medal at welterweight.

== Amateur career and early life ==
Santos was raised in a family where boxing was a common profession, with his father Paquito Santos being a trainer and his brother Edgardo Santos being a former professional boxer. Early in his life Daniel Santos was enrolled in a school specialized in sports, located in a facility designed for the training of Olympic athletes in Puerto Rico. He eventually graduated from this institution and continued a career in boxing. Santos began to compete in the international amateur circuit in 1990. This year he won the bronze medal in the World Junior Championships that were organized in Lima, Peru. Two years later he competed in the World Junior Championships that were celebrated in Montreal, Quebec, Canada, where he won the bronze medal, for the second straight time in a competition with worldwide scope. On 1993 he debuted in the adult division when he competed in the Panamerican Boxing championship. This event took place in Salinas, Puerto Rico. Santos won the gold medal on this tournament. In 1994 Santos represented Puerto Rico in the Goodwill Games that took place in Saint Petersburg, Russia. Here, Santos finished third in his division and won the bronze medal. His next international participation was in the 1995 Pan American games celebrated in Mar del Plata, Argentina, where he won the silver medal. The result of the championship fight was controversial, when David Reid won the fight by decision after Santos scored a knockdown during the course of the contest. Santos represented Puerto Rico once again at the 1996 Summer Olympics organized in Atlanta, Georgia. Here he competed in three fights, he defeated two adversaries by unanimous decision, these were: Kabil Lahsen of Morocco with score of 16–4 and Nariman Atayev of Uzbekistan with a score of 28–15. In his first fight he defeated Ernest Atangana Mboa of Cameroon by RSC (referee stopping contest) at the 2:54 mark of the first round. His last fight was against Oleg Saitov of Russia where he lost by points with score of 11–13. He finished the competition in the third global place and won the bronze medal, with this medal Santos became the sixth Puerto Rican boxer to win an Olympic medal. Daniel finished his amateur career compiling a record of 117 fights won and three defeats.

== Professional career ==
=== Welterweight ===
Santos debuted as a professional on September 28, 1996, against Andre Hawthorne in Fort Worth, Texas, in a fight where he won by technical knockout in the first round. Following this fight Santos compiled a record of twenty-one victories, one defeat and one draw before competing for a world championship. During this period Santos boxed in the welterweight division, his adversaries in this stage of his career included: Bernard Gray, Miguel Gonzalez, former world title challenger Fidel Avendano, Juan Caslos Rodriguez, William Ruiz and Humberto Rodriguez. The first draw in Santos' career occurred in a fight with Jose Luis Verdugo, that was part of a card that took place in El Cajon, California. On May 7, 1999, Santos competed against Kofi Jantuah in Las Vegas, Nevada. Jantuah won this contest by technical knockout in the fifth round, marking Santos' first defeat in the professional circuit.

==== WBO welterweight title ====
Santos fought Ahmed Kotiev for the World Boxing Organization's welterweight championship on November 27, 1999. Kotiev retained the championship by split decision. The scores of the judges were 115-113 and 115–113 in favor of Kotiev and 117–111 in favor of Santos. The fight was subsequently described as a "competitive and highly entertaining fight" and the result was reviewed as a "disputed" close split decision. On May 6, 2000, these two boxers competed in a rematch of their previous fight. In the fifth round Santos won the fight by knockout, in the process winning his first professional championship, the World Boxing Organization's championship.

On July 21, 2000, Santos defended the welterweight championship against Giovanni Parisi in Calabria, Italy. Santos won the fight by knockout in the fourth round. Following the fight Parisi stated that the welterweight championship was always his interest as he wanted to become the first Italian to win world championships in three different divisions. In this interview he claimed that his training prior to the fight was insufficient. Giovanni said: "We battled in Reggio Calabria, a coin toss from Sicily, and he KOed me during the 4th round. I have no excuses. I didn't train properly."

His second defense was against Neil Sinclair in Yorkshire, Great Britain. In the first round Sinclair's offensive was effective and he scored a knockdown on the defending champion. On the second round Santos responded to Sinclair's strategy and won the fight by knockout. Prior to the fight Sinclair noted that a fight between Santos and him was supposed to happen eight years before, "We were both in the 1992 World junior championships in Montreal. We were both at the same weight and were at other side of the draw from each other and ended up with bronze medals. So I have watched him fight in person and shook hands on the podium. If we had both won our semi-finals we would have faced each other." Sinclair also stated that he expected to win based on his training, he said that all of his sparring partners were southpaws since Santos is one, this preparation also included contracting a new trainer.

On July 21, 2001, Santos defended against Antonio Margarito in a card that took place in Bayamón, Puerto Rico. This marked the first time that Santos fought a world title fight in Puerto Rico. At the moment of the fight Margarito was the mandatory challenger appointed by the World Boxing Organization, and it was televised on Showtime Too. The fight ended in at the 2:11 mark on the first round when the fight was stopped due to a large injury over Margarito's right eye, the cut caused by an accidental head butt. The fight was declared a no-contest and Santos retained the welterweight championship by default. Following the conclusion of the contest both competitors were visibly angered at the sudden conclusion.

=== Light-middleweight ===
==== WBO light-middleweight title ====
Santos boxed for the vacant WBO light-middleweight title against Yori Boy Campas in a fight that took place at Bally's Event Center in Las Vegas, Nevada. Santos won the fight when referee Joe Cortez intervened in the eleventh round. During the course of the fight numerous combinations hurt Campas and cut his face, in the eleventh round following one of Santos' punches Campas informed Cortez that his vision was not functioning properly. At the moment of the fight's conclusion the scores of the judges were 99–91, 97–93 and 99–90 in favor of Santos. On August 17, 2002, Santos defended this championship for a first time against Mehrdud Takaloo, in a fight that also involved the World Boxing Union Light middleweight championship. The event took place in the Cardiff Castle located in Cardiff, Wales. Takaloo began the fight by using his right hand often and on the fourth round he scored a knockdown. As the fight progressed Takaloo began to show signs of exhaustion and Santos managed to have a strong performance in the second half of the fight. Takaloo received cuts around both of his eyes which made the referee consider stopping the fight twice in the tenth round. When the fight ended Santos won the contest by unanimous decision and the judges' scores were 116–111, 116–112, 117–110.

On January 14, 2004, Warrior's Boxing Promotions announced that they had signed Santos to exclusively acquire the rights to promote the fights where he performed. At the moment of the announcement Santos said that he expected to have a productive business relationship with the promotion, and highlighted the company's organization, he said: "I am very impressed with the Warriors organization and believe that they will provide me with the platform to show the world that I am truly one of the best champions competing today." The executive director of the promotion, Jessie Robinson said that the company had been scouting Daniel for years, his words were: "We have had our eye on Santos for the past two years and strongly feel that he is a serious player in the junior middleweight division. We will be announcing our long term plans for Mr. Santos shortly."

On September 11, 2004, Santos fought in a rematch against Antonio Margarito as part of the undercard of the Cotto-Pinto undercard. Early in the fight Santos' strategy consisted of connecting with short punches with his left arm, including a strong impact to Margarito's face in the first round. In the fifth round Margarito connected several strong punches to his head and body. Throughout the course of the fight both boxers fought at close quarters which led to their heads hitting against each other several times. Margarito's face began bleeding in the sixth round which led to the referee stopping the fight twice in this round. Attempts by Francisco Ezpinoza, Margarito's cutman, to stop the bleeding were unsuccessful. In the late rounds Santos began boxing and focused some of his punches in Margarito's wound. In the tenth round Margarito responded to the bell but following the first seconds of the round the ringside doctor declared that he could not continue further. The result of the fight was decided by the scores of the judges, awarding Santos a victory by technical decision. On June 28, 2003, he defended against Fulgencio Zúñiga in a card that took place in the Ruben Rodriguez Coliseum in Bayamón, Puerto Rico. Daniel won the contest by unanimous decision with identical scores of 118–110.

Santos was under contract with Warrior's Boxing Promotions for one year, his contract ended when he abandoned the promotion. On April 26, 2005, Don King Productions announced that the company had acquired the exclusive rights to promote Santos' fights. At the moment of the announcement Don King stated that: "Daniel is another proud Puerto Rican world champion and I'm excited to have him with me, Junior middleweight is a solid division and there are many fights we can make for this great champion. Viva Puerto Rico!." Santos said that this event held significance in his life because:"I want to fight all the best fighters and by being with the best promoter, I know I will get those fights and make good money. I look forward to a long and happy relationship with Don King." When interviewed about Santos' signing, Félix Trinidad Sr. said that he was impressed by Santos' performance against Antonio Margarito and said that a fight between him and Félix Trinidad seemed plausible at the moment. On December 3, 2005, Santos was scheduled to defend the light middleweight championship against Sergiy Dzindziruk. In the eight round of the competition Dzinziruk scored a knockdown. The three judges gave the fight a score of 115–112 in favor of Dzinziruk thus making him the new WBO champion.

On October 6, 2007, Santos returned to action following a period of fifteen months of inactivity. This event took place in a fight card presented in the Madison Square Garden, against José Antonio Rivera. The contest ended in the eight round when Rivera's corner surrendered by "throwing in the towel". At the moment of the fight's conclusion Rivera was receiving several combinations of punches to the face and displayed several injuries and cuts in his face as well as having his nose swollen. Prior to the decision Santos scored a knockdown which lasted until the count of eight. Following the fight Daniel noted that "it was a hard fight." and that Rivera was a "hardy boxer with strong punches", stating that his physical condition was responsible for his resistance throughout the contest.

==== WBA light-middleweight title ====
On July 11, 2008, Santos competed in his first title fight since returning to action, facing Joachim Alcine for the WBA's light middleweight championship. The first round was used by both fighters to study their adversary's technique. Alcine began the second round aggressively, displaying accuracy in some of his punches. Santos focused on counter-attacking Alcine's offense during the following two rounds. He continued using this pattern, establishing notable control of the fight's tempo in the fifth episode. In the sixth Santos connected a jab and followed it with a left hook, this combination injured Alcine who was unable to respond to the referee's count, losing the contest by knockout. Subsequently, Santos was scheduled to defend the championship against Nobihiro Ishida on January 3, 2009. However, the fight was cancelled after it was suddenly suspended less than a month before the date. Don King proposed a unificatory contest against Sergio Martínez, who held the World Boxing Council's interim championship. Santos refused the offer, citing that he had less than a month to train for it after a long period of inactivity, but expressed interest in organizing it in another date. Consequently, the pugilist was inactive for several months. King made an offer to Ricardo Mayorga, pursuing a fight between both pugilists in May, but the negotiations failed to advance. On August 17, 2009, Top Rank won a bid to organize a fight between Santos and the WBA's first contender, Yuri Foreman. The promotion scheduled the contest to take place as part of the undercard of "Firepower", a card featuring a fight between Miguel Cotto and Manny Pacquiao in the main event. On that date, Santos lost the championship by unanimous decision to Foreman, with scores of 116–110 and 117–109 twice.

== Legal troubles ==
On September 27, 2018, Santos was arrested by police, accused of resisting arrest and threatening two policemen who went to his house to arrest him on charges of threatening his ex-wife, an event which had allegedly taken place on September 24 of that year. While taken into custody, Santos was interviewed by a reporter of the popular television gossip show, Lo Se Todo. He took that opportunity to plead with the Puerto Rican public to help him get help for unspecified problems.

== Professional boxing record ==
38 fights	32 wins	4 losses
By knockout	23	1
By decision	9	3
Draws	1	
No contests	1	

No.	Result	Record	Opponent	Type	Round, time	Date	Location	Notes
38	Loss	32–4–1 (1)	Yuri Foreman	UD	12	Nov 14, 2009	MGM Grand, Las Vegas, Nevada, U.S.	Lost WBA light middleweight title
37	Win	32–3–1 (1)	Joachim Alcine	KO	6 (12), 2:06	Jul 11, 2008	Uniprix Stadium, Montreal, Quebec, Canada	Won WBA light middleweight title
36	Win	31–3–1 (1)	José Antonio Rivera	TKO	8 (12), 2:50	Oct 6, 2007	Madison Square Garden, New York City, New York, U.S.	
35	Win	30–3–1 (1)	Will Evans	KO	1 (10), 0:52	Jul 8, 2006	Savvis Center, Saint Louis, Missouri, U.S.	
34	Loss	29–3–1 (1)	Sergiy Dzinziruk	UD	12	Dec 3, 2005	Bordelandhalle, Magdeburg, Sachsen-Anhalt, Germany	Lost WBO light middleweight title
33	Win	29–2–1 (1)	Antonio Margarito	TD	10 (12)	Sep 11, 2004	Coliseo Jose Miguel Agrelot, Hato Rey, Puerto Rico	Retained WBO light middleweight title
32	Win	28–2–1 (1)	Michael Lerma	UD	12	Apr 17, 2004	Florida State Fairgrounds Hall, Tampa, Florida, U.S.	Retained WBO light middleweight title
31	Win	27–2–1 (1)	Fulgencio Zeniga	UD	12	Jun 28, 2003	Coliseo Ruben Rodriguez, Bayamon, Puerto Rico	Retained WBO light middleweight title
30	Win	26–2–1 (1)	Takaloo	UD	12	Aug 17, 2002	Cardiff Castle, Cardiff, Wales	Retained WBO light middleweight title; Won WBU light middleweight title
29	Win	25–2–1 (1)	Yori Boy Campas	TKO	11 (12), 1:36	Mar 16, 2002	Bally's Las Vegas, Las Vegas, Nevada, U.S.	Won vacant WBO light middleweight title
28	NC	24–2–1 (1)	Antonio Margarito	NC	1 (12), 2:11	Jul 21, 2001	Coliseo Ruben Rodriguez, Bayamon, Puerto Rico	WBO welterweight title at stake; Margarito cut from an accidental head clash
27	Win	24–2–1	Neil Sinclair	KO	2 (12), 2:25	Dec 16, 2000	Sheffield Arena, Sheffield, Yorkshire, England	Retained WBO welterweight title
26	Win	23–2–1	Giovanni Parisi	KO	4 (12), 2:32	Jul 29, 2000	Stadio Granillo, Reggio Calabria, Calabria, Italy	Retained WBO welterweight title
25	Win	22–2–1	Akhmed Kotiev	KO	5 (12), 2:07	May 6, 2000	Swissotel, Neuss, Nordrhein-Westfalen, Germany	Won WBO welterweight title
24	Loss	21–2–1	Akhmed Kotiev	SD	12	Nov 27, 1999	Hansehalle, Lübeck, Schleswig-Holstein, Germany	For WBO welterweight title
23	Win	21–1–1	Juan Soberanas	KO	2 (6), 2:59	Oct 15, 1999	Cobo Hall, Detroit, Michigan, U.S.	
22	Loss	20–1–1	Kofi Jantuah	TKO	5 (10), 2:57	May 7, 1999	All American Sports Park, Las Vegas, Nevada, U.S.	
21	Win	20–0–1	Ray Lovato	TKO	2 (12), 1:39	Mar 6, 1999	Fantasy Springs Casino, Indio, California, U.S.	Won IBA Continental welterweight title
20	Win	19–0–1	Ameth Arenda	TKO	2 (8), 2:05	Nov 14, 1998	County Coliseum, El Paso, Texas, U.S.	
19	Win	18–0–1	Humberto Rodríguez	UD	6	Sep 12, 1998	Fantasy Springs Casino, Indio, California, U.S.	
18	Win	17–0–1	William Ruiz	TKO	3 (8), 2:05	Jul 10, 1998	Miccosukee Indian Gaming Resort, Miami, Florida, U.S.	
17	Win	16–0–1	Juan Carlos Rodriguez	TKO	5 (10), 2:00	Jun 13, 1998	Sun Bowl, El Paso, Texas, U.S.	
16	Win	15–0–1	Fidel Avendano	UD	10	May 16, 1998	Fantasy Springs Casino, Indio, California, U.S.	
15	Win	14–0–1	Abraham Martinez	KO	1 (?)	Apr 3, 1998	Auditorio Municipal, Tijuana, Baja California, Mexico	
14	Draw	13–0–1	Jose Luis Verdugo	TD	1 (12)	Mar 15, 1998	Sycuan Casino, El Cajon, California, U.S.	Verdugo cut from an accidental head clash
13	Win	13–0	Jerry Booker	TKO	3 (8), 2:18	Dec 6, 1997	Caesars Hotel & Casino, Atlantic City, New Jersey, U.S.	
12	Win	12–0	Miguel Gonzalez	TKO	7 (8), 0:36	Oct 18, 1997	Buffalo Bill's Star Arena, Primm, Nevada, U.S.	
11	Win	11–0	Margarito Navarro	TKO	3 (8), 1:36	Sep 12, 1997	Caesars Palace, Las Vegas, Nevada, U.S.	
10	Win	10–0	Agustin Silva	PTS	8	Jul 13, 1997	Grand Casino, Biloxi, Mississippi, U.S.	
9	Win	9–0	Bernard Gray	UD	6	Jun 14, 1997	Grand Casino, Biloxi, Mississippi, U.S.	
8	Win	8–0	Edgardo Vasquez	UD	6	May 14, 1997	Foxwoods Resort, Mashantucket, Connecticut, U.S.	
7	Win	7–0	Eric Ramon Vazquez	TKO	5 (6), 2:47	Mar 22, 1997	Memorial Coliseum, Corpus Christi, Texas, U.S.	
6	Win	6–0	Mario Jesus Nazareno	KO	2 (?), 2:30	Feb 12, 1997	Madison Square Garden Theater, New York City, New York, U.S.	
5	Win	5–0	Reynaldo Ramirez	KO	3 (4), 2:05	Jan 18, 1997	Thomas & Mack Center, Las Vegas, Nevada, U.S.	
4	Win	4–0	Juan Manuel Herrera	KO	1 (4), 1:01	Dec 10, 1996	Memorial Coliseum, Corpus Christi, Texas, U.S.	
3	Win	3–0	Frank Houghtaling	TKO	2 (4)	Nov 16, 1996	Ballys Park Place Hotel Casino, Atlantic City, New Jersey, U.S.	
2	Win	2–0	Roman Acosta	KO	1 (4)	Oct 12, 1996	Arrowhead Pond, Anaheim, California, U.S.	
1	Win	1–0	Andre Hawthorne	TKO	1 (4), 1:54	Sep 28, 1996	Will Rogers Coliseum, Fort Worth, Texas, U.S.	

== Titles in boxing ==
=== Major world titles ===
- WBO welterweight champion (147 lbs)
- WBA light middleweight champion (154 lbs)
- WBO light middleweight champion (154 lbs)

=== Regional/International titles ===
- IBA Continental welterweight champion (147 lbs)

== See also ==
- List of Puerto Rican boxing world champions
- List of Puerto Ricans

Sporting positions
Major world boxing titles
Preceded by Akhmed Kotiev	WBO welterweight champion May 6, 2000 – December 5, 2001; Vacated	Vacant Title next held by Antonio Margarito
Vacant Title last held by Harry Simon	WBO light middleweight champion March 16, 2002– December 3, 2005	Succeeded by Sergiy Dzinziruk
Preceded by Joachim Alcine	WBA light middleweight champion July 11, 2008 – November 14, 2009	Succeeded by Yuri Foreman
