= Hearns =

Hearns is a surname. Notable people with the surname include:

- Elle Hearns, African American organizer, speaker, writer, and transgender rights activist
- Ronald Hearns (born 1984), American professional boxer and the son of Thomas "Hitman" Hearns
- Sugar Ray Leonard vs. Thomas Hearns in 1981 and 1989, eagerly anticipated confrontations in the history of boxing
- Thomas Hearns (born 1958), American 8-time world champion professional boxer

== See also ==
- Hearn (disambiguation)
