= Joachim Alcine =

Haitian-Canadian professional boxer

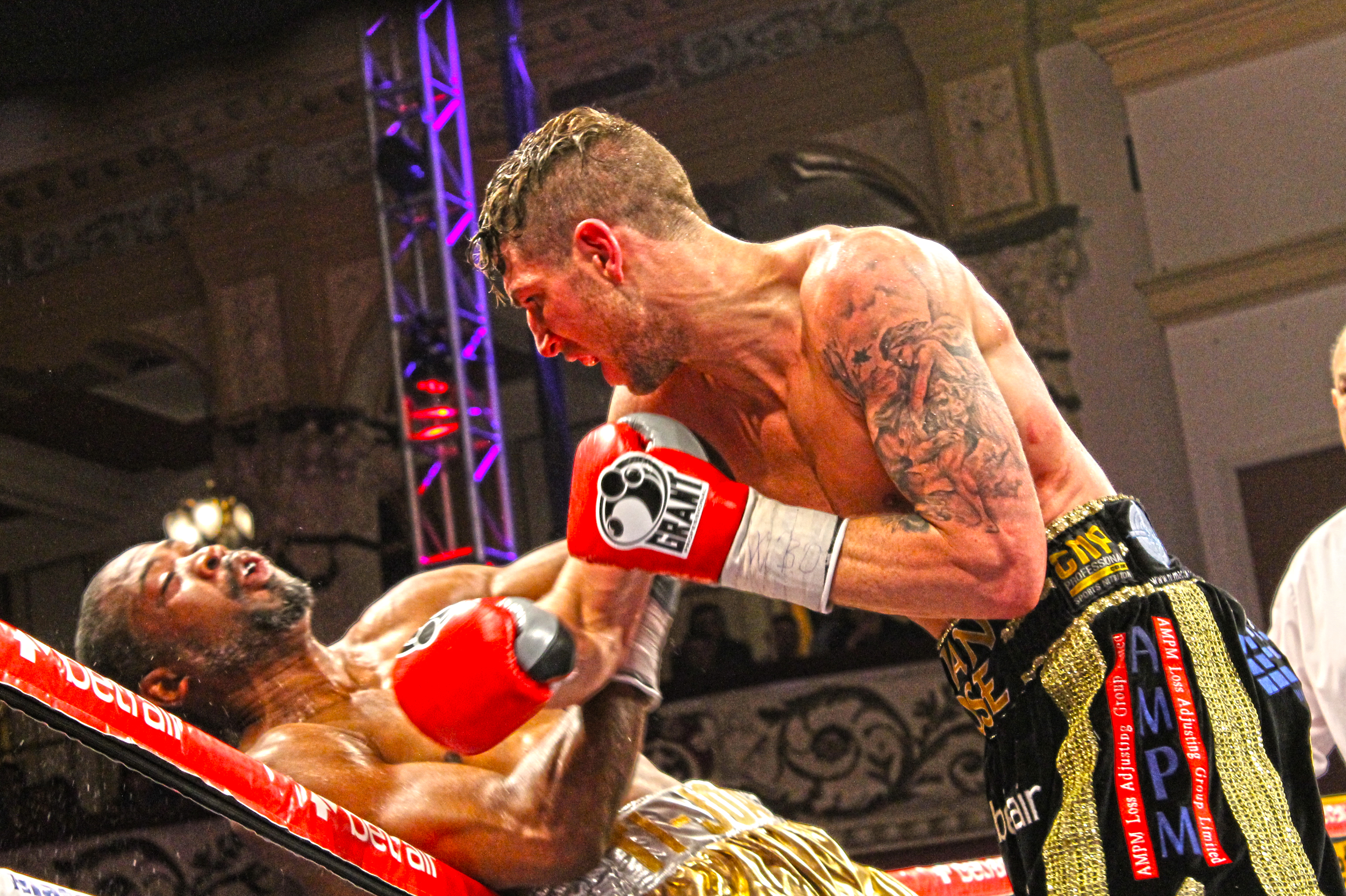
- Alcine on the Ropes

Personal information
- Nickname: Ti-Joa
- Nationality: Canadian; Haitian
- Born: March 26, 1976 (age 50) Gonaïves, Haiti
- Height: 5 ft 11 in (180 cm)
- Weight: Light middleweight; Middleweight

Boxing career
- Reach: 73 in (185 cm)
- Stance: Orthodox

Boxing record
- Total fights: 45
- Wins: 35
- Win by KO: 21
- Losses: 8
- Draws: 2

Joachim Alcine (born March 26, 1976) is a Haitian-Canadian professional boxer fighting out of Montreal, Quebec. He is a former WBA light middleweight champion.

== Professional career ==
Alcine defeated Jose Hilton Dos Santos on April 24, 2004, to win the WBA Fedelatin Light Middleweight Title, Fernando Hernandez on October 9, 2006, to win the NABA Light Middleweight Title and Elio Ortiz on May 28, 2005, to win the WBC International Light Middleweight Title. He has a professional record of 31-2 (with 19 wins by KO). On 2007-07-07, he became the WBA Light Middleweight champion after defeating Travis Simms by unanimous decision. He is now the WBO Inter-Continental Light Middleweight champion. He is currently a training and sparring partner of mixed martial artist and current Ultimate Fighting Championship Welterweight champion Georges St-Pierre.

On December 7, 2007, he successfully defended his title by TKO in the 12th round against Panamanian Alfonso Mosquera at the Bell Centre in Montreal, Quebec, Canada. He lost the title to Daniel Santos on July 11, 2008, by KO.

=== Comeback ===
Alcine returned on August 28, 2009, year to beat Eric Mitchell by UD in which Mitchell came in over the contracted weight of 158 lbs, but Alcine agreed to go forward with the fight without penalty to Mitchell. Mitchell was also penalized one point for holding in round 9.

Then on December 5 Alcine beat Light Middleweight prospect Christophe Canclaux also by UD to win the WBO Inter-Continental Light Middleweight Title (vacated by Alfredo Angulo), Canclaux was penalized one point in round 2 for hitting behind the head.

=== Angulo vs. Alcine ===
Alcine lost to top Light Middleweight contender and Interim WBO Champion, Alfredo Angulo. The fight was for the vacant WBC Continental Americas Light Middleweight Title and was a WBC Final Elimination bout.

=== Alcine vs. Lemieux ===
In a huge upset, Alcine defeated Lemieux at the Bell Center, Montreal, on December 10, 2011. The fight was declared a majority decision over 12 rounds, awarding Alcine the WBC International Middleweight title. Most ringside observers thought Alcine totally dominated the fight.

=== Alcine vs. Macklin ===
On September 15, 2012 Alcine faced Irish brawler and two-time World Title challenger Matthew Macklin (at the time 28–4, 19 KO's) on the HBO PPV Undercard of Julio César Chávez Jr. vs. Sergio Martinez for the WBC Middleweight Title in the Thomas & Mack Center, Las Vegas. Macklin was coming off an extremely controversial split decision loss to WBA Super World Middleweight Champion Felix Sturm, and an 11th-round TKO loss to Lineal Middleweight champion Sergio Martinez on St. Patrick's day. Alcine was knocked down twice and the referee stopped the fight with about 30 seconds left in the round giving Macklin a 1st-round TKO victory. This was the fastest Alcine has ever been knocked out.

== Professional boxing record ==
45 fights	35 wins	8 losses
By knockout	21	5
By decision	13	3
By disqualification	1	0
Draws	2	

No.	Result	Record	Opponent	Type	Round, time	Date	Location	Notes
45	Loss	35–8–2	Jermell Charlo	TKO	6 (10), 1:21	31 Oct 2015	NRG Arena, Houston, Texas, U.S.	
44	Draw	35–7–2	Delvin Rodríguez	SD	10	16 May 2014	Olympic Stadium, Montreal, Quebec, Canada	
43	Win	35–7–1	Jovan Ramirez	TKO	3 (8), 1:23	22 Feb 2014	Celebrity Theatre, Phoenix, Arizona, U.S.	
42	Win	34–7–1	Lawrence Hughes	TKO	3 (6), 3:00	24 Jan 2014	Chevrolet Event Center, Oklahoma City, Oklahoma, U.S.	
41	Loss	33–7–1	Francisco Santana	UD	10	6 Dec 2013	Chumash Casino Resort, Santa Ynez, California, U.S.	
40	Loss	33–6–1	Omar Chávez	UD	10	19 Oct 2013	Auditorio Municipal, Cabo San Lucas, Baja California Sur, Mexico	
39	Loss	33–5–1	Julian Williams	UD	8	22 Jun 2013	Barclays Center, Brooklyn, New York, U.S.	
38	Loss	33–4–1	Brian Rose	TKO	12 (12), 0:59	20 Apr 2013	Winter Gardens, Blackpool, England, U.K.	For vacant WBO Inter-Continental light middleweight title.
37	Loss	33–3–1	Matthew Macklin	KO	1 (10), 2:36	15 Sep 2012	Thomas & Mack Center, Las Vegas, Nevada, U.S.	
36	Win	33–2–1	David Lemieux	MD	12	10 Dec 2011	Bell Centre, Montreal, Quebec, Canada	Won WBC International middleweight title
35	Draw	32–2–1	Jose Medina	SD	8	20 Aug 2011	Mechanics Hall, Worcester, Massachusetts, U.S.	
34	Loss	32–2	Alfredo Angulo	TKO	1 (12), 2:59	17 Jul 2010	Agua Caliente Casino Resort Spa, Rancho Mirage, California, U.S.	For vacant WBC Continental Americas light middleweight title.
33	Win	32–1	Christophe Canclaux	UD	12	5 Dec 2009	Montreal Casino, Montreal, Quebec, Canada	Win vacant WBO Inter-Continental light middleweight title.
32	Win	31–1	Eric Mitchell	UD	10	28 Aug 2009	Montreal Casino, Montreal, Quebec, Canada	
31	Loss	30–1	Daniel Santos	KO	6 (12), 2:06	11 Jul 2008	Uniprix Stadium, Montreal, Quebec, Canada	Lost WBA light middleweight title
30	Win	30–0	Alfonso Mosquera	TKO	12 (12), 2:17	7 Dec 2007	Bell Centre, Montreal, Quebec, Canada	Retained WBA light middleweight title
29	Win	29–0	Travis Simms	UD	12	7 Jul 2007	Harbour Yard Arena, Bridgeport, Connecticut, U.S.	Won WBA light middleweight title
28	Win	28–0	Jose Joaquin Rosa Gomez	DQ	10 (10), 1:13	28 Oct 2006	Casino du Lac-Leamy, Hull, Quebec, Canada	
27	Win	27–0	Javier Alberto Mamani	UD	12	23 Jun 2006	Uniprix Stadium, Montreal, Quebec, Canada	
26	Win	26–0	Anderson Clayton	UD	12	11 Feb 2006	Montreal Casino, Montreal, Quebec, Canada	Retained NABA light middleweight title
25	Win	25–0	Marco Antonio Avendano	TKO	8 (12), 2:51	10 Sep 2005	Montreal Casino, Montreal, Quebec, Canada	Retained WBC International and NABA light middleweight titles Won WBA Fedecentro light middleweight title.
24	Win	24–0	Elio Ortiz	KO	10 (12), 1:39	28 May 2005	Casino du Lac-Leamy, Hull, Quebec, Canada	Retained WBC International and NABA light middleweight titles
23	Win	23–0	Carl Daniels	TKO	6 (10), 3:00	9 Apr 2005	Montreal Casino, Montreal, Quebec, Canada	
22	Win	22–0	Carlos Bojorquez	TKO	7 (12), 3:00	12 Feb 2005	Montreal Casino, Montreal, Quebec, Canada	Retained NABA light middleweight title Won WBC International light middleweight title
21	Win	21–0	Stéphane Ouellet	KO	1 (10), 1:09	17 Dec 2004	Bell Centre, Montreal, Quebec, Canada	
20	Win	20–0	Fernando Hernandez	KO	5 (10), 2:43	9 Oct 2004	Montreal Casino, Montreal, Quebec, Canada	Retained WBA Fedelatin light middleweight title; Won NABA light middleweight title
19	Win	19–0	Jose Hilton Dos Santos	TKO	4 (12), 1:28	24 Apr 2004	Pepsi Coliseum, Quebec City, Quebec, Canada	Won vacant WBA Fedelatin light middleweight title
18	Win	18–0	Darrell Woods	UD	10	20 Dec 2003	Bell Centre, Montreal, Quebec, Canada	
17	Win	17–0	Bejamin Modeste	KO	1 (8), 2:26	22 Nov 2003	Bell Centre, Montreal, Quebec, Canada	
16	Win	16–0	Leonard Townsend	UD	6	17 May 2003	Petersen Events Center, Pittsburgh, Pennsylvania, U.S.	
15	Win	15–0	Wayne Harris	TKO	3 (10), 2:02	28 Feb 2003	Leonard-Grondin Arena, Granby, Quebec, Canada	
14	Win	14–0	Brooke Wellby	TKO	3 (12), 2:12	6 Sep 2002	Bell Centre, Montreal, Quebec, Canada	Won vacant Canada light middleweight title
13	Win	13–0	Marcos Primera	UD	12	25 May 2002	Lowes Speedway, Charlotte, North Carolina, U.S.	Won vacant IBA Continental Americas light middleweight title
12	Win	12–0	Christopher Henry	UD	8	1 Feb 2002	Hershey Centre, Mississauga, Ontario, Canada	
11	Win	11–0	Jose Aponte	TKO	2 (8), 2:40	30 Nov 2001	Molson Centre, Montreal, Quebec, Canada	
10	Win	10–0	Wayne Harris	UD	6	10 Jul 2001	Molson Centre, Montreal, Quebec, Canada	
9	Win	9–0	Alex Lubo	TKO	3 (8), 3:00	2 Mar 2001	Molson Centre, Montreal, Quebec, Canada	
8	Win	8–0	Rob Stowell	TKO	3 (6)	15 Dec 2000	Molson Centre, Montreal, Quebec, Canada	
7	Win	7–0	Richard Hall	UD	6	16 Jun 2000	Molson Centre, Montreal, Quebec, Canada	
6	Win	6–0	John Martinez	TKO	2 (6), 1:57	9 May 2000	Molson Centre, Montreal, Quebec, Canada	
5	Win	5–0	Denny Dalton	TKO	3 (4), 1:19	7 Mar 2000	Molson Centre, Montreal, Quebec, Canada	
4	Win	4–0	Leon Gilkes	TKO	3 (4), 1:58	15 Feb 2000	Molson Centre, Montreal, Quebec, Canada	
3	Win	3–0	Jason Naugler	MD	4	19 Nov 1999	Shaw Conference Centre, Edmonton, Alberta, Canada	
2	Win	2–0	Sylvain Hovington	TKO	2 (4)	29 Oct 1999	Molson Centre, Montreal, Quebec, Canada	
1	Win	1–0	Louis Bouchard	TKO	1 (4), 2:44	28 May 1999	Molson Centre, Montreal, Quebec, Canada	

== See also ==
- List of world light-middleweight boxing champions

Sporting positions
Regional boxing titles
Vacant Title last held by Tony Badea	Canadian super welterweight champion September 6, 2002 – 2002; Vacated	Vacant Title next held by Sébastien Demers
World boxing titles
Preceded by Travis Simms	WBA super-welterweight champion July 7, 2007 – July 11, 2008	Succeeded by Daniel Santos
