= Alfredo Angulo =

Mexican boxer (born 1982)

Personal information
- Nickname: El Perro ("The Dog")
- Born: Alfredo Angulo López; August 11, 1982 (age 44) Mexicali, Baja California, Mexico
- Height: 5 ft 9 1/2 in (177 cm)
- Weight: Light middleweight; Middleweight

Boxing career
- Reach: 69 in (175 cm)
- Stance: Orthodox

Boxing record
- Total fights: 34
- Wins: 26
- Win by KO: 21
- Losses: 8
Medal record
Men's amateur boxing
Representing Mexico
Pan American Games
Bronze medal – third place	2003	Welterweight
Central American and Caribbean Games
Bronze medal – third place	2002	Light middleweight

Alfredo Angulo López (born August 11, 1982) is a Mexican professional boxer who held the WBO interim light middleweight title from 2009 to 2010. As an amateur he represented Mexico at the 2004 Olympics, reaching the first round of the middleweight bracket. Nicknamed "El Perro" ("The Dog"), Angulo was a highly regarded light middleweight prospect in the late 2000s and early 2010s, and is particularly known for his relentless pressure fighting style and formidable punching power.

== Amateur career ==
He qualified for the Olympic Games by ending up in second place at the 1st AIBA American 2004 Olympic Qualifying Tournament in Tijuana, Mexico. At the Olympics Angulo lost to Andy Lee, by a score of 38:23. Angulo also has an amateur win over former WBO Welterweight champion Timothy Bradley. Angulo ended his amateur career with a record of 80–15.

== Professional career ==
Alfredo Angulo is an all-action fighter, who turned professional in Arizona. The Mexican was considered by many boxing analysts to be the next Light Middleweight World Champion. On May 17, 2008, he defeated Richard Gutierrez inside of five rounds to take his professional record to 13 wins, 10 by way of knockout. On October 4, 2008, Angulo defeated Ukraine's Andrey Tsurkan (26–3, 17 KO). Angulo, from the beginning of the round was relentless, averaging over 100 punches per round. He stopped Tsurkan in the 11th round when referee Tony Krebs stepped in. Angulo was scheduled to fight former champion Ricardo Mayorga on February 14, 2009. However, Mayorga pulled out ten days before the fight after demanding a larger purse. Angulo fought former NABO light Welterweight champion Cosme Rivera as a replacement and defeated him by fifth-round technical knockout.

=== WBO interim junior middleweight champion ===
In November 2009, Angulo defeated an undefeated Harry Joe Yorgey to claim the interim WBO light middleweight title.

Although Angulo finished off Yorgey in the third round, he scored a knockdown in the second round while landing 58 of 108 punches (according to CompuBox). A huge right hand did the initial damage as he hurt Yorgey against the ropes. But Angulo did not let him off the hook and continued to pound away for the knockout (KO) win.

=== First title defense ===
Angulo knocked out Joel Julio in the 11th round of their bout on April 24, 2010. Angulo stopped Joel Julio with a right cross midway through the 11th round to retain the WBO interim 154-pound title. Angulo earned his third straight KO victory after his only defeat against Kermit Cintron last May. Angulo was slightly more aggressive than the counterpunching Julio, consistently attacking and peppering the Colombian with combinations, including a nasty series of blows in the eighth round.

=== Angulo vs. Alcine ===
On July 17, 2010, Angulo scored a first round stoppage over former WBA Super Welterweight Champion Joachim "Ti-Joa" Alcine (32–1, 19 KOs) of Montreal. Angulo won the vacant WBC Continental Americas Light Middleweight Title.

=== Return ===
On August 20, 2011, Angulo made quick work of Joseph Gomez for his first fight in 13 months. He stopped the New Mexico-based journeyman in the first round with a straight right-left hook to the midsection followed by a cuffing right cross to the back of the head. Angulo's visa problems, prevented him from fighting in the U.S., made the beef with Shaw a moot point.

==== Angulo vs. Mora ====
On April 7, 2018, Angulo lost to Sergio Mora via split-decision. Two of the judges scored it 78-74 for Mora, while the third had Angulo winning the fight, 75–77.

==== Angulo vs. Bravo ====
On April 20, 2019, Angulo fought Evert Bravo. Angulo won the fight via a second-round knockout.

==== Angulo vs. Quillin ====
On September 21, 2019, Angulo faced Peter Quillin. Quillin was ranked #4 by the IBF and #14 by the WBC at super middleweight. Despite being the underdog in the fight, Angulo boxed well and managed to hurt Quillin on multiple occasions. This performance earned Angulo the split-decision victory, winning on two of the scorecards, 97-93 and 96–94, while the third judge had Quillin winning the fight, 96–94.

==== Angulo vs. Hernandez ====
On August 29, 2020, Angulo lost to journeyman Vladimir Hernandez in a big upset by unanimous decision with the scorecards being 98–92, 98–92, and 98–92.

== Professional boxing record ==
34 fights	26 wins	8 losses
By knockout	21	3
By decision	5	5

No.	Result	Record	Opponent	Type	Round, time	Date	Location	Notes
34	Loss	26–8	Vladimir Hernandez	UD	10	Aug 29, 2020	Microsoft Theater, Los Angeles, California, U.S.	
33	Win	26–7	Peter Quillin	SD	10	Sep 21, 2019	Rabobank Arena, Bakersfield, California, U.S.	
32	Win	25–7	Evert Bravo	KO	2 (10), 1:23	Apr 20, 2019	Dignity Health Sports Park, Carson, California, U.S.	
31	Loss	24–7	Sergio Mora	SD	8	Apr 7, 2018	The Joint, Paradise, Nevada, U.S.	
30	Loss	24–6	Freddy Hernández	UD	10	Aug 27, 2016	Honda Center, Anaheim, California, U.S.	
29	Win	24–5	Hector Munoz	RTD	5 (10), 3:00	Aug 29, 2015	Staples Center, Los Angeles, California, U.S.	
28	Win	23–5	Delray Raines	TKO	5 (10), 2:16	Jun 6, 2015	StubHub Center, Carson, California, U.S.	
27	Loss	22–5	James de la Rosa	UD	10	Sep 13, 2014	MGM Grand Garden Arena, Paradise, Nevada, U.S.	
26	Loss	22–4	Canelo Álvarez	TKO	10 (12), 0:47	Mar 8, 2014	MGM Grand Garden Arena, Paradise, Nevada, U.S.	
25	Loss	22–3	Erislandy Lara	TKO	10 (12), 1:50	Jun 8, 2013	Home Depot Center, Carson, California, U.S.	For vacant WBA interim light middleweight title
24	Win	22–2	Jorge Silva	UD	10	Dec 15, 2012	Memorial Sports Arena, Los Angeles, California, U.S.	
23	Win	21–2	Raul Casarez	KO	1 (12), 0:56	Nov 10, 2012	Staples Center, Los Angeles, California, U.S.	
22	Loss	20–2	James Kirkland	TKO	6 (12), 1:58	Nov 5, 2011	Centro de Cancún, Cancún, Mexico	Lost WBC Continental Americas light middleweight title
21	Win	20–1	Joe Gomez	KO	1 (10), 1:24	Aug 20, 2011	El Nido Sports Center, Mexicali, Mexico	Won vacant WBC Continental Americas light middleweight title
20	Win	19–1	Joachim Alcine	TKO	1 (12), 2:59	Jul 17, 2010	Agua Caliente Casino Resort Spa, Rancho Mirage, California, U.S.	Won vacant WBC Continental Americas light middleweight title
19	Win	18–1	Joel Julio	TKO	11 (12), 1:39	Apr 24, 2010	Citizens Business Bank Arena, Ontario, California, U.S.	Retained WBO interim light middleweight title
18	Win	17–1	Harry Joe Yorgey	KO	3 (12), 1:03	Nov 7, 2009	XL Center, Hartford, Connecticut, U.S.	Won vacant WBO interim light middleweight title
17	Win	16–1	Gabriel Rosado	TKO	2 (10), 2:13	Aug 7, 2009	Star of the Desert Arena, Primm, Nevada, U.S.	
16	Loss	15–1	Kermit Cintrón	UD	12	May 30, 2009	Hard Rock Live, Hollywood, Florida, U.S.	
15	Win	15–0	Cosme Rivera	TKO	5 (10), 2:38	Feb 14, 2009	BankAtlantic Center, Sunrise, Florida, U.S.	
14	Win	14–0	Andrey Tsurkan	TKO	10 (10), 2:27	Oct 4, 2008	Pechanga Resort & Casino, Temecula, California, U.S.	
13	Win	13–0	Richard Gutierrez	TKO	5 (10), 2:48	May 17, 2008	Star of the Desert Arena, Primm, Nevada, U.S.	Won vacant WBO Inter-Continental light middleweight title
12	Win	12–0	Ricardo Cortés	KO	1 (10), 2:58	Feb 1, 2008	Grand Casino, Hinckley, Minnesota, U.S.	
11	Win	11–0	Archak TerMeliksetian	TKO	1 (8), 1:19	Nov 30, 2007	Chumash Casino Resort, Santa Ynez, California, U.S.	
10	Win	10–0	Emmanuel Gonzalez	TKO	2 (8), 1:56	Sep 27, 2007	Chumash Casino Resort, Santa Ynez, California, U.S.	
9	Win	9–0	Taronze Washington	TKO	3 (6), 0:10	Aug 4, 2007	Dodge Arena, Hidalgo, Texas, U.S.	
8	Win	8–0	Israel Garcia	TKO	4 (6), 2:23	Jun 1, 2007	Chumash Casino Resort, Santa Ynez, California, U.S.	
7	Win	7–0	Lance Moody	KO	1 (6), 1:06	Apr 7, 2007	Abou Ben Adhem Shrine Mosque, Springfield, Missouri, U.S.	
6	Win	6–0	Raymundo Valenzuela	KO	2 (10), 2:21	Sep 1, 2006	Auditorio del Estado, Mexicali, Mexico	
5	Win	5–0	Javier Arceo	TKO	1 (8)	Jul 4, 2006	Auditorio del Estado, Mexicali, Mexico	
4	Win	4–0	Manuel Alfonso Mada	PTS	4	Mar 3, 2006	Activities Center, Maywood, California, U.S.	
3	Win	3–0	Daniel Stanislavjevic	SD	6	Aug 25, 2005	Marriott Hotel, Irvine, California, U.S.	
2	Win	2–0	Jonathan Taylor	TKO	3 (6), 2:09	May 5, 2005	Desert Diamond Casino, Tucson, Arizona, U.S.	
1	Win	1–0	Tomas Padron	MD	4	Jan 6, 2005	Desert Diamond Casino, Tucson, Arizona, U.S.	

== Pay-per-view bouts ==
United States
Date	Fight	Billing	Buys	Network	Revenue
8 March 2014	Canelo vs. Angulo	Toe to Toe	350,000	Showtime	$20,000,000

== Bare-knuckle boxing ==
=== Bare Knuckle Fighting Championship ===
Angulo made his debut against Jeremiah Riggs in a middleweight bout at BKFC: Knucklemania IV on April 27, 2024. Despite being on the receiving end of many punches early in the bout, he came back and won the bout by knockout in the first round. This fight earned him the Knockout of the Night award.

Angulo faced Julian Lane on November 9, 2024, at BKFC on DAZN 2. He lost the fight by unanimous decision.

== Championships and accomplishments ==
=== Bare-knuckle boxing ===
- Bare Knuckle Fighting Championship
  - Knockout of the Night (One time) vs. Jeremiah Riggs

== Bare knuckle boxing record ==
Professional record breakdown
2 matches	1 win	1 loss
By knockout	1	0
By decision	0	1

Res.	Record	Opponent	Method	Event	Date	Round	Time	Location	Notes
Loss	1–1	Julian Lane	Decision (unanimous)	BKFC on DAZN Montana: Stewart vs. Rivera	November 9, 2024	5	2:00	Billings, Montana, United States	
Win	1–0	Jeremiah Riggs	KO (punches)	BKFC Knucklemania IV	April 27, 2024	1	1:07	Los Angeles, California, United States	Knockout of the Night.

Sporting positions
Regional boxing titles
Vacant Title last held by Lukáš Konečný	WBO Inter-Continental light middleweight champion May 17, 2008 – November 7, 2009; Won interim world title	Vacant Title next held by Joachim Alcine
Vacant Title last held by Austin Trout	WBC Continental Americas light middleweight champion July 17, 2010 – 2011; Stripped	Vacant Title next held by Himself
Vacant Title last held by Himself	WBC Continental Americas light middleweight champion August 20, 2011 – November 5, 2011	Succeeded by James Kirkland
World boxing titles
Vacant Title last held by Paul Williams	WBO light middleweight champion Interim title November 7, 2009 – July 17, 2010; Stripped	Vacant Title next held by Zaurbek Baysangurov
