= Travis Simms =

American boxer

Personal information
- Nickname: Tremendous
- Born: May 1, 1971 (age 55) Norwalk, Connecticut, U.S.
- Height: 5 ft 9 1/2 in (177 cm)
- Weight: Light middleweight

Boxing career
- Reach: 69 in (175 cm)
- Stance: Southpaw

Boxing record
- Total fights: 29
- Wins: 28
- Win by KO: 19
- Losses: 1

Travis Simms (born May 1, 1971) is a Democratic member of the Connecticut House of Representatives, where he represents the 140th Assembly District. The district consists of the central part of the city of Norwalk. He previously served on Norwalk's Common Council. Prior to his political career he was a professional boxer in the super welterweight (154 lb) division.

== Background ==
Simms is a native of the South Norwalk section of Norwalk, Connecticut. His childhood street bears his name "Travis Simms Way". He is currently a member of the Norwalk Common Council. His identical twin brother, Tarvis Simms, is also a fighter.

== Boxing career ==
Simms, nicknamed "Tremendous", turned pro late at the age of 26, after a stellar amateur career. Although he held the title twice, he was still undefeated until his 26th bout. He first won it in 2003, but was stripped of the belt in May 2005 because he filed a lawsuit against the WBA Organization (in November 2004) for not enforcing his mandatory contract that he received from the organization when he won the regular world title from Alejandro Garcia 2 December 2003.

Simms made a request to enforce his mandate or strip the Super champion Ronald "Winky" Wright.

As the result of an out-of-court settlement in the summer of 2006, the WBA reinstated Simms as "Champion in Recess" in August 2006 while maintaining the full champion status of reigning champion Jose Antonio Rivera. On 6 January 2007, Simms won a nine-round knockout victory against Jose Antonio "El Gallo" Rivera in a championship bout in Hollywood, Florida.

On 7 July 2007, Simms lost his title in a controversial Decision to Joachim Alcine, of Montreal, Quebec (Canada) in the Arena at Harbor Yard in Bridgeport, Connecticut

== Professional boxing record ==
30 fights	28 wins	1 loss
By knockout	19	0
By decision	9	1
Draws	1	

No.	Result	Record	Opponent	Type	Round, time	Date	Location	Notes
29	Win	28–1	Jess Noriega	UD	6 (6)	2014-06-21	Main Event Fitness Center, Columbia, South Carolina, U.S.	
28	Win	27–1	Marcus Luck	TKO	3 (8)	2009-06-20	Radisson Hotel, Columbia, South Carolina, U.S.	
27	Win	26–1	Mike McFail	UD	6 (6)	2008-08-09	Radisson Hotel, Columbia, South Carolina, U.S.	
26	Loss	25–1	Joachim Alcine	UD	12 (12)	2007-07-07	The Arena at Harbor Yard, Bridgeport, Connecticut, U.S.	Lost WBA light middleweight title
25	Win	25–0	José Antonio Rivera	TKO	9 (12)	Jan 6, 2007	Seminole Hard Rock Hotel and Casino, Hollywood, Florida, U.S.	Won WBA light middleweight title
24	Win	24–0	Bronco McKart	UD	12 (12)	2004-10-02	Madison Square Garden, New York City, New York, U.S.	Retained WBA (Regular) light middleweight title
23	Win	23–0	Alejandro García	KO	5 (12)	2003-12-13	Boardwalk Hall, Atlantic City, New Jersey, U.S.	Won WBA (Regular) light middleweight title
22	Win	22–0	Anton Robinson	TKO	7 (12)	2002-11-01	Louisville Gardens, Louisville, Kentucky, U.S.	Won NABA light middleweight title
21	Win	21–0	Alex Carrillo Villa	TKO	1 (8)	2002-08-10	Earthlink Live, Atlanta, Georgia, U.S.	
20	Win	20–0	Gary Grant	UD	6 (6)	2002-01-31	National Guard Armory, Columbia, South Carolina, U.S.	
19	Win	19–0	John Lennox Lewis	TKO	4 (8)	2001-04-01	Club Amazura, Jamaica, Queens, New York, U.S.	
18	Win	18–0	Anthony Brooks	KO	2 (8)	2001-03-17	Benton Convention Center, Winston-Salem, North Carolina, U.S.	
17	Win	17–0	James Mullins	TKO	3 (8)	2001-02-24	Golden Gloves Arena, Knoxville, Tennessee, U.S.	
16	Win	16–0	Kevin Kelly	UD	8 (8)	2000-11-11	Mandalay Bay Resort & Casino, Paradise, Nevada, U.S.	
15	Win	15–0	Samuel Duggins	KO	1 (?)	2000-10-21	Columbia, South Carolina, U.S.	
14	Win	14–0	Darrett Crockett	TKO	6 (8)	2000-09-23	Camden, South Carolina, U.S.	
13	Win	13–0	Benji Singleton	UD	10 (10)	2000-04-14	Hubbnell Gym, Bridgeport, Connecticut, U.S.	
12	Win	12–0	Bernice Barber	TKO	3 (?)	1999-10-28	Atlanta, Georgia, U.S.	
11	Win	11–0	Mack Willis	TD	4 (?)	1999-09-30	Atlanta, Georgia, U.S.	
10	Win	10–0	Alonzo Sojourney	TKO	1 (?)	1999-08-07	Bi-Lo Center, Greenville, South Carolina, U.S.	
9	Win	9–0	Keith Williams	KO	1 (4)	1999-05-21	Coliseum, Greensboro, North Carolina, U.S.	
8	Win	8–0	Thomas Macera	TKO	1 (?)	1999-05-08	Atlanta, Georgia, U.S.	
7	Win	7–0	Devin Arthurs	TKO	1 (4)	1999-02-19	Capitol Theatre, Port Chester, New York, U.S.	
6	Win	6–0	Thomas Johnson	TKO	4 (4)	1998-10-22	Roxy Theater, Atlanta, Georgia, U.S.	
5	Win	5–0	Richard Gonzalez	UD	4 (4)	1998-07-31	The Orleans, Paradise, Nevada, U.S.	
4	Win	4–0	Quinton Virgen	PTS	4 (4)	1998-05-28	Roxy Theater, Atlanta, Georgia, U.S.	
3	Win	3–0	Elijah McNeil	TKO	4 (4)	1998-04-25	Sportsfest, Staten Island, New York, U.S.	
2	Win	2–0	Stuart Daniels	KO	1 (4)	1998-03-12	The Vanderbilt, Plainview, New York, U.S.	
1	Win	1–0	Michael Brown	TKO	3 (?)	1998-02-10	Casino Rouge, Baton Rouge, Louisiana, U.S.	

== Later in life ==
Police arrested Simms on 19 August 2012 after he refused to leave a large disturbance involving the widow of his adopted brother. He was found not guilty on all charges on 4 December 2014.

Also, on Monday 20 October 2014 Simms was arrested after reporting a gun stolen out of his Range Rover. He informed police that the handgun was loaded with 12 rounds of ammunition which is a violation of Connecticut law which limits magazine capacity to 10 rounds.

== Political career ==
For a decade, Simms served on the Norwalk City Council representing District B consisting of South Norwalk. In November 2018, Simms won the state legislature's 140th seat representing Norwalk.

== See also ==
- List of southpaw stance boxers
- List of boxing families
- List of world light-middleweight boxing champions

Sporting positions
Regional boxing titles
Vacant Title last held by Jose Flores	NABA Light Middleweight champion November 1, 2002 – 2003; Vacated	Vacant Title next held by Ángel Hernández
World boxing titles
Preceded by Alejandro García	WBA light middleweight champion Regular title December 13, 2003 – March 20, 2005; Promoted	Vacant Title next held by Austin Trout
Vacant Title last held by Winky Wright	WBA Light Middleweight champion March 20, 2005 – June 2005; Stripped	Succeeded by Alejandro García promoted from interim status
Preceded by José Antonio Rivera	WBA Light Middleweight champion January 6, 2007 – July 7, 2007	Succeeded by Joachim Alcine
Honorary boxing titles
New title	WBA Light Middleweight; Champion in Recess; August 2006 – January 6, 2007; Regained title	Vacant Title next held by Jermell Charlo
