= Ricardo Cortés =

Mexican boxer (born 1980)

Personal information
- Nickname: El Güero
- Born: 24 January 1980 (age 46) Michoacán de Ocampo, Mexico
- Height: 1.89 m (6 ft 2 in)
- Weight: Super middleweight Middleweight; Light middleweight

Boxing career
- Reach: 189 cm (74 in)
- Stance: Orthodox

Boxing record
- Total fights: 27
- Wins: 23
- Win by KO: 16
- Losses: 3
- Draws: 1
- No contests: 0

Ricardo Cortés (born 24 January 1980) is a Mexican former professional boxer who competed from 2000 to 2009. He held the IBA Americas super middleweight title.

== Professional career ==
On 1 February 2008, Cortes lost by first-round knockout to top Light Middleweight prospect Alfredo Angulo.
