= 1992 Junior World Boxing Championships =

The 1992 Junior World Boxing Championships were held in Montreal, Canada, from September 25 to October 4, 1992. It was the seventh edition of the Junior World Boxing Championships. The competition is under the supervision of the former world-recognized governing body of amateur boxing AIBA and is the junior version of the World Amateur Boxing Championships.

== Medal winners ==
Event	Gold	Silver	Bronze
Light Flyweight (– 48 kg)	Waldemar Font; Cuba	Eric Morel; Puerto Rico	Carmine Molaro; Italy Rene Schultz; Germany
Flyweight (– 51 kg)	Lorenzo Aragon; Cuba	Christian Boiteanu; Romania	Frank Brennfuehrer; Germany Jung Pil Park; South Korea
Bantamweight (– 54 kg)	Neslan Machado; Cuba	Armando Perez; Puerto Rico	Enrique Cora; Venezuela Tamas Olah; Hungary
Featherweight (– 57 kg)	Michael Stewart; Canada	(Turkey) Enver Yilmaz; Turkiyë	Vitaily Chizhik; Ukraine Steven Kuechler; Germany
Lightweight (– 60 kg)	Damian Austin; Cuba	Wade Fleming; Canada	Kim Ik Soo; South Korea (Turkey) Mehmet Erarslan; Turkiyë
Light Welterweight (– 63.5kg)	Oleg Saitov; Russia	Roko Froehlich; Germany	(Republic of Ireland) Neil Sinclair; Ireland Daniel Santos; Puerto Rico
Welterweight (– 67 kg)	Lutz Brors; Germany	Husein Kurbanov; Russia	Eliecer Galiano; Cuba Chan Woo Yang; South Korea
Light Middleweight (– 71 kg)	Julio Acosta; Cuba	Sergey Ismailov; Russia	Oliver Knabe; Germany Stjepan Bozic; Croatia
Middleweight (– 75 kg)	Islam Arsangaliev; Russia	Thomas Ulrich; Germany	Roman Korzh; Ukraine Willard Lewis; Canada
Light Heavyweight (– 81 kg)	(Turkey) Sinan Samil San; Turkiyë	Alexander Gonzalez; Puerto Rico	Yuriy Dvornikov; Ukraine Nelson Beleno; Venezuela
Heavyweight (– 91kg)	(Georgia (country)) Georgi Kandelaki; Georgia	Stephen Galliger; Canada	Peer Mueller; Germany Alex Alejandro; Puerto Rico
Super Heavyweight (+ 91kg)	Mikhail Porshnev; Russia	Luis Lazaro Ulacia; Cuba	Adalat Mamedov; Azerbaijan Timo Hoffmann; Germany

== See also ==
Youth World Boxing Championships
