= BU Castle =

Building owned by Boston University

Coordinates: 42.3509°N 71.1037°W

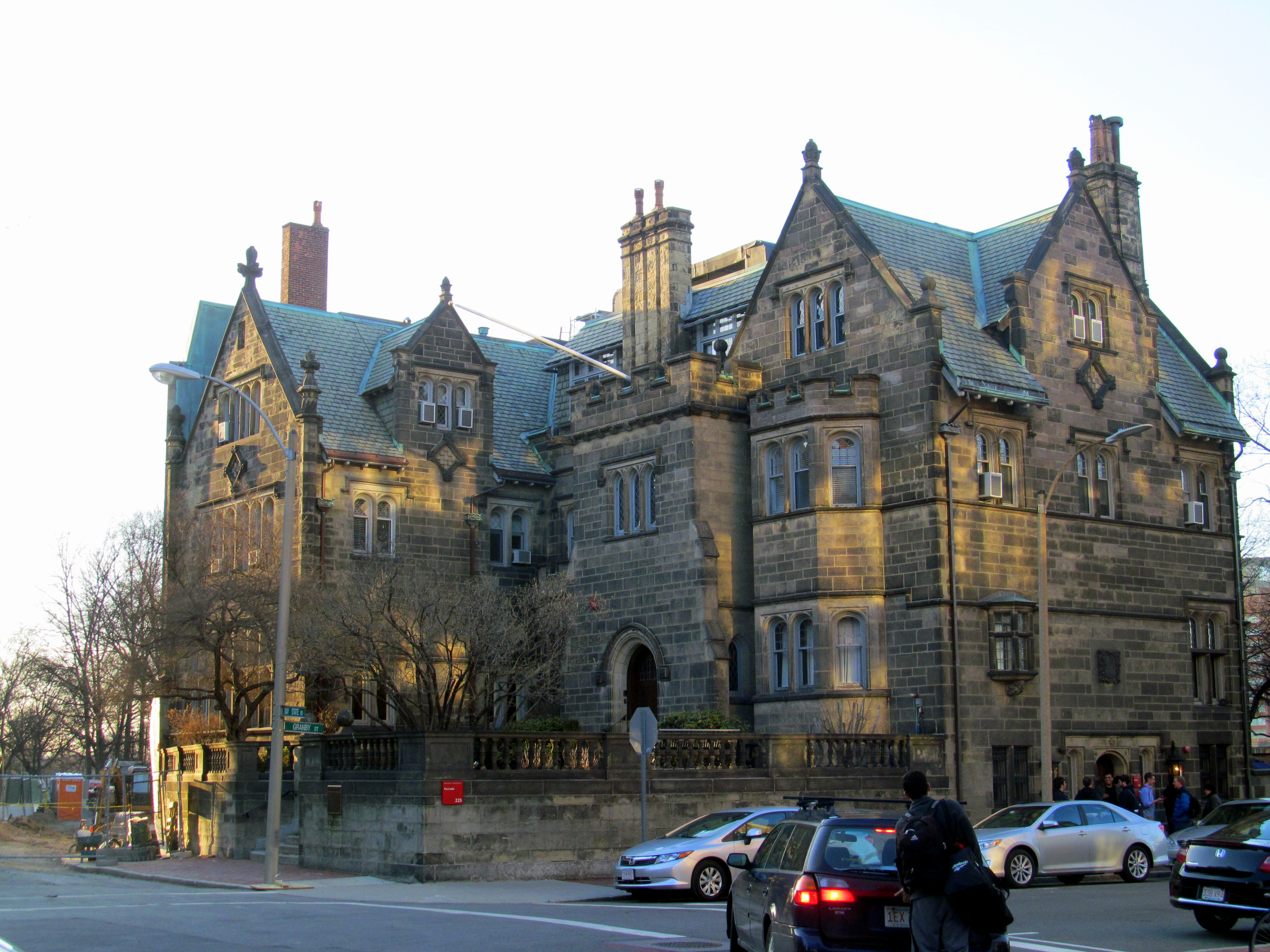
The BU Castle on Bay State Road

The Boston University Castle (or BU Castle or simply "The Castle") is a Tudor Revival-style mansion owned by Boston University on Bay State Road. The school typically uses it for receptions or concerts, but also rents out The Castle to cater events and special occasions.

== Architecture ==
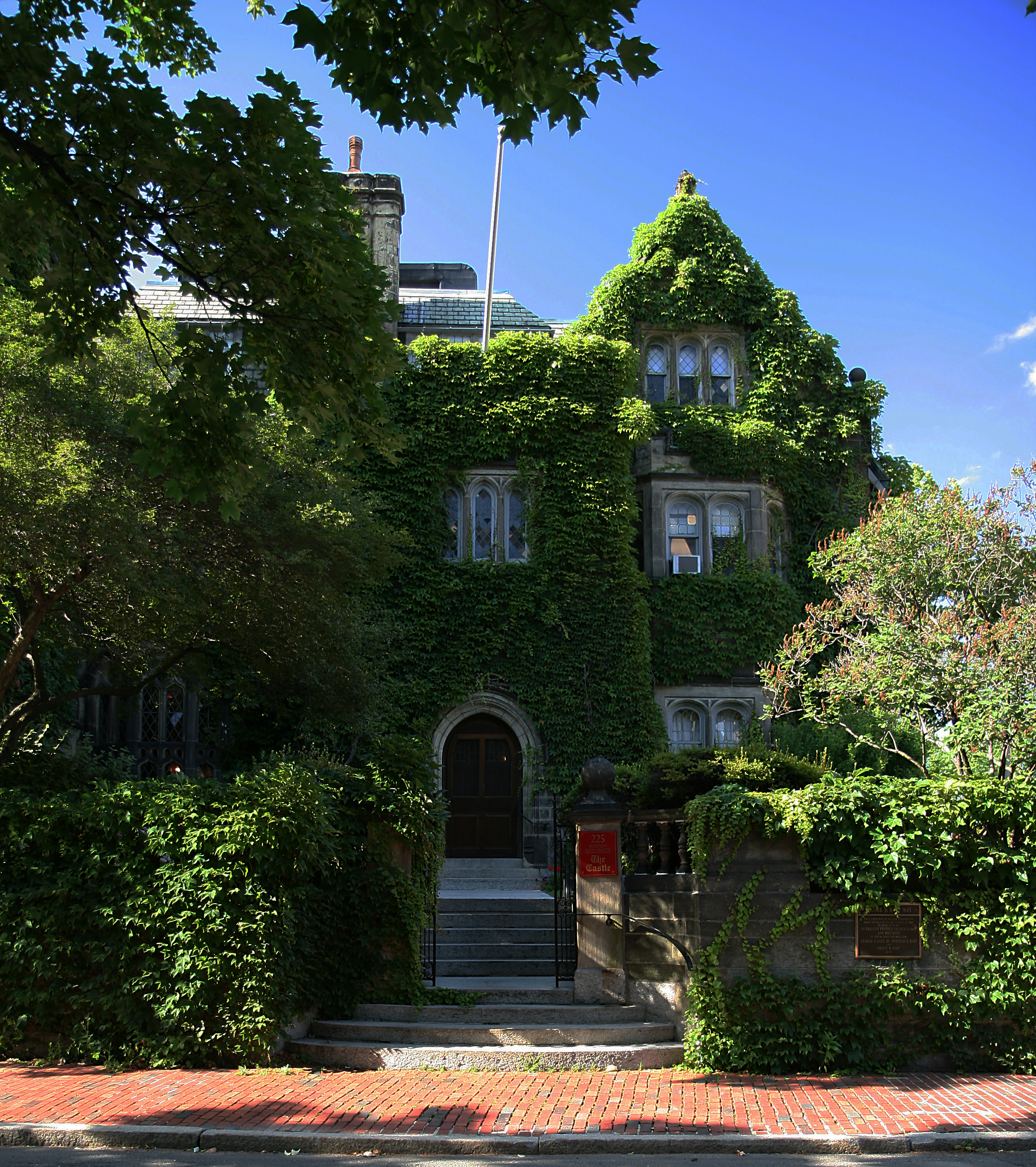
The Castle covered in ivy

The building was cited by architectural historian Bainbridge Bunting in his Houses of Boston's Back Bay as displaying “the most convincing medieval effect of the area.”

According to Boston University, the building's founder, William Lindsey, would have been pleased by this description. Lindsey had derived his inspiration for the Castle from the great manor houses of Tudor England. "The imposing style of these medieval mansions held a special allure for Lindsey, who, besides being a successful businessman, was also a poet and playwright. His writings, such as The Severed Mantle: A romance of medieval Provence and The Red Wine of Roussillon, a blank-verse drama set in France during the Middle Ages, reveal the same fascination with the antique and the romantic that pervades the design of the Castle."

== History ==
The Castle was originally built as a residence for William Lindsey (1858–1922), a prominent Boston businessman who made his fortune with a patented cartridge belt the British Army used during the Boer War. Plans were drawn up in 1904 and construction was completed in 1915 at a cost of more than $500,000.

Shortly after the building's completion, Lindsey's eldest daughter was married in the mansion, though she and her groom would later be killed while on their honeymoon, aboard the ill-fated Lusitania after the ship was torpedoed by a German submarine just off the coast of County Cork. The grief-stricken Lindsey later constructed the magnificent Leslie Lindsey Memorial Chapel in Emmanuel Church on Newbury Street in his daughter's memory.

In 1926, Oakes Ames purchased the Castle from Lindsey's widow. He, University Trustee Dr. William E. Chenery and Chenery's wife donated the mansion to Boston University in 1939. From then until 1967, the Castle was used as the home of Boston University's presidents.

In 2007, the Castle was a filming location for the Kevin Spacey movie 21, and in 2016, for Ghostbusters.

== BU Pub ==
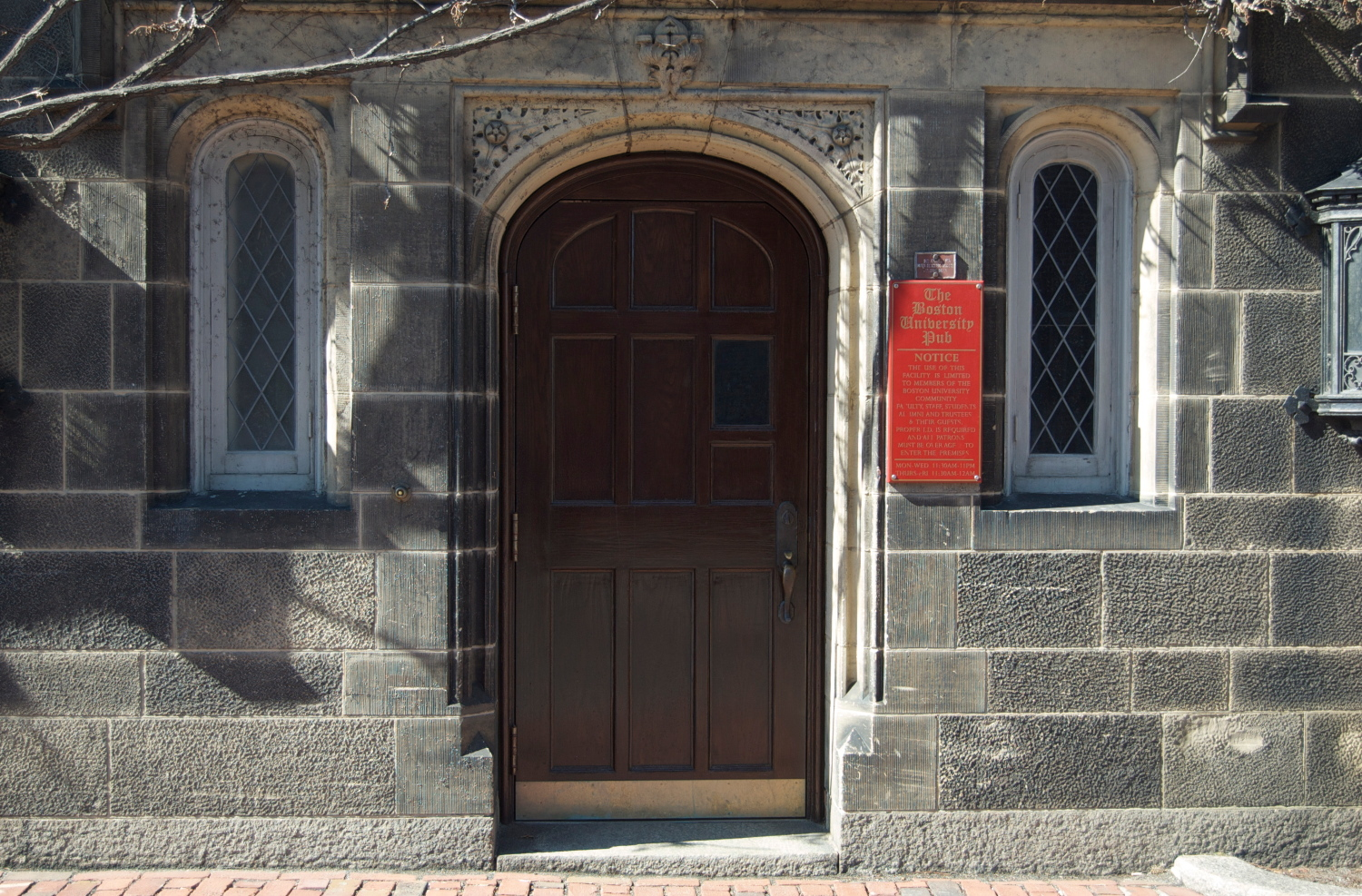
The BU Pub on the side of the Castle

In the basement of the BU Castle is the BU Pub, an English-style pub serving drinks and sandwiches. The Castle is the only Boston University-operated drinking establishment on campus. It is open only to faculty, staff, alumni, students, and invited guests, and is closed on weekends. The Pub sometimes has live music on Thursdays, with performances mostly from BU students. Popular house activities are the Knight's and Lord's Quests. In the Knight's Quest, students must drink 50 different types of beer that the pub offers. The accomplishment culminates in a Knighting Ceremony where the new Knights are given different nicknames by friends for a mug that they can use while at the pub. The Lord's Quest is similar except it involves 60 mixed drinks, and after the ceremony the new Lord's name is engraved on a plaque. For reasons that are not entirely clear, the plaque has not been updated for over two years. In September 2008, the BU Pub canceled the Lord's Quest, so now only the Knight's Quest remains.
