= José Antonio Rivera =

Puerto Rican boxer and politician

Jose Antonio Rivera
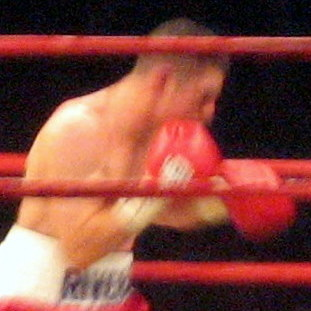
- José Antonio Rivera in October 2007

Personal information
- Nickname: El Gallo
- Born: April 7, 1973 (age 53) Philadelphia, Pennsylvania, U.S.
- Height: 5 ft 8 in (173 cm)
- Weight: Welterweight; Super Welterweight

Boxing career
- Stance: Orthodox

Boxing record
- Total fights: 50
- Wins: 43
- Win by KO: 25
- Losses: 6
- Draws: 1
- No contests: 0

José Antonio Rivera (born April 7, 1973) is an American professional boxer and politician of Puerto Rican descent. He is a former WBA welterweight and super welterweight champion. And as of 2025 is currently serving on the Worcester City Council

== Professional career ==
October 1992 marked the date Jose became a professional boxer. From here he fought his way to becoming Massachusetts State Champion twice, the USBA Regional Champion, the IBO World Champion, and the NABA Champion.

On September 13, 2003, in Germany, Jose fought unbeaten European Champion Michel Trabant and walked away with the WBA Welterweight Championship of the World.

On April 2, 2005, in his defense of the WBA title, Jose lost a very close split decision to his challenger Luis Collazo.

On May 6, 2006, Jose would move up a weight class to Junior Middleweight and fight Champion Alejandro Garcia. He managed to knock him down five times and won to become the new WBA Champion.

On January 6, 2007, Jose defended his new WBA title against Travis Simms but lost in a ninth-round TKO (Technical Knock Out).

In October he was KOd by Daniel Santos. He had announced his intention to retire before that fight, and did so.

Jose made a brief one-fight comeback in August 2008, beating Clarence Taylor in an 8-round decision, then retired again after suffering a hand injury. He plans to make a second comeback in his hometown of Worcester, Mass., on May 20, 2011, against Luis Maysonet.

== Political career ==
In 2023 Rivera made the jump to politics originally announcing his run for a At-large seat on the Worcester city council before switching to the district 5 city councilor seat on the council where he was defeated by at the time incumbent Etel Haxhiaj in the election on November 7, 2023

In November 2024 he would announce a second run for the district 5 city councilor seat facing Etel Haxhiaj in a rematch on November 4, 2025 this time winning and becoming City Counciler-elect he would be inaugurated to the Worcester city council on January 2, 2026

== See also ==
- List of WBA world champions
- List of Puerto Rican boxing world champions

Sporting positions
Minor world boxing titles
Vacant Title last held by Kevin Lueshing	IBO welterweight champion April 25, 1997 – 1998; Vacated	Vacant Title next held by Dingaan Thobela
Major world boxing titles
New title	WBA (Regular) welterweight champion September 13, 2003–April 2, 2005	Succeeded by Luis Collazo
Preceded by Alejandro García	WBA light middleweight champion May 6, 2006–January 6, 2007	Succeeded by Travis Simms
