= Alejandro García (boxer) =

Mexican boxer (born 1979)

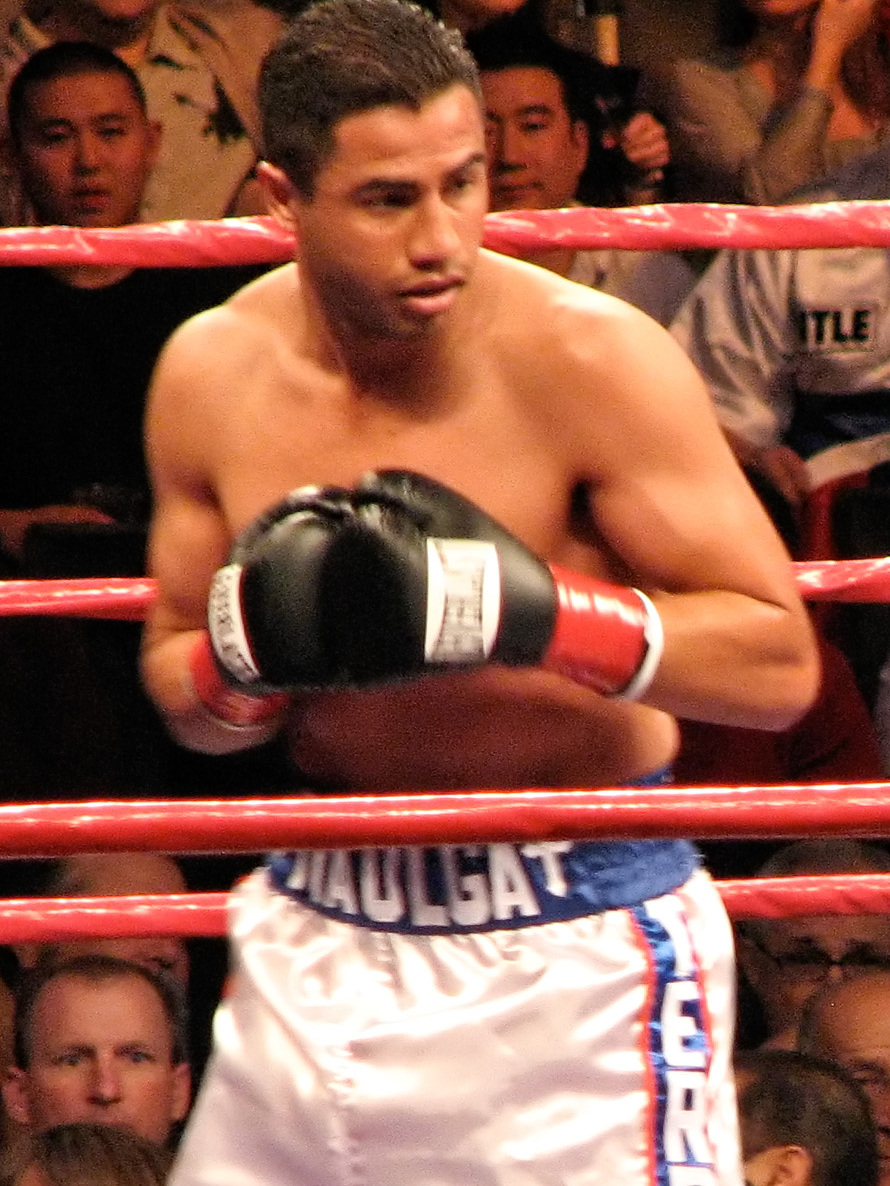

Personal information
- Nickname: Terra
- Born: Alejandro García Hernández; July 18, 1979 (age 46) Tijuana, Mexico
- Height: 5 ft 9 1/2 in (177 cm)
- Weight: Light middleweight

Boxing career
- Stance: Orthodox

Boxing record
- Total fights: 32
- Wins: 26
- Win by KO: 24
- Losses: 5
- Draws: 1

Alejandro García Hernández (born July 18, 1979) is a Mexican professional boxer in the super welterweight (154 lb) division.

== Professional career ==
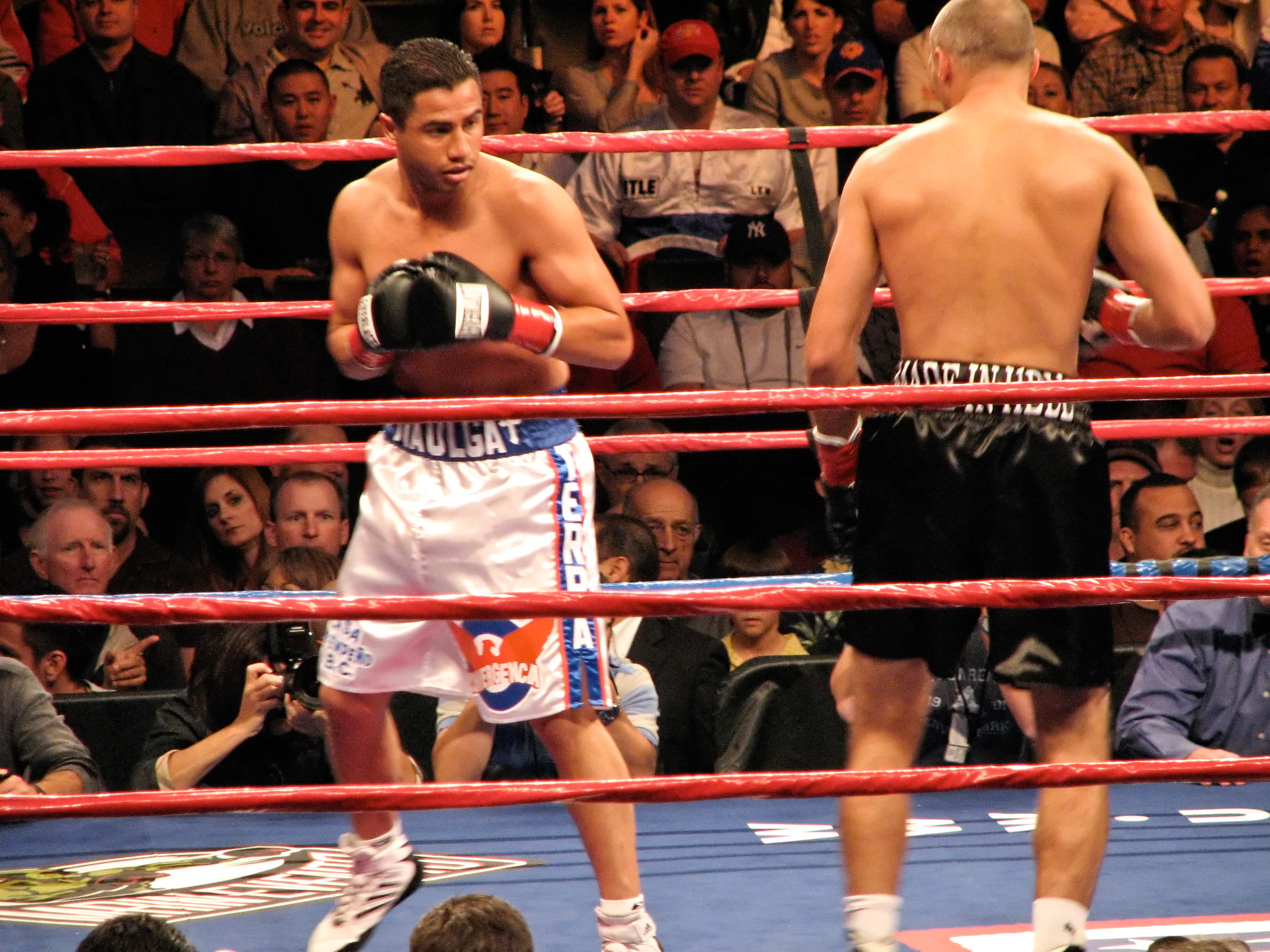
García (left) facing Roman Karmazin

Nicknamed "Terra", Garcia turned pro in 2000, winning his first 22 fights, including the WBA Light Middleweight Title by beating Santiago Samaniego in 2003. After a defense against former Olympian Rhoshii Wells, Garcia lost the belt to Travis Simms by 5th-round KO. In 2005 he captured the interim WBA Light Middleweight Title by again beating Wel

== Professional boxing record ==
32 fights	26 wins	5 losses
By knockout	24	4
By decision	2	1
Draws	1	
No contests	0	

No.	Result	Record	Opponent	Type	Round, time	Date	Location	Notes
32	Loss	26–5–1	(United States) Miguel Angel Espino	RTD	6 (10), 3:00	Mar 21, 2009	(United States) Playboy Mansion, Beverly Hills, California, U.S.	For CABOFE Middleweight title
31	Draw	26–4–1	(Mexico) Jose Luis Zertuche	MD	10	Nov 8, 2008	Auditorio Municipal, Tijuana, Baja California, Mexico	
30	Loss	26–4	(Mexico) Yori Boy Campas	KO	1 (10), 1:48	Jun 21, 2008	Auditorio Municipal, Tijuana, Baja California, Mexico	
29	Win	26–3	(Mexico) Jesus Arras Perea	UD	6	Apr 26, 2008	Plaza de Toros Juriquilla, Queretaro, Queretaro, Mexico	
28	Loss	25–3	(Russia) Roman Karmazin	KO	3 (12), 1:24	Nov 23, 2007	(United States) Staples Center, Los Angeles, California, U.S.	WBA Light middleweight title eliminator
27	Loss	25–2	(United States) José Antonio Rivera	UD	12	May 6, 2006	(United States) DCU Center, Worcester, Massachusetts, U.S.	Lost WBA Light middleweight title
26	Win	25–1	(Italy) Luca Messi	UD	12	Aug 13, 2005	(United States) United Center, Chicago, Illinois, U.S.	Retained WBA Light middleweight title
25	Win	24–1	(United States) Rhoshii Wells	TKO	9 (12), 2:59	May 21, 2005	(United States) United Center, Chicago, Illinois, U.S.	Won vacant WBA interim Light middleweight title
24	Win	23–1	(United States) Jonathan Corn	TKO	5 (8), 1:53	Sep 4, 2004	(United States) Mandalay Bay Events Center, Las Vegas, Nevada, U.S.	
23	Loss	22–1	(United States) Travis Simms	TKO	5 (12), 1:41	Dec 13, 2003	(United States) Boardwalk Hall, Atlantic City, New Jersey, U.S.	Lost WBA (Regular) light middleweight title
22	Win	22–0	(United States) Rhoshii Wells	RTD	10 (12), 3:00	Sep 20, 2003	(United States) Mohegan Sun Arena, Uncasville, Connecticut, U.S.	Retained WBA (Regular) light middleweight title
21	Win	21–0	(Panama) Santiago Samaniego	TKO	3 (12), 1:46	Mar 1, 2003	(United States) Thomas & Mack Center, Las Vegas, Nevada, U.S.	Won WBA (Regular) light middleweight title
20	Win	20–0	(United States) Vincent Harris	TKO	6 (8)	Oct 4, 2002	(United States) Miccosukee Indian Gaming Resort, Miami U.S.	
19	Win	19–0	(Puerto Rico) Melvin Cardona	TKO	3 (8)	May 11, 2002	Coliseo Roberto Clemente, San Juan Puerto Rico	
18	Win	18–0	(Mexico) Efrain Valenzuela	TKO	8 (12)	Dec 17, 2001	Tijuana, Baja California, Mexico	Won vacant NABO Super welterweight title
17	Win	17–0	(Mexico) Roberto Urias	TKO	2 (10)	Oct 20, 2001	Auditorio Municipal, Tijuana, Mexico	
16	Win	16–0	(Mexico) Juan Soberanes	TKO	5 (10)	Sep 14, 2001	Tijuana, Mexico	
15	Win	15–0	(Mexico) Ultiminio Segura	TKO	4 (10)	Aug 3, 2001	Tijuana, Mexico	
14	Win	14–0	(Mexico) Chris Sande	TKO	4 (10)	Jul 6, 2001	Frontón Palacio Jai Alai, Tijuana, Mexico	
13	Win	13–0	(Mexico) Efrain Valenzuela	TKO	2 (10)	May 4, 2001	Tijuana, Mexico	
12	Win	12–0	(Mexico) Francisco Castillo	TKO	3 (10)	Mar 2, 2001	Tijuana, Mexico	
11	Win	11–0	(Mexico) Miguel Gonzalez	TKO	2 (12)	Dec 14, 2000	Frontón Palacio Jai Alai, Tijuana, Mexico	Won vacant Mexican Pacific Coast Middleweight title
10	Win	10–0	(Mexico) Martin Perez	TKO	1 (8)	Oct 13, 2000	Tijuana, Mexico	
9	Win	9–0	(Mexico) Francisco Castillo	KO	4 (4)	Oct 2, 2000	Tijuana, Mexico	
8	Win	8–0	(Mexico) Federico Rojas	TKO	2 (6)	Sep 28, 2000	Tijuana, Mexico	
7	Win	7–0	(Mexico) Martin Perez	TKO	1 (4)	Sep 16, 2000	Tijuana, Mexico	
6	Win	6–0	(Mexico) Francisco Perez	TKO	2 (4)	Aug 11, 2000	Tijuana, Mexico	
5	Win	5–0	(Mexico) Antonio Contreras	TKO	1 (8)	Jul 22, 2000	Tijuana, Mexico	
4	Win	4–0	(Mexico) Eddy Cota	TKO	2 (6)	May 26, 2000	Tijuana, Mexico	
3	Win	3–0	(Mexico) Juan Lara	KO	1 (4)	Apr 7, 2000	Auditorio Municipal, Tijuana, Mexico	
2	Win	2–0	(Mexico) Victor Arzola	TKO	2 (4)	Mar 20, 2000	Tijuana, Mexico	
1	Win	1–0	(Mexico) Ernesto Zamora	KO	1 (4)	Feb 4, 2000	Tijuana, Mexico	

== See also ==
- List of light middleweight boxing champions
- List of Mexican boxing world champions

Sporting positions
World boxing titles
Preceded by Santiago Samaniego	WBA light middleweight champion Regular title March 1, 2003 – December 13, 2003	Succeeded by Travis Simms
Vacant Title last held by Santiago Samaniego	WBA light middleweight champion Interim title May 21, 2005 – June 2005; Promoted	Vacant Title next held by Nobuhiro Ishida
Preceded by Travis Simms; Stripped	WBA light middleweight champion June 2005 – May 6, 2006	Succeeded by Jose Antonio Rivera
