= Sam Akromah =

Ghanaian boxer

Personal information
- Nationality: Ghanaian
- Born: 19 March 1960 (age 66) Tamale, Ghana
- Height: 6 ft 0 in (183 cm)
- Weight: super feather/light/light welterweight

Boxing career

Boxing record
- Total fights: 28
- Wins: 16 (KO 7)
- Losses: 11 (KO 2)
- Draws: 1

Sam Akromah (born 19 March 1960) is a Ghanaian former professional boxer who competed from 1980 to 1995. He held the Ghanaian lightweight title, Ghanaian super featherweight title, and Commonwealth super featherweight title, and was a challenger for both the African Boxing Union lightweight title against Christopher Ossai, and Ghanaian light welterweight title against Kofi Jantuah. His professional fighting weight varied from super featherweight to light welterweight.
