= Harry Joe Yorgey =

American boxer

Harry Joe Yorgey (born November 20, 1977) is a former professional boxer. He attended Upper Merion High School in King of Prussia, Pennsylvania.

In 2009, he defeated Ronald Hearns to set himself up for a world title fight. He lost to Alfredo Angulo for the interim World Boxing Organization super welterweight title on HBO.

In 2013, Yorgey lost to future world champion Jermell Charlo on Showtime.

In 2014, he defeated Eric Mitchell.
