= Tarvis Simms =

American boxer

Personal information
- Nickname: Marvelous
- Nationality: American
- Born: May 1, 1971 Norwalk, Connecticut, United States
- Height: 5 ft 9 in (1.75 m)
- Weight: Middleweight

Boxing career
- Stance: Southpaw

Boxing record
- Total fights: 29
- Wins: 27
- Win by KO: 11
- Losses: 1
- Draws: 1
Medal record
Gold medal – first place	1993 National Golden Gloves	165 lbs

Tarvis Simms (born May 1, 1971, in Norwalk, Connecticut) is an American professional boxer in the Middleweight (160 lb) division.

== Background ==
Simms, who grew up in the Roodner Court Projects, is a native of the South Norwalk section of Norwalk, Connecticut. His childhood street bears the name "Travis Simms Way", named after his identical twin brother, Travis Simms, who is a former two-time World Boxing Association junior middleweight champion. The mayor presented Simms with a key to the city.

== Amateur career ==
Simms had a stellar amateur career, compiling a record of 197 wins and seven defeats. He was a National Golden Gloves champion in 1993 at Middleweight and defeated future super middleweight champion Byron Mitchell as well as future Olympic medalist Roshii Wells. Simms also competed in international tournaments and fought two-time Olympic gold medalist Ariel Hernández of Cuba.

== Pro career ==
Simms turned pro at the age of 26 and stopped his first seven opponents. Although he was undefeated for twelve years and rarely got hit due to his defensive skills, he saw limited action due to promotional difficulties. In 2005, he fought to a highly controversial draw in the hometown of Robert Frazier at the Turning Stone Casino in May, 2005. Following a two-year layoff, Simms won five straight fights before losing for the first time in late 2009 to title contender Allan Green by decision. Simms accepted the bout against Green on eight days' notice. After the close loss to Green, a bout which some ringsiders scored a draw, Simms signed with advisor Matt Yanofsky and inked a promotional deal with New Jersey–based Main Events. He won two consecutive bouts heading into 2012, with his eye on another significant fight.
