= Ronald Hearns =

American boxer

Personal information
- Nickname: The Chosen One
- Nationality: American
- Born: 27 December 1978 (age 47) Southfield, Michigan, United States
- Weight: Light middleweight

Boxing career
- Stance: orthodox

Boxing record
- Total fights: 29
- Wins: 26
- Win by KO: 20
- Losses: 6

Ronald Hearns (born 19 March 1978) is an American professional boxer and the son of Thomas Hearns.

Hearns fights at both the light middleweight and middleweight divisions.

== Background ==
Hearns began boxing as a teenager at Kronk and Butzel Gym’s in Detroit. However, his father, a former world champion had him barred from the gyms in order that he would concentrate on his education.

Hearns attended American University where he graduated with a degree in Criminal Justice. During his time at AU he played for the university basketball team, the Eagles.

Following this his father became supportive of his boxing and Hearns Jr. gained a record of 10-0 (10 KO) during his brief amateur career and won the 2004 National Middleweight Championship Title.

== Professional career ==
Hearns turned professional in April 2004 at the Joe Louis Arena in Detroit. In his debut Hearns defeated unbeaten novice Alex Black with a first round knockout. On March 28, 2009, in a televised bout, he was knocked out by Harry Joe Yorgey his first professional loss. He faced middleweight champion Felix Sturm February 19, 2011 and lost by KO in the 7th round.
