= Santiago Samaniego =

Panamanian boxer

Personal information
- Nickname: El Herrero
- Born: Santiago Ryce Samaniego; January 25, 1974 (age 52) Panama City, Panama
- Height: 1.80 m (5 ft 11 in)
- Weight: Light Middleweight

Boxing career
- Stance: Orthodox

Boxing record
- Total fights: 51
- Wins: 37
- Win by KO: 30
- Losses: 13
- Draws: 1

Santiago Nathaniel Ryce Samaniego (born January 25, 1974) is a Panamanian former boxer who competed from 1993 to 2007, with a comeback in 2011.

== Background ==
Samaniego is a first cousin of Roberto Durán.

== Professional career ==
Nicknamed "El Herrero", Samaniego turned pro in 1993 and in 1997 took on undefeated Mihai Leu for the vacant WBO Welterweight title, but lost a decision. In 2002 he faced Mamadou Thiam for the interim WBA Light Middleweight Title, and won in a 12th round stoppage. In 2003, he was TKO'd by Alejandro García, losing the belt. Since the loss, he dropped fights to Rhoshii Wells and Sechew Powell.

== See also ==
- List of light middleweight boxing champions

Sporting positions
World boxing titles
New title	WBA light middleweight champion Interim title August 10, 2002 - September 14, 2002; Promoted	Vacant Title next held by Alejandro García
New title	WBA light middleweight champion Regular title September 14, 2002 – March 1, 2003	Succeeded by Alejandro García
