= Andrey Tsurkan =

Ukrainian boxer

Personal information
- Nationality: Ukraine
- Born: Андрей Леонтьевич Цуркан; October 6, 1977 (age 48) Lugansk, Ukraine
- Weight: Super welterweight

Boxing career

Boxing record
- Total fights: 31
- Wins: 26
- Win by KO: 17
- Losses: 5
- Draws: 0

Andrey Tsurkan (born October 6, 1977 in Luhansk, Ukraine) is a light middleweight boxer from Ukraine.

== Pro career ==
On October 4, 2009 Herrera lost by 10th round T.K.O. to top light middleweight prospect, Mexican Alfredo Angulo. He is currently an athletic trainer in New York.
