= Bainbridge Bunting =

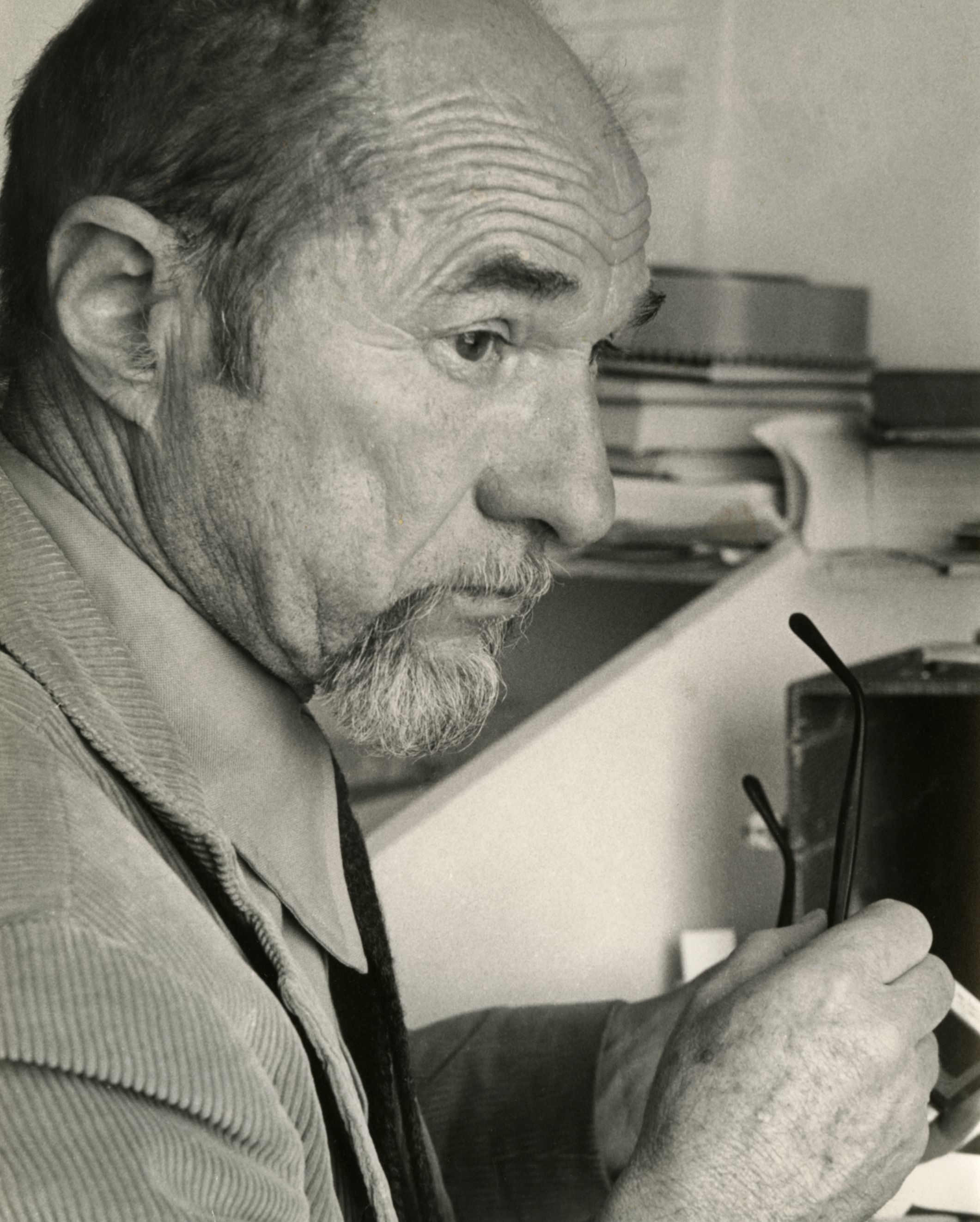
- Bunting c. 1970
- Born: November 23, 1913; Kansas City, Missouri, U.S.
- Died: February 13, 1981 (aged 67); Beverly, Massachusetts, U.S.
- Education: University of Illinois; Harvard University
- Occupations: Architectural historian, teacher, and author

Bainbridge Bunting (November 23, 1913 – February 13, 1981) was an American architectural historian, teacher, and author.

Bunting was born November 23, 1913, in Kansas City, Missouri. He graduated from the University of Illinois and later received his Ph.D. from Harvard University. Beginning in 1948, he was a faculty member of the University of New Mexico Art Department until his retirement in 1979. Bunting wrote numerous articles and three books on the architecture of New Mexico, and was noted for his expertise in adobe architecture, the Zuni Pueblo and the architecture of John Gaw Meem.

Bunting is credited by architectural historian Marcus Whiffen with having re-introduced the term "Châteauesque" to describe the architectural style previously and more generally known as "Chateau Style" or "French Chateau Style."

Bunting died February 13, 1981, in Beverly, Massachusetts.

== Writings ==
- Houses of Boston's Back Bay: An Architectural History, 1840–1917
- Harvard: An Architectural History (Belknap Press)
- Early Architecture in New Mexico University of New Mexico Press, Albuquerque, 1976 ISBN 0-8263-0424-9
- Taos adobes : Spanish colonial and territorial architecture of the Taos
- Survey of Architectural History in Cambridge
- John Gaw Meem: Southwestern Architect, School of American Research Book, University of New Mexico Press, Albuquerque, NM, 1983
- Of Earth and Timbers Made: New Mexico Architecture
