= IBA Youth and Junior World Boxing Championships =

Boxing competitions

Youth and Junior World Boxing Championships
- Status: Active
- Genre: Sports event
- Date: Midyear
- Frequency: Annual
- Inaugurated: 1979 (U19) / 2001 (U17)
- Organiser: IBA

The IBA Youth World Boxing Championships and the IBA Junior World Boxing Championships are amateur boxing competitions organised by the International Boxing Association (IBA), the sport's governing body, for "Youth" competitors—ages 17 or 18 years old (U19), and for "Junior" competitors—ages 15 or 16 years old (U17), respectively. The Youth world championship began in 1979 in Yokohama, Japan, and has been held biennially since 1990. The Junior world championship began in 2001 in Baku, Azerbaijan, and has been held biennially since 2007.

== History ==
The competitions are under the supervision of the world's governing body for amateur boxing AIBA and are the younger versions of the World Amateur Boxing Championships. Starting from 2008, the Junior world championships, which ran from 1979 to 2006, was renamed the Youth World Boxing Championships. Starting from 2009, the Cadet world championships, which ran from 2001 to 2007, was renamed the Junior World Boxing Championships.

== Youth (Junior) Championships (U19) ==
=== Men ===
- 17–18 years in 10 weight classes
- http://amateur-boxing.strefa.pl/Championships/WorldJuniorChamps.html
- http://www.aiba.org/aiba-youth-world-boxing-championships/

Number	Year	Host	Dates
Junior World Championship
1	1979	Yokohama, Japan	December 9 – 16
2	1983	Santo Domingo, Dominican Republic	September 17 – 24
3	1985	Bucharest, Romania	September 1–9
4	1987	Havana, Cuba	June 25 – July 6
5	1989	Bayamón, Puerto Rico	August 9–17
6	1990	Lima, Peru	October 13–20
7	1992	Montreal, Canada	September 25 - October 4
8	1994	Istanbul, Turkey	September 8–18
9	1996	Havana, Cuba	November 4–10
10	1998	Buenos Aires, Argentina	November 6–16
11	2000	Budapest, Hungary	November 5–12
12	2002	Santiago de Cuba, Cuba	September 15–22
13	2004	Jeju, South Korea	June 12–18
14	2006	Agadir, Morocco	September 8–18
Youth World Championship
15	2008	Guadalajara, Mexico	October 31 – November 1
16	2010	Baku, Azerbaijan	April 20 – May 2
17	2012	Yerevan, Armenia	November 25 – December 8
19	2016	Saint Petersburg, Russia	November 17 – 26

=== Women ===
- Youth: 17–18 years in 10 weight classes
- http://amateur-boxing.strefa.pl/Championships/World_wom_Champs_J.html
- http://www.aiba.org/aiba-womens-youthjunior-world-boxing-championships/

Number	Year	Host	Dates
1	2011	Antalya, Turkey	April 20 – 30
2	2013	Albena, Bulgaria	September 22–28
3	2015	Taipei, Taiwan	May 16 – 23
4	2017	Guwahati, India	November 19 – 26

=== Combined (Men and Women) ===
Number	Year	Host	Dates
18	2014	Sofia, Bulgaria	April 14 – 24
20	2018	Budapest, Hungary	August 21 – 31
21	2021	Kielce, Poland	April 10 – 24
22	2022	La Nucia, Spain	November 14 – 26
23	2024	Budva, Montenegro	October 22 – November 3
24	2025	Shizuoka, Japan	January 2025

== Junior (Cadet) Championships (U17) ==
=== Men ===
- 15–16 years in 13 weight classes
- http://amateur-boxing.strefa.pl/Championships/WorldCadetChampionships.html
- http://www.aiba.org/aiba-junior-world-boxing-championships/

Number	Year	Host	Dates
Cadet World Championship
1	2001	Baku, Azerbaijan	October 11–21
2	2002	Kecskemét, Hungary	May 3 – 13
3	2003	Bucharest, Romania	June 20–29
4	2005	Liverpool, England	October 10–18
5	2006	Istanbul, Turkey	August 3–13
6	2007	Baku, Azerbaijan	August 31 – September 9
Junior World Championship
7	2009	Yerevan, Armenia	May 23–30
8	2011	Astana, Kazakhstan	July 23–30
9	2013	Kyiv, Ukraine	September 8–15
10	2015	Saint Petersburg, Russia	September 4–12

=== Women ===
- Junior: 15–16 years in 13 weight classes
- http://amateur-boxing.strefa.pl/Championships/World_wom_Champs_J.html
- http://www.aiba.org/aiba-womens-youthjunior-world-boxing-championships/

Number	Year	Host	Dates
1	2011	Antalya, Turkey	April 20 – 30
2	2015	Taipei, Taiwan	May 16 – 23
3	2017	Guwahati, India	November 19 – 26

=== Combined (Men and Women) ===
Number	Year	Host	Dates
1	2023	Yerevan, Armenia	November 23 – December 4

== See also ==
- European Amateur Boxing Championships
- World Amateur Boxing Championships
- Boxing World Cup

== Results ==
- http://amateur-boxing.strefa.pl/Championships/AAAChampionships.html
- http://www.aiba.org/
