= Abel Sanchez =

Mexican-American boxing trainer

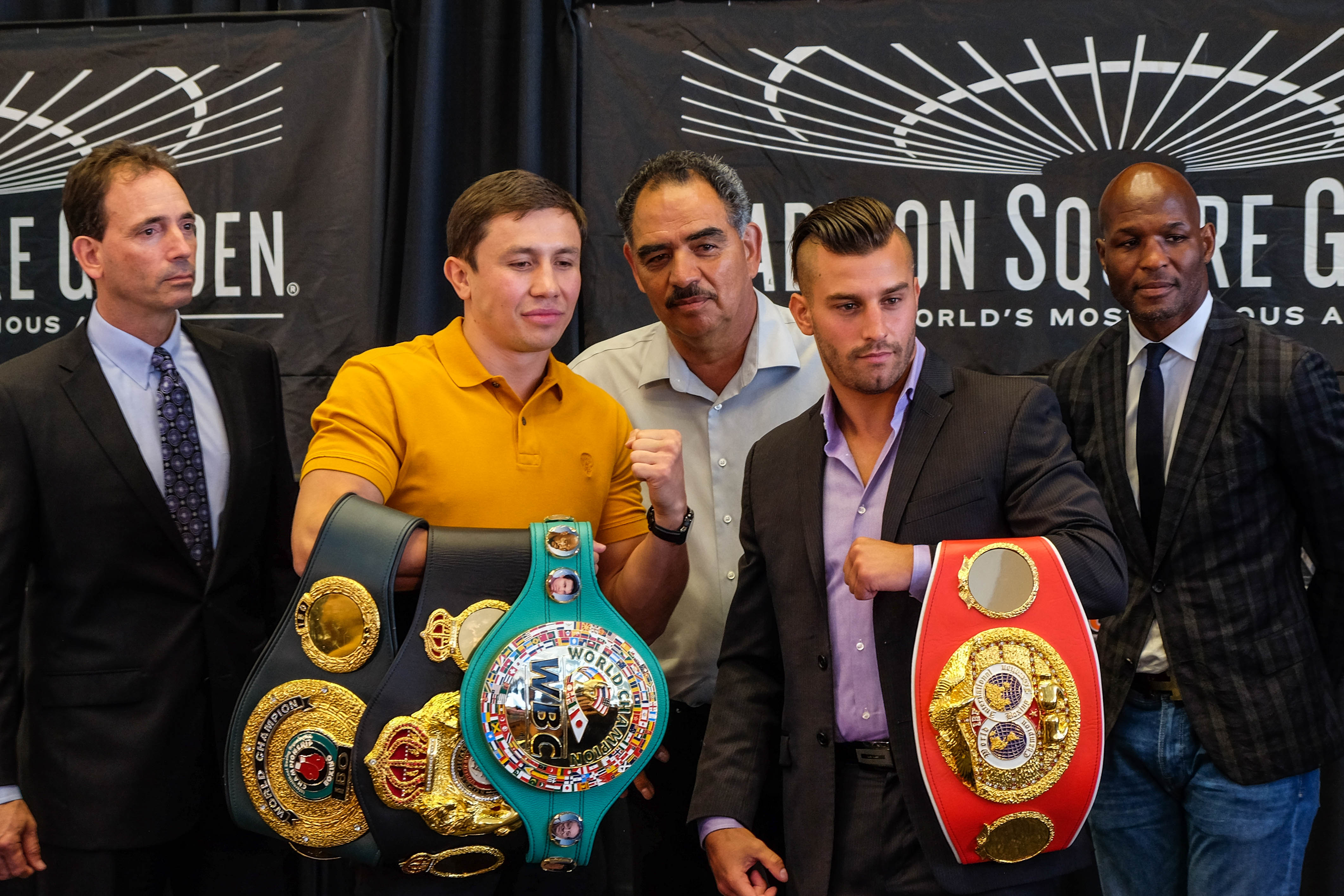
- Sanchez (center) in 2015

Abel Sanchez is a Mexican-American boxing trainer. He is best known as the coach of IBF world champion Filip Hrgović, and has trained other boxers such as Gennady Golovkin, Lupe Aquino, Terry Norris, Murat Gassiev, and Arsen Goulamirian.

== Early life ==
Sanchez was born in Tijuana, Mexico in 1955 and immigrated to San Marin, California with his family at the age of six.

== Boxing trainer ==
The first three boxers he trained, Lupe Aquino, Terry Norris, and Orlin Norris, all became world champions. He went on to train other world champions during the 1990s, including Miguel Ángel González, Paul Vaden, Frans Botha, and Nana Konadu.

=== Summit Gym and later career ===
In 2000, he built a house in Big Bear, California to conduct fighters' training camps. The house, which is nicknamed The Summit, was initially intended for Sanchez's friend and famed trainer Emanuel Steward to use to conduct training camps and was built at altitude in order to help athletes improve their aerobic conditioning. However, the training center remained largely unused while Sanchez recovered from a heart attack in 2001. This changed when Oscar De La Hoya rented it to prepare for his 2008 bout with Manny Pacquiao.

Shortly afterwards, Sanchez met with Gennady Golovkin and returned to training after being impressed with Golovkin's talent. Sanchez and Golovkin split after nine years due to a money row following Golovkin's $100m deal with DAZN.

Since then, he's worked with other active boxers like Sullivan Barrera, Murat Gassiev, Denis Shafikov, Michel Soro, Alfredo Angulo, Filip Hrgovic, Joe Joyce and Arsen Goulamirian.

=== Recognition ===
In 2015, Sanchez won the Futch-Condon, an award given by the Boxing Writers Association of America to honor the best trainer of the year.

== Other ventures ==
Sanchez owned and operated a construction company until 2008.
