= Vaiden =

Vaiden may refer to:

== Fictional characters ==
- Kate Vaiden, a 1986 American novel by Reynolds Price, also the name of the narrator
- Colonel Miltiades "Milt" Vaiden, the protagonist in the 1932 novel The Store by T. S. Stribling

== Places ==
- Vaiden, Alabama, United States, an unincorporated community in Perry County
  - Vaiden Field Airport, an airport in the county
- Vaiden, Mississippi, United States, a town in Carroll County

== See also ==
- Vaden, given name and surname
