= List of world light-middleweight boxing champions =

This is a chronological List of World Super Welterweight / Junior Middleweight / Light Middleweight Boxing Champions, as recognized by four of the better-known sanctioning organizations:

- The World Boxing Association (WBA), founded in 1921 as the National Boxing Association (NBA),
- The World Boxing Council (WBC), founded in 1963,
- The International Boxing Federation (IBF), founded in 1983,
- The World Boxing Organization (WBO), founded in 1988,

Reign Began	Reign Ended	Champion	Recognition
World
Title inaugurated
1962-10-20	1963-04-29	(United States) Denny Moyer	Universal (WBA/WBC)
1963-04-29	1963-09-07	(United States) Ralph Dupas	Universal (WBA/WBC)
1963-09-07	1965-06-18	(Italy) Sandro Mazzinghi	Universal (WBA/WBC)
1965-06-18	1966-06-25	(Italy) Nino Benvenuti	Universal (WBA/WBC)
1966-06-25	1968-05-26	(South Korea) Ki-Soo Kim	Universal (WBA/WBC)
1968-05-26	1968-10-25-Stripped	(Italy) Sandro Mazzinghi	Universal (WBA/WBC)
1969-03-17	1970-07-09	(United States) Freddie Little	Universal (WBA/WBC)
1970-07-09	1971-10-31	(Italy) Carmelo Bossi	Universal (WBA/WBC)
1971-10-31	1974-06-04	(Japan) Koichi Wajima	Universal (WBA/WBC)
1974-06-04	1975-01-21	(United States) Oscar Albarado	Universal (WBA/WBC)
1975-01-21	1975-03-22-Title Split	(Japan) Koichi Wajima	Universal (WBA/WBC)
WBC
Title Inaugurated
1963-02-19	1963-04-29	(United States) Denny Moyer	WBC
1963-04-29	1963-09-07	(United States) Ralph Dupas	WBC
1963-09-07	1965-06-18	(Italy) Sandro Mazzinghi	WBC
1965-06-18	1966-06-25	(Italy) Nino Benvenuti	WBC
1966-06-25	1968-05-26	(South Korea) Ki Soo Kim	WBC
1968-05-26	1968-11-Stripped	(Italy) Sandro Mazzinghi	WBC
1969-03-17	1970-07-09	(United States) Freddie Little	WBC
1970-07-09	1971-10-31	(Italy) Carmelo Bossi	WBC
1971-10-31	1974-06-04	(Japan) Koichi Wajima	WBC
1974-06-04	1975-01-21	(United States) Oscar Albarado	WBC
1975-01-21	1975-04-Stripped	(Japan) Koichi Wajima	WBC
1975-05-07	1975-11-13	(Brazil) Miguel de Oliveira	WBC
1975-11-13	1976-06-17	(The Bahamas) Elisha Obed	WBC
1976-06-17	1977-08-06	(Germany) Eckhard Dagge	WBC
1977-08-06	1979-03-04	(Australia) Rocky Mattioli	WBC
1979-03-04	1981-05-23	(United Kingdom) Maurice Hope	WBC
1981-05-23	1982-12-03	(Puerto Rico) Wilfred Benítez	WBC
1982-12-03	1986-06-23-Vacated	(United States) Thomas Hearns	WBC
1986-12-05	1987-07-12	(United States) Duane Thomas	WBC
1987-07-12	1987-10-02	(Mexico) Lupe Aquino	WBC
1987-10-02	1988-07-08	(Italy) Gianfranco Rosi	WBC
1988-07-08	1989-02-11	(United States) Donald Curry	WBC
1989-02-11	1989-07-08	(France) Rene Jacquot	WBC
1989-07-08	1990-03-31	(Uganda) John Mugabi	WBC
1990-03-31	1993-12-18	(United States) Terry Norris	WBC
1993-12-18	1994-05-07	(Jamaica) Simon Brown	WBC
1994-05-07	1994-11-12	(United States) Terry Norris	WBC
1994-11-12	1995-08-19	(Dominican Republic) Luis Santana	WBC
1995-08-19	1997-12-06	(United States) Terry Norris	WBC
1997-12-06	1999-01-29	(United States) Keith Mullings	WBC
1999-01-29	2001-06-23	(Spain) Javier Castillejo	WBC
2001-06-23	2003-09-13	(United States) Oscar De La Hoya	WBC
2003-09-13	2004-03-13	(United States) Shane Mosley	WBC
2004-03-13	2004-11-20-Vacated	(United States) Winky Wright	WBC
2004-11-20	2005-06-01-Stripped	(Spain) Javier Castillejo	WBC
2005-08-13	2006-05-06	(Nicaragua) Ricardo Mayorga	WBC
2006-05-06	2007-05-05	(United States) Oscar De La Hoya	WBC
2007-05-05	2007-06-28-Vacated	(United States) Floyd Mayweather Jr.	WBC
2007-07-28	2008-06-07	(United States) Vernon Forrest	WBC
2008-06-07	2008-09-13	(United States) Sergio Mora	WBC
2008-09-13	2009-05-21-Stripped	(United States) Vernon Forrest	WBC
2009-05-21	2010-06-17-Vacated	(Argentina) Sergio Martinez	WBC
2010-11-13	2011-02-08-Vacated	(Philippines) Manny Pacquiao	WBC
2011-03-05	2013-09-14	(Mexico) Saul Alvarez	WBC
2013-09-14	2015-11-01-Changed status to WBC Emeritus	(United States) Floyd Mayweather Jr.	WBC
2016-05-21	2018-12-22	(United States) Jermell Charlo	WBC
2018-12-22	2019-12-21	(United States) Tony Harrison (boxer)	WBC
2019-12-21	2024-01-26-Vacated	(United States) Jermell Charlo	WBC
2024-03-31	Present	(United States) Sebastian Fundora	WBC
WBA
Title Inaugurated
1962-10-20	1963-04-29	(United States) Denny Moyer	WBA
1963-04-29	1963-09-07	(United States) Ralph Dupas	WBA
1963-09-07	1965-06-18	(Italy) Sandro Mazzinghi	WBA
1965-06-18	1966-06-25	(Italy) Nino Benvenuti	WBA
1966-06-25	1968-05-26	(South Korea) Kim Ki-soo	WBA
1968-05-26	1968-11-Stripped	(Italy) Alessandro Mazzinghi	WBA
1969-03-17	1970-07-09	(United States) Freddie Little	WBA
1970-07-09	1971-10-31	(Italy) Carmelo Bossi	WBA
1971-10-31	1974-06-04	(Japan) Koichi Wajima	WBA
1974-06-04	1975-06-07	(United States) Oscar Albarado	WBA
1975-01-21	1975-06-07	(Japan) Koichi Wajima	WBA
1975-06-07	1976-02-17	(South Korea) Yuh Jae-doo	WBA
1976-02-17	1976-05-18	(Japan) Koichi Wajima	WBA
1976-05-18	1976-10-08	(Spain) Jose Manuel Duran	WBA
1976-10-08	1977-03-05	(Argentina) Miguel Ángel Castellini	WBA
1977-03-05	1978-08-09	(Nicaragua) Eddie Gazo	WBA
1978-08-09	1979-10-24	(Japan) Masashi Kudo	WBA
1979-10-24	1981-06-25	(Uganda) Ayub Kalule	WBA
1981-06-25	1981-06-25-Vacated	(United States) Sugar Ray Leonard	WBA
1981-11-07	1982-02-02	(Japan) Tadashi Mihara	WBA
1982-02-02	1983-06-16	(United States) Davey Moore	WBA
1983-06-16	1984-Stripped	(Panama) Roberto Durán	WBA
1984-10-19	1987-07-18-Vacated	(Jamaica) Mike McCallum	WBA
1987-11-22	1991-02-23-Vacated	(United States Virgin Islands) Julian Jackson	WBA
1991-02-23	1991-10-01	(France) Gilbert Delé	WBA
1991-10-01	1992-12-21	(United States) Vinny Paz	WBA
1992-12-21	1995-03-04	(Argentina) Julio César Vásquez	WBA
1995-03-04	1995-Vacated	(United States) Pernell Whitaker	WBA
1995-06-16	1995-12-16	(United States) Carl Daniels	WBA
1995-12-16	1996-08-21	(Argentina) Julio César Vásquez	WBA
1996-08-21	1999-03-06	(France) Laurent Boudouani	WBA
1999-03-06	2000-03-03	(United States) David Reid	WBA
2000-03-03	2000-12-02-Vacated	(Puerto Rico) Félix Trinidad	WBA
2001-09-22	2002-09-14	(United States) Fernando Vargas	WBA
2002-09-14	2003-09-13	(United States) Oscar De La Hoya	WBA Super Champion
2002-09-14	2003-03-01	(Panama) Santiago Samaniego	WBA Regular Champion
2003-03-01	2003-12-13	(Mexico) Alejandro Garcia	WBA Regular Champion
2003-09-13	2004-03-13	(United States) Shane Mosley	WBA Super Champion
2003-12-13	2004-10-02-Stripped	(United States) Travis Simms	WBA Regular Champion
2004-03-13	2004-11-20-Vacated	(United States) Winky Wright	WBA Super Champion
2005-05-21	2006-05-06	(Mexico) Alejandro Garcia	WBA
2006-05-06	2007-01-06	(United States) José Antonio Rivera	WBA
2007-01-06	2007-07-07	(United States) Travis Simms	WBA
2007-07-07	2008-07-11	(Canada) Joachim Alcine	WBA
2008-07-11	2009-11-14	(Puerto Rico) Daniel Santos	WBA
2009-11-14	2010-06-06	(Israel) Yuri Foreman	WBA
2010-06-06	2012-05-05	(Puerto Rico) Miguel Cotto	WBA Super Champion
2011-02-05	2013-04-20	(United States) Austin Trout	WBA Regular Champion
2012-05-05	2016-01-11-Stripped after retirement	(United States) Floyd Mayweather Jr.	WBA Super Champion
2013-04-20	2013-09-14-Lost to Super Champion	(Mexico) Canelo Álvarez	WBA Regular Champion
2016-06-08	2018-04-07	(Cuba) Erislandy Lara	WBA Super Champion
2016-10-22	2019-06-25-Stripped	(Argentina) Brian Castaño	WBA Regular Champion
2018-04-07	2019-05-11	(United States) Jarrett Hurd	WBA Super Champion
2019-05-11	2020-01-18	(United States) Julian Williams	WBA Super Champion
2019-08-31	2021-08-31-Vacated	(United States) Erislandy Lara	WBA Regular Champion
2020-01-18	2020-09-26	(Dominican Republic) Jeison Rosario	WBA Super Champion
2020-09-26	2024-03-05-Vacated	(United States) Jermell Charlo	WBA Super Champion
2024-03-08	2024-08-03	(Uzbekistan) Israil Madrimov	WBA
2024-08-03	2025-09-13-Stripped	(United States) Terence Crawford	WBA
2025-09-13	2026-01-31	(Germany) Abass Baraou	WBA
2026-01-31	Present	(Puerto Rico) Xander Zayas	WBA
IBF
Title inaugurated
1984-03-11	1984-11-02	(United States) Mark Medal	IBF
1984-11-02	1985-06-01-Vacated	(Puerto Rico) Carlos Santos	IBF
1986-06-04	1987-06-27	(United States) Buster Drayton	IBF
1987-06-27	1988-11-04	(Canada) Matthew Hilton	IBF
1988-11-04	1989-02-05	(United States) Robert Hines	IBF
1989-02-05	1989-07-15	(United States) Darrin Van Horn	IBF
1989-07-15	1994-09-17	(Italy) Gianfranco Rosi	IBF
1994-09-17	1995-08-12	(United States) Vincent Pettway	IBF
1995-08-12	1995-12-16	(United States) Paul Vaden	IBF
1995-12-16	1997-01-11-Vacated	(United States) Terry Norris	IBF
1997-04-12	1997-12-06	(United States) Raúl Márquez	IBF
1997-12-06	1998-12-12	(Mexico) Yori Boy Campas	IBF
1998-12-12	2000-12-02	(United States) Fernando Vargas	IBF
2000-12-02	2001-05-12-Vacated	(Puerto Rico) Félix Trinidad	IBF
2001-10-12	2004-03-13-Vacated	(United States) Winky Wright	IBF
2004-06-05	2004-10-02	(Belize) Verno Phillips	IBF
2004-10-02	2005-07-14	(Uganda) Kassim Ouma	IBF
2005-07-14	2006-07-08	(Russia) Roman Karmazin	IBF
2006-07-08	2008-03-27	(United States) Cory Spinks	IBF
2008-03-27	2008-11-Vacated	(Belize) Verno Phillips	IBF
2009-04-24	2010-08-07	(United States) Cory Spinks	IBF
2010-08-07	2013-02-23	(United States) Cornelius Bundrage	IBF
2013-02-23	2013-09-14	(United States) Ishe Smith	IBF
2013-09-14	2014-10-11	(Mexico) Carlos Molina	IBF
2014-10-11	2015-09-12	(United States) Cornelius Bundrage	IBF
2015-09-12	2017-02-16-Vacated	(United States) Jermall Charlo	IBF
2017-02-25	2019-05-11	(United States) Jarrett Hurd	IBF
2019-05-11	2020-01-18	(United States) Julian Williams	IBF
2020-01-18	2020-09-26	(Dominican Republic) Jeison Rosario	IBF
2020-09-26	2023-11-23-Vacated	(United States) Jermell Charlo	IBF
2024-04-06	2026-31-01	(Russia) Bakhram Murtazaliev	IBF
2026-01-31	Present	(United Kingdom) Josh Kelly	IBF
WBO
Title inaugurated
1988-12-08	1992-12-19-Vacated	(United States) John David Jackson	WBO
1993-10-30	1995-11-22	(Belize) Verno Phillips	WBO
1995-11-22	1996-02-Stripped	(United Kingdom) Paul Jones	WBO
1996-03-01	1996-05-17	(United States) Bronco McKart	WBO
1996-05-17	1998-08-22	(United States) Winky Wright	WBO
1998-08-22	2001-02-10-Vacated	(Namibia) Harry Simon	WBO
2002-03-16	2005-12-03	(Puerto Rico) Daniel Santos	WBO
2005-12-03	2011-10-05-Stripped	(Ukraine) Serhiy Dzyndzyruk	WBO
2011-10-05	2013-07-22-Stripped	(Russia) Zaurbek Baysangurov	WBO
2013-11-09	2015-07-31-Stripped	(United States) Demetrius Andrade	WBO
2015-10-10	2016- 09-17	(United Kingdom) Liam Smith	WBO
2016-09-17	2017-05-06-Vacated	(Mexico) Canelo Álvarez	WBO
2017-08-26	2017-12-02	(Puerto Rico) Miguel Cotto	WBO
2017-12-02	2018-05-12	(United States) Sadam Ali	WBO
2018-05-12	2019-11-23-Vacated	(Mexico) Jaime Munguía	WBO
2019-11-30	2021-02-13	(Brazil) Patrick Teixeira	WBO
2021-02-13	Present	(Argentina) Brian Castaño	WBO
2021-02-13	2023-09-30	(United States) Jermell Charlo	WBO
2023-09-30	2024-03-31	(Australia) Tim Tszyu	WBO
2024-03-31	2025-02-05-Stripped	(United States) Sebastian Fundora	WBO
2025-07-26	Present	(Puerto Rico) Xander Zayas	WBO

== See also ==
- List of British world boxing champions
