= Julio César Chávez vs. Tony Lopez =

Professional boxing match

Noches de Campeones: Chávez vs. Lopez
- Date: December 10, 1994
- Venue: Estadio Mobil Super, Monterrey, Mexico
- Title(s) on the line: WBC super lightweight title

Tale of the tape
Boxer	Julio César Chávez	Tony Lopez
Nickname	El Gran Campeón Mexicano ("The Great Mexican Champion")	The Tiger
Hometown	Ciudad Obregón, Sonora, Mexico	Sacramento, California, U.S.
Pre-fight record	91–1–1 (78 KO)	45–4–1 (32 KO)
Age	32 years, 4 months	31 years, 9 months
Height	5 ft 7 in (170 cm)	5 ft 6 in (168 cm)
Weight	140 lb (64 kg)	139 lb (63 kg)
Style	Orthodox	Orthodox
Recognition	WBC; Super Lightweight Champion; The Ring; No. 2 Ranked Light Welterweight; 3-division World Champion	WBC; No. 2 Ranked Super Lightweight; The Ring; No. 6 Ranked Light Welterweight; 2-division World Champion

Result
- Chavez wins via 10th-round technical knockout

Julio César Chávez vs. Tony Lopez was a professional boxing match contested on December 10, 1994, for the WBC super lightweight title. The fight was the featured bout on a boxing card promoted by Don King dubbed Noches de Campeones (Night of Champions in Spanish).

== Background ==
On October 6, 1994, promoter Don King announced that WBC super lightweight Julio César Chávez would headline the boxing card Noches de Campeones in his native Mexico against former three-time world champion Tony Lopez. Along with the Chávez–Lopez main event, the card also featured IBF welterweight champion Félix Trinidad defending his title against Oba Carr, WBA middleweight John David Jackson defending against Jorge Castro, Frankie Randall vs. Rodney Moore for the WBA super lightweight title and WBC strawweight champion Ricardo López vs. Yamil Caraball. This was King's fourth super card of 1994 to be headlined by a Chávez title fight. There were tentative plans for the card to be headlined by a third Chávez–Randall fight, though talks stalled and the two appeared in separate fights on the card.

In the days prior to the fight Chávez insisted that his fight against Lopez would be the beginning of a year-long farewell as he had announced his intentions to retire at the end of 1995 following a further six fights to get him to 100 professional fights. Chávez promised a rematch with Pernell Whitaker and third fight with Randall, which he planned to be his final fight, would be among the bouts he had planned for 1995. However, his planned rematch with Whitaker never came to be and a third fight with Randall would not occur until 2004, while Chávez himself would hold off his retirement until a decade later in 2005.

== The fights ==
=== Castro vs. Jackson ===
WBA middleweight champion Jorge Castro (The Ring:4th) would make the second defence of his title against unbeaten former champion and number two ranked John David Jackson (The Ring:2nd).

Jackson was attempting to regain the WBA middleweight title after being stripped of the title earlier in the year for taking a non-title fight against Jeff Johnson on the undercard of the Lennox Lewis–Phil Jackson heavyweight title fight without the permission of the WBA, while Castro, had claimed the vacant title in August after decisioning Reggie Johnson.

==== The fight ====
Jackson had dominated Castro through the first eight rounds and Castro sported cuts above both eyes. Jackson continued his dominance into the ninth and with around a minute to go in the round, caught Castro flush with a left hook that stunned the champion and sent him staggering into the ropes. Looking to knockout his hurt opponent, Jackson swung wildly at Castro, leaving him open for Castro to counter with a left hook that sent Jackson down to the Canvas. Clearly hurt from the blow, Jackson answered the referee's count but was on wobbly legs as Castro quickly rushed him and sent him down again. Jackson again struggled back to his feet but Castro again sent him down with a left hand. Following the third knockdown, the fight was stopped with 17 second remaining in the round.

==== Aftermath ====
The fight was critically acclaimed, being named The Ring magazine's 1994 fight of the year, while the bout's ninth round would also win the publication's round of the year as well.

Preceded by vs. Alex Ramos	Jorge Castro's bouts 10 December 1994	Succeeded by vs. Anthony Andrews
Preceded by vs. Danny Garcia	John David Jackson's bouts 10 December 1994	Succeeded by vs. James Green
Awards
Preceded by Michael Carbajal vs. Humberto González	The Ring Fight of the Year; 1994	Succeeded by Humberto González vs. Saman Sorjaturong
Preceded by Terry Norris vs. Troy Waters; Round 2	The Ring Round of the Year; Round 9; 1994	Succeeded by Humberto González vs. Saman Sorjaturong; Round 7

=== Trinidad vs. Carr ===
Making the fifth defence of his IBF Welterweight title Félix Trinidad (The Ring:2nd) faced number two ranked contender Oba Carr (The Ring:8th).

==== The fight ====
In the second round, Carr scored a knockdown, which was the product of a quick right hand punch. Trinidad continued the fight and pursued the challenger, who displayed a quick pace throughout the fight. In the fourth round Trinidad connected a solid punch that injured Carr, and in the eighth he scored three consecutive knockdowns before the referee stopped the fight by technical knockout.

Preceded by vs. Yori Boy Campas	Félix Trinidad's bouts 10 December 1994	Succeeded by vs. Roger Turner
Preceded by vs. Antonio Ojeda	Oba Carr's bouts 10 December 1994	Succeeded by vs. Alfredo Rojas

=== Main Event ===
Chávez put forth a dominating effort, winning nearly every round on the judge's scorecards and battering Lopez throughout the fight. The turning point of the fight came in the fourth round when Chávez opened a cut above Lopez's left eye, an injury that got progressively worse as the fight went on. By the following round, the eye was almost completely shut and the cut began to bleed, causing the ringside doctor to examine Lopez after each round to make sure he could continue. After Chávez opened another cut above Lopez's right eye, Lopez was warned after the ninth round that he would only have one more round before the fight would be stopped. However, with Lopez's eye beginning to swell after constant abuse from Chávez, referee stopped the fight at 1:41 in order for the doctor to check on Lopez's condition. Against Lopez's wishes, the doctor stopped the fight, giving Chávez the victory by technical knockout.

== Fight card ==
Confirmed bouts:

Weight Class	Weight		vs.		Method	Round	Notes
Super Lightweight	140 lbs.	Julio César Chávez (c)	def.	Tony Lopez	TKO	10/12	^{Note 1}
Welterweight	147 lbs.	Félix Trinidad (c)	def.	Oba Carr	KO	8/12	^{Note 2}
Middleweight	160 lbs.	Jorge Castro (c)	def.	John David Jackson	KO	9/12	^{Note 3}
Super Lightweight	140 lbs.	Frankie Randall (c)	def.	Rodney Moore	TKO	7/12	^{Note 4}
Strawweight	105 lbs.	Ricardo López (c)	def.	Yamil Caraball	TKO	1/12	^{Note 5}
Super Flyweight	115 lbs.	Joel Luna Zárate	def.	Alcibiades Gallegos	TKO	4/10
Heavyweight	200+ lbs.	Tony Tucker	def.	Dan Murphy	TKO	3/10
Super Welterweight	154 lbs.	Maurice Blocker	def.	Hector Lopez	TKO	4/10
Heavyweight	200+ lbs.	Bobby Crabtree	def.	King Ipitan	KO	1/10
Featherweight	126 lbs.	Jose Badillo	def.	Carlos Ramirez	TKO	3/8

^Note 1 For WBC Super Lightweight title
^Note 2 For IBF Welterweight title
^Note 3 For WBA Middlewight title
^Note 4 For WBA Super Lightweight title
^Note 5 For WBC Strawweight title

== Broadcasting ==
Country	Broadcaster
United States	Showtime
Thailand	Channel 7

Preceded by vs. Meldrick Taylor II	Julio César Chávez's bouts 10 December 1994	Succeeded by vs. Giovanni Parisi
Preceded by vs. Greg Haugen	Tony Lopez's bouts 10 December 1994	Succeeded by vs. Freddie Pendleton
