= Julio César Chávez vs. Meldrick Taylor II =

Boxing match

Unfinished Business
- Date: September 17, 1994
- Venue: MGM Grand Garden Arena, Paradise, Nevada, U.S.
- Title(s) on the line: WBC super lightweight title

Tale of the tape
Boxer	Julio César Chávez	Meldrick Taylor
Nickname	El Gran Campeón Mexicano ("The Great Mexican Champion")	TNT
Hometown	Ciudad Obregón, Sonora, Mexico	Philadelphia, Pennsylvania, U.S.
Purse	$1,000,000	$400,000
Pre-fight record	90–1–1 (77 KO)	32–3–1 (18 KO)
Age	32 years, 2 months	27 years, 10 months
Height	5 ft 7 in (170 cm)	5 ft 6 1/2 in (169 cm)
Weight	140 lb (64 kg)	140 lb (64 kg)
Style	Orthodox	Orthodox
Recognition	WBC; Super Lightweight Champion; The Ring; No. 2 Ranked Light Welterweight; 3-division World Champion	WBC; No. 4 Ranked Welterweight; 2-division World Champion

Result
- Chavez wins via 8th round TKO

Julio César Chávez vs. Meldrick Taylor II, billed as Unfinished Business, was a professional boxing match contested on September 17, 1994, for the WBC super lightweight title.

== Background ==
On March 17, 1990, WBC super lightweight champion Julio César Chávez met IBF super lightweight champion Meldrick Taylor in a unification bout. In one of the most memorable and controversial fights of the 1990s, Chávez, trailing on the scorecards, would score a last-second knockout victory after referee Richard Steele stopped the fight despite Taylor having risen from the knockdown and there being only two seconds left in the fight. The IBF ordered a rematch between the two fighters just two weeks later on the basis that Steele failed to direct Chavez to a neutral corner when he began initiating his 10-count with IBF president Bob Lee stating "We are not saying he shouldn’t have stopped the fight. We think he did the right thing to protect the fighter, but if he stopped the count, who knows what might have happened?" To help facilitate the rematch, the IBF would rank Taylor as the number-one super lightweight thus making him Chávez's mandatory challenger and giving Chávez six months to face Taylor or be stripped of their title. In December 1990, promoter Don King announced that Chávez and Taylor would meet in rematch set for February 2, 1991, however Taylor's promoter Dan Duva denounced King's announcement stating "There is no Feb. 2 date. Never has been. Never will be." Instead Taylor would move up to the welterweight division to challenge WBA titlist Aaron Davis on January 19, defeating him by unanimous decision to become a 2-division world champion.

After over four years of waiting, King would announce in August 1994 that the long-awaited rematch between Chávez and Taylor would occur the following month on September 17. However, both Chávez and Taylor's reputation's had taken a hit; Chávez had lost his unbeaten streak earlier in the year, losing to Frankie Randall in January and then barely beating him in a rematch in May, while Taylor had been blown out in back-to-back world title matches in 1992 and had only faced marginal competition since, somewhat dulling the luster of the rematch. Though Taylor was only 27 at the time, he was considered a "shot" fighter and was installed as 3 1/2 underdog. Taylor would dismiss notions that he was past-his-prime stating "I've done everything I've had to do to prepare for this man." Chávez would retain top trainer Emanuel Steward, while Taylor would enlist Willie Rush, his trainer as an amateur and Philadelphia-based nutritionist Shiloh Bey, who helped Taylor lose 30 pounds to get down to the 140-pound super lightweight limit by implementing a natural food diet. Taylor claimed to be in "tip-top shape" and stated "I have my hand speed back, my power. I'm punching harder. I predict a knockout and not because I'm cocky or arrogant."

The Chávez–Taylor main event would be supplemented on the undercard with five additional world championship matches; Juan Martín Coggi vs. Frankie Randall for the WBA super lightweight title, Félix Trinidad vs. Yori Boy Campas for the IBF welterweight title, Gabriel Ruelas vs. Jesse James Leija for the WBC super featerhweight title, Vincent Pettway vs. Gianfranco Rosi and Ricardo López vs. Surachai Saengmorakot for the WBC mini flyweight title. The six world title fights set a record for most on a single boxing card.

== The fight ==
Taylor started the fight well, taking several of the early rounds, but Chávez would take control of the later rounds, with a low-blow costing Taylor one point on the scorecards in the sixth round. Midway through the eighth, Chávez would connect with a left hook that sent Taylor down on the seat of his pants. Dazed and bleeding from his mouth, Taylor answered referee Mills Lane's 10-count at eight and was allowed to continue the fight, but was quickly met with a bevy of punches to head from Chávez. As Taylor was not fighting back, Lane quickly stepped in and ended the fight just seconds later, giving Chávez the victory by technical knockout.

== Fight card ==
Confirmed bouts:

Weight Class	Weight		vs.		Method	Round	Notes
Super Lightweight	140 lbs.	Julio César Chávez (c)	def.	Meldrick Taylor	TKO	8/12	^{Note 1}
Super Lightweight	140 lbs.	Frankie Randall	def.	Juan Martín Coggi (c)	UD	12/12	^{Note 2}
Welterweight	147 lbs.	Félix Trinidad (c)	def.	Yori Boy Campas	TKO	4/12	^{Note 3}
Super Featherweight	130 lbs.	Gabriel Ruelas	def.	Jesse James Leija (c)	UD	12/12	^{Note 4}
Super Welterweight	154 lbs.	Vincent Pettway	def.	Gianfranco Rosi (c)	KO	4/12	^{Note 5}
Mini Flyweight	105 lbs.	Ricardo López (c)	def.	Surachai Saengmorakot	TKO	1/12	^{Note 6}
Super Lightweight	140 lbs.	Giovanni Parisi	def.	Freddie Pendleton	SD	10/10
Welterweight	147 lbs.	Michael Carruth	def.	Kim Jackson	TKO	4/6

^Note 1 For WBC Super Lightweight title
^Note 2 For WBA Super Lightweight title
^Note 3 For IBF Welterweight title
^Note 4 For WBC Super Featherweight title
^Note 5 For IBF Super Welterweight title
^Note 6 For WBC Mini Flyweight title

== Broadcasting ==
Country	Broadcaster
United States	Showtime

Preceded by vs. Frankie Randall II	Julio César Chávez's bouts 17 September 1994	Succeeded by vs. Tony Lopez
Preceded by vs. Chad Broussard	Meldrick Taylor's bouts 17 September 1994	Succeeded by vs. Kenneth Kidd
