= Vaden =

Vaden is both a given name and a surname.

Notable people with the given name include:

- Vaden Todd Lewis (born 1965), American singer

Notable people with the surname include:

- Paul Vaden (born 1967), American boxer
- Robert Vaden (born 1985), American basketball player
- Robert C. Vaden (1882–1954), American businessman and state senator
- Robert Vaden (basketball) (born 1985), American basketball player
- Sadler Vaden (born 1986), American guitarist, singer, songwriter and producer
- Stephen Vaden (born 1982), American judge

== See also ==
- Vaiden
