= Gianfranco Rosi (boxer) =

Italian boxer

Personal information
- Nationality: Italian
- Born: Gianfranco Rosi; 5 August 1957 (age 69) Assisi, Umbria, Italy
- Height: 5 ft 10 in (178 cm)
- Weight: Welterweight; Light middleweight; Middleweight

Boxing career
- Reach: 73 1/4 in (186 cm)
- Stance: Orthodox

Boxing record
- Total fights: 70
- Wins: 62
- Win by KO: 18
- Losses: 6
- Draws: 1
- No contests: 1

Gianfranco Rosi (born 5 August 1957) retired Italian boxer who was a two-time world champion in the light-middleweight division.

== Amateur career ==
Rosi had a record of 94 wins - 2 losses - 4 draws.

Highlights:

- 1976 Italian Light-Welterweight Champion
- 1977 Italian Welterweight Champion

== Professional career ==
Rosi turned pro in 1979 and won the WBC light-middleweight title in 1987 by decisioning Lupe Aquino. He lost the belt in 1988 when he was dominated by Donald Curry. Rosi was down once in 2nd, 4th and 8th and down twice in 7th, failing to answer the bell starting the 10th round.

In 1989 he won the IBF light-middleweight title by outpointing the undefeated Darrin Van Horn. He went on to successfully defend the title an impressive 11 times. In 1994 he had a technical draw against Vincent Pettway, and in the rematch later that year Pettway KO'd Rosi, ending his long reign.

In 1995 he took on WBO light-middleweight title holder Verno Phillips and won a decision, but Rosi failed a drug test and Phillips was reinstated as champion. The result of the bout was changed to a No Contest. In 1997 he lost a rematch to Phillips and retired.

In 2003 he came out of retirement, and finally retired in 2006 at the age of 49 with a pro record of 62 wins (18 KOs), 6 losses, and 1 draw.

== Professional boxing record ==
70 fights	62 wins	6 losses
By knockout	18	5
By decision	41	1
By disqualification	3	0
Draws	1	
No contests	1	

No.	Result	Record	Opponent	Type	Round, time	Date	Location	Notes
70	Loss	62–6–1 (1)	(France) Robert Roselia	KO	11 (12)	20 Oct 2006	Palasport, San Marino	For vacant IBF Inter-Continental Middleweight title
69	Win	62–5–1 (1)	(France) Christophe Karagoz	UD	12	29 Apr 2006	ZBC Gym, Budapest, Hungary	Retained IBF Mediterranean Middleweight title
68	Win	61–5–1 (1)	(France) Sylvain Gomis	UD	12	24 Jun 2005	Sporthall Lang, Budapest, Hungary	Retained IBF Mediterranean Middleweight title
67	Win	60–5–1 (1)	(Hungary) Peter Zsilak	TKO	6 (12)	22 Oct 2004	Belgrade, Serbia	Retained IBF Mediterranean Middleweight title
66	Win	59–5–1 (1)	(Romania) Mugurel Sebe	UD	8	14 Dec 2003	Rijeka, Croatia	Won vacant IBF Mediterranean middleweight titles
65	Loss	58–5–1 (1)	(Belize) Verno Phillips	MD	12	21 May 1997	(United Kingdom) Moat House Hotel, Liverpool, U.K.	For vacant WBU light middleweight title
64	Win	58–4–1 (1)	(Bulgaria) Milko Stoikov	PTS	8	29 Jun 1996	Banja Vrujci, Serbia	
63	NC	57–4–1 (1)	(Belize) Verno Phillips	UD	12	17 May 1995	Palazzetto dello Sport, Perugia, Italy	WBO light-middleweight title at stake; originally a UD win for Rosi, later overturned after Rosi failed a drugs test
62	Loss	57–4–1	(United States) Vincent Pettway	KO	4 (12)	17 Sep 1994	(United States) MGM Grand Garden Arena, Paradise, Nevada, U.S.	Lost IBF light-middleweight title
61	Draw	57–3–1	(United States) Vincent Pettway	TD	6 (12)	4 Mar 1994	(United States) MGM Grand Garden Arena, Paradise, Nevada, U.S.	Retained IBF light-middleweight title
60	Win	57–3	(France) Gilbert Delé	SD	12	20 Jan 1993	Avoriaz, France	Retained IBF light-middleweight title
59	Win	56–3	(France) Gilbert Delé	SD	12	11 Jul 1992	Stade Louis II, Fontvieille, Monaco	Retained IBF light-middleweight title
58	Win	55–3	(Spain) Angel Hernandez	TKO	6 (12)	9 Apr 1992	Palazzetto dello Sport, Celano, Italy	Retained IBF light-middleweight title
57	Win	54–3	(Mexico) Alfredo Ramirez	PTS	10	29 Jan 1992	Salemo, Italy	
56	Win	53–3	(United States) Gilbert Baptist	UD	12	21 Nov 1991	Palazzo Dello Sport, Perugia, Italy	Retained IBF light-middleweight title
55	Win	52–3	(United States) Glenn Wolfe	UD	12	13 Jul 1991	Main City Square, Avezzano, Italy	Retained IBF light-middleweight title
54	Win	51–3	(United States) Ronald Amundsen	UD	12	16 Mar 1991	Palasport, Saint-Vincent, Italy	Retained IBF light-middleweight title
53	Win	50–3	(France) René Jacquot	UD	12	30 Nov 1990	Palais de Sports, Marsala, Italy	Retained IBF light-middleweight title
52	Win	49–3	(United States) Darrin Van Horn	UD	12	21 Jul 1990	Palazzo del Ghiaccio, Marino, Italy	Retained IBF light-middleweight title
51	Win	48–3	(United States) Kevin Daigle	TKO	7 (12)	14 Apr 1990	Loew's Hotel, Monte Carlo, Monaco	Retained IBF light-middleweight title
50	Win	47–3	(Australia) Troy Waters	UD	12	27 Oct 1989	Palasport, Saint-Vincent, Italy	Retained IBF light-middleweight title
49	Win	46–3	(United States) Darrin Van Horn	UD	12	15 Jul 1989	(United States) Trump Castle, Atlantic City, New Jersey, U.S.	Won IBF light-middleweight title
48	Win	45–3	(United States) Jake Torrance	PTS	8	22 Apr 1989	Perugia, Italy	
47	Win	44–3	(United States) Darryl Anthony	TKO	2 (8)	15 Feb 1989	Vibo Valentia, Italy	
46	Loss	43–3	(United States) Donald Curry	RTD	9 (12)	8 Jul 1988	Portosole, San Remo, Italy	Lost WBC light-middleweight title
45	Win	43–2	(United States) Duane Thomas	TKO	7 (12)	3 Jan 1988	Palazzo Dello Sport, Genoa, Italy	Retained WBC light-middleweight title
44	Win	42–2	(Mexico) Lupe Aquino	UD	12	2 Oct 1987	Palazzo Dello Sport, Perugia, Italy	Won WBC light-middleweight title
43	Win	41–2	(France) Marc Ruocco	DQ	5 (12)	27 Jun 1987	Palais des Festivals, Cannes, France	Retained European super welterweight title
42	Win	40–2	(Spain) Emilio Sole	KO	2 (12)	6 May 1987	Lucca, Italy	Retained European super welterweight title
41	Win	39–2	(United Kingdom) Chris Pyatt	UD	12	28 Jan 1987	Palazzo Dello Sport, Perugia, Italy	Won European super welterweight title
40	Win	38–2	(Dominican Republic) Joaquin Velasquez	PTS	8	20 Jun 1986	Rio Secco, Italy	
39	Win	37–2	(France) Jean-Marie Touati	PTS	10	16 May 1986	Gymnase Principiano, Le Cannet, France	
38	Win	36–2	(Zaire) Lomami Wa Lomami	PTS	8	28 Dec 1985	Terni, Italy	
37	Win	35–2	(Italy) Gaetano Caso	KO	8 (12)	23 Nov 1985	Viterbo, Italy	Won Italian Welterweight Title
36	Win	34–2	(Italy) Domenico Ricci	KO	3 (8)	11 Oct 1985	Perugia, Italy	
35	Win	33–2	(Zaire) Inino Wa Bolamba	PTS	8	15 Jun 1985	Spoleto, Italy	
34	Loss	32–2	(United Kingdom) Lloyd Honeyghan	KO	3 (12)	5 Jan 1985	Palazzetto dello Sport, Perugia, Italy	Lost European Welterweight Title
33	Win	32–1	(Colombia) Martin Rojas	PTS	10	17 Nov 1984	Riva del Garda, Italy	
32	Win	31–1	(Spain) Perico Fernández	UD	12	7 Jul 1984	Perugia, Italy	Won vacant European welterweight title
31	Win	30–1	(France) Yvon Segor	PTS	8	18 May 1984	Palais des sports, Cannes, France	
30	Win	29–1	(United States) Johnny McClain	KO	7 (8)	31 Mar 1984	Spoleto, Italy	
29	Win	28–1	(Dominican Republic) Dario De Jesus	PTS	8	3 Mar 1984	Palazzo dei Congressi, Riva del Garda, Italy	
28	Win	27–1	(United States) Mike Essett	DQ	4 (8)	12 Nov 1983	Discoteca Ellera, Perugia, Italy	
27	Win	26–1	(Italy) Francesco Gallo	TKO	8 (12)	30 Sep 1983	Modena, Italy	Retained Italian Welterweight Title
26	Win	25–1	(Italy) Luciano Navarra	PTS	8	1 Jul 1983	Vibo Valentia, Italy	
25	Win	24–1	(Italy) Pierangelo Pira	TKO	5 (12)	22 Apr 1983	Perugia, Italy	Retained Italian Welterweight Title
24	Win	23–1	(Zaire) Mosimo Maeleke	PTS	8	11 Feb 1983	Perugia, Italy	
23	Win	22–1	(Brazil) Everaldo Costa Azevedo	TKO	7 (12)	15 Oct 1982	Perugia, Italy	Retained Italian Welterweight Title
22	Win	21–1	(Italy) Antonio Antino	PTS	8	16 Sep 1982	Perugia, Italy	
21	Win	20–1	(Italy) Antonio Torsello	TKO	2 (12)	15 Aug 1982	Alberobello, Italy	Retained Italian Welterweight Title
20	Win	19–1	(Zaire) Mosimo Maeleke	PTS	8	17 Jul 1982	Assisi, Italy	
19	Win	18–1	(Zaire) Mosimo Maeleke	PTS	8	12 Jun 1982	Todi, Italy	
18	Win	17–1	(Italy) Giuseppe Di Padova	RTD	7 (12)	16 Apr 1982	Perugia, Italy	Won Italian Welterweight Title
17	Win	16–1	(El Salvador) Oscar Aparicio	PTS	8	4 Dec 1981	Perugia, Italy	
16	Win	15–1	(Tunisia) Bechir Jelassi	PTS	8	13 Nov 1981	Rome, Italy	
15	Win	14–1	(Italy) Antonio Torsello	TKO	2 (8)	11 Sep 1981	Perugia, Italy	
14	Win	13–1	(Brazil) Claudio Pereira	PTS	8	12 Jul 1981	Assisi, Italy	
13	Win	12–1	(Italy) Piero Spadaccini	PTS	6	23 May 1981	Palazzetto dello Sport, Perugia, Italy	
12	Win	11–1	(Brazil) Claudio Pereira	PTS	10	10 Apr 1981	Palazzetto dello Sport, Perugia, Italy	
11	Win	10–1	(Italy) Francesco Gallo	PTS	8	7 Mar 1981	Perugia, Italy	
10	Win	9–1	(Italy) Filiberto Zaccheo	TKO	1 (8)	17 Dec 1980	Senigallia, Italy	
9	Win	8–1	(Italy) Ernesto Ros	PTS	8	29 Nov 1980	Spoleto, Italy	
8	Win	7–1	(Brazil) Mauro Fernandes da Cruz	PTS	8	14 Sep 1980	Ellera, Italy	
7	Win	6–1	(Brazil) Jose Luis Ribeiro	DQ	2 (8)	27 Aug 1980	Senigallia, Italy	
6	Loss	5–1	(Brazil) Nelson Gomes	TKO	7 (8)	31 May 1980	Spoleto, Italy	
5	Win	5–0	(France) Patrick Babouram	PTS	6	8 Mar 1980	Spoleto, Italy	
4	Win	4–0	(Serbia) Zdravko Jovicic	TKO	1 (6)	29 Dec 1979	Perugia, Italy	
3	Win	3–0	(France) Maurice Renaud	PTS	6	24 Nov 1979	Marsciano, Italy	
2	Win	2–0	(Italy) Scipione Colaianni	TKO	2 (6)	19 Oct 1979	Perugia, Italy	
1	Win	1–0	(Italy) Francesco Sanna	PTS	6	10 Sep 1979	Perugia, Italy	Professional Debut

== See also ==
- List of world light-middleweight boxing champions

Sporting positions
Regional boxing titles
Vacant Title last held by Gilles Elbilia	EBU welterweight champion 7 July 1984 – 5 January 1985	Succeeded by Lloyd Honeyghan
Preceded by Chris Pyatt	EBU light middleweight champion 28 January – 2 October 1987; Vacated	Vacant Title next held by René Jacquot
New title	IBF Mediterranean middleweight champion 14 December 2003 – 20 October 2006; Failed to win Inter-Continental title	Vacant Title next held by Gaetano Nespro
World boxing titles
Preceded by Lupe Aquino	WBC light middleweight champion 2 October 1987 – 8 July 1988	Succeeded by Donald Curry
Preceded by Darrin Van Horn	IBF light middleweight champion 15 July 1989 – 17 September 1994	Succeeded by Vincent Pettway
