= Duane Thomas (boxer) =

American boxer (1961–2000)

Personal information
- Born: February 1, 1961 Detroit, Michigan, U.S.
- Died: June 13, 2000 (aged 39) Detroit, Michigan, U.S.
- Height: 5 ft 9 1/2 in (177 cm)
- Weight: Light middleweight

Boxing career
- Stance: Orthodox

Boxing record
- Total fights: 34
- Wins: 31
- Win by KO: 21
- Losses: 3

Duane Thomas (February 1, 1961 – June 2000) was an American professional boxer in the super welterweight (154 lb) division. He was born in Detroit, Michigan.

== Professional career ==
Thomas turned pro in 1979 and won the Vacant USBA Light middleweight title in 1983 against Nino Gonzalez. He would go on to win the WBC Light Middleweight Title with a 3rd-round TKO over John Mugabi in 1986 at Caesars Palace in Las Vegas. Thomas would lose the title eight months later, in Merignac, France, in his first defense to Lupe Aquino by decision. In 1988 he challenged WBC Light Middleweight Title holder Gianfranco Rosi, but was dominated and TKO'd in the 7th. He was an elite fighter during his era.

== Professional boxing record ==
34 fights	31 wins	3 losses
By knockout	21	2
By decision	9	1
By disqualification	1	0

No.	Result	Record	Opponent	Type	Round, time	Date	Location	Notes
34	Win	31–3	Abraham Bruno	UD	6 (6)	2000-04-08	Joe Louis Arena, Detroit, Michigan, U.S.	
33	Win	30–3	Thomas Covington	UD	8 (8)	1989-10-13	Manuel Lujan Exhibition Hall at Expo, Albuquerque, New Mexico, U.S.	
32	Loss	29–3	Gianfranco Rosi	TKO	7 (12)	1988-01-03	Palazzo Dello Sport, Genoa, Italy	For WBC super welterweight title
31	Loss	29–2	Lupe Aquino	UD	12 (12)	1987-07-12	Sports Complex, Mérignac, France	Lost WBC super welterweight title
30	Win	29–1	John Mugabi	TKO	3 (12)	1986-12-05	Caesars Palace, Paradise, Nevada, U.S.	Won vacant WBC super welterweight title
29	Win	28–1	Bobby McCorvey	TKO	2 (10)	1986-10-17	Cobo Arena, Detroit, Michigan, U.S.	
28	Win	27–1	Tony Ojo	TKO	2 (12)	1986-07-28	Grahams Studio West, Phoenix, Arizona, U.S.	Retained USBA super welterweight title
27	Win	26–1	Lopez McGee	UD	10 (10)	1986-01-07	New Daisy Theatre, Memphis, Tennessee, U.S.	
26	Win	25–1	Mark McPherson	TKO	10 (12)	1985-05-16	Resorts International, Atlantic City, New Jersey, U.S.	Retained USBA super welterweight title
25	Win	24–1	Sumbu Kalambay	PTS	10 (10)	1985-04-06	Bally's, Atlantic City, New Jersey, U.S.	
24	Win	23–1	Lloyd Richardson	TKO	1 (10)	1984-12-20	Bismarck Hotel, Chicago, Illinois, U.S.	
23	Win	22–1	Tony Harrison	TKO	8 (10)	1984-06-15	Caesars Palace, Paradise, Nevada, U.S.	
22	Win	21–1	Clayton Hires	KO	4 (12)	1984-04-19	Cobo Arena, Detroit, Michigan, U.S.	Retained USBA super welterweight title
21	Win	20–1	Donald King	TKO	10 (12)	1983-11-19	Showboat Hotel and Casino, Las Vegas, Nevada, U.S.	Retained USBA super welterweight title
20	Win	19–1	Nino Gonzalez	TKO	8 (12)	1983-05-26	Sands Casino Hotel, Atlantic City, New Jersey, U.S.	Won vacant USBA super welterweight title
19	Win	18–1	Jesse Abrams	KO	2 (10)	1982-09-04	Cobo Arena, Detroit, Michigan, U.S.	
18	Win	17–1	Willie Ray Taylor	KO	4 (10)	1982-07-25	Cobo Arena, Detroit, Michigan, U.S.	
17	Loss	16–1	Buster Drayton	TKO	7 (10)	1982-04-29	Sands Casino Hotel, Atlantic City, New Jersey, U.S.	
16	Win	16–0	Tony McMinn	TKO	1 (10)	1982-02-27	The Aladdin, Paradise, Nevada, U.S.	
15	Win	15–0	Fred Reed	TKO	2 (?)	1982-01-23	Cobo Arena, Detroit, Michigan, U.S.	
14	Win	14–0	Carl Crowley	KO	1 (10)	1981-12-03	Coliseum, Jackson, Tennessee, U.S.	
13	Win	13–0	Jose Luis Santana	TKO	10 (10)	1981-09-10	Twenty Grand Showroom, Detroit, Detroit, Michigan, U.S.	
12	Win	12–0	David Braxton	SD	10 (10)	1981-02-19	Cobo Arena, Detroit, Michigan, U.S.	
11	Win	11–0	Jerry Hall	DQ	1 (10)	1980-12-12	Cobo Arena, Detroit, Michigan, U.S.	
10	Win	10–0	Allen Avery	KO	2 (6)	1980-12-02	Sports Arena, Toledo, Ohio, U.S.	
9	Win	9–0	Randall Jackson	KO	1 (8)	1980-10-23	Cobo Arena, Detroit, Michigan, U.S.	
8	Win	8–0	James Leftwick	KO	1 (?)	1980-06-13	Detroit, Michigan, U.S.	
7	Win	7–0	Lamont Hopkins	TKO	3 (6)	1980-02-22	Joe Louis Arena, Detroit, Michigan, U.S.	
6	Win	6–0	Lenny Villers	UD	6 (6)	1980-01-24	Joe Louis Arena, Detroit, Michigan, U.S.	
5	Win	5–0	Rodney Cummings	UD	6 (6)	1979-11-15	Cobo Arena, Detroit, Michigan, U.S.	
4	Win	4–0	Harvey Wilson	KO	2 (6)	1979-10-18	Olympia Stadium, Detroit, Michigan, U.S.	
3	Win	3–0	Dave Myrick	UD	4 (4)	1979-08-02	Olympia Stadium, Detroit, Michigan, U.S.	
2	Win	2–0	Ron Tillman	TKO	4 (4)	1979-06-28	Olympia Stadium, Detroit, Michigan, U.S.	
1	Win	1–0	Ken Rocky Fusco	SD	4 (4)	1979-04-20	Felt Forum, New York City, New York, U.S.	

== Death ==
Duane Thomas had just made a comeback after 11 years out of the ring, when he was murdered in Detroit over a drug dispute, in 2000.

== See also ==
- List of world light-middleweight boxing champions
- List of homicides in Michigan

Sporting positions
Regional boxing titles
Vacant Title last held by Gary Guiden	USBA super welterweight champion May 26, 1983 – 1986; Vacated	Vacant Title next held by Donald Curry
World boxing titles
Vacant Title last held by Thomas Hearns	WBC super welterweight champion December 5, 1986 – July 12, 1987	Succeeded by Lupe Aquino
