= Gilbert Delé =

French boxer

Personal information
- Nationality: French
- Born: January 1, 1964 (age 62) Lamentin, Guadeloupe
- Height: 5 ft 9 1/2 in (177 cm)
- Weight: Light middleweight

Boxing career
- Stance: Orthodox

Boxing record
- Total fights: 38
- Wins: 34
- Win by KO: 23
- Losses: 3
- Draws: 1

Gilbert Delé (born 1 January 1964) is a French former professional boxer who competed from 1986 to 1993. He held the WBA light-middleweight title in 1991 and challenged twice for the IBF light-middleweight title in 1992 and 1993. At regional level he held the European light-middleweight title from 1989 to 1990.

== Career ==
Delé turned pro in 1986, and captured the vacant WBA light middleweight title in 1991 with a technical knockout over Carlos Elliott. He defended the belt once before losing it to Vinny Pazienza later that year. He retired in 1993 after unsuccessfully challenging IBF light-middleweight title holder Gianfranco Rosi twice.

== Professional boxing record ==
| 38 fights | 34 wins | 3 losses |
|---|---|---|
| By knockout | 23 | 1 |
| By decision | 11 | 2 |
| Draws | 1 | |

| No. | Result | Record | Opponent | Type | Round, time | Date | Location | Notes |
|---|---|---|---|---|---|---|---|---|
| 38 | Loss | 34–3–1 | Gianfranco Rosi | SD | 12 (12) | 1993-01-20 | Avoriaz, France | For IBF super welterweight title |
| 37 | Loss | 34–2–1 | Gianfranco Rosi | SD | 12 (12) | 1992-07-11 | Stade Louis II, Fontvieille, Monaco | For IBF super welterweight title |
| 36 | Win | 34–1–1 | Eric Rhinehart | KO | 4 (?) | 1992-05-21 | Cirque d'hiver, Paris, France | |
| 35 | Win | 33–1–1 | Johnny Gutierrez | TKO | 10 (10) | 1992-04-04 | Levallois-Perret, France | |
| 34 | Win | 32–1–1 | Alfredo Ramirez | TKO | 8 (8) | 1992-02-23 | Reims, France | |
| 33 | Win | 31–1–1 | Lemark Davis | PTS | 8 (8) | 1992-02-09 | Le Mans, France | |
| 32 | Win | 30–1–1 | Rocky Berg | TKO | 1 (?) | 1991-12-13 | Palais Omnisport de Paris-Bercy, Paris, France | |
| 31 | Loss | 29–1–1 | Vinny Paz | TKO | 12 (12) | 1991-10-01 | Civic Center, Providence, Rhode Island, U.S. | Lost WBA super welterweight title |
| 30 | Win | 29–0–1 | Shannon Landberg | TKO | 6 (?) | 1991-08-14 | La Seyne-sur-Mer, France | |
| 29 | Win | 28–0–1 | Jun Suk Hwang | UD | 12 (12) | 1991-05-04 | Halle Georges Carpentier, Paris, France | Retained WBA super welterweight title |
| 28 | Win | 27–0–1 | Carlos Elliott | TKO | 7 (12) | 1991-02-23 | Stade du Futbol, Pointe-à-Pitre, Guadeloupe | Won vacant WBA super welterweight title |
| 27 | Win | 26–0–1 | Nino Cirilo | KO | 3 (?) | 1991-01-13 | Saint-Maur, France | |
| 26 | Win | 25–0–1 | Orlando Orozco | PTS | 8 (8) | 1990-12-15 | Salle des Étoiles, Monte Carlo, Monaco | |
| 25 | Win | 24–0–1 | Dave Wyatt Jr | KO | 1 (8) | 1990-08-17 | Palais des Congrès Acropolis, Nice, France | |
| 24 | Win | 23–0–1 | Giovanni De Marco | SD | 12 (12) | 1990-05-26 | Caserta, Italy | Retained EBU super welterweight title |
| 23 | Win | 22–0–1 | Terry Magee | TKO | 3 (12) | 1990-03-26 | Nogent-sur-Marne, France | Retained EBU super welterweight title |
| 22 | Win | 21–0–1 | Lorenzo Garcia | PTS | 10 (10) | 1990-01-29 | Pavillon Baltard, Nogent-sur-Marne, France | |
| 21 | Win | 20–0–1 | Giuseppe Leto | TKO | 1 (12) | 1989-12-20 | Palermo, Italy | Won EBU super welterweight title |
| 20 | Win | 19–0–1 | Dexter Smith | PTS | 8 (8) | 1989-09-25 | Nogent-sur-Marne, France | |
| 19 | Win | 18–0–1 | Jake Torrance | UD | 8 (8) | 1989-07-08 | Mirapolis, Cergy-Pontoise, France | |
| 18 | Win | 17–0–1 | Martin Camara | TKO | 4 (10) | 1989-04-22 | Gamaches, France | Retained French super welterweight title |
| 17 | Win | 16–0–1 | Kitenge Wa Kitenge | TKO | 6 (?) | 1989-03-20 | Pavillon Baltard, Nogent-sur-Marne, France | |
| 16 | Win | 15–0–1 | Mario Lavouiray | TKO | 6 (?) | 1989-03-04 | Strasbourg, France | |
| 15 | Win | 14–0–1 | Ian Chantler | TKO | 3 (8) | 1989-01-09 | Pavillon Baltard, Nogent-sur-Marne, France | |
| 14 | Win | 13–0–1 | Jean-Marie Touati | TKO | 6 (10) | 1988-11-10 | Saint-Quentin, France | Retained French super welterweight title |
| 13 | Win | 12–0–1 | Roman Nunez | TKO | 5 (?) | 1988-10-10 | Nogent-sur-Marne, France | |
| 12 | Win | 11–0–1 | Lester Yarbrough | TKO | 5 (?) | 1988-06-26 | Compiègne, France | |
| 11 | Win | 10–0–1 | Martin Camara | TKO | 8 (10) | 1988-06-10 | Parc des Sports, Annecy, France | Retained French super welterweight title |
| 10 | Win | 9–0–1 | Jean Paul Roux | TKO | 2 (10) | 1988-04-02 | Saint-Quentin, France | Won vacant French super welterweight title |
| 9 | Win | 8–0–1 | Marc Ruocco | PTS | 10 (10) | 1988-02-05 | Toulon, France | |
| 8 | Win | 7–0–1 | Eric Taton | KO | 3 (?) | 1987-12-19 | Reims, France | |
| 7 | Win | 6–0–1 | Jean Paul Roux | TKO | 7 (?) | 1987-11-14 | Saint-Quentin, France | |
| 6 | Win | 5–0–1 | Ouarid Benramdane | TKO | 3 (?) | 1987-05-16 | Complexe Sportif René Tys, Reims, France | |
| 5 | Win | 4–0–1 | Jean Marc Mauny | PTS | 6 (6) | 1987-04-11 | Chinon, France | |
| 4 | Win | 3–0–1 | Antoine Alcantara | PTS | 6 (6) | 1987-03-21 | Epernay, France | |
| 3 | Win | 2–0–1 | Khamel Ghezal | TKO | 3 (6) | 1987-01-30 | Salle du cours, Grasse, France | |
| 2 | Draw | 1–0–1 | Romeo Kensmil | PTS | 6 (6) | 1986-11-17 | Sporthal De Houtzagerij, Den Haag, Netherlands | |
| 1 | Win | 1–0 | Rexford Kortram | PTS | 6 (6) | 1986-10-13 | Margriethal, Schiedam, Netherlands | |

== See also ==
- List of world light-middleweight boxing champions

Sporting positions
Regional boxing titles
| Preceded by Giuseppe Leto | EBU super welterweight champion 20 December 1989 – 1991; Vacated | Vacant Title next held by Said Skouma |
World boxing titles
| Vacant Title last held by Julian Jackson | WBA light-middleweight champion 23 February 1991 – 1 October 1991 | Succeeded by Vinny Paz |
