= Jorge Castro (boxer) =

Argentine boxer (1967–2026)

- Castro in 2018

Personal information
- Nicknames: Locomotora ("Locomotor"); El Roña ("The Quarrel" in Argentine slang)
- Born: Jorge Fernando Castro; 18 August 1967 Caleta Olivia, Santa Cruz Province, Argentina
- Died: 14 October 2026 (aged 59) Morón, Buenos Aires Province, Argentina
- Height: 5 ft 9 in (175 cm)
- Weight: Light middleweight; Middleweight; Light heavyweight; Cruiserweight

Boxing career
- Reach: 69 in (175 cm)
- Stance: Orthodox

Boxing record
- Total fights: 144
- Wins: 130
- Win by KO: 90
- Losses: 11
- Draws: 3

Jorge Fernando Castro (18 August 1967 – 14 October 2026) was an Argentine professional boxer who competed from 1987 to 2007. He held the World Boxing Association (WBA) middleweight title from 1994 to 1995. Castro is best known for his second defense of the title against John David Jackson in 1994, which was awarded Fight of the Year by The Ring.

== Early years ==
Castro, who in 1985 was set to become a professional boxer but suffered a bicycle accident that left him injured so badly that doctors told him he'd never be able to fight as a professional, recuperated from the accident and turned professional, defying the doctor's prognosis, in 1987.

== Professional career ==
In December 1991, at Palais Omnisports, Bercy, France, Castro lost to Terry Norris by a wide unanimous decision in a challenge for the WBC super welterweight title. It was reported that prior to the bout, Castro had done roadwork for the first time in his life.

In June 1992, at the Civic Center in Pensacola, Florida, United States, Castro lost a wide decision over ten rounds to future pound for pound king Roy Jones Jr.

Castro became a world champion in 1994 by defeating Reggie Johnson in Buenos Aires by split decision to win the vacant WBA middleweight title. After defeating Alex Ramos by a knockout in two rounds to retain the belt, he travelled to Monterrey, Mexico, to defend against the former undefeated holder of the WBA title John David Jackson in December 1994.

What began merely as an undercard world title fight in a pay-per-view program featuring Félix Trinidad vs Oba Carr and Julio César Chávez vs Tony Lopez, soon became a fight that is part of boxing's lore. Castro was trailing badly on all three scorecards, with one eye closed and the other one only halfway opened, bleeding and taking combination after combination against the ropes. Seemingly on the verge of being stopped, Castro landed a left hook to Jackson's chin and Jackson hit the floor. Jackson got up, but he suffered two more knockdowns and Castro completed what could be said that was one of the greatest turnarounds ever in a boxing fight, retaining the title by a knockout in the ninth round.

At the press conference after the fight, Castro called his winning punch La mano de Dios, (The hand of God), in reference to the Hand of God goal by Diego Maradona during a win by Argentina national football team at the 1986 FIFA World Cup, which, like the fight, had taken place in Mexico. Therefore, that moment became known as boxing's version of The hand of God. The fight, and its ending, were talked about for months in many boxing magazines and books.

He defended his title another two times, including a rematch win over Reggie Johnson, and then he lost the title to Shinji Takehara by a decision in twelve. He split two 10-round decisions with Roberto Durán, winning the first in Argentina, but losing the rematch in Panama, and then he gave Jackson a rematch, this time winning by a decision in ten.

Castro lost two more world championship fights: in December 2000, he went to Germany and lost by a knockout in 10 to WBC cruiserweight champion Juan Carlos Gómez, and in February 2002, he went to Phoenix and challenged IBF cruiserweight champion Vassiliy Jirov, a Kazakhstan native who lives in Phoenix, losing by a decision in twelve. Despite his failures in these attempts to become a world champion again, he did not announce a retirement until 2013.

On 18 June 2005, Castro suffered a car accident in Buenos Aires, with a collapsed lung and some broken ribs. The accident and its consequences were similar to the one suffered by archrival Duran in Buenos Aires a few years before. Castro required hospitalization and emergency surgery, and was in stable condition after the surgery. He recuperated from his injuries.

On 22 April 2006, Castro fought Jose Luis Herrera, losing by a fourth-round knockout. He had his "revenge" against the same opponent on 27 January 2007, when Castro won by technical K.O. in the second round.

He had a record of 130 wins, 11 losses and 3 draws, with 89 knockout wins, which ranks him among the most prolific knockout winners in boxing history according to the records of Ring Magazine.

== Personal life and death ==
On 13 May 2007, Locomotora Castro joined the reality TV show Gran Hermano Famosos (Big Brother), along with 13 other celebrities from Argentina. The show was aired on Telefe Channel. Castro was the 8th eliminated, after staying in the house 58 days. He was a contestant in Bailando 2011, but he and his partner, Sofía Macaggi, were the second couple eliminated.

Jorge Castro died on 14 October 2026, while in a bingo hall, at the age of 59, apparently from a hypoglycemic crisis.

== Professional boxing record ==
144 fights	130 wins	11 losses
By knockout	90	2
By decision	40	9
Draws	3	

No.	Result	Record	Opponent	Type	Round, time	Date	Location	Notes
144	Win	130–11–3	Jose Luis Herrera	TKO	2 (10), 2:28	27 Jan 2007	Mar del Plata, Buenos Aires, Argentina	
143	Loss	129–11–3	Jose Luis Herrera	TKO	4 (10), 0:37	22 Apr 2006	Buenos Aires, Argentina	
142	Win	129–10–3	Derrick Harmon	TKO	7 (12), 2:35	26 May 2005	Buenos Aires, Argentina	Retained WBA Fedelatin light heavyweight title
141	Win	128–10–3	Peter Venancio	UD	10	28 Jan 2005	Río Gallegos, Santa Cruz, Argentina	Won WBA Fedelatin light heavyweight title
140	Win	127–10–3	Miguel Aguirre	UD	12	10 Jul 2004	Merlo, Buenos Aires, Argentina	Retained South American cruiserweight title
139	Win	126–10–3	Aaron Orlando Soria	RTD	7 (10), 0:01	1 May 2004	Ituzaingó, Buenos Aires, Argentina	
138	Win	125–10–3	Arturo Rivera	TKO	2 (10)	21 Feb 2004	Rosario, Santa Fe, Argentina	
137	Win	124–10–3	Miguel Aguirre	DQ	5 (12)	20 Dec 2003	Buenos Aires, Argentina	Won South American cruiserweight title
136	Win	123–10–3	Livin Castillo	KO	4 (10)	25 Oct 2003	Corrientes, Argentina	
135	Loss	122–10–3	Sebastiaan Rothmann	UD	12	12 Jul 2003	Brakpan, Gauteng, South Africa	For IBO cruiserweight title
134	Loss	122–9–3	Paul Briggs	UD	10	13 Apr 2003	Carrara, Queensland, Australia	
133	Win	122–8–3	Miguel Angel Robledo	KO	9 (10)	13 Dec 2002	Caleta Olivia, Santa Cruz, Argentina	
132	Win	121–8–3	Etianne Whitaker	UD	10	15 Nov 2002	Cordoba, Argentina	
131	Win	120–8–3	Sergio Martin Beaz	RTD	7 (10), 3:00	24 Aug 2002	Buenos Aires, Argentina	
130	Loss	119–8–3	Vassiliy Jirov	UD	12	1 Feb 2002	Phoenix, Arizona, United States	For IBF cruiserweight title
129	Win	119–7–3	Imamu Mayfield	RTD	9 (10), 3:00	20 Oct 2001	Buenos Aires, Argentina	
128	Win	118–7–3	Peter Venancio	KO	8 (10), 1:55	25 Aug 2001	Buenos Aires, Argentina	
127	Win	117–7–3	Peter Venancio	UD	10	7 Apr 2001	Bahía Blanca, Buenos Aires, Argentina	
126	Win	116–7–3	Roberto Coelho	TKO	6 (10)	10 Feb 2001	Necochea, Buenos Aires, Argentina	
125	Loss	115–7–3	Juan Carlos Gómez	TKO	10 (12), 1:56	16 Dec 2000	Essen, North Rhine-Westphalia, Germany	For WBC cruiserweight title
124	Win	115–6–3	Fabian Alberto Chancalay	KO	7 (10)	28 Oct 2000	San Justo, Buenos Aires, Argentina	
123	Win	114–6–3	Marco Antonio Duarte	TKO	4 (10)	18 Aug 2000	San Carlos de Bariloche, Río Negro, Argentina	
122	Win	113–6–3	Bruno Ruben Godoy	RTD	5 (10), 3:00	8 Jul 2000	Neuquén, Argentina	
121	Win	112–6–3	Oscar Angel Gomez	KO	7 (10)	13 May 2000	Río Gallegos, Santa Cruz, Argentina	
120	Win	111–6–3	Juan Carlos Giménez Ferreyra	UD	10	11 Sep 1999	Olavarría, Buenos Aires, Argentina	
119	Win	110–6–3	Marco Antonio Duarte	UD	10	23 Jul 1999	Ciudad Evita, Buenos Aires, Argentina	
118	Win	109–6–3	Miguel Angel Robledo	KO	5 (10)	15 May 1999	Berazategui, Buenos Aires, Argentina	
117	Draw	108–6–3	Miguel Angel Robledo	PTS	10	6 Mar 1999	Mar del Plata, Buenos Aires, Argentina	
116	Win	108–6–2	Miguel Angel Robledo	UD	10	10 Oct 1998	Río Grande, Tierra del Fuego, Argentina	
115	Win	107–6–2	Sandro Abel Vazquez	KO	4 (12)	5 Sep 1998	Santa Fe, Argentina	Retained WBA Fedelatin super middleweight title
114	Win	106–6–2	Armando Grueso	KO	2 (10)	25 Apr 1998	Buenos Aires, Argentina	
113	Win	105–6–2	John David Jackson	UD	10	20 Feb 1998	Cipoletti, Río Negro, Argentina	Retained WBA Fedelatin super middleweight title
112	Win	104–6–2	Rogério Lobo	KO	3 (12)	23 Jan 1998	San Bernardo, Buenos Aires, Argentina	Won WBA Fedelatin super middleweight title
111	Win	103–6–2	Adolfo Caballero	KO	1 (10)	29 Nov 1997	Ituzaingó, Buenos Aires, Argentina	
110	Win	102–6–2	Nicasio Moray Martinez	TKO	4 (10)	18 Oct 1997	Cipoletti, Río Negro, Argentina	
109	Loss	101–6–2	Roberto Durán	UD	10	14 Jun 1997	Panama City, Panama	
108	Win	101–5–2	Roberto Durán	UD	10	15 Feb 1997	Mar del Plata, Buenos Aires, Argentina	
107	Win	100–5–2	Nicasio Moray Martinez	KO	4 (10)	6 Jul 1996	Comodoro Rivadavia, Chubut, Argentina	
106	Win	99–5–2	Sergio Medina	TKO	1 (10)	12 Apr 1996	Cupecoy Bay, Sint Maarten, Netherlands Antilles	
105	Loss	98–5–2	Shinji Takehara	UD	12	19 Dec 1995	Tokyo, Japan	Lost WBA middleweight title
104	Win	98–4–2	Reggie Johnson	SD	12	13 Oct 1995	Comodoro Rivadavia, Chubut, Argentina	Retained WBA middleweight title
103	Win	97–4–2	Anthony Andrews	TKO	12 (12), 2:14	27 May 1995	Fort Lauderdale, Florida, United States	Retained WBA middleweight title
102	Win	96–4–2	John David Jackson	TKO	9 (12), 2:43	10 Dec 1994	Monterrey, Nuevo León, Mexico	Retained WBA middleweight title
101	Win	95–4–2	Alex Ramos	KO	2 (12), 1:13	5 Nov 1994	Caleta Olivia, Santa Cruz, Argentina	Retained WBA middleweight title
100	Win	94–4–2	Reggie Johnson	SD	12	12 Aug 1994	San Miguel, Tucumán, Argentina	Won vacant WBA middleweight title
99	Win	93–4–2	Royan Hammond	KO	4 (10)	17 Jul 1994	Buenos Aires, Argentina	
98	Win	92–4–2	Francisco Bernabe Bobadilla	PTS	10	8 Jul 1994	Comodoro Rivadavia, Chubut, Argentina	
97	Win	91–4–2	Francisco Bernabe Bobadilla	PTS	10	20 May 1994	Concordia, Entre Ríos, Argentina	
96	Win	90–4–2	Wilberforce Kiggundu	TKO	7 (10)	14 May 1994	Buenos Aires, Argentina	
95	Win	89–4–2	Francisco Bernabe Bobadilla	PTS	10	11 Apr 1994	Orán, Salta, Argentina	
94	Win	88–4–2	Juan Italo Meza	TKO	4 (10)	11 Mar 1994	Rosario de la Frontera, Salta, Argentina	
93	Win	87–4–2	Francisco de Assis	KO	9 (10)	12 Feb 1994	Buenos Aires, Argentina	
92	Win	86–4–2	Francisco de Assis	TKO	6 (10)	8 Jan 1994	Los Antiguos, Santa Cruz, Argentina	
91	Win	85–4–2	Brinatty Maquilon	TKO	7 (10)	10 Dec 1993	San Miguel, Tucumán, Argentina	
90	Win	84–4–2	Jorge Alberto Morello	TKO	5 (10)	1 Oct 1993	Buenos Aires, Argentina	
89	Win	83–4–2	Hector Abel Lescano	KO	9 (10)	16 Jul 1993	Comodoro Rivadavia, Chubut, Argentina	
88	Win	82–4–2	Brinatty Maquilon	PTS	10	26 Jun 1993	Buenos Aires, Argentina	
87	Win	81–4–2	Jose Laercio Bezerra de Lima	KO	2 (10)	18 Jun 1993	Puerto Madryn, Chubut, Argentina	
85	Win	80–4–2	Lorenzo Luis Garcia	PTS	10	3 Apr 1993	Temperley, Buenos Aires, Argentina	
85	Win	79–4–2	Abdenago Jofre	KO	2 (10)	19 Mar 1993	Trelew, Chubut, Argentina	
84	Win	78–4–2	Jacobo Garcia	TKO	5 (10)	22 Feb 1993	Mar del Plata, Buenos Aires, Argentina	
83	Win	77–4–2	Juan Italo Meza	PTS	10	12 Feb 1993	Trelew, Chubut, Argentina	
82	Win	76–4–2	Hector Hugo Vilte	KO	5 (10)	18 Dec 1992	Salta, Argentina	
81	Win	75–4–2	Lorenzo Luis Garcia	PTS	10	5 Dec 1992	La Plata, Buenos Aires, Argentina	
80	Win	74–4–2	Hector Abel Lescano	PTS	10	20 Nov 1992	Bella Vista, Buenos Aires, Argentina	
79	Win	73–4–2	Sergio Eduardo Ronconi	KO	3 (10)	12 Nov 1992	Pico Truncado, Santa Cruz, Argentina	
78	Win	72–4–2	Sandro Abel Vazquez	TKO	5 (10)	19 Sep 1992	Buenos Aires, Argentina	
77	Win	71–4–2	Danny Vargas	KO	1 (10)	14 Aug 1992	Buenos Aires, Argentina	
76	Loss	70–4–2	Roy Jones Jr.	UD	10	30 Jun 1992	Pensacola, Florida, United States	
75	Win	70–3–2	Eduardo Domingo Contreras	KO	8 (10)	13 Jun 1992	Junín, Buenos Aires, Argentina	
74	Win	69–3–2	Anibal Miranda	PTS	10	9 May 1992	Buenos Aires, Argentina	
73	Win	68–3–2	Ernesto Rafael Sena	KO	6 (12)	11 Apr 1992	Buenos Aires, Argentina	Retained Argentine light middleweight title
72	Loss	67–3–2	Terry Norris	UD	12	13 Dec 1991	Bercy, France	For WBC light middleweight title
71	Win	67–2–2	Joe Hernandez	TKO	1 (8)	24 Oct 1991	Paris, France	
70	Win	66–2–2	Julio Abel Gonzalez	PTS	10	13 Sep 1991	Posadas, Misiones, Argentina	
69	Win	65–2–2	Edmundo Antonio Diaz	TKO	5 (10)	6 Sep 1991	Caleta Olivia, Santa Cruz, Argentina	
68	Win	64–2–2	Juan Italo Meza	PTS	10	17 Aug 1991	Buenos Aires, Argentina	
67	Win	63–2–2	Mario Sanchez	KO	1 (10)	27 Jul 1991	Buenos Aires, Argentina	
66	Win	62–2–2	Antonio Madureira	KO	2 (10)	29 Jun 1991	Buenos Aires, Argentina	
65	Win	61–2–2	Hernan Raul Perez Ramos	TKO	6 (12)	7 Jun 1991	Comodoro Rivadavia, Chubut, Argentina	Retained South American light middleweight title
64	Win	60–2–2	Ikleff Ahmed Hadjalla	PTS	8	4 May 1991	Paris, France	
63	Win	59–2–2	Mario Alberto Gaston Chavez	TKO	8 (12)	13 Apr 1991	Río Gallegos, Santa Cruz, Argentina	Retained Argentine light middleweight title
62	Win	58–2–2	Miguel Angel Arroyo	KO	1 (12)	30 Mar 1991	Salta, Argentina	Retained South American light middleweight title
61	Win	57–2–2	Judas Clottey	SD	8	7 Mar 1991	Madrid, Spain	
60	Win	56–2–2	Bruno Ruben Godoy	TKO	5 (10)	22 Feb 1991	Tartagal, Salta, Argentina	
59	Win	55–2–2	Sergio Eduardo Ronconi	TKO	6 (10)	15 Feb 1991	Tartagal, Salta, Argentina	
58	Win	54–2–2	Ramon Rogue Garro	TKO	3 (10)	14 Jan 1991	Buenos Aires, Argentina	
57	Win	53–2–2	Felipe Nino Molinar	KO	4 (10)	21 Dec 1990	Río Gallegos, Santa Cruz, Argentina	
56	Win	52–2–2	Hugo Raul Marinangeli	TKO	12 (12)	14 Oct 1990	Santa Rosa, Salta, Argentina	Won South American light middleweight title
55	Loss	51–2–2	Hector Hugo Vilte	PTS	10	5 Oct 1990	Salta, Argentina	
54	Win	51–1–2	Francisco Bernabe Bobadilla	PTS	10	21 Sep 1990	Salta, Argentina	
53	Win	50–1–2	David Ellis Venegas	KO	1 (10)	7 Sep 1990	Salta, Argentina	
52	Win	49–1–2	Julio Abel Gonzalez	PTS	10	25 Aug 1990	San Salvador de Jujuy, Jujuy Province, Argentina	
51	Win	48–1–2	Ricardo Hector Silva	KO	3 (10)	22 Jun 1990	San Miguel, Tucumán, Argentina	
50	Win	47–1–2	Pedro Ramon Chavero	KO	2 (10)	15 Jun 1990	Pergamino, Buenos Aires, Argentina	
49	Win	46–1–2	Juan Italo Meza	UD	10	24 May 1990	Comodoro Rivadavia, Chubut, Argentina	
48	Win	45–1–2	Jorge Argentino Tejada	PTS	10	4 Apr 1990	Chacabuco, Buenos Aires, Argentina	
47	Win	44–1–2	Hector Abel Lescano	TKO	6 (10)	3 Mar 1990	Mar del Plata, Buenos Aires, Argentina	
46	Win	43–1–2	Cesar Roberto Guerrero	KO	6 (10)	8 Feb 1990	General Las Heras, Santa Cruz, Argentina	
45	Win	42–1–2	Daniel Omar Dominguez	TKO	2 (10)	23 Dec 1989	Buenos Aires, Argentina	
44	Win	41–1–2	Miguel Angel Arroyo	RTD	9 (10)	2 Dec 1989	Buenos Aires, Argentina	
43	Win	40–1–2	Juan Carlos Ortíz	KO	9 (10)	17 Nov 1989	Quilmes, Buenos Aires, Argentina	
41	Win	39–1–2	Jose Maria Julian Raies	KO	2 (10)	3 Nov 1989	Comodoro Rivadavia, Chubut, Argentina	
40	Win	38–1–2	Jack Torrance	TKO	5 (10)	27 Jul 1989	New York City, United States	
39	Loss	37–1–2	Lorenzo Luis Garcia	PTS	10	10 Jun 1989	Buenos Aires, Argentina	
38	Win	37–0–2	Jorge Alberto Morello	PTS	10	19 May 1989	Trelew, Chubut, Argentina	
37	Win	36–0–2	Hugo Raul Marinangeli	KO	4 (12)	14 Apr 1989	Comodoro Rivadavia, Chubut, Argentina	Won Argentine light middleweight title
37	Win	35–0–2	Ernesto Rafael Sena	PTS	10	20 Mar 1989	Mendoza, Argentina	
36	Win	34–0–2	Jorge Oscar Martinez	KO	4 (10)	10 Mar 1989	La Rioja, Argentina	
35	Win	33–0–2	Lorenzo Luis Garcia	PTS	10	27 Feb 1989	Mar del Plata, Buenos Aires, Argentina	
34	Win	32–0–2	Jose Eugenio Toloza	TKO	4 (10)	4 Feb 1989	Villa Carlos Paz, Cordoba, Argentina	
33	Win	31–0–2	Roberto Osvaldo Diaz	KO	1 (10)	23 Jan 1989	Mar del Plata, Buenos Aires, Argentina	
32	Win	30–0–2	Mario Edgardo Matthysse	TKO	7 (10)	23 Dec 1988	Trelew, Chubut, Argentina	
31	Win	29–0–2	Juan Carlos Ortíz	TKO	2 (10)	10 Dec 1988	Buenos Aires, Argentina	
30	Win	28–0–2	Jean-Pierre Iniama	TKO	4 (8)	22 Nov 1988	San Pellegrino, Abruzzo, Italy	
29	Win	27–0–2	Alphonso Bailey	KO	5 (8)	8 Nov 1988	Monte Carlo, Monaco	
28	Win	26–0–2	Ramon Angel Alegre	KO	4 (10)	22 Oct 1988	Buenos Aires, Argentina	
27	Win	25–0–2	Ramon Gaspar Abeldano	KO	1 (10)	8 Oct 1988	Comodoro Rivadavia, Chubut, Argentina	
26	Win	24–0–2	Fernando Dos Santos Ernesto	KO	2 (10)	24 Sep 1988	Buenos Aires, Argentina	
25	Win	23–0–2	Antonio Rene Juarez	PTS	10	10 Sep 1988	Caleta Olivia, Santa Cruz, Argentina	
24	Win	22–0–2	Ramon Gaspar Abeldano	UD	10	30 Jul 1988	Buenos Aires, Argentina	
23	Win	21–0–2	Robinson Rodrigo Zamora	KO	2 (10)	17 Jul 1988	Río Gallegos, Santa Cruz, Argentina	
22	Win	20–0–2	Carlos Fauriciano Pastran	RTD	2 (10)	2 Jul 1988	Buenos Aires, Argentina	
21	Win	19–0–2	Carlos Cesar Prieto	KO	7 (8)	17 Jun 1988	Comodoro Rivadavia, Chubut, Argentina	
20	Win	18–0–2	Carlos Victor Velazquez	KO	6 (10)	28 May 1988	Buenos Aires, Argentina	
19	Win	17–0–2	Ramon Florencio Ramos	KO	1 (10)	13 May 1988	Comodoro Rivadavia, Chubut, Argentina	
18	Win	16–0–2	Domingo Simon Sosa	TKO	1 (10)	9 Apr 1988	Caleta Olivia, Santa Cruz, Argentina	
17	Win	15–0–2	Hugo Alfredo Luero	TKO	7 (10)	19 Mar 1988	Comodoro Rivadavia, Chubut, Argentina	
16	Win	14–0–2	Cesar Oscar Perez	KO	1 (10)	4 Mar 1988	Comodoro Rivadavia, Chubut, Argentina	
15	Win	13–0–2	Pedro Ruiz	KO	3 (8)	19 Feb 1988	Catamarca, Argentina	
14	Win	12–0–2	Hugo Alfredo Luero	DQ	8 (10)	15 Jan 1988	Caleta Olivia, Santa Cruz, Argentina	
13	Win	11–0–2	Sergio Eduardo Ronconi	PTS	10	23 Dec 1987	Comodoro Rivadavia, Chubut, Argentina	
12	Win	10–0–2	Jose Alberto Alvarado	KO	3 (8)	11 Dec 1987	Comodoro Rivadavia, Chubut, Argentina	
11	Win	9–0–2	Jorge Pino	PTS	10	13 Nov 1987	Comodoro Rivadavia, Chubut, Argentina	
10	Win	8–0–2	Sergio Norberto Combis	PTS	10	9 Oct 1987	Comodoro Rivadavia, Chubut, Argentina	
9	Win	7–0–2	Antonio Rene Juarez	PTS	10	24 Sep 1987	Comodoro Rivadavia, Chubut, Argentina	
7	Win	6–0–2	Luis Armando Sanchez	TKO	2 (8)	12 Sep 1987	Caleta Olivia, Santa Cruz, Argentina	
7	Draw	5–0–2	Jorge Alberto Morello	PTS	10	4 Aug 1987	Caleta Olivia, Santa Cruz, Argentina	
6	Win	5–0–1	Carlos Omar Almada	RTD	3 (8)	3 Jul 1987	Caleta Olivia, Santa Cruz, Argentina	
5	Win	4–0–1	Sergio Saez	KO	1 (6)	5 Jun 1987	Comodoro Rivadavia, Chubut, Argentina	
4	Win	3–0–1	Jose Alberto Alvarado	KO	2 (8)	7 May 1987	Comodoro Rivadavia, Chubut, Argentina	
3	Win	2–0–1	Roberto Martinez	PTS	6	10 Apr 1987	Comodoro Rivadavia, Chubut, Argentina	
2	Draw	1–0–1	Jorge Alberto Morello	PTS	6	14 Mar 1987	Caleta Olivia, Santa Cruz, Argentina	
1	Win	1–0	Patricio German Caracci	KO	1 (6)	14 Feb 1987	Caleta Olivia, Santa Cruz, Argentina	

Sporting positions
World boxing titles
Vacant Title last held by John David Jackson	WBA middleweight champion 12 August 1994 – 19 December 1995	Succeeded by Shinji Takehara
Awards
Previous: Michael Carbajal KO7; Humberto González	The Ring Magazine Fight of the Year; KO9 John David Jackson; 1994	Next: Saman Sorjaturong KO7; Humberto González
Middleweight status
Preceded by Mike McCallum	Latest born world champion to die October 14, 2026 – present	Incumbent
