= John David Jackson (boxer) =

American boxer

Personal information
- Nickname: Action
- Born: May 17, 1963 (age 63) Denver, Colorado, U.S.
- Height: 5 ft 11 in (180 cm)
- Weight: Light middleweight; Middleweight; Super middleweight

Boxing career
- Reach: 74 in (188 cm)
- Stance: Southpaw

Boxing record
- Total fights: 41
- Wins: 36
- Win by KO: 20
- Losses: 4
- No contests: 1

John David Jackson (born May 17, 1963) is an American former professional boxer who competed from 1984 to 1999, and has since worked as a boxing trainer. He is a two-weight world champion, having held the World Boxing Organization (WBO) junior middleweight title twice between 1988 and 1993, and the World Boxing Association (WBA) middleweight title from 1993 to 1994.

== Professional career ==
Jackson turned professional in 1984 and won his first 20 fights. He won the inaugural WBO junior middleweight title in 1988 with a win over Lupe Aquino. He defended the title six times before moving up to middleweight in 1993 to take on WBA middleweight champion Reggie Johnson, winning a close decision.

After being stripped of his WBA title in August 1994, Jackson lost in an attempt to regain the belt in December of that year to Jorge Castro via 9th-round TKO, in a fight that was named Fight of the Year by Ring Magazine. On the verge of forcing a referee's stoppage against the badly beaten up Castro, Jackson was caught and knocked down by a left hook, then stopped after two further knockdowns. The sudden change in fortunes was one of the greatest turnarounds ever seen in a boxing match.

In 1997 he took on Bernard Hopkins for the IBF middleweight title. In an ugly fight in which Jackson looked a faded fighter, Hopkins won via a 7th-round TKO. Jackson took a rematch with Castro in 1998, but again came up short in losing a decision. He retired in 1999.

== Professional boxing record ==
41 fights	36 wins	4 losses
By knockout	20	2
By decision	16	2
No contests	1	

No.	Result	Record	Opponent	Type	Round, time	Date	Location	Notes
41	Win	36–4 (1)	Dave Boone	TKO	2	Sep 25, 1999	Pechanga Resort & Casino, Temecula, California, U.S.	
40	Loss	35–4 (1)	Jorge Castro	UD	10	Feb 20, 1998	Cipolletti, Argentina	For vacant WBA Fedelatin super middleweight title
39	Loss	35–3 (1)	Bernard Hopkins	TKO	7 (12), 2:22	Apr 19, 1997	Municipal Memorial Auditorium, Shreveport, Louisiana, U.S.	For IBF middleweight title
38	Loss	35–2 (1)	Abdullah Ramadan	SD	10	Nov 20, 1996	War Memorial Auditorium, Fort Lauderdale, Florida, U.S.	
37	Win	35–1 (1)	Augustine Renteria	UD	10	Jun 29, 1996	Fantasy Springs Resort Casino, Indio, California, U.S.	
36	Win	34–1 (1)	Guy Stanford	UD	10	Dec 16, 1995	CoreStates Spectrum, Philadelphia, Pennsylvania, U.S.	
35	Win	33–1 (1)	James Green	UD	8	Apr 29, 1995	USAir Arena, Landover, Maryland, U.S.	
34	Loss	32–1 (1)	Jorge Castro	TKO	9 (12), 2:34	Dec 10, 1994	Estadio de Béisbol, Monterrey, Mexico	For WBA middleweight title
33	Win	32–0 (1)	Danny Garcia	KO	7 (10)	Sep 24, 1994	Bally's Park Place, Atlantic City, New Jersey, U.S.	
32	Win	31–0 (1)	Jeff Johnson	RTD	7, 3:00	May 6, 1994	Convention Hall, Atlantic City, New Jersey, U.S.	
31	Win	30–0 (1)	Reggie Johnson	UD	12	Oct 1, 1993	Estadio Obras Sanitarias, Buenos Aires, Argentina	Won WBA middleweight title
30	Win	29–0 (1)	Charles LaCour	TKO	3 (10)	Sep 3, 1993	Tucson, Arizona, U.S.	
29	Win	28–0 (1)	Michele Mastrodonato	TKO	10 (12), 1:14	Dec 19, 1992	Palasport comunale Falcone e Borsellino, San Severo, Italy	Retained WBO junior middleweight title
28	Win	27–0 (1)	Sergio Medina	UD	10	Oct 22, 1992	Marriott Hotel, Irvine, California, U.S.	
27	Win	26–0 (1)	Eric Martin	UD	10	Sep 19, 1992	Pacific Sports Center, Tacoma, Washington, U.S.	
26	Win	25–0 (1)	Pat Lawlor	RTD	9 (12), 3:00	Jun 9, 1992	Civic Auditorium, San Francisco, California, U.S.	Retained WBO junior middleweight title
25	Win	24–0 (1)	Tyrone Trice	UD	12	Jul 21, 1991	Race Course, Atlantic City, New Jersey, U.S.	Retained WBO junior middleweight title
24	Win	23–0 (1)	Joaquin Velasquez	UD	10	May 10, 1991	Central Civic Center, Lewiston, Maine, U.S.	
23	Win	22–0 (1)	Chris Pyatt	UD	12	Oct 23, 1990	Granby Halls, Leicester, England	Won vacant WBO junior middleweight title
22	Win	21–0 (1)	Brinatty Maquilon	UD	10	Jul 24, 1990	Trump Plaza Hotel and Casino, Atlantic City, New Jersey, U.S.	
21	NC	20–0 (1)	Martin Camara	NC	11 (12)	Feb 17, 1990	Hotel Deauville, Châtillon, France	WBO junior middleweight title at stake; NC after an incorrect referee call
20	Win	20–0	Ruben Villaman	KO	2 (10)	Dec 1, 1989	Ramada Inn, Tucson, Arizona, U.S.	
19	Win	19–0	Steve Little	TKO	8 (12), 0:38	Apr 22, 1989	The Palace, Auburn Hills, Michigan, U.S.	Retained WBO junior middleweight title
18	Win	18–0	Lupe Aquino	RTD	7 (12), 3:00	Dec 8, 1988	Cobo Arena, Detroit, Michigan, U.S.	Won inaugural WBO junior middleweight title
17	Win	17–0	Aniseto Ramos	TKO	4	Oct 7, 1988	The Palace, Auburn Hills, Michigan, U.S.	
16	Win	16–0	Davey Moore	UD	10	Jul 21, 1987	Steel Pier, Atlantic City, New Jersey, U.S.	
15	Win	15–0	Sidney Outlaw	TKO	6 (12), 2:04	Jan 13, 1987	The Blue Horizon, Philadelphia, Pennsylvania, U.S.	Won vacant Pennsylvania junior middleweight title
14	Win	14–0	Johnny Banks Walker	KO	1	Nov 25, 1986	Broadway by the Bay Theater, Atlantic City, New Jersey, U.S.	
13	Win	13–0	Tony Ojo	TKO	3 (8), 1:13	Oct 28, 1986	Betsy Ross Inn, Pennsauken, New Jersey, U.S.	
12	Win	12–0	Milton Leaks	UD	8	Jul 31, 1986	Atlantic City, New Jersey, U.S.	
11	Win	11–0	Mike Castronova	TKO	1	Jun 14, 1986	Governor Mifflin Intermediate School Gym, Shillington, Pennsylvania, U.S.	
10	Win	10–0	Orlando Montalvo	KO	2 (10), 0:52	Feb 25, 1986	Tropicana, Atlantic City, New Jersey, U.S.	
9	Win	9–0	Vincent Mays	TKO	5 (6), 2:15	Sep 4, 1985	Steel Pier, Atlantic City, New Jersey, U.S.	
8	Win	8–0	Robert Thomas	UD	8	Jul 18, 1985	Golden Eagle Caterers, Philadelphia, Pennsylvania, U.S.	
7	Win	7–0	Billy Joe	TKO	1 (8), 2:31	Jun 13, 1985	Steel Pier, Atlantic City, New Jersey, U.S.	
6	Win	6–0	Gary Tibbs	TKO	4, 0:45	Mar 20, 1985	Sands, Atlantic City, New Jersey, U.S.	
5	Win	5–0	Felipe Montellano	UD	6	Oct 17, 1984	Broadway by the Bay Theater, Atlantic City, New Jersey, U.S.	
4	Win	4–0	Louis Owens	UD	6	Jun 26, 1984	Tropicana, Atlantic City, New Jersey, U.S.	
3	Win	3–0	Robert Thomas	PTS	6	May 10, 1984	J&A Caterers, Philadelphia, Pennsylvania, U.S.	
2	Win	2–0	Keith Todd	KO	3	Apr 11, 1984	Catholic Youth Center, Scranton, Pennsylvania, U.S.	
1	Win	1–0	Kimbrady Carriker	KO	1 (6)	Mar 11, 1984	Sands, Atlantic City, New Jersey, U.S.	

== Training career ==
After his professional boxing career ended, Jackson has worked as a trainer. Boxers he has worked with include:

- Claressa Shields (starting with her bout with Hanna Gabriel)
- Sergey Kovalev
- Kimbo Slice (UFC fighter turned pro boxer)
- Allan Green (starting with his bout Anthony Bonsante)
- Bernard Hopkins (for his bout with Antonio Tarver)
- Shane Mosley (starting with his second bout with Winky Wright and ending after his first bout with Fernando Vargas)
- Nate Campbell (The first fighter Jackson led to a world title)
- Dyah Davis (Son of 1976 Olympic gold medalist Howard Davis Jr.)
- Brad Solomon
- Khabib Allakhverdiev
- Magomed Abdusalamov
- Chris Algieri
- Curtis Stevens (currently)

Sporting positions
World boxing titles
Inaugural champion	WBO junior middleweight champion December 8, 1988 – February 17, 1990; Title declared vacant after NC	Vacant Title next held by Himself
Vacant Title last held by Himself	WBO junior middleweight champion October 23, 1990 – August 5, 1993; Vacated	Vacant Title next held by Verno Phillips
Preceded by Reggie Johnson	WBA middleweight champion October 1, 1993 – May 6, 1994; Stripped	Vacant Title next held by Jorge Castro
