= Vaiden Field Airport =

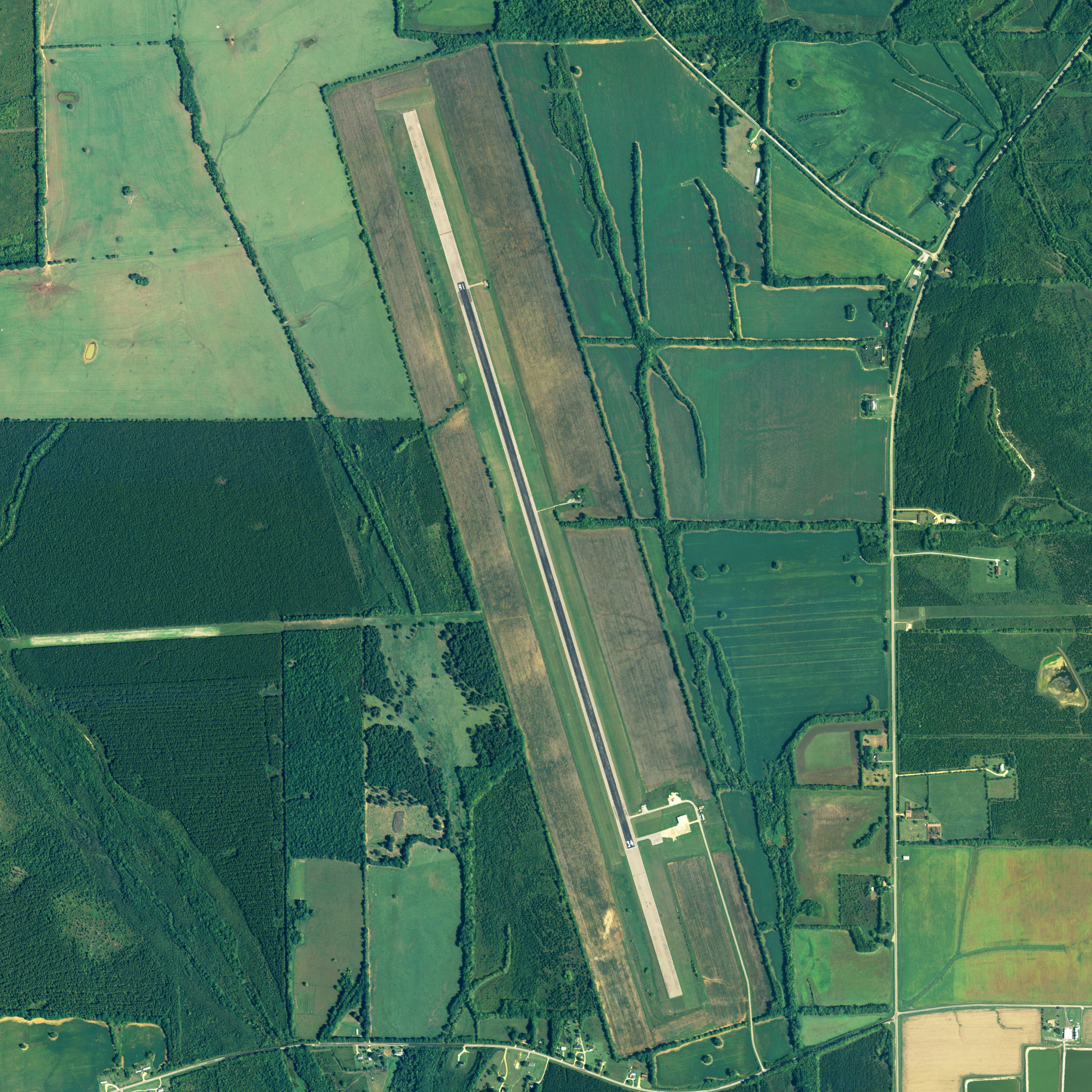
- NAIP aerial image, 29 June 2006
- IATA: none; ICAO: none; FAA LID: A08

Summary
- Airport type: Public
- Owner: Perry County Airport and Industrial Authority
- Serves: Marion, Alabama
- Elevation AMSL: 225 ft / 69 m
- Coordinates: 32°30′38″N 087°23′05″W
- Interactive map of Vaiden Field Airport

Runways
Direction	Length		Surface
Direction	ft	m	Surface
16/34	6,377	1,944	Asphalt

Statistics (2010)
- Aircraft operations: 2,071
- Source: Federal Aviation Administration

Vaiden Field Airport (FAA LID: A08) is a public-use airport located eight nautical miles (9 mi, 15 km) southwest of the central business district of Marion, in the community of Vaiden, Perry County, Alabama, United States. It is owned by the Perry County Airport and Industrial Authority.

Viaden Airfield was constructed to serve as an auxiliary airfield for Craig Air Force Base near Selma, Alabama. At that time it had 8000 feet of runway and was used for touch-and-go landings for T-37 aircraft. Runway supervisors drove from Craig AFB to direct flight operations.

== Facilities and aircraft ==
Vaiden Field Airport covers an area of 480 acres (194 ha) at an elevation of 225 feet (69 m) above mean sea level. It has one runway designated 16/34 with an asphalt surface measuring 6,377 by 80 feet (1,944 x 24 m). For the 12-month period ending October 8, 2010, the airport had 2,071 general aviation aircraft operations, an average of 172 per month.

In December 2008 a new lighting system was installed including beacon, runway lights and signs, segmented windcone, PAPIs (not certified as of April 2009) and electrical vault. The runway was also resurfaced.

== See also ==
- List of airports in Alabama
