= Vincent Pettway =

American boxer

Personal information
- Nickname: The Ambassador
- Born: November 9, 1965 (age 60) Baltimore, Maryland, U.S.
- Height: 5 ft 8 1/2 in (174 cm)
- Weight: Light middleweight

Boxing career
- Stance: Orthodox

Boxing record
- Total fights: 51
- Wins: 43
- Win by KO: 32
- Losses: 7
- Draws: 1

Vincent Pettway (born November 9, 1965) is an American former professional boxer who competed from 1984 to 2001, holding the IBF light middleweight title from 1994 to 1995.

== Professional career ==
Known as "The Ambassador," Pettway turned pro in 1984, and won the USBA light middleweight title in 1992 with a points win over Gilbert Baptist. He challenged Gianfranco Rosi for the IBF light middleweight Title in 1994 in a bout that was ruled a sixth round technical draw. Later that year, Pettway got a second shot at Rosi and won via a fourth round KO.

In 1995, Pettway defended against Simon Brown, perhaps his best-known performance, in which he devastatingly knocked Brown out in round six. After Brown was dropped with a perfect left hook, Brown continued to throw punches in a concussed state.

Pettway lost the title in the next defense against Paul Vaden via twelfth round TKO. In 1996 he took on Terry Norris for the WBC and IBF light middleweight Titles, but was TKO'd in the 8th. He fought until 2001 but never fought for another title.

== Honors ==
Pettway was a Class of 2006 Inductee into the Maryland Boxing Hall of Fame.

== See also ==
- List of IBF world champions

Preceded by Gianfranco Rosi	IBF Light Middleweight boxing champion 17 Sep 1994–12 Aug 1995	Succeeded by Paul Vaden
