= Lupe Aquino =

Mexican boxer

Personal information
- Nickname: Isaias Guadalupe Aquino
- Born: 23 January 1963 (age 63) Chihuahua, Chihuahua, Mexico
- Height: 5 ft 7 in (1.70 m)
- Weight: Welterweight; Light middleweight Middleweight

Boxing career

Boxing record
- Total fights: 64
- Wins: 53
- Win by KO: 36
- Losses: 9
- Draws: 2

Isaias Guadalupe "Lupe" Aquino (born 23 January 1963) is a Mexican former professional boxer who competed from 1981 to 1999 and held the WBC Light Middleweight title in 1987.

Aquino, known as "Lupe", turned pro in 1981 and won the WBC light middleweight title in 1987 with a decision over Duane Thomas. He lost the title in his first defense via a close decision to Gianfranco Rosi. In 1988 Aquino took on John David Jackson for the inaugural WBO light middleweight title. In the fight, Aquino was put down in 1st and retired after the 7th round. In 1993, Aquino would again challenge for the vacant WBO light middleweight title against Verno Phillips on a Top Rank fight card that also featured Michael Carbajal's successful defense of the unified WBC and IBF light flyweight titles against challenger Domingo Sosa as well as up and coming prospect Oscar De La Hoya. Philips defeated Aquino by 7th round technical knockout (0:57). After the loss to Philips, Aquino continued to fight until 1999 but never again challenged for a major title. His most notable fight in that time period was likely against Bernard Hopkins, which he lost by unanimous decision.

Aquino also has a fifth-round technical knockout win over former number-one ranked Steve Hearon.

== See also ==
- List of WBC world champions
- List of Mexican boxing world champions

Achievements
Regional boxing titles
Vacant Title last held by Milton McCrory	NABF super welterweight champion June 24, 1988 – November 10, 1988; Stripped	Vacant Title next held by Terry Norris
World boxing titles
Preceded by Duane Thomas	WBC Light Middleweight champion 12 July – 2 October 1987	Succeeded by Gianfranco Rosi
