= Troy Waters =

Australian boxer

Personal information
- Nickname: The Glamour With The Hammer
- Nationality: Australian
- Born: Troy Weston Waters; 23 April 1965 London, UK
- Died: 18 May 2018 (aged 53) Sydney, New South Wales, Australia
- Height: 180 cm (5 ft 11 in)
- Weight: Light middleweight

Boxing career
- Reach: 180 cm (71 in)
- Stance: Orthodox

Boxing record
- Total fights: 33
- Wins: 28
- Win by KO: 20
- Losses: 5

Troy Weston Waters (23 April 1965 – 18 May 2018) was an Australian light middleweight boxer and member of the Australian National Boxing Hall of Fame. Waters fought for the world title three times during his career, losing to Gianfranco Rosi, Terry Norris and Simon Brown. He was the son of Cec Waters and the younger brother of boxers Dean and Guy.

== Early life ==
Troy and his brothers were initially trained by their father who was a brutal taskmaster. Troy said their life was like a "military camp where it was boxing for breakfast, lunch and dinner". Waters fought as a junior middleweight.

== Professional career ==
Waters turned pro in 1984 and won his first five professional fights before losing to future WBA super middleweight champion In-Chul Baek for the OPBF light middleweight title. Waters lost a twelve-round decision. In 1987, he won the Commonwealth Title knocking out Lloyd Hibbert in the fourth round. He successfully defended the title four times. In his 16th fight and on a nine fight win streak he fought Gianfranco Rosi in Italy for the IBF Super Welterweight (light middleweight) title on 27 October 1989. The bout went the distance but was fairly one-sided, with the defending champion retaining his belt in a 12 Round unanimous decision.

Waters second attempt at a world title came six wins later in 1993 in San Diego when he lost to WBC light middleweight champ Terry Norris in three rounds. The second round of his fight with Norris was named The Ring's "round of the year" for 1993. Waters knocked down Norris in the second round, but lost by TKO in the third round. Just two fights later Waters lost his third and final title fight to Simon Brown in Las Vegas by majority decision. In his next fight he defeated Mexican and former WBC welterweight champion Jorge Vaca.

After a car accident and almost retiring, his last major fight for promoter Don King, was a loss in the first round in a WBC eliminator match to future champion Félix Trinidad, in August 1997 at Madison Square Garden. He ended his career stopping Ambrose Mlilo to finish at 28–5, with 20 knockouts. Troy was the 2009 Inductee for the Australian National Boxing Hall of Fame Moderns category.

== Death ==
Waters was diagnosed with acute myeloid leukaemia, a rare form of blood cancer, in July 2014. He died on 18 May 2018, leaving his wife Michelle and two children. In tribute, former Australian World Champion Jeff Fenech said "He was a great fighter, a great person, a great human."

== Professional boxing record ==
33 fights	28 wins	5 losses
By knockout	20	2
By decision	8	3
