= Vaiden, Alabama =

Unincorporated community in Brownsville, Alabama

- Unincorporated community
- Location within Alabama Location within the United States
- Coordinates: 32°31′11″N 87°22′16″W
- Country: United States
- State: Alabama
- County: Perry
- Elevation: 194 ft (59 m)
- Time zone: UTC-6 (Central (CST))
  - Summer (DST): UTC-5 (CDT)
- Area code: 334
- GNIS feature ID: 157194

Vaiden, also known as Cunningham, is an unincorporated community in Perry County, Alabama, United States. Vaiden is located on Alabama State Route 5, 8.9 miles (14.3 km) south southeast of Marion.

== History ==
A post office operated under the name Vaiden from 1900 to 1906. Vaiden is home to Vaiden Field, a public-use airport owned and operated by the Perry County Airport and Industrial Authority. Vaiden Field was built as an auxiliary practice airstrip for Craig Air Force Base in Selma.

Two types of clay and loam, known as Vaiden clay and Vaiden fine sandy loam, are found in the area.
