= Paul Vaden =

American boxer

Personal information
- Nickname: The Ultimate
- Nationality: American
- Born: 29 December 1967 (age 58) San Diego, California, U.S.
- Height: 6 ft 1 1/2 in (187 cm)
- Weight: Light-middleweight; Middleweight

Boxing career
- Reach: 75 in (191 cm)

Boxing record
- Total fights: 32
- Wins: 29
- Win by KO: 16
- Losses: 3

Paul Vaden (born December 29, 1967) is an American former professional boxer who competed from 1991 to 2000, holding the IBF light middleweight title in 1995. He remains the only native San Diegan to become a professional world boxing champion.

== Amateur career ==
Known as "Kid Ultimate", Vaden had a highly accomplished amateur career, compiling an outstanding amateur record of 327–10. In 1990 Vaden became the United States national amateur light middleweight champion. (Link to – United States national amateur boxing light middleweight champions). Vaden was also a bronze medal winner in the 71 kg (156 lbs) division at the 1990 Goodwill Games. A top candidate to make the 1992 U.S. Olympic team Vaden instead decided to turn professional, citing dissatisfaction with amateur boxing's newly implemented scoring system, and the sport's political nature as chief among his reasons.

== Professional career ==
Vaden, now campaigning as "The Ultimate", turned pro on April 5, 1991, and began his career with 18 consecutive wins. On March 25, 1994, he won the IBF Inter-Continental Junior Middleweight title with a 12-round unanimous decision over veteran John Montes.

On August 12, 1995, at the MGM Grand Garden Arena in Las Vegas as a decided underdog, Vaden defeated Vincent Pettway by 12th round TKO to win Pettway's IBF 154 lb title. Pettway built an early lead but faded as the fight went on. Vaden came on strong in the later rounds, and the referee, Richard Steele, stopped the fight with 27 seconds left in the 12th round. At the time of the stoppage Vaden, despite appearing to be winning the fight to ringsiders, was surprisingly behind by 1 point on all three judges' scorecards.

=== Norris vs. Vaden ===
On December 16, 1995, at the Spectrum in Philadelphia, Vaden met WBC light-middleweight champion Terry Norris in a title unification bout. The pre-fight build-up was notable for the animosity displayed between the two fighters.

The fight itself turned out to be one-sided, Norris dominated Vaden and scored a decisive unanimous decision to claim Vaden's IBF title. Judge George Hill scored the fight 119–109, judge Barbara Perez scored it 118–110, and judge William James scored the fight 120–108.

=== Later career ===
Vaden was to challenge one more time for a world title, losing by TKO in 11 rounds to WBC middleweight champion Keith Holmes on December 5, 1997, at the Pompano Beach Amphitheatre, Pompano Beach, Florida. Vaden was knocked down twice in the 4th, and once in the 11th round. Referee Brian Garry stopped the bout shortly after the knockdown in the 11th.

On November 20, 1999, at the Trump Taj Mahal in Atlantic City, New Jersey, Vaden won the vacant USBA junior middleweight title by knocking out Stephan Johnson in the 10th round. Johnson never regained consciousness and died 15 days later. Johnson had lost by knockout 7 months prior to his fight with Vaden, and it is suspected he might have entered the bout with Vaden with a pre-existing brain injury. Vaden was to retire shortly after the Johnson fight.

In Vaden's final bout he lost his USBA light-middleweight title to NABA champion Jose Alfredo (Shibata) Flores by unanimous decision on April 15, 2000.

== Professional boxing record ==
32 fights	29 wins	3 losses
By knockout	16	1
By decision	13	2

Sporting positions
Regional boxing titles
Vacant Title last held by Carl Daniels	USBA super welterweight champion November 20, 1999 – April 15, 2000	Succeeded by Jose Flores
World boxing titles
Preceded by Vincent Pettway	IBF Light Middleweight champion August 12 – December 16, 1995	Succeeded by Terry Norris
