= Terry Norris (boxer) =

American boxer

Personal information
- Nickname: Terrible
- Born: Terry Wayne Norris; June 17, 1967 (age 59) Lubbock, Texas, USA
- Height: 5 ft 9 in (175 cm)
- Weight: Light middleweight

Boxing career
- Reach: 68 in (173 cm)
- Stance: Orthodox

Boxing record
- Total fights: 56
- Wins: 47
- Win by KO: 31
- Losses: 9

Terry Wayne Norris (born June 17, 1967) is an American former professional boxer who competed from 1986 to 1998. He is a three time light middleweight champion, having held the World Boxing Council (WBC) and International Boxing Federation (IBF) titles.

== Early years and amateur career ==
A star baseball player during his high school years, Norris bypassed a career on the diamond for one in the ring, claiming an amateur record of 291–4, winning 4 Texas State Golden Gloves titles. Displaying a stunning combination of hand and foot speed as well as the ability to throw dizzying combos, Norris' athletic ability was an uncanny attribute in the ring.

== Professional boxing career ==
Norris turned professional in August 1986. He outpointed future middleweight title holder Quincy Taylor in August 1988. Norris beat future super-middleweight champion Steve Little to win the vacant NABF light-middleweight title in December 1988, and defended it against former IBF title holder Buster Drayton. Norris also picked up two losses; a unanimous decision to Derrick Kelley, and a disqualification loss to Joe Walker in the first round after Norris hit Walker when Walker was down.

In July 1989 at Atlantic City Convention Center, New Jersey, Norris challenged Julian Jackson for the WBA light-middleweight title. Norris won the first round with his speed and movement, but a big right cross from the champion knocked Norris down in round two. Norris made it to his feet before the count but was deemed unfit to continue by referee Joe Cortez.

=== First championship reign ===
After winning three comeback fights, including a victory over former welterweight champion Jorge Vaca, Norris traveled to Tampa, Florida, in March 1990 to challenge John Mugabi for the WBC light-middleweight title. Norris wasted no time in stopping the champion, flooring him twice in the first round - the second time for the full count - and thus starting what would be the first of three reigns as champion.

After defending his belt against Rene Jacquot, Norris faced the legendary Sugar Ray Leonard in Madison Square Garden in February 1991. Norris scored two knockdowns and easily beat the faded Sugar Ray via a 12-round unanimous verdict. His next defense, a June victory over another former undisputed welterweight champion - Donald Curry - further cemented Norris' place in the history of the 154-lb division as Norris wore down his foe and knocked him out in the eighth.

Other prominent foes in that first reign included the tough future middleweight titlist Jorge Castro, and two reigning welterweight champions; WBA title-holder Meldrick Taylor, and IBF title-holder Maurice Blocker.

=== Losing and regaining titles ===
In a shocking upset in December, 1993, Simon Brown, former WBC and IBF welterweight titlist, knocked out Norris in four rounds to win the title and halt Norris' defense streak at ten. Ring magazine named this fight as their "Upset of the Year" for 1993. In their rematch, Norris then regained the title by unanimous decision over Brown in May 1994.

His second reign proved short when he lost the title by disqualification to Luis Santana in November, 1994. The decision to disqualify Norris was controversial. Norris hit Santana in the back of the head and Santana went down, claiming he was unable to continue. Some at ringside, however, felt that Santana refused to get up in order to gain the disqualification win. Because of the controversial nature of the match, a rematch was ordered. Norris also lost the April, 1995, rematch by disqualification, this time for hitting Santana after the bell had sounded to end the round. Norris was given yet another shot at regaining the title, and in their third fight in August of that year, Norris knocked out Santana in two rounds.

=== Unification ===
In December 1995 Norris won a unanimous decision over San Diego rival Paul Vaden to add Vaden's IBF title to his WBC title, plus the vacant Lineal championship. Norris made defenses against former IBF champion Vincent Pettway, Nick Rupa, and Alex Rios, before being stripped of the IBF title in 1997.

Keith Mullings ended Norris's championship career by way of ninth-round stoppage in December 1997, which also ended plans for superfights with WBC welterweight champion Oscar De La Hoya and with IBF Welterweight champion Felix Trinidad of Puerto Rico.

=== Post-championship career ===
Norris fought twice more after losing his title. Dana Rosenblatt defeated him by unanimous decision in a middleweight bout and then WBA junior middleweight champion Laurent Boudouani ended his boxing career with a ninth-round knockout.

Norris was elected to the International Boxing Hall of Fame in 2005.

Norris suffers from pugilistic dementia and Parkinson's disease caused by his boxing career. This affects his speech and coordination.

== Professional boxing record ==
| 56 fights | 47 wins | 9 losses |
|---|---|---|
| By knockout | 31 | 4 |
| By decision | 16 | 5 |

| No. | Result | Record | Opponent | Type | Round, time | Date | Location | Notes |
|---|---|---|---|---|---|---|---|---|
| 56 | Loss | 47–9 | Laurent Boudouani | TKO | 9 (12), 2:59 | Nov 30, 1998 | Palais des Sports, Paris, France | For WBA light middleweight title |
| 55 | Loss | 47–8 | Dana Rosenblatt | UD | 12 | Sep 25, 1998 | Foxwoods, Mashantucket, Connecticut, US | |
| 54 | Loss | 47–7 | Keith Mullings | TKO | 9 (12), 0:51 | Dec 6, 1997 | Caesars, Atlantic City, New Jersey, US | Lost WBC light middleweight title |
| 53 | Win | 47–6 | Andres Arellano Sandoval | KO | 2 (10), 2:27 | Sep 10, 1997 | The Aladdin, Las Vegas, Nevada, US | |
| 52 | Win | 46–6 | Joaquin Velasquez | KO | 2 (10), 0:45 | Aug 8, 1997 | Station Casino, Kansas City, Missouri, US | |
| 51 | Win | 45–6 | Nick Rupa | TKO | 10 (12), 2:38 | Jan 11, 1997 | Nashville Arena, Nashville, Tennessee, US | Retained WBC and IBF light middleweight titles |
| 50 | Win | 44–6 | Alex Rios | TKO | 5 (12), 2:08 | Sep 7, 1996 | MGM Grand Garden Arena, Las Vegas, Nevada, US | Retained WBC and IBF light middleweight titles |
| 49 | Win | 43–6 | Vincent Pettway | TKO | 8 (12), 2:41 | Feb 24, 1996 | Richmond Coliseum, Richmond, Virginia, US | Retained WBC and IBF light middleweight titles |
| 48 | Win | 42–6 | Jorge Luis Vado | TKO | 2 (12), 0:42 | Jan 27, 1996 | Arizona Veterans Memorial Coliseum, Phoenix, Arizona, US | Retained WBC and IBF light middleweight titles |
| 47 | Win | 41–6 | Paul Vaden | UD | 12 | Dec 16, 1995 | Core States Spectrum, Philadelphia, Pennsylvania, US | Retained WBC light middleweight title; Won IBF light middleweight title |
| 46 | Win | 40–6 | David Gonzalez | TKO | 9 (12), 2:59 | Sep 16, 1995 | The Mirage, Las Vegas, Nevada, US | Retained WBC light middleweight title |
| 45 | Win | 39–6 | Luis Santana | TKO | 2 (12), 2:09 | Aug 19, 1995 | MGM Grand Garden Arena, Las Vegas, Nevada, US | Won WBC light middleweight title |
| 44 | Loss | 38–6 | Luis Santana | DQ | 3 (12), 3:00 | Apr 8, 1995 | Caesars Palace, Las Vegas, Nevada, US | For WBC light middleweight title; Norris DQ'd for hitting Santana after the bell |
| 43 | Loss | 38–5 | Luis Santana | DQ | 5 (12), 2:02 | Nov 12, 1994 | Plaza Mexico, Mexico City, Mexico | Lost WBC light middleweight title; Norris DQ'd for downing Santana with a blow to the back of the head |
| 42 | Win | 38–4 | Simon Brown | UD | 12 | May 7, 1994 | MGM Grand Garden Arena, Las Vegas, Nevada, US | Won WBC light middleweight title |
| 41 | Win | 37–4 | Armando Campas | KO | 4 (10), 2:19 | Mar 18, 1994 | MGM Grand Garden Arena, Las Vegas, Nevada, US | |
| 40 | Loss | 36–4 | Simon Brown | KO | 4 (12), 1:06 | Dec 18, 1993 | Estadio Cuauhtemoc, Puebla, Mexico | Lost WBC light middleweight title |
| 39 | Win | 36–3 | Joe Gatti | TKO | 1 (12), 1:28 | Sep 10, 1993 | Alamodome, San Antonio, Texas, US | Retained WBC light middleweight title |
| 38 | Win | 35–3 | Troy Waters | RTD | 3 (12) | Jun 19, 1993 | San Diego Sports Arena, San Diego, California, US | Retained WBC light middleweight title |
| 37 | Win | 34–3 | Maurice Blocker | TKO | 2 (12), 0:49 | Feb 20, 1993 | Estadio Azteca, Mexico City, Mexico | Retained WBC light middleweight title |
| 36 | Win | 33–3 | Pat Lawlor | RTD | 3 (10), 3:00 | Dec 13, 1992 | The Mirage, Las Vegas, Nevada, US | |
| 35 | Win | 32–3 | Meldrick Taylor | TKO | 4 (12), 2:55 | May 9, 1992 | The Mirage, Las Vegas, Nevada, US | Retained WBC light middleweight title |
| 34 | Win | 31–3 | Carl Daniels | TKO | 9 (12), 2:37 | Feb 22, 1992 | San Diego Sports Arena, San Diego, California, US | Retained WBC light middleweight title |
| 33 | Win | 30–3 | Jorge Fernando Castro | UD | 12 | Dec 13, 1991 | Palais omnisports, Bercy, Paris, France | Retained WBC light middleweight title |
| 32 | Win | 29–3 | Brett Lally | TKO | 1 (12), 2:40 | Aug 17, 1991 | San Diego Sports Arena, San Diego, California, US | Retained WBC light middleweight title |
| 31 | Win | 28–3 | Donald Curry | KO | 8 (12), 2:54 | Jun 1, 1991 | Radisson Resort, Palm Springs, California, US | Retained WBC light middleweight title |
| 30 | Win | 27–3 | Sugar Ray Leonard | UD | 12 | Feb 9, 1991 | Madison Square Garden, New York City, New York, US | Retained WBC light middleweight title |
| 29 | Win | 26–3 | Rene Jacquot | UD | 12 | Jul 13, 1990 | Patinoire d'Annecy, Annecy, Upper Savoy, France | Retained WBC light middleweight title |
| 28 | Win | 25–3 | John Mugabi | KO | 1 (12), 2:47 | Mar 31, 1990 | Sun Dome, Tampa, Florida, US | Won WBC light middleweight title |
| 27 | Win | 24–3 | Tony Montgomery | UD | 12 | Nov 21, 1989 | Santa Monica Civic Auditorium, Santa Monica, California, US | |
| 26 | Win | 23–3 | Jorge Vaca | SD | 10 | Oct 9, 1989 | Tijuana, Baja California, Mexico | |
| 25 | Win | 22–3 | Nathan Dryer | TKO | 4 (10) | Sep 21, 1989 | El Cortez Hotel, San Diego, California, US | |
| 24 | Loss | 21–3 | Julian Jackson | TKO | 2 (12), 1:33 | Jul 30, 1989 | Atlantic City Convention Center, New Jersey, US | For WBA light middleweight title |
| 23 | Win | 21–2 | Ralph Ward | UD | 10 | Mar 23, 1989 | The Showboat, New Jersey, US | |
| 22 | Win | 20–2 | Buster Drayton | UD | 12 | Mar 28, 1989 | Showboat Hotel and Casino, Las Vegas, Nevada, US | Retained NABF light middleweight title |
| 21 | Win | 19–2 | Steve Little | TKO | 6 (12), 1:06 | Dec 9, 1988 | Caesars Palace, Las Vegas, Nevada, US | Won vacant NABF light middleweight title |
| 20 | Win | 18–2 | Gilbert Baptist | UD | 10 | Oct 18, 1988 | El Cortez Hotel, San Diego, California, US | |
| 19 | Win | 17–2 | Quincy Taylor | UD | 10 | Aug 12, 1988 | Caesars Palace, Las Vegas, Nevada, US | |
| 18 | Win | 16–2 | Clayton Hires | KO | 2 (10) | Mar 28, 1988 | Great Western Forum, Inglewood, California, US | |
| 17 | Win | 15–2 | Richard Aguirre | TKO | 3 (10) | Feb 3, 1988 | Riverside, California, US | |
| 16 | Win | 14–2 | Roman Nunez | KO | 1 (10) | Jan 21, 1988 | San Diego, California, US | |
| 15 | Loss | 13–2 | Joe Walker | DQ | 1 (6) | Nov 25, 1987 | Bally's, Las Vegas, Nevada, US | |
| 14 | Win | 13–1 | Edward Neblett | TKO | 6 (8), 2:10 | Sep 4, 1987 | Bally's, Las Vegas, Nevada, US | |
| 13 | Loss | 12–1 | Derrick Kelly | UD | 10 | Aug 13, 1987 | Great Western Forum, Inglewood, California, US | |
| 12 | Win | 12–0 | Nathan Dryer | TKO | 3 (8), 1:33 | May 27, 1987 | Showboat Hotel and Casino, Las Vegas, Nevada, US | |
| 11 | Win | 11–0 | Sergio Nieto Rayos | TKO | 1 (6), 0:40 | Apr 3, 1987 | Caesars Palace, Las Vegas, Nevada, US | |
| 10 | Win | 10–0 | Mauro Veronica | KO | 2 (6), 2:36 | Mar 26, 1987 | Olympic Auditorium, Los Angeles, California, US | |
| 9 | Win | 9–0 | Tino Leon | KO | 1 (4), 2:45 | Mar 16, 1987 | Great Western Forum, Inglewood, California, US | |
| 8 | Win | 8–0 | Dick Green | KO | 1 (6), 0:53 | Feb 26, 1987 | El Cortez Hotel, San Diego, California, US | |
| 7 | Win | 7–0 | Gilbert Baptist | UD | 4 | Mar 5, 1987 | Raincross Square, Riverside, California, US | |
| 6 | Win | 6–0 | Lang McGowan | PTS | 4 | Dec 3, 1986 | Great Western Forum, Inglewood, California, US | |
| 5 | Win | 5–0 | Carlos Gutierrez | UD | 6 | Nov 21, 1986 | Reseda Country Club, Los Angeles, California, US | |
| 4 | Win | 4–0 | Daryl Colquitt | KO | 4 (4) | Oct 7, 1986 | Reseda Country Club, Los Angeles, California, US | |
| 3 | Win | 3–0 | George Murphy | PTS | 4 | Sep 25, 1986 | Great Western Forum, Inglewood, California, US | |
| 2 | Win | 2–0 | Carlos Gutierrez | UD | 4 | Aug 13, 1986 | Great Western Forum, Inglewood, California, US | |
| 1 | Win | 1–0 | Jose Luis Cordova | KO | 1 (?) | Aug 2, 1986 | San Jose Civic Auditorium, San Jose, California, US | |

== Additional information ==
- Once entertaining scholarships to several schools, Norris quit baseball after a brawl on the field. "We were playing another team one day", Norris recalled, "and there were some racial comments made toward me. I was a little thrown off by it. I rushed the guy who said them, and their whole team jumped on me. I put three guys in the hospital, which was the bad thing of it. People said things like, 'Maybe this guy's a troublemaker,' so a lot of my scholarships fell through.
- He settled a lawsuit out of court with Don King for a sum of $7.5 million in 2005.
- Brother of former WBA cruiserweight champion Orlin Norris.
- The speech of Terry Norris was noticeably slurred even in his early thirties and quite startling to anyone who remembered him from just a few years earlier. After his last defeat, the Nevada athletic commission turned him down for a new license, basing its decision on his impaired speech, which was indicative of his issues after boxing.
- Norris was known to spar 12 rounds every other day in preparation for fights. Some speculate that this intense training routine is a factor which may have ultimately led to his early expiration as a fighter.
- In preparation for his fight against John "The Beast" Mugabi, his strength trainer put Terry on a regimented weight training program. He went on to KO Mugabi and win the WBC super welterweight title. He continued his strength training for the duration of his career.
- A source close to the Norris camp is quoted as saying "The best boxing I ever watched live was sparring between the Norris brothers."
- Norris is married to Tanya E. Norris
- Norris and his wife founded his Foundation The Final Fight to assist former pro boxers who are ill, broke and homeless.
- Norris and his wife own World Champion Cardio Boxing, a popular workout program in Los Angeles, California.

Sporting positions
Regional boxing titles
| Vacant Title last held by Lupe Aquino | NABF light middleweight champion December 9, 1988 – March 31, 1990 | Vacant Title next held by Brett Lally |
World boxing titles
| Preceded by John Mugabi | WBC light middleweight champion March 31, 1990 – December 18, 1993 | Succeeded by Simon Brown |
| Preceded by Simon Brown | WBC light middleweight champion May 7, 1994 – November 12, 1994 | Succeeded by Luis Santana |
| Preceded by Luis Santana | WBC light middleweight champion August 19, 1995 – December 6, 1997 | Succeeded by Keith Mullings |
| Preceded by Paul Vaden | IBF light middleweight champion December 16, 1995 – March 19, 1997; Stripped | Succeeded by Raúl Márquez |
Awards
| Previous: Buster Douglas; KO10 Mike Tyson | KO Magazine Upset of the Year; W12 Sugar Ray Leonard; 1991 | Next: Azumah Nelson; KO8 Jeff Fenech |
