= Boxing in the 1990s =

As in the 1980s, the 1990s in boxing's popularity focused on all divisions. When 1980s legends Sugar Ray Leonard, Thomas Hearns, as well as others retired, newer superstars filled the void: Pernell Whitaker, Julio César Chávez, in the early 1990s, Oscar De La Hoya, Félix Trinidad, Roy Jones Jr. and Floyd Mayweather Jr. in the mid to late 1990s.

As for the heavyweight division, Mike Tyson's reign ended prematurely with the upset loss to Buster Douglas. Former cruiserweight champion, Evander Holyfield took over as the undisputed champion of the division, and later built a rivalry against former Olympic silver medalist, Riddick Bowe. The later 1990s was dominated by Lennox Lewis who unified the division in 1999.

The 1990s also saw the emergence of the battles between the British super middleweight fighters Chris Eubank, Michael Watson and Nigel Benn.

Less known prominent 1990s to 2000 boxers were super welterweight Adrian Stone(33-5, 26 KOs) and welterweight Melvin Casper (11-0, 8 KOs), both of Paterson, New Jersey.

== List of notable fights by year ==
=== 1990 ===
- January 15 – George Foreman defeats Gerry Cooney by 2nd round TKO
- February 11 – Buster Douglas upsets Mike Tyson by 10th-round KO in Tokyo, to become the undisputed heavyweight champion of the world. Douglas was a 42–1 underdog.
- March 17 – Thunder Meets Lightning: Julio César Chávez defeats Meldrick Taylor by 12th-round KO, for the WBC-IBF light welterweight unification. There was controversy as referee Richard Steele stops the contest with 2 seconds left in the bout and Taylor ahead on the scorecards.
- March 31 – Terry Norris defeats John Mugabi to win WBC light middleweight title
- April 14 – Michael Nunn defeats Marlon Starling by majority decision to retain the IBF middleweight title
- April 28 – Thomas Hearns defeats Michael Olajide by unanimous decision to retain the WBO super middleweight title
- June 1 – Evander Holyfield defeats Seamus McDonagh by 4th round TKO
- June 16 – Mike Tyson defeats Henry Tillman by 1st round KO
  - George Foreman defeats Adilson Rodrigues by 2nd round KO
- August 11 – Pernell Whitaker defeats Juan Nazario by first-round knockout to unify the WBA, WBC, IBF belts and becomes the undisputed lightweight champion of the world.
- August 18 – Nigel Benn defeats Iran Barkley by 1st round KO to retain WBO middleweight title
- October 25 – Buster Douglas's short reign as heavyweight champion ends as he loses to Evander Holyfield by third-round KO. Douglas was very noticeably out of shape, despite being in pinnacle shape in the Tyson fight, eight months and two weeks before.
- November 11 – Julian Jackson wins by stunning knockout over Herol Graham by a devastating 4th-round KO for the vacated WBC middleweight title. Graham, ahead in the fight, was knocked out by Jackson by a devastating right hand and was out for five minutes.
- November 18 – Chris Eubank wins the WBO middleweight title by beating Nigel Benn by 9th round TKO.
- December 8 – Mike Tyson defeats Alex Stewart by 1st round TKO

=== 1991 ===
- January 19 – Meldrick Taylor defeats Aaron Davis by unanimous decision to win the WBA welterweight title.
- February 9 – Terry Norris soundly defeats Sugar Ray Leonard by 12-round unanimous decision, and successfully defends his WBC super welterweight title.
- March 8 - In Atlantic City, New Jersey, Tim Witherspoon defeats Carl Williams via a 12-round split decision to become the new USBA heavyweight champion.
- March 18 - Tyson vs Ruddock:
  - Mike Tyson defeats Donovan "Razor" Ruddock in the 7th round by TKO, but the decision is disputed by Ruddock's corner, leading to a rematch in July, which Tyson would also win.
  - On the undercard, Simon Brown stops Maurice Blocker in 10 rounds to unify the IBF/WBC welterweight titles, and Julio Cesar Chavez wins his 73rd consecutive fight against John Duplessis, retaining his WBC/IBF super lightweight titles.
- April 19 – in his first defense as undisputed heavyweight champion, Evander Holyfield defeats George Foreman by unanimous decision. Foreman was surprisingly valiant in defeat despite being 42 years of age.
- May 10 – James Toney defeats Michael Nunn by 11th round TKO to win the IBF middleweight title.
- June 1 – In Palm Springs, California, Terry Norris knocks out Donald Curry in the 8th round and successfully defends the WBC super welterweight championship.
- June 3 – Thomas Hearns defeats Virgil Hill by unanimous decision to win the WBA light heavyweight title.
- October 18 – Ray Mercer defeats Tommy Morrison by 5th round KO to defend the lightly regarded WBO title
- November 23 – Evander Holyfield defeats substitute Bert Cooper by 7th round TKO
  - Lennox Lewis defeats Tyrell Biggs by 3rd round TKO
- December 13 - James Toney fought Mike McCallum to a draw, Toney retained his IBF middleweight title.

=== 1992 ===
- January 18 – Meldrick Taylor overcomes two early knockdowns to successfully defend the WBA welterweight championship by unanimous decision against Glenwood Brown.
- February 7 – Larry Holmes defeats Ray Mercer by unanimous decision
- March 20 – Iran Barkley defeats Thomas Hearns by split decision in their rematch to win the WBA light heavyweight title
- April 11 – George Foreman defeats Alex Stewart by majority decision
  - James Toney defeats Glenn Wolfe by unanimous decision to retain the IBF and lineal middleweight title
- May 15 – Michael Moorer stops Bert Cooper in 5 rounds to become the new WBO Heavyweight champion.
- June 19 – Evander Holyfield successfully defends his undisputed heavyweight championship by unanimous decision over Larry Holmes.
- July 18 – In a WBA/IBF heavyweight title eliminator, Riddick Bowe defeats Pierre Coetzer by 7th round TKO
  - Pernell Whitaker defeats Rafael Pineda by 7th round TKO to win IBF light welterweight title
- September 12 – Julio César Chávez defeats Héctor Camacho by unanimous decision to retain the WBA light welterweight title.
  - Michael Nunn defeats Víctor Córdoba by split decision to win the WBA super middleweight title.
- October 31 – Lennox Lewis stops Donovan Ruddock in the 2nd round in a WBC heavyweight title eliminator.
  - Crisanto Espana stops Meldrick Taylor in 8 rounds to win the WBA Welterweight championship.
- November 13 – Riddick Bowe defeats Evander Holyfield by 12-round unanimous decision to become the undisputed champion of the world.

=== 1993 ===
- February 6 – Riddick Bowe makes his first successful defense of the WBA/IBF heavyweight titles against former champion Michael Dokes.
- March 13 – Michael Carbajal wins by KO against Humberto González to unify the IBF and WBC Flyweight belts. Carbajal got knocked down twice during the fight and came back to knock out Gonzalez late in the seventh round.
- May 22 – Roy Jones Jr. defeats Bernard Hopkins by unanimous decision to win the vacated IBF middleweight title.
- September 10 – Julio César Chávez and Pernell Whitaker's fight for the WBC welterweight title ends in a controversial draw, despite Whitaker seemingly dominating the fight.
- October 1 – Lennox Lewis beats Frank Bruno in the seventh round by a technical knockout. Lewis was defending his WBC Heavyweight title. It was the first time that two British-born boxers had fought for the world heavyweight title.
- November 6 – Evander Holyfield defeats Riddick Bowe by majority decision in their rematch for the WBA and IBF heavyweight titles. A man parachutes to the corner of the ring during the fight and starts a mini riot, the fight is later labelled the Fan Man Fight.

=== 1994 ===
- January 29 – Frankie Randall causes Julio César Chávez his first defeat in 91 professional bouts, winning the WBC world Jr. Welterweight title in the process, by a split decision in 12 rounds.
- April 22 – Michael Moorer defeats Evander Holyfield to win the Lineal, WBA & IBF Heavyweight Championship
- May 7 – Revenge: The Rematches:
  - Julio Cesar Chavez avenges his loss to Frankie Randall via technical decision after 8 rounds to regain the WBC super lightweight championship.
  - Gerald McClellan defeats Julian Jackson via 1st round KO to retain the WBC middleweight championship.
  - Terry Norris defeats Simon Brown in their rematch to win the WBC super welterweight championship.
  - After drawing in their first fight, Jesse James Leija defeats Azumah Nelson via unanimous decision to win the WBC super featherweight championship.
- September 24 – Lennox Lewis loses his WBC championship and undefeated record after getting knocked out by Oliver McCall in front of his home crowd in London
- November 5 – George Foreman at 45 years old becomes the oldest heavyweight champion defeating Michael Moorer by knockout in round 10, with Foreman behind in all the scorecards.
- November 18 – Roy Jones Jr. defeats James Toney by a lopsided unanimous decision to win the IBF super middleweight championship

=== 1995 ===
- February 15 – Nigel Benn defeats Gerald McClellan by a tenth round TKO for the WBC super middleweight title after being knocked through the ropes in the first round, and knocked down again in the eighth round. McClellan is counted on his knees, then loses consciousness in the ring and is transported to hospital, where he falls into a coma and suffers extensive brain damage, losing his eyesight and becoming 80 percent deaf.
- May 6 – Oscar De La Hoya unifies the WBO and IBF Lightweight titles in his victory against Rafael Ruelas, to win his first major title.
- August 19 – Mike Tyson defeats Peter McNeeley in his first comeback fight.
- October 7 Lennox Lewis defeats Tommy Morrison in 6th round to win the IBC Heavyweight title
- November 4 – Riddick Bowe knockouts Evander Holyfield in the 8th round of their rubber match.

=== 1996 ===
- March 16 – Mike Tyson defeats Frank Bruno by third round KO to win the WBC heavyweight title.
- June 7 – Oscar De La Hoya defeats Julio César Chávez by fourth round KO to win the WBC light welterweight title.
- July 11 – Andrew Golota gets disqualified during the seventh round of a fight against Riddick Bowe at Madison Square Garden for striking low blows against Bowe. A massive riot ensues, in which many civilians are injured.
- September 7 – Mike Tyson defeats Bruce Seldon in one round for the WBA heavyweight title, unifying it with the WBC heavyweight title he already holds. Tupac Shakur, an American rapper, watched the fight but was fatally shot later on that night. He died 6 days later.
- September 24 – Mike Tyson is stripped of the WBC heavyweight title.
- November 9 – Evander Holyfield wins by technical knockout against Mike Tyson to win the WBA heavyweight title.
- December 14 – Andrew Golota gets disqualified again against Riddick Bowe for low blows in their rematch.

=== 1997 ===
- February 7 – Lennox Lewis regains the now vacant WBC heavyweight title against his only conqueror Oliver McCall, in a bizarre bout, where McCall refuses to fight after the third round and begins to cry in the ring forcing the referee to stop the fight in the fifth round
- March 1 – Sugar Ray Leonard returns to the ring after a six-year layoff at the age of 41, but loses a fifth round TKO against Héctor Camacho and retires for good after the fight.
- March 21 – Roy Jones Jr. loses his WBC light heavyweight title by disqualification to Montell Griffin for hitting after the fighter was down, suffering the first loss in his career, Jones Jr. was behind on two score cards.
- April 12 – Oscar De La Hoya defeats Pernell Whitaker by unanimous decision to win the Lineal & WBC Welterweight Championship
- June 28 – Evander Holyfield wins by disqualification over Mike Tyson, after Tyson bites Holyfield's ear twice.
- August 7 – Roy Jones Jr. regains his WBC light heavyweight title by first-round knockout in his rematch against Montell Griffin.
- October 4 - Arturo Gatti defeats Gabriel Ruelas by fifth round knockout to retain his IBF Super Featherweight Championship, and Lennox Lewis defeats Andrew Golota by first round knockout to retain his WBC Heavyweight Championship
- November 8 - Evander Holyfield defeats Michael Moorer in their rematch by 8th round knockout, unifying the WBA and IBF Heavyweight Championship
- December 19 - Naseem Hamed defeats Kevin Kelley by fourth round knockout to retain his WBO Featherweight Championship

=== 1998 ===
- March 28 - Lennox Lewis defeats Shannon Briggs by fifth round knockout to retain his WBC Heavyweight Championship and win the Lineal title
- April 18 – WBO titleholder Naseem Hamed defeats Wilfredo Vázquez to win the Lineal Featherweight Championship
- April 25 – Roy Jones Jr. defeats fellow former light heavyweight champion Virgil Hill by 4th round KO
- June 13 – Oscar De La Hoya defeats Patrick Charpentier by 3rd round TKO to retain the WBC welterweight title
- July 18 - Roy Jones Jr defeats Lou Del Valle by unanimous decision to win the WBA Light Heavyweight Championship
- August 22 - Ivan Robinson defeats Arturo Gatti by split decision. The fight was named Fight of the Year by Ring Magazine
- August 28 - William Joppy defeats Roberto Durán by 3rd round TKO to retain the WBA middleweight title
- September 18 - Oscar De La Hoya defeats Patrick Charpentier by 8th round RTD to retain the WBC welterweight title in their rematch
- September 19 - Evander Holyfield defeats Vaughn Bean by unanimous decision to retain the WBA and IBF heavyweight titles
- September 26 - Lennox Lewis defeats Željko Mavrović by unanimous decision to retain the WBC and Lineal heavyweight titles
- October 3 - Floyd Mayweather Jr., aged 21, defeats Genaro Hernández to win the Lineal & WBC Super featherweight titles, becoming the first 1996 U.S. Olympian to win a world title.
- October 31 - Naseem Hamed defeats Wayne McCullough by a unanimous decision to retain the Lineal and WBO featherweight titles
- November 6 - After being absent for nearly two years, Thomas Hearns was back in the ring in his hometown of Detroit, Michigan to knock out Jay Snider in Round one.
- November 14 - Roy Jones Jr. defeats Otis Grant by 10th round TKO to retain the WBA and WBC light heavyweight titles
- December 5 - Journeyman Ross Puritty upsets Wladimir Klitschko by 11th stoppage.
- December 12 - Fernando Vargas at 21 years of age, defeats Yori Boy Campas to win the IBF light middleweight title, and Ivan Robinson defeats Arturo Gatti in their rematch by unanimous decision
- December 19 - Floyd Mayweather Jr defeats Angel Manfredy by second round knockout to retained his WBC & Lineal Super Featherweight Championship, and David Tua defeats Hasim Rahman by tenth round knockout IBF Heavyweight eliminator

=== 1999 ===
- March 13 – WBA and IBF champion Evander Holyfield and WBC champion Lennox Lewis meet in a unification heavyweight bout at Madison Square Garden, but the fight ends in a controversial draw.
- June 5 – Roy Jones Jr. defeats Reggie Johnson and successfully unifies the light heavyweight division becoming the unified champion of the division.
- September 18 – in what was billed as the Fight of the millennium, Félix Trinidad defeats Oscar De La Hoya by a close, controversial majority decision. The fight generated 1.4 million pay per view buys, generating a record for a non-heavyweight fight.
- November 13 – Lennox Lewis becomes the undisputed heavyweight champion of the world in his rematch against Evander Holyfield by unanimous decision.
- December 4 - Fernando Vargas defeats Winky Wright by majority decision to retain his IBF Light Middleweight Championship
