= Meldrick Taylor vs. Glenwood Brown =

Boxing match

- Date: January 18, 1992
- Venue: Philadelphia Civic Center, Philadelphia, Pennsylvania, U.S.
- Title(s) on the line: WBA welterweight title

Tale of the tape
Boxer	Meldrick Taylor	Glenwood Brown
Nickname	TNT	The Real Beast
Hometown	Philadelphia, Pennsylvania, U.S.	Plainfield, New Jersey, U.S.
Pre-fight record	28–1–1 (15 KO)	34–2 (24 KO)
Age	25 years, 2 months	24 years, 5 months
Height	5 ft 6 1/2 in (169 cm)	5 ft 7 1/2 in (171 cm)
Weight	146 1/4 lb (66 kg)	146 1/2 lb (66 kg)
Style	Orthodox	Orthodox
Recognition	WBA; Welterweight Champion; The Ring; No. 1 Ranked Welterweight; The Ring No. 3 ranked pound-for-pound fighter	WBA; No. 2 Ranked Welterweight; The Ring; No. 6 Ranked Welterweight

Result
- Taylor wins via unanimous decision (116–113, 116–113, 114–113)

Meldrick Taylor vs. Glenwood Brown was a professional boxing match contested on January 18, 1992, for the WBA welterweight title. The fight took place at the Philadelphia Civic Center in Taylor's native Philadelphia, Pennsylvania. The featured undercard bout saw Taylor's friend and stablemate Pernell Whitaker, who was coming off a stint as the undisputed lightweight champion, making his super lightweight debut against former contender Harold Brazier.

== Fight Details ==
Taylor overcame a slow start and early knockdowns and rallied to earn a unanimous decision victory. Taylor was outboxing Brown in the first round before Brown countered a wild Taylor left and connected with a left hook that sent Taylor down on the seat of his pants in the final seconds of the round, though he quickly got back up and did not appear to be seriously hurt by the blow. Taylor won the second round, but Brown rebounded to take the third and fourth, scoring a second knockdown during the final 30 seconds of the round when a right hand sent Taylor momentarily off-balance and caused his gloves to touch the mat. The two fighters traded rounds five and sixth with Brown holding a lead on two of the judge's scorecards at the midway point of fight. However, after six rounds of brawling, Taylor controlled the majority of the remaining rounds and easily outboxed Brown, who fought passively and without much of the aggression he had fought with during the earlier rounds. With the fight going the full 12 rounds, the decision was left to the judges, all of whom had Taylor the winner with two scores of 116–113 and one score of 114–113.

Brown, however, disagreed with the decision, stating after the fight "I got robbed in that fight. I kept the pressure on. He landed flurries but I landed more solid shots."

== Fight card ==
Confirmed bouts:

Weight Class	Weight		vs.		Method	Round	Notes
Welterweight	147 lbs.	Meldrick Taylor (c)	def.	Glenwood Brown	UD	12/12	^{note 1}
Super Lightweight	140 lbs.	Pernell Whitaker	def.	Harold Brazier	UD	10/10
Welterweight	147 lbs.	Rodney Moore	def.	Tony Baltazar	SD	10/10
Welterweight	147 lbs.	Nick Rupa	def.	Joseph Alexander	PTS	8/8
Super Middleweight	168 lbs.	Tim Littles	def.	Willie Douglas	PTS	6/6
Super Welterweight	154 lbs.	Derrell Coley	def.	Eric Holland	PTS	4/4

^Note 1 For WBA Welterweight Title

== Broadcasting ==
Country	Broadcaster
United States	HBO

Preceded by vs. Ernie Chavez	Meldrick Taylor's bouts 18 January 1992	Succeeded by vs. Terry Norris
Preceded by vs. Maurice Blocker	Glenwood Brown's bouts 18 January 1992	Succeeded by vs. Miguel Santana
