= Razor Ruddock =

"Razor" Ruddock is a nickname. Notable people with the nickname include:

- Donovan Ruddock (born 1963), Canadian boxer
- Neil Ruddock (born 1968), English footballer
