= Luis Santana (boxer) =

Dominican Republic boxer

Personal information
- Nickname: Cucuso
- Nationality: Dominican
- Born: November 19, 1958 (age 67) La Romana, Dominican Republic
- Height: 5 ft 9 in (175 cm)
- Weight: Welterweight; Light middleweight

Boxing career
- Reach: 67 3/4 in (172 cm)
- Stance: Orthodox

Boxing record
- Total fights: 61
- Wins: 42
- Win by KO: 31
- Losses: 17
- Draws: 2

Luis Santana (born November 19, 1958, in La Romana, Dominican Republic), is a retired professional boxer who fought in the super welterweight (154lb) division. He was the World Boxing Council's world Super Welterweight champion.

== Career ==
Santana turned pro in 1981 and challenged Simon Brown for the IBF Welterweight Title in 1989, but lost a unanimous decision.

In 1994 he got another title shot against WBC Light Middleweight Title holder Terry Norris and won the title when Norris was disqualified in the 5th round for downing Santana with an illegal blow to the back of the head or rabbit punch. After a lengthy delay, the ringside doctor ruled Santana unable to continue. Norris, along with some media members, believed that Santana was faking the injury in order to win the championship and presumably, a rematch fight with Norris. In 1995 they fought a rematch, and again Norris was disqualified for hitting Santana after the bell to end Round 3 had sounded. Later that year they again rematched, and Norris dominated the fight, winning by 2nd-round TKO.

== Professional boxing record ==
61 fights	42 wins	17 losses
By knockout	31	5
By decision	9	12
By disqualification	2	0
Draws	2	

No.	Result	Record	Opponent	Type	Round, time	Date	Location	Notes
61	Loss	42–17–2	Sam Garr	TKO	10 (?)	1999-06-24	Atlanta, Georgia, U.S.	
60	Win	42–16–2	Jose Concepcion	TKO	2 (?)	1998-12-11	Saint Thomas, U.S. Virgin Islands	
59	Win	41–16–2	Kevin Sedam	TKO	2 (?)	1995-10-17	Pepsi Coliseum, Indianapolis, Indiana, U.S.	
58	Loss	40–16–2	Terry Norris	TKO	2 (12)	1995-08-19	MGM Grand Garden Arena, Las Vegas, Nevada, U.S.	Lost WBC super welterweight title
57	Win	40–15–2	Terry Norris	DQ	3 (12)	1995-04-08	Caesars Palace, Paradise, Nevada, U.S.	Retained WBC super welterweight title
56	Win	39–15–2	Terry Norris	DQ	5 (12)	1994-11-12	Plaza de Toros México, Mexico City, Mexico	Won WBC super welterweight title
55	Win	38–15–2	Ronnie Gibbons	TKO	5 (?)	1993-11-12	Hotel Pennsylvania, New York City, New York, U.S.	
54	Win	37–15–2	Johnny Bizzarro	PTS	10 (10)	1993-05-02	Erie, Pennsylvania, U.S.	
53	Loss	36–15–2	Vinny Paz	UD	10 (10)	1992-12-15	Foxwoods Resort Casino, Mashantucket, Connecticut, U.S.	
52	Loss	36–14–2	Crisanto España	UD	12 (12)	1991-02-12	Maysfield Leisure Centre, Belfast, Northern Ireland, U.K.	
51	Loss	36–13–2	Glenwood Brown	TKO	8 (12)	1990-02-20	Trump Plaza Hotel and Casino, Atlantic City, New Jersey, U.S.	
50	Loss	36–12–2	Simon Brown	UD	12 (12)	1989-11-09	Civic Center, Springfield, Massachusetts, U.S.	For IBF welterweight title
49	Win	36–11–2	Jorge Maysonet	UD	10 (10)	1989-09-25	Harrah's Marina Hotel Casino, Atlantic City, New Jersey, U.S.	
48	Loss	35–11–2	Vincent Pettway	UD	10 (10)	1989-06-05	The Blue Horizon, Philadelphia, Pennsylvania, U.S.	
47	Loss	35–10–2	Aaron Davis	UD	12 (12)	1989-04-13	Felt Forum, New York City, New York, U.S.	
46	Loss	35–9–2	Derrick Kelly	UD	12 (12)	1989-01-30	Forum, Inglewood, California, U.S.	Lost NABF welterweight title
45	Draw	35–8–2	Louis Howard	SD	12 (12)	1988-09-27	Riverboat Admiral, Saint Louis, Missouri, U.S.	Retained NABF welterweight title
44	Win	35–8–1	Graylin Curry	TKO	4 (10)	1988-07-02	Showboat Hotel and Casino, Las Vegas, Nevada, U.S.	
43	Win	34–8–1	Joe Garcia	TKO	2 (12)	1988-06-18	El Tianguis Shopping Center, Guadalupe, Arizona, U.S.	Retained NABF welterweight title
42	Loss	33–8–1	Royan Hammond	SD	10 (10)	1988-03-12	Showboat Hotel and Casino, Las Vegas, Nevada, U.S.	
41	Win	33–7–1	Roderick Starks	TKO	2 (10)	1988-02-12	Showboat Hotel and Casino, Las Vegas, Nevada, U.S.	
40	Win	32–7–1	Shawn O'Sullivan	TKO	11 (12)	1988-01-08	Bally's, Paradise, Nevada, U.S.	Won vacant NABF welterweight title
39	Loss	31–7–1	Derrick Kelly	UD	10 (10)	1987-11-03	Forum, Inglewood, California, U.S.	
38	Win	31–6–1	Ali Salaam	KO	9 (10)	1987-07-27	Forum, Inglewood, California, U.S.	
37	Loss	30–6–1	Darrin Van Horn	UD	10 (10)	1987-06-21	Continental Inn, Lexington, Kentucky, U.S.	
36	Loss	30–5–1	Tommy Ayers	TKO	4 (12)	1987-03-05	Showboat Hotel and Casino, Las Vegas, Nevada, U.S.	Lost NABF welterweight title
35	Win	30–4–1	Allen Braswell	TKO	9 (12)	1986-11-07	Caesars Tahoe, Cascade Showroom, Stateline, Nevada, U.S.	Won vacant NABF welterweight title
34	Win	29–4–1	Kenny Lopez	TKO	4 (10)	1986-09-04	Hyatt Regency Convention Center, Oakland, California, U.S.	
33	Win	28–4–1	Tomas Perez	UD	10 (10)	1986-08-05	Showboat Hotel and Casino, Las Vegas, Nevada, U.S.	
32	Win	27–4–1	Manning Galloway	TD	8 (10)	1986-06-25	Forum, Inglewood, California, U.S.	
31	Loss	26–4–1	Nathan Dryer	MD	10 (10)	1986-02-17	Graham Central Station, Phoenix, Arizona, U.S.	
30	Loss	26–3–1	Milton McCrory	TKO	3 (10)	1985-05-26	James L. Knight Center, Miami Beach, Florida, U.S.	
29	Win	26–2–1	Darrell Chambers	TKO	3 (8)	1985-04-15	Caesars Palace, Outdoor Arena, Paradise, Nevada, U.S.	
28	Win	25–2–1	Gary Baca	TKO	7 (10)	1985-02-12	Celebrity Theatre, Phoenix, Arizona, U.S.	
27	Win	24–2–1	Noe Ramirez	TKO	2 (10)	1985-01-10	Caesars Tahoe, Stateline, Nevada, U.S.	
26	Win	23–2–1	Glenn Corbus	TKO	2 (10)	1984-11-28	Showboat Hotel and Casino, Las Vegas, Nevada, U.S.	
25	Win	22–2–1	Dennis Horne	TKO	4 (10)	1984-09-27	Showboat Hotel and Casino, Sports Pavilion, Las Vegas, Nevada, U.S.	
24	Win	21–2–1	Felipe Canela	SD	10 (10)	1984-07-12	Showboat Hotel and Casino, Sports Pavilion, Las Vegas, Nevada, U.S.	
23	Loss	20–2–1	Reggie Miller	UD	10 (10)	1984-04-12	Riviera Hotel & Casino, SuperStar Center, Winchester, Nevada, U.S.	
22	Win	20–1–1	Art Geronimo	TKO	4 (10)	1984-03-30	Riviera Hotel & Casino, SuperStar Center, Winchester, Nevada, U.S.	
21	Win	19–1–1	Brian Matthews	UD	10 (10)	1984-03-05	Graham Central Station, Phoenix, Arizona, U.S.	
20	Win	18–1–1	Jesus Gonzalez	KO	2 (4)	1983-11-10	Caesars Palace, Paradise, Nevada, U.S.	
19	Win	17–1–1	Agapito Ramirez	UD	6 (6)	1983-10-25	Showboat Hotel and Casino, Sports Pavilion, Las Vegas, Nevada, U.S.	
18	Win	16–1–1	Miguel Mayan	UD	8 (8)	1983-06-30	Showboat Hotel and Casino, Sports Pavilion, Las Vegas, Nevada, U.S.	
17	Loss	15–1–1	Brian Matthews	PTS	8 (8)	1983-05-10	Phoenix, Arizona, U.S.	
16	Win	15–0–1	Manny Valenzuela	KO	1 (8)	1983-04-21	Showboat Hotel and Casino, Sports Pavilion, Las Vegas, Nevada, U.S.	
15	Win	14–0–1	Doug James	KO	3 (?)	1983-03-31	Olympic Auditorium, Los Angeles, California, U.S.	
14	Win	13–0–1	Joe Molière	TKO	7 (8)	1983-03-10	Showboat Hotel and Casino, Las Vegas, Nevada, U.S.	
13	Win	12–0–1	Dave Marsala	TKO	1 (6)	1983-02-19	Showboat Hotel and Casino, Las Vegas, Nevada, U.S.	
12	Win	11–0–1	Harry Truman	TKO	3 (8)	1982-11-25	Showboat Hotel and Casino, Sports Pavilion, Las Vegas, Nevada, U.S.	
11	Win	10–0–1	Chuck Peralta	TKO	4 (6)	1982-11-13	Caesars Palace, Paradise, Nevada, U.S.	
10	Win	9–0–1	Randy Holmes	TKO	1 (6)	1982-10-21	Showboat Hotel and Casino, Sports Pavilion, Las Vegas, Nevada, U.S.	
9	Win	8–0–1	Chuck Peralta	UD	6 (6)	1982-09-23	Showboat Hotel and Casino, Sports Pavilion, Las Vegas, Nevada, U.S.	
8	Win	7–0–1	John Herbert	TKO	6 (6)	1982-09-02	Olympic Auditorium, Los Angeles, California, U.S.	
7	Win	6–0–1	Willie Paul	TKO	1 (6)	1982-08-19	Showboat Hotel and Casino, Sports Pavilion, Las Vegas, Nevada, U.S.	
6	Win	5–0–1	Charles LaCour	KO	6 (6)	1982-07-08	Olympic Auditorium, Los Angeles, California, U.S.	
5	Win	4–0–1	Charles Williams	TKO	1 (?)	1982-07-01	Showboat Hotel and Casino, Sports Pavilion, Las Vegas, Nevada, U.S.	
4	Win	3–0–1	Jose Luis Cardenas	KO	2 (?)	1982-06-19	Hacienda Hotel, Paradise, Nevada, U.S.	
3	Draw	2–0–1	Mike Ruelas	PTS	4 (4)	1982-05-23	Caesars Palace, Sports Pavilion, Paradise, Nevada, U.S.	
2	Win	2–0	Don Estridge	TKO	2 (6)	1982-05-04	Caesars Palace, Sports Pavilion, Paradise, Nevada, U.S.	
1	Win	1–0	Ernesto Herrera	KO	4 (6)	1981-12-03	Olympic Auditorium, Los Angeles, California, U.S.	

== See also ==
- List of world light-middleweight boxing champions

Sporting positions
Regional boxing titles
Vacant Title last held by Maurice Blocker	NABF welterweight champion November 7, 1986 – March 5, 1987	Succeeded by Tommy Ayers
Vacant Title last held by Tommy Ayers	NABF welterweight champion January 8, 1988 – January 30, 1989	Succeeded by Derrick Kelly
World boxing titles
Preceded by Terry Norris	WBC super welterweight champion November 12, 1994 – August 19, 1995	Succeeded by Terry Norris
