= Terry Norris vs. Meldrick Taylor =

Boxing match

- Date: May 9, 1992
- Venue: The Mirage, Paradise, Nevada, U.S.
- Title(s) on the line: WBC light middleweight title

Tale of the tape
| Boxer | Terry Norris | Meldrick Taylor |
| Nickname | Terrible | TNT |
| Hometown | Lubbock, Texas, U.S. | Philadelphia, Pennsylvania, U.S. |
| Purse | $1,300,000 | $1,000,000 |
| Pre-fight record | 31–3 (17 KO) | 29–1–1 (15 KO) |
| Age | 24 years, 10 months | 25 years, 6 months |
| Height | 5 ft 9 in (175 cm) | 5 ft 6 1/2 in (169 cm) |
| Weight | 149 lb (68 kg) | 149 lb (68 kg) |
| Style | Orthodox | Orthodox |
| Recognition | WBC; Light Middleweight Champion; The Ring; No. 1 Ranked Light Middleweight; The Ring No. 7 ranked pound-for-pound fighter | WBA; Welterweight Champion; The Ring; No. 1 Ranked Welterweight; The Ring No. 3 ranked pound-for-pound fighter 2-division world champion |

Result
- Norris wins via 4th-round technical knockout

Terry Norris vs. Meldrick Taylor was a professional boxing match contested on May 9, 1992, for the WBC super welterweight title.

== Background ==
A fight between WBC super welterweight champion Terry Norris and WBA welterweight champion Meldrick Taylor had been in the works for nearly a year. On June 1, 1991, Norris and Taylor co-headlined a boxing card in which the two fighters successfully defended their titles against Donald Curry and Luis Garcia respectively. After the event, Norris' manager Joe Sayatovich explicitly stated that he and Norris were interested in facing Taylor, telling the media "we're looking for somebody to fight who is credible. We want Meldrick Taylor." However, as Taylor had only recently moved up from the 140-pound light welterweight division to the 147-pound welterweight division and Norris fought at the 154-pound super welterweight limit, Taylor's manager Dan Duva denied that Taylor would be able to face Norris 154 pounds stating that Taylor was "barely a welterweight. If Terry Norris wants to fight at 147, then we'll talk." With a Norris–Taylor fight not happening for the time being, Norris and Taylor would continue with their respective careers, but with pressure from Norris due to receiving big money fights, Sayatovich struck a deal with Duva in early March 1992 that would see Norris and Taylor meet on May 9, 1992, at The Mirage in the Las Vegas Valley.

In an effort to split the difference between their respective normal weight classes, Taylor's camp successfully negotiated a catchweight of 150.5 pounds, exactly midway between the welterweight and super welterweight divisions. Though Norris had to shed pounds from his normal fighting weight, he remained unconcerned as he was still naturally larger than Taylor, he stated "I'm much bigger and much stronger (than Taylor). He has nothing to hold me off with."

Norris was a 2–1 favourite to win.

== Fight Details ==
Though Taylor got off to a decent start in the opening round and was able to win the round on two of the judge's scorecards, Norris quickly took control in the second round as his superior size and power overwhelmed the outmatched Taylor. One minute into the fourth round, a Norris combination sent Taylor down to knees. Taylor answered referee Mills Lane's 10-count at seven and was allowed to continue, but after attempting to hold Norris off by swinging wildly, was hit by several big shots to the head and backed into the ropes. Though clearly hurt, Taylor continued to trade punches with Norris before Norris landed two rights flush to Taylor's head that again sent him to his knees. Taylor again arose and was allowed to continue but was quickly met by a barrage from Norris, who wobbled Taylor with straight right to head. Having felt that Taylor could not continue, Lane stopped the fight with five second remaining, giving Norris the victory by technical knockout.

== Fight card ==
Confirmed bouts:

| Weight Class | Weight | | vs. | | Method | Round | Notes |
|---|---|---|---|---|---|---|---|
| Catchweight | 150.5 lbs. | Terry Norris (c) | def. | Meldrick Taylor | TKO | 4/12 | ^{note 1} |
Preliminary bouts
| Super Featherweight | 130 lbs. | Eddie Hopson | def. | Robert Byrd | KO | 3/8 |
| Heavyweight | 200+ lbs. | Corrie Sanders | def. | Mike Dixon | UD | 8/8 |
| Super Lightweight | 140 lbs. | George Scott | def. | Jerry Perez | UD | 6/6 |
| Featherweight | 126 lbs. | Yūichi Kasai | def. | Jose Manjarrez | MD | 6/6 |
| Super Lightweight | 140 lbs. | Robert Hightower | def. | Jose Jimenez | UD | 4/4 |

^Note 1 For WBC Super Welterweight Title

== Broadcasting ==
| Country | Broadcaster |
|---|---|
| United States | HBO |

| Preceded by vs. Carl Daniels | Terry Norris's bouts 9 May 1992 | Succeeded by vs. Pat Lawlor |
| Preceded by vs. Glenwood Brown | Meldrick Taylor's bouts 9 May 1992 | Succeeded by vs. Crisanto España |
