= Mike Tyson vs. Donovan Ruddock II =

Boxing match

The Rematch
- Date: June 28, 1991
- Venue: The Mirage, Paradise, Nevada, U.S.

Tale of the tape
Boxer	Mike Tyson	Donovan Ruddock
Nickname	Iron	Razor
Hometown	Catskill, New York, U.S.	Toronto, Ontario, Canada
Pre-fight record	40–1 (36 KO)	25–2–1 (18 KO)
Age	24 years, 11 months	27 years, 6 months
Height	5 ft 10 in (178 cm)	6 ft 3 in (191 cm)
Weight	216 lb (98 kg)	238 lb (108 kg)
Style	Orthodox	Orthodox
Recognition	WBA/WBC/IBF; No. 1 Ranked Heavyweight; The Ring; No. 2 Ranked Heavyweight; The Ring No. 5 ranked pound-for-pound fighter Former undisputed heavyweight champion	WBA/WBC/IBF; No. 2 Ranked Heavyweight; The Ring; No. 3 Ranked Heavyweight

Result
- Tyson wins via 12-round unanimous decision (113-109, 114-108, 114-108)

Mike Tyson vs. Donovan Ruddock II, billed as The Rematch, was a professional boxing match contested on 28 June 1991. It was the second time the two fighters fought that year, as their first bout in March was mired in controversy.

The fight took place at the same venue the first one had, The Mirage in Paradise, Nevada, USA. As before, it was scheduled for twelve rounds and was a championship elimination fight with the winner becoming the mandatory top challenger for the undisputed world championship that was then held by Evander Holyfield.

Tyson emerged victorious once again, this time defeating Ruddock by unanimous decision and solidifying his position as the number one contender.

== Background ==
In the first fight between the two, controversy erupted in the seventh round. After Tyson hit Ruddock with a six-punch combination, referee Richard Steele stepped in and stopped the fight despite the fact the Ruddock had not been knocked down and appeared to be healthy enough to continue. This was the second time a Steele stoppage had caused controversy in twelve months. In the previous year, Steele served as referee for a world super lightweight title fight between Julio César Chávez and Meldrick Taylor. With the fight entering its final round, Taylor was winning on two judges’ scorecards but had taken a significant amount of physical punishment. Chavez eventually dropped Taylor in the final twenty seconds of the twelfth round, and even though Taylor made it to his feet, Steele called a halt to the contest two seconds shy of its completion after Taylor did not respond to him and Chavez won by technical knockout.

After the fight was stopped, Ruddock's brother Delroy and his promoter Murad Muhammad got into a physical confrontation with Tyson's trainer Richie Giachetti while Steele had to be escorted to the back by Mirage security for his safety. Nine days after the fight, Tyson's promoter Don King and Muhammad struck a deal for a rematch to settle any controversy over the outcome of the initial bout.

However, a decision by the Nevada Athletic Commission nearly resulted in the fight getting scuttled. After an investigation into the postfight brawl, Muhammad was handed a twelve-month suspension for his actions. Ruddock decided not to participate if Muhammad was not able to and thus he announced he would not take the fight. Nevertheless, Muhammad announced that the fight was back on 10 days later.

Prior to the fight, the two men publicly expressed their dislike for one another. At a press conference before the fight, Tyson infamously stated that he would make Ruddock his "girlfriend".

== Undercard ==
On the undercard, WBC No. 1 ranked middleweight Dennis Milton scored a 2nd TKO over Pat Brennan in a 10-round super middleweight bout.

=== Bowe vs. Marin ===
The first televised bout saw unbeaten heavyweight contender Riddick Bowe (23–0, 20 KOs; IBF's No. 5, WBC and WBA's No. 7) face Rodolfo Marin in a scheduled 10 round bout.

==== The fight ====
Bowe knocked out Marin with an overhand right hook in the 2nd round, breaking Marin's jaw in the process. Referee Carlos Padilla Jr. counted Marin out at 1:45 round.

==== Aftermath ====
Speaking after the bout Bowe said "I knew it was just a matter of time, and I just tried to stay relaxed and focused. Marin went 10 rounds with Tyrell Biggs, so I think this says a lot for my punching power. The right behind the ear shook him up. He tried to duck it, but I finished him with the uppercut. I said before the fight that he was too slow for me and I'd knock him out. I wasn't just boasting."

His trainer Eddie Futch was also satisfied saying "I see improvement in Riddick every day. He has a lot of qualities that remind me of Larry Holmes, but others that are strictly Bowe."

There was also talk in the aftermath that if discussions for a Holyfield-Tyson bout fell through, Bowe would be the next opponent for Tyson.

Preceded by vs. Tony Tubbs	Riddick Bowe's bouts 28 June 1991	Succeeded by vs. Philipp Brown
Preceded by vs. Tyrell Biggs	Rodolfo Marin's bouts 28 June 1991	Succeeded by vs. Miguel Otero

=== Nelson vs. Fenech ===
The Rematch: Azumah Nelson vs. Jeff Fenech
- Title(s) on the line: WBC super featherweight title

Tale of the tape
Boxer	(Ghana) Azumah Nelson	(Australia) Jeff Fenech
Nickname	"The Mighty Warrior"	"Marrickville Mauler"
Hometown	Accra, Ghana	Sydney, New South Wales, Australia
Pre-fight record	33–2 (25 KO)	25–0 (19 KO)
Age	32 years, 11 months	27 years, 1 month
Height	5 ft 5 in (165 cm)	5 ft 7 in (170 cm)
Weight	129 3/4 lb (59 kg)	128 3/4 lb (58 kg)
Style	Orthodox	Orthodox
Recognition	WBC; Super Featherweight Champion	WBC; No. 1 Ranked Super Featherweight; 3-division world champion

Result
- Split draw

The only world title bout on the card saw WBC Super Featherweight Champion Azumah Nelson face former 3 division champion Jeff Fenech.

==== The fight ====
The bout was marked by toe-to-toe exchanges as Nelson often went to the ropes giving as good as he got. In the 3rd round he opened up a gash over Fenech's left eye, as the challenger kept Nelson pinned to the ropes. Fenech threw more punches but Nelson was more accurate. Fenech's continued attacks appeared to slow down the champion during the middle rounds as his cornermen managed to stem the flow of blood from the gash.

In round 9 Nelson changed tactics, opting to jab and move the charging Fenech, however as the round progressed he switched back to his usual counter-punching style. At the end of the 9th Nelson caught Fenech with a left hook well after the bell had sounded drawing a warning from referee Joe Cortez. There was a minute's delay before the start of the 10th as Nelson's corner had misplaced his mouthpiece. As the fight neared its climax Fenech hurt Nelson badly with a right hand to the head followed up with two more right hands, and then just before the bell he staggered Nelson with another right to the head leaving the champion seemingly out on his feet.

When the judges scorecards were read, Jerry Roth had Fenech ahead 115–113, Miguel Donate scored it 116–112 for Nelson and Dave Moretti of Las Vegas it even 114–114, thus the bout was a split draw and Nelson retained his WBC Super Featherweight title for the sixth time.

The LA Times scored it 118–110 for Fenech, while the Associated Press had it 114–114.

==== Aftermath ====
The judges' decision was booed by the audience and many of the boxing press who were present claimed that Fenech had been robbed of a clear win, with Showtime commentator Steve Albert describing it as "mind-boggling".

Because of the controversy the WBC ordered a rematch with its president Jose Sulaiman saying "This was without a doubt a tremendous controversy" however he refused to overturn the decision "I believe in the integrity of all our referees and the decision will stand."

On 7 November 2022 the WBC awarded the title to Fenech retrospectively after a recount, granting him fourth world title.

Preceded by vs. Daniyal Mustapha Ennin	Azumah Nelson's bouts 28 June 1991	Succeeded by Rematch
Preceded by vs. John Kalbhenn	Jeff Fenech's bouts 28 June 1991	Succeeded by vs. Miguel Angel Francia

== Main event ==
In a hard-fought match that went the distance, Tyson ultimately picked up the victory via unanimous decision with all three judges ruling in his favor with one score of 113–109 and two scores of 114–108. Tyson got off to a strong start in round 1. With 16 seconds left in the round, Tyson staggered Ruddock with a right hook to the side of his head, causing Ruddock to hold on to Tyson to prevent taking any more damage. After the bell rang, Tyson threw two punches at Ruddock, who in turn responded with a powerful right hand that just missed connecting with Tyson. Referee Mills Lane warned the two fighters between rounds that he would deduct points should punches be thrown after the bell. Tyson continued to attack Ruddock in round 2, hitting him with another strong right hand in the round's opening seconds. Later in the round, Tyson hit Ruddock with a 3-punch combination as Ruddock was against the ropes, though one of the punches was below the belt, causing Lane to separate the two and issue a warning to Tyson. After Lane's warning, Tyson hit Ruddock with a strong right overhand that knocked Ruddock to the canvas. Ruddock almost immediately got back up but was met with a furious onslaught from Tyson, who continued to hammer Ruddock with punches until fatigue set in with about 30 seconds left in the round. Ruddock bounced back with a strong round 3, but in round 4, Tyson countered a Ruddock uppercut and landed a right hook that again sent Ruddock to canvas, though Ruddock was again able to quickly get back to his feet. Tyson also had the first of three points deducted in round 4 after once again landing a low blow on Ruddock. Tyson also lost points in both the 9th and 10th rounds for hitting Ruddock with another low blow and hitting him after the bell, while Ruddock lost a point in the 8th for hitting Tyson after the bell. In round 11, the two fighters exchanged low blows, but Lane opted not to deduct points, instead warning the two to "knock that shit off". In round 12, Tyson fought Ruddock aggressively in an attempt to gain the knockout victory, but Ruddock was able to withstand Tyson's attack and survive the fight without any further knockdowns. By the end of the fight, Ruddock's left eye had been swollen shut and his jaw had been broken, while Tyson suffered a perforated eardrum.

== Aftermath ==
After months of tough negotiations between Tyson's and Evander Holyfield's respective camps, which included both men's promoters attempting to get a fight with George Foreman instead, a deal was reached that would see Holyfield and Tyson face each other for the Undisputed Heavyweight Championship on 8 November 1991, at Caesars Palace. However, Tyson suffered an injury during training camp and the fight was postponed.

Shortly after the agreement was struck for the Holyfield fight, Tyson was in Indianapolis for the Miss Black America pageant. There he met Desiree Washington, Miss Black Rhode Island; Washington later accused Tyson of raping her and he was arrested on that charge several weeks later. The case was tried beginning in January 1992 and Tyson was convicted on four counts of rape; he was sentenced to a maximum of ten years, four of which were suspended, in state prison and thus his boxing career was placed on an indefinite hiatus.

Meanwhile, Ruddock bounced back from his two losses to Tyson with knockout victories over Greg Page and Phil Jackson. This set up a match with Lennox Lewis for the right to face the winner of the Evander Holyfield–Riddick Bowe fight for the Undisputed Heavyweight Championship. Ruddock was knocked out by Lewis in the 2nd round, costing him a chance at the title and effectively ending his status as one of boxing's premier heavyweights.

== Undercard ==
Confirmed bouts:

Winner	Loser	Weight division/title belt(s) disputed	Result
(Ghana) Azumah Nelson	(Australia) Jeff Fenech	WBC World Super featherweight title	Split draw
(United States) Riddick Bowe	(Puerto Rico) Rodolfo Marin	Heavyweight (10 rounds)	2nd-round KO
Non-TV bouts
(United States) Dennis Milton	(United States) Pat Brennan	Super middleweight (10 rounds)	2nd-round TKO
(Puerto Rico) Nelson Adams	(United States) Toraino Ellis	Heavyweight (4 rounds)	1st-round TKO
(Puerto Rico) Luis Rolón	(United States) Anthony Barela	Featherweight (4 rounds)	Unanimous Decision

== Broadcasting ==
Country	Broadcaster
Philippines	Islands TV 13
United States	Showtime

Preceded by First Match	Mike Tyson's bouts 28 June 1991	Succeeded by vs. Peter McNeeley
Preceded by First Match	Donovan Ruddock's bouts 28 June 1991	Succeeded by vs. Greg Page
