= Tyrone Trice =

American boxer (1963–2023)

Personal information
- Nickname: The Butterfly
- Nationality: American
- Born: Tyrone Trice; October 23, 1963 Milwaukee, Wisconsin
- Died: November 8, 2023 (age 60) Milwaukee, Wisconsin
- Weight: Welterweight, Light Middleweight, Middleweight

Boxing career
- Stance: Orthodox

Boxing record
- Total fights: 53
- Wins: 43
- Win by KO: 35
- Losses: 10
- Draws: 0
- No contests: 0

Tyrone Trice (October 23, 1963 - November 8, 2023) was an American former professional boxer who competed from 1983 to 1996. He is a one-time International Boxing Council (IBC) Middleweight champion and WBA Americas Welterweight champion. Trice also had two world-title challenges for the IBF Welterweight and WBO Middleweight titles.

== Professional career ==
=== Welterweight ===
Trice quickly rose through the ranks, winning his first twelve fights before a shock first-round KO loss to Freddie Pendleton. After continuing to win many fights via knockout, Trice became the number two contender for the vacant IBF Welterweight title. A title match with number one contender Simon Brown took place at the Palais des sports in Berck-sur-Mer, France on April 23, 1988. Trice was dominant in the fight early on, knocking down Brown in the second round. However, he eventually tired through the later rounds and Brown was able to wear Trice down. Trice was knocked down three times in the 12th round and was finally defeated via knockout in the 14th round.

After the loss, Trice recovered and won a series of tune-up fights before defeating Kevin Pompey for the WBA Americas Welterweight Title. A rematch was then fought between Trice and Brown. As with the first contest, it was a close and entertaining fight with Brown prevailing again, this time in the eleventh round by knockout. After this loss, Trice decided to compete in the Middleweight division.

=== Middleweight ===
In his first Middleweight bout, Trice defeated Rafael Williams to win the vacant IBC Light-Middleweight Title. After an impressive third-round TKO victory over undefeated Nestor Maciel to defend the title, Trice challenged John David Jackson for the WBO Light-Middleweight title. Trice took Jackson to the full twelve rounds but Jackson was well in control throughout the match, staggering Trice several times in the fight and winning via unanimous decision. Trice was then defeated again two months later in a ninth-round TKO by Julio César Vásquez.

=== Feud with James Toney ===
Rumours began circulating that a matchup between Trice and multiple Middleweight champion James Toney would take place between late 1992 to early 1993. After an easy round one TKO victory over Ron Collins for which Toney was present in the ringside audience, Trice seized the microphone from announcer Wally Jackson after he was declared the victor. After insulting then WBO Middleweight Champion Gerald McClellan (who Trice claimed backed out of a title bout against him), Trice challenged Toney to a $50,000 bet that he would defeat him before 10 rounds at any time of Toney's choosing. Toney, angry at Trice's words, entered the ring and challenged Trice to a fight then and there. Trice approached Toney but was then escorted out of the ring by his ring crew and the referee.

Ultimately the much anticipated match between Trice and Toney never materialized due to a number of disputes between both camps regarding money, the venue where the bout should take place and several other factors.

=== Later career and retirement ===
Trice's career would begin to decline from late 1992 until his retirement, losing several fights which included losses to Thomas Tate and Joe Lipsey. He also did not participate in any further title matches. His final match took place on February 18, 1996, where he defeated the unrated Gary Jones in a fourth-round knockout. He retired shortly after. He continues to reside in his hometown of Milwaukee today.

== Professional boxing record ==
43 Wins (35 knockouts, 8 decisions), 10 Losses (5 knockouts, 5 decisions) Archived April 18, 2014, at the Wayback Machine
| Result | Record | Opponent | Type | Round | Date | Location | Notes |
| Win | 2-20-2 | (United States) Gary Jones | KO | 4 | 18/02/1996 | (United States) Minot, North Dakota | |
| Loss | 9-13-2 | (United States) Eric L. French | UD | 10 | 03/12/1994 | (United States) Eagles Auditorium, Milwaukee, Wisconsin | |
| Loss | 18-0 | (United States) Joe Lipsey | PTS | 10 | 23/07/1993 | (United States) Lansing, Michigan | |
| Loss | 32-4-2 | (France) Frederic Seillier | KO | 9 | 24/04/1993 | (France) Port-de-Bouc, Bouches-du-Rhone | |
| Win | 21-59-1 | (United States) Jake Torrance | UD | 8 | 05/02/1993 | (United States) Eagles Auditorium, Milwaukee, Wisconsin | |
| Loss | 25-2 | (United States) Thomas Tate | UD | 10 | 02/02/1993 | (United States) The Palace of Auburn Hills, Auburn Hills, Michigan | |
| Loss | 31-7 | (United States) Brett Lally | MD | 10 | 24/11/1992 | (United States) The Palace of Auburn Hills, Auburn Hills, Michigan | |
| Win | 23-8 | (United States) Bill "Fireball" Bradley | TKO | 4 | 25/08/1992 | (United States) The Palace of Auburn Hills, Auburn Hills, Michigan | |
| Win | 25-2 | (United States) Ron Collins | TKO | 1 | 21/07/1992 | (United States) The Palace of Auburn Hills, Auburn Hills, Michigan | Referee stopped the bout at 1:36 of the first round. |
| Win | 0-13-1 | (United States) Larry Lipscomb | KO | 3 | 28/03/1992 | (United States) Doraville, Georgia | |
| Loss | 31-1 | (Argentina) Julio César Vásquez | TKO | 9 | 19/09/1991 | (France) Paris | |
| Loss | 23-0 | (United States) J.D. Jackson | UD | 12 | 21/07/1991 | (United States) Atlantic City Race Course, Atlantic City, New Jersey | WBO Light Middleweight Title. |
| Win | 18-0 | (Mexico) Nestor Maciel | TKO | 3 | 07/03/1991 | Palacio de Deportes de la Comunidad de Madrid, Madrid, Spain | |
| Win | 31-7 | (Panama) Rafael Williams | TKO | 6 | 29/11/1990 | (United States) Walter Kerr Theatre, New York City | IBC Light Middleweight Title. |
| Loss | 31-1 | (Jamaica) Simon "Mantequilla" Brown | TKO | 10 | 01/04/1990 | (United States) DC Armory, Washington, District of Columbia | IBF Welterweight Title. Referee stopped the bout at 0:51 of the tenth round. |
| Win | 17-2-1 | (United States) Kevin Pompey | UD | 12 | 14/01/1990 | (United States) Caesars Atlantic City, Atlantic City, New Jersey | WBA Americas Welterweight Title. |
| Win | 25-16-3 | (United States) Ron Johnson | TKO | 3 | 25/03/1989 | Sheraton Hotel, Casablanca, Morocco | |
| Win | 28-29-3 | (United States) Dexter Smith | PTS | 10 | 06/03/1989 | Nogent-le-Phaye, France | |
| Win | 21-10 | (Mexico) Juan Alonso Villa | KO | 1 | 12/12/1988 | Nogent-le-Phaye, France | |
| Win | 12-13-2 | (Venezuela) Orlando Orozco | KO | 1 | 09/11/1988 | Paris, France | |
| Win | 10-1 | (Mexico) Luis Francisco Perez | TKO | 2 | 09/10/1988 | Franconville, France | |
| Win | 9-3-1 | (United States) Efren Brown | TKO | 6 | 24/09/1988 | Berck, France | |
| Win | 5-4 | Luciano Fernandez | TKO | 4 | 13/08/1988 | Deauville, France | |
| Loss | 24-1 | (Jamaica) Simon "Mantequilla" Brown | TKO | 14 | 23/04/1988 | Palais des Sports, Berck, France | IBF Welterweight Title. Referee stopped the bout at 2:29 of the 14th round. |
| Win | 5-6 | (United States) Mike English | TKO | 1 | 20/11/1987 | (United States) Cobo Hall, Detroit, Michigan | Referee stopped the bout at 1:49 of the first round. |
| Win | 7-41-1 | (United States) Walter Cowans | TKO | 2 | 10/10/1987 | (United States) Sandusky, Ohio | |
| Win | 14-5-1 | (United States) Steve "Lightning" Little | UD | 10 | 06/08/1987 | (United States) Felt Forum, New York City | |
| Win | 14-10 | (United States) Dennis Johnson | TKO | 8 | 23/10/1986 | (United States) Cobo Arena, Detroit, Michigan | |
| Win | 14-1-1 | (United States) Curtis Summit | TKO | 1 | 10/06/1986 | (United States) Detroit, Michigan | |
| Win | 13-6-2 | (United States) Marvin Ray Jones | TKO | 2 | 24/04/1986 | (United States) Cobo Arena, Detroit, Michigan | Referee stopped the bout at 2:59 of the second round. |
| Win | 2-1 | (United States) Jesse Flores | TKO | 4 | 22/03/1986 | (United States) Lawlor Events Center, Reno, Nevada | |
| Win | 9-12 | (United States) Steve Mitchell | KO | 6 | 28/02/1986 | (United States) Laughlin, Nevada | |
| Win | 20-4-2 | (United States) Michael "Bomber" Bradley | RTD | 3 | 23/01/1986 | (United States) Cobo Arena, Detroit, Michigan | |
| Win | 12-9-2 | (United States) Dave Odem | TKO | 7 | 21/11/1985 | (United States) Detroit, Michigan | |
| Win | 12-14-1 | (United States) Jose "Speedy" Gonzalez | KO | 5 | 24/10/1985 | (United States) Cobo Arena, Detroit, Michigan | Gonzalez knocked out at 2:38 of the fifth round. |
| Win | 23-5 | (United States) Tyrone Moore | UD | 10 | 12/09/1985 | (United States) Cobo Hall, Detroit, Michigan | |
| Win | 1-5 | Jesus De la Cruz | KO | 1 | 22/08/1985 | (United States) Detroit, Michigan | |
| Win | 5-11-6 | (United States) Ken Willis | KO | 3 | 06/04/1985 | (United States) Bally's Park Place, Atlantic City, New Jersey | |
| Win | 10-8 | (United States) Anthony Bryant | TKO | 3 | 24/10/1984 | (United States) Cobo Arena, Detroit, Michigan | Referee stopped the bout at 1:17 of the third round. |
| Win | 23-3 | (United States) Tyrone Moore | PTS | 10 | 15/08/1984 | (United States) Las Vegas, Nevada | |
| Loss | 10-8-1 | (United States) Freddie Pendleton | TKO | 1 | 28/06/1984 | (United States) Detroit, Michigan | |
| Win | 0-1 | Ruben Gallardo | TKO | 6 | 31/05/1984 | (United States) Detroit, Michigan | |
| Win | 14-9 | (United States) Teddy Hatfield | TKO | 2 | 03/05/1984 | (United States) Cobo Hall, Detroit, Michigan | |
| Win | 1-3 | (United States) Bob Graddy | TKO | 6 | 15/04/1984 | (United States) Detroit, Michigan | |
| Win | -- | Sean McGill | KO | 2 | 11/02/1984 | (United States) Joe Louis Arena, Detroit, Michigan | |
| Win | 1-7-2 | (United States) Nate Stewart | TKO | 2 | 03/02/1984 | (United States) Americana Congress Hotel, Chicago, Illinois | Referee stopped the bout at 2:27 of the second round. |
| Win | 10-1 | (United States) Victor Gordon | KO | 4 | 27/10/1983 | (United States) Atlantic City, New Jersey | |
| Win | 3-4 | (United States) Leslie Toney | TKO | 2 | 30/09/1983 | (United States) Eagles Club, Milwaukee, Wisconsin | |
| Win | 7-3-2 | (United States) Dave Odem | PTS | 6 | 25/08/1983 | (United States) Lakeland Arena, Waterford, Michigan | |
| Win | -- | (United States) Manuel Toribio | KO | 2 | 10/07/1983 | (United States) Caesars Atlantic City, Atlantic City, New Jersey | Toribio knocked out at 3:01 of the second round. |
| Win | -- | (United States) Willy Paul Maxwell | KO | 1 | 12/06/1983 | (United States) Phoenix, Arizona | |
| Win | 1-1 | (United States) Fred Tice | TKO | 1 | 04/06/1983 | (United States) Traverse City, Michigan | |
| Win | -- | (United States) "Rockin" Rodney Moore | PTS | 4 | 26/05/1983 | (United States) The Sands, Atlantic City, New Jersey | |
