= James Hughes (boxer) =

American boxer (1965–1995)

James Melvin Hughes (October 20, 1965, Mobile, Alabama – July 25, 1995) was an American professional boxer in the welterweight division.

== Boxing career ==
Known as "Jesse James" and "The Outlaw", Hughes turned professional in 1987 and is perhaps best known for his appearances on the USA Tuesday Night Fights series. During his career he suffered defeats to Maurice Blocker, Vincent Pettway, and James McGirt among others. In 1994 and 1995 he went on a win streak and captured the USBA welterweight championship belt and he appeared headed towards a big payday, but his final bout was to be against Nick Rupa in late 1995.

== Murder ==
Hughes' body was found face down in a swamp near his home shortly after his fight with Rupa. The autopsy revealed that Hughes had received a blunt trauma to the head, but not one that would have resulted in his death. There were no knife wounds, no cut marks, no holes in his body, there were no powder burns on his body. The autopsy report also states that trace amounts of cocaine were found in Hughes’ liver, but again, not enough to have killed him or caused him serious harm. His cause of death could not be determined, although he had water in his lungs.
