= Mike Tyson vs. Donovan Ruddock =

Boxing match

Fight of the Year
- Date: March 18, 1991
- Venue: The Mirage, Paradise, Nevada, U.S.

Tale of the tape
Boxer	Mike Tyson	Donovan Ruddock
Nickname	Iron	Razor
Hometown	Catskill, New York, U.S.	Toronto, Ontario, Canada
Purse	$6,000,000	$3,000,000
Pre-fight record	39–1 (35 KO)	25–1–1 (18 KO)
Age	24 years, 8 months	27 years, 2 months
Height	5 ft 10 in (178 cm)	6 ft 3 in (191 cm)
Weight	217 lb (98 kg)	228 lb (103 kg)
Style	Orthodox	Orthodox
Recognition	WBA/WBC/IBF; No. 1 Ranked Heavyweight; The Ring; No. 2 Ranked Heavyweight; The Ring No. 7 ranked pound-for-pound fighter Former undisputed heavyweight champion	WBA/WBC/IBF; No. 2 Ranked Heavyweight; The Ring; No. 3 Ranked Heavyweight

Result
- Tyson wins via 7th-round TKO

Mike Tyson vs. Donovan Ruddock, billed as Fight of the Year, was a professional boxing match contested on March 18, 1991 at the Mirage in Paradise, Nevada. At the time the two fighters were the top two ranked contenders for the WBC, WBA, and IBF world heavyweight championships that were at the time held by Evander Holyfield. The bout was a twelve-round championship eliminator fight, with the winner becoming the mandatory challenger to Holyfield's crown.

Tyson, the former champion, defeated Ruddock by technical knockout in the seventh round but the circumstances surrounding the stoppage nearly caused a riot and a rematch was signed to settle the dispute.

== Background ==
Tyson and Ruddock had originally been set to face each other on November 18, 1989, in Edmonton, Alberta, in Ruddock's adopted home country of Canada for Tyson's undisputed world championship. However, the fight was postponed and ultimately cancelled because Tyson was suffering from costochondritis. Tyson instead would fight James "Buster" Douglas on February 11, 1990 in Tokyo, where he would be knocked out in a massive upset and lose his belts.

Tyson would fight twice more in 1990 and won both bouts by first-round knockout. He defeated 1984 Olympic gold medalist Henry Tillman on June 16 and then beat undefeated up-and-coming prospect Alex Stewart on December 8.

Ruddock, meanwhile, had won twenty-five of his first twenty-seven fights, with his only defeat coming at the hands of journeyman David Jaco early in his career. He had also defeated former world champions Mike Weaver, James "Bonecrusher" Smith, and Michael Dokes along the way.

On December 9, 1990, the day after Tyson defeated Stewart, Tyson promoter Don King announced Ruddock would indeed be Tyson's next opponent while also announcing that Tyson and Showtime had agreed to a blockbuster long term pay-per-view deal that would pay Tyson $120 million.

== The fights ==
=== Undercard ===
Future long-time middleweight and light heavyweight champion Bernard Hopkins and former world heavyweight champion Greg Page both featured on the undercard winning both their fights by stoppage.

=== Durán vs. Lawlor ===
The first event on the PPV card saw former multi-weight world champion Roberto Durán face former sparring partner Pat Lawlor. This was Duran's first fight in 15 months, since losing his third bout against Sugar Ray Leonard.

In the 6th round a right hand from Lawlor landed on the shoulder of Durán, causing him to grabbed his it, bend over and grimace in pain. Referee Vic Drakulich stopped the action in order to summon Dr. Flip Homansky who told the referee that Durán could not continue and the bout was waved off despite Durán's protests.

Preceded by vs. Ray Leonard III	Roberto Durán's bouts 18 March 1991	Succeeded by vs. Tony Biglen
Preceded by vs. Wilfred Benitez	Pat Lawlor's bouts 18 March 1991	Succeeded by vs. Art Serwano

=== Brown vs. Blocker ===
Fight of the Year:Simon Brown vs. Maurice Blocker
- Title(s) on the line: WBC and IBF welterweight titles

Tale of the tape
Boxer	Simon Brown	Maurice Blocker
Nickname	"Mantequilla"	"Thin Man"
Hometown	May Pen, Middlesex, Jamaica	Washington, D.C., U.S.
Purse	$1,000,000	$1,000,000
Pre-fight record	33–1 (25 KO)	32–1 (18 KO)
Age	27 years, 7 months	27 years, 10 months
Height	5 ft 9 in (175 cm)	5 ft 11 1/4 in (181 cm)
Weight	147 lb (67 kg)	146 lb (66 kg)
Style	Orthodox	Orthodox
Recognition	IBF; Welterweight Champion; The Ring; No. 2 Ranked Welterweight	WBC; Welterweight Champion; The Ring; No. 3 Ranked Welterweight

Result
- Brown defeats Blocker by 10th round TKO

The first world title bout on the card was a title unification bout between IBF welterweight champion Simon Brown and WBC & lineal champion Maurice Blocker.

==== Background ====
Brown was making the eighth defence the title he had held since April 1988, where as Blocker had only won his titles from Marlon Starling the previous August and was making his first defence. Both men were hoping to next face WBA champion Meldrick Taylor.

The two men had been long time stablemates and sparing partners. With Brown recalling that "Me and Maurice have been stablemates and like brothers since 1979. We sparred for almost six or seven years. Now we've split up. He went with Butch (Lewis) and I'm now with Don King. We've had good days and bad days. We always tried to come out on top as much as possible. It's not for me to really say who got the best of it. In the gym, you try things over and over to get it perfect. In the ring, it's different." He also described Blocker as a "very good defensive fighter. He's also a very good boxer, straight up and tall trying to use jab." Nevertheless he fully expected to win "It'll be a great fight. If he cooperates and sticks his chin out early, I'll finish early. If not, I'll win a decision."

Blocker similarly expected their friendship to survive the in ring battle saying "I'm not putting anything personal at stake here. The only thing I'm putting at stake is my ability. It's professional, not personal. We never anticipated something like this happening. We both anticipated some day being champions, but not at the same time in the same weight division."

The IBF had threatened to strip Brown for failing to make a mandatory defence against No. 1 contender Glenwood Brown. In the week of the fight, a court order mandated that the winner of the Brown vs. Blocker bout would have to defend against Glenwood Brown within 120 days and then the winner of that fight to defend against No. 2 contender Buddy McGirt or be stripped.

This was the first welterweight unification match since Donald Curry vs. Milton McCrory in 1985.

==== The fight ====
After a closely fought bout, Brown would drop Blocker 32 seconds into the 10th round with a right-left hook combination. Blocker would beat the count but Brown would spend the rest of the round chasing him until catching with a flurry of rights. Blocker appeared hurt and dropped his hands prompting referee Mills Lane to stop the bout. The two men embraced in the ring after the bout.

Blocker was ahead on all of the judges’ scorecards at the time of the stoppage.

Preceded by vs. Ozzie O'Neal	Simon Brown's bouts 18 March 1991	Succeeded by vs. Buddy McGirt
Preceded by vs. Marlon Starling	Maurice Blocker's bouts 18 March 1991	Succeeded by vs. Glenwood Brown

=== Chávez vs. Duplessis ===
In the second world title bout, Julio César Chávez defended his WBC and IBF super lightweight championships against John Duplessis, knocking him out in the fourth round to extend his undefeated streak to seventy-three bouts.

Preceded by vs. Kyung-Duk Ahn	Julio César Chávez's bouts 18 March 1991	Succeeded by vs. Tommy Small
Preceded by vs. Larry Benson	John Duplessis's bouts 18 March 1991	Succeeded by vs. Ed Malone

=== Main Event ===
The fight was a hard-fought one, with both men hitting each other with power punches throughout the fight. Early in the second round, Tyson scored a controversial knockdown. After being hit with a left hook to the shoulder, Ruddock tripped over Tyson's right leg and fell to the canvas. Referee Richard Steele awarded Tyson with the knockdown. Shortly after, Tyson would illegally hit Ruddock with a right hand as the two men were being separated by Steele, though Steele did not deduct a point from Tyson. Ruddock would suffer another knockdown late in round 3. After hitting Tyson with a straight left hand with less than 10 seconds to go in the round, Tyson countered with a powerful left hook to the side of Ruddock's head that again sent Ruddock to the canvas. Ruddock was able to get up at the count of 8 as the round ended. The fight would come to an end with less than a minute remaining in round 7. Tyson was able to hit Ruddock with a six-punch combination. Though Ruddock remained on his feet and was seemingly healthy enough to continue the fight, Steele stepped between the two fighters and stopped the fight, awarding Tyson the victory by technical knockout.

== Aftermath ==
The decision enraged Ruddock's corner with Ruddock's brother and manager, Delroy storming the ring to confront Steele. Tyson's trainer Richie Giachetti attempted to restrain Delroy but a melee ensued that also involved Ruddock's promoter Murad Muhammad. Mirage security had to break up the scuffle and escort Steele to safety.

== Undercard ==
Confirmed bouts:

Winner	Loser	Weight division/title belt(s) disputed	Result
(Mexico) Julio César Chávez	(United States) John Duplessis	WBC World Light welterweight title	4th round TKO
(Jamaica) Simon Brown	(United States) Maurice Blocker	WBC and IBF World Welterweight titles	10th round TKO
(United States) Pat Lawlor	(Panama) Roberto Durán	Super middleweight (10 rounds)	6th round TKO
Non-TV bouts
(United States) Greg Page	(United States) Mark Young	Heavyweight (8 rounds)	3rd round TKO
(United States) Bernard Hopkins	(United States) Steve Langley	Middleweight (8 rounds)	3rd round TKO
(Uganda) Justin Juuko	(United States) Gilberto Diaz	Featherweight (4 rounds)	3rd round RTD

== Broadcasting ==
Country	Broadcaster
Philippines	Islands TV 13
United States	Showtime

Preceded by vs. Alex Stewart	Mike Tyson's bouts 18 March 1991	Succeeded by Rematch
Preceded by vs. Mike Rouse	Donovan Ruddock's bouts 18 March 1991	Succeeded by Rematch
