= Simon Brown (boxer) =

Jamaican boxer

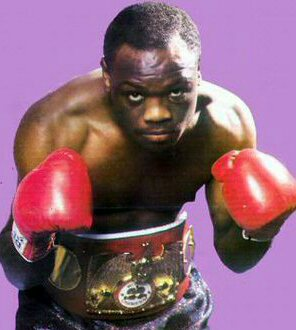
- Brown c. 1988

Personal information
- Nickname: Mantequilla
- Born: Ceseford Brown; August 15, 1963 (age 63) May Pen, Jamaica
- Height: 5 ft 9 in (175 cm)
- Weight: Welterweight; Light middleweight; Middleweight

Boxing career
- Reach: 71 in (180 cm)
- Stance: Orthodox

Boxing record
- Total fights: 59
- Wins: 47
- Win by KO: 34
- Losses: 12

Simon Brown (born August 15, 1963) is a Jamaican former professional boxer. Known as "Mantequilla", a name given to him by his famous trainer Jose 'Pepe' Correa, Brown was two-weight world champion in the welterweight and light-middleweight divisions, and at one point considered one of the best pound-for-pound fighters in boxing.

== Professional boxing career ==
=== Welterweight ===
Brown began his career in 1982 at the age of 19 and ran off a string of 21 consecutive victories, prior to losing a split decision to Marlon Starling for the USBA welterweight title in 1985. Simon won three consecutive bouts, including a victory against undefeated former Olympian Shawn O'Sullivan to line up a shot at the vacant IBF welterweight title against Tyrone Trice. Brown won via 14th round TKO and went on to successfully defend his title 9 times, including a unification bout with Lineal/WBC welterweight champion Maurice Blocker, winning by TKO in the 10th. Brown lost his belts in his next fight to James McGirt.

=== Light-middleweight ===
After the loss, Brown moved up to light-middleweight and in 1993 defeated Terry Norris via a devastating 4th round KO to win the WBC light-middleweight title in a fight proclaimed Upset of the Year by Ring Magazine. After making one successful defense of the WBC title against Troy Waters, Brown lost a rematch and the title to Norris via a clear decision in May 1994.

In 1995, Brown challenged IBF light-middleweight title holder Vincent Pettway. Brown knocked Pettway down towards the end of round one, and was knocked down by a Pettway right hand in round three. In round five, Brown hit Pettway low then continued to hit Pettway until Pettway fell through the ropes. Not seeing the low blow, the referee ruled a knockdown. In round six, Brown was knocked out by a Pettway left hook. Brown famously continued to throw punches whilst lying on his back unconscious.

In his next bout, Brown lost a hard-fought ten round decision to former WBA welterweight title holder Aaron Davis.

=== Middleweight ===
In August 1996, Brown challenged undefeated WBO middleweight title holder Lonnie Bradley and lost a unanimous decision. Brown then challenged IBF middleweight title holder Bernard Hopkins in January 1998, but lost via TKO in the round six. This was to be Brown's last title shot.

After the loss to Hopkins, he went on a five fight losing streak, including defeats to Olympian David Reid and Omar Sheika, and retired after the loss to Sheika in 2000.

Brown is now a trainer in Hagerstown, MD.

== Professional boxing record ==
| 59 fights | 47 wins | 12 losses |
|---|---|---|
| By knockout | 34 | 4 |
| By decision | 13 | 8 |

| No. | Result | Record | Opponent | Type | Round, time | Date | Location | Notes |
|---|---|---|---|---|---|---|---|---|
| 59 | Loss | 47–12 | Omar Sheika | UD | 8 | 8 Jan 2000 | University Arena, Albuquerque, New Mexico, U.S. | |
| 58 | Loss | 47–11 | Mads Larsen | RTD | 5 (8) | 1 Oct 1999 | Arena Randers, Randers, Denmark | |
| 57 | Loss | 47–10 | Kenny Lopez | SD | 10 | 31 Jul 1999 | Club Cal Neva, Reno, Nevada, U.S. | |
| 56 | Loss | 47–9 | Quirino Garcia | UD | 12 | 14 May 1999 | Ciudad Juárez, Mexico | For WBC International light-middleweight title |
| 55 | Loss | 47–8 | David Reid | KO | 4 (10), 2:00 | 27 Jun 1998 | Apollo Theater, Philadelphia, Pennsylvania, U.S. | |
| 54 | Loss | 47–7 | Bernard Hopkins | TKO | 6 (12), 1:00 | 31 Jan 1998 | Trump Taj Mahal, Atlantic City, New Jersey, U.S. | For IBF middleweight title |
| 53 | Win | 47–6 | Rueben Bell | RTD | 5 (10) | 12 Sep 1997 | Pikesville Armory, Pikesville, Maryland, U.S. | |
| 52 | Win | 46–6 | David Mendez | RTD | 7 (10) | 23 Apr 1997 | Tropicana Hotel & Casino, Paradise, Nevada, U.S. | |
| 51 | Loss | 45–6 | Lonnie Bradley | UD | 12 | 30 Aug 1996 | Municipal Stadium, Reading, Pennsylvania, U.S. | For WBO middleweight title |
| 50 | Win | 45–5 | Glenwood Brown | UD | 10 | 18 Jun 1996 | Convention Center, Edison, New Jersey, U.S. | |
| 49 | Win | 44–5 | Mike Bryan | KO | 1 (?) | 15 Mar 1996 | Kingston, Jamaica | |
| 48 | Loss | 43–5 | Aaron Davis | UD | 10 | 16 Sep 1995 | Tropicana Hotel & Casino, Atlantic City, New Jersey, U.S. | |
| 47 | Loss | 43–4 | Vincent Pettway | KO | 6 (12), 2:07 | 29 Apr 1995 | USAir Arena, Landover, Maryland, U.S. | |
| 46 | Win | 43–3 | Frank Newton | TKO | 1 (10) | 17 Dec 1994 | Coliseo General Rumiñahui, Quito, Ecuador | |
| 45 | Win | 42–3 | Nestor Maciel | UD | 10 | 12 Sep 1994 | Silver Nugget, North Las Vegas, Nevada, U.S. | |
| 44 | Loss | 41–3 | Terry Norris | UD | 12 | 7 May 1994 | MGM Grand Garden Arena, Paradise, Nevada, U.S. | Lost WBC light-middleweight title |
| 43 | Win | 41–2 | Troy Waters | MD | 12 | 29 Jan 1994 | MGM Grand Garden Arena, Paradise, Nevada, U.S. | Retained WBC light-middleweight title |
| 42 | Win | 40–2 | Terry Norris | KO | 4 (12), 1:06 | 18 Dec 1993 | Estadio Cuauhtémoc, Puebla, Mexico | Won WBC light-middleweight title |
| 41 | Win | 39–2 | Verdell Smith | TKO | 3 (10), 2:37 | 23 Oct 1993 | Convention Center, Fort Lauderdale, Florida, U.S. | |
| 40 | Win | 38–2 | Terry Acker | TKO | 2 (10), 2:46 | 6 Aug 1993 | Coliseo Rubén Rodríguez, Bayamón, Puerto Rico | |
| 39 | Win | 37–2 | Carlton Haywood | PTS | 10 | 23 Apr 1993 | The Pyramid, Memphis, Tennessee, U.S. | |
| 38 | Win | 36–2 | Anthony Ivory | UD | 10 | 1 Aug 1992 | Hilton Hotel, Winchester, Nevada, U.S. | |
| 37 | Win | 35–2 | Melvin Wynn | KO | 2 (10) | 26 Jun 1992 | Cleveland State Convocation Centre, Cleveland, Ohio, U.S. | |
| 36 | Loss | 34–2 | Buddy McGirt | UD | 12 | 29 Nov 1991 | Mirage Hotel & Casino, Paradise, Nevada, U.S. | Lost WBC welterweight title |
| 35 | Win | 34–1 | Maurice Blocker | TKO | 10 (12), 2:10 | 18 Mar 1991 | Mirage Hotel & Casino, Paradise, Nevada, U.S. | Retained IBF welterweight title; Won WBC welterweight title |
| 34 | Win | 33–1 | Ozzie O'Neal | TKO | 1 (10), 1:53 | 8 Dec 1990 | Convention Center, Atlantic City, New Jersey, U.S. | |
| 33 | Win | 32–1 | Tyrone Trice | TKO | 10 (12), 0:51 | 1 Apr 1990 | D.C. Armory, Washington, D.C., U.S. | Retained IBF welterweight title |
| 32 | Win | 31–1 | Luis Santana | UD | 12 | 9 Nov 1989 | Civic Center, Springfield, Massachusetts, U.S. | Retained IBF welterweight title |
| 31 | Win | 30–1 | Bobby Joe Young | KO | 2 (12), 2:39 | 20 Sep 1989 | War Memorial Auditorium, Rochester, New York, U.S. | Retained IBF welterweight title |
| 30 | Win | 29–1 | Al Long | KO | 7 (12), 2:46 | 27 Apr 1989 | D.C. Armory, Washington, D.C., U.S. | Retained IBF welterweight title |
| 29 | Win | 28–1 | Jorge Maysonet | TKO | 3 (12), 2:01 | 18 Feb 1989 | Sportcsarnok Hall, Budapest, Hungary | Retained IBF welterweight title |
| 28 | Win | 27–1 | Mauro Martelli | UD | 12 | 14 Oct 1988 | Patinoire de Malley, Lausanne, Switzerland | Retained IBF welterweight title |
| 27 | Win | 26–1 | Jorge Vaca | TKO | 3 (15), 2:05 | 16 Jul 1988 | The National Arena, Kingston, Jamaica | Retained IBF welterweight title |
| 26 | Win | 25–1 | Tyrone Trice | TKO | 14 (15), 2:29 | 23 Apr 1988 | Palais des Sports, Berck, France | Won vacant IBF welterweight title |
| 25 | Win | 24–1 | Dexter Smith | TKO | 6 (10) | 25 Sep 1987 | Pegasus Hotel, Kingston, Jamaica | |
| 24 | Win | 23–1 | Shawn O'Sullivan | TKO | 3 (10), 2:37 | 8 Jun 1986 | CNE Coliseum, Toronto, Ontario, Canada | |
| 23 | Win | 22–1 | Kevin Howard | TKO | 7 (10), 1:19 | 21 Mar 1986 | Convention Center, Washington, D.C., U.S. | |
| 22 | Loss | 21–1 | Marlon Starling | SD | 12 | 22 Nov 1985 | Sands Casino, Atlantic City, New Jersey, U.S. | For USBA welterweight title |
| 21 | Win | 21–0 | Randy Mitchem | TKO | 1 (10), 2:05 | 23 Jul 1985 | Convention Center, Washington, D.C., U.S. | |
| 20 | Win | 20–0 | Martin Rojas | TKO | 8 (10) | 30 Apr 1985 | Tropicana Hotel & Casino, Atlantic City, New Jersey, U.S. | |
| 19 | Win | 19–0 | Jerome Johnson | UD | 10 | 17 Aug 1984 | Tropicana Hotel & Casino, Atlantic City, New Jersey, U.S. | |
| 18 | Win | 18–0 | Clayton Hires | UD | 10 | 2 Jun 1984 | D.C. Armory, Washington, D.C., U.S. | |
| 17 | Win | 17–0 | Robert Adams | UD | 10 | 13 Nov 1983 | Tropicana Hotel & Casino, Atlantic City, New Jersey, U.S. | |
| 16 | Win | 16–0 | Darryl Penn | UD | 10 | 1 Nov 1983 | Tropicana Hotel & Casino, Atlantic City, New Jersey, U.S. | |
| 15 | Win | 15–0 | Domingo Ayala | TKO | 1 (10), 2:41 | 4 Jun 1983 | Sands Casino, Atlantic City, New Jersey, U.S. | |
| 14 | Win | 14–0 | Milton Seward | TKO | 7 (10) | 26 Apr 1983 | Tropicana Hotel & Casino, Atlantic City, New Jersey, U.S. | |
| 13 | Win | 13–0 | Tom Moody | TKO | 3 (10) | 15 Mar 1983 | Tropicana Hotel & Casino, Atlantic City, New Jersey, U.S. | |
| 12 | Win | 12–0 | Ricardo Bryant | TKO | 7 (10), 2:42 | 25 Jan 1983 | Tropicana Hotel & Casino, Atlantic City, New Jersey, U.S. | |
| 11 | Win | 11–0 | Ruby Ortiz | KO | 1 (8) | 14 Dec 1982 | Prince George's Community College, Largo, Maryland, U.S. | |
| 10 | Win | 10–0 | Allen Braswell | TKO | 2 (8) | 9 Nov 1982 | Tropicana Hotel & Casino, Atlantic City, New Jersey, U.S. | |
| 9 | Win | 9–0 | George Burton | TKO | 6 (8) | 5 Oct 1982 | Tropicana Hotel & Casino, Atlantic City, New Jersey, U.S. | |
| 8 | Win | 8–0 | Sergio Bautista | TKO | 7 (8) | 24 Aug 1982 | Tropicana Hotel & Casino, Atlantic City, New Jersey, U.S. | |
| 7 | Win | 7–0 | Carlos Santana | TKO | 3 (8) | 3 Aug 1982 | Tropicana Hotel & Casino, Atlantic City, New Jersey, U.S. | |
| 6 | Win | 6–0 | Eugene Ellington | TKO | 1 (6) | 18 Jul 1982 | Tropicana Hotel & Casino, Atlantic City, New Jersey, U.S. | |
| 5 | Win | 5–0 | Cliff Lee | TKO | 2 (6) | 22 Jun 1982 | Tropicana Hotel & Casino, Atlantic City, New Jersey, U.S. | |
| 4 | Win | 4–0 | Cookie James | TKO | 5 (6) | 27 Apr 1982 | Tropicana Hotel & Casino, Atlantic City, New Jersey, U.S. | |
| 3 | Win | 3–0 | Peanut Wright | TKO | 2 (4) | 10 Apr 1982 | Sands Casino, Atlantic City, New Jersey, U.S. | |
| 2 | Win | 2–0 | Vito Maselli | UD | 6 | 2 Mar 1982 | Tropicana Hotel & Casino, Atlantic City, New Jersey, U.S. | |
| 1 | Win | 1–0 | Ricky Williams | PTS | 4 | 16 Feb 1982 | Tropicana Hotel & Casino, Atlantic City, New Jersey, U.S. | |

== Titles in boxing ==
=== Major world titles ===
- IBF welterweight champion (147 lbs)
- WBC welterweight champion (147 lbs)
- WBC light-middleweight champion (154 lbs)

== See also ==
- Lineal championship
- List of world welterweight boxing champions
- List of world light-middleweight boxing champions

Sporting positions
World boxing titles
| Vacant Title last held by Lloyd Honeyghan | IBF welterweight champion April 23, 1988 – May 7, 1991; Vacated | Vacant Title next held by Maurice Blocker |
| Preceded by Maurice Blocker | WBC welterweight champion March 18, 1991 – November 29, 1991 | Succeeded by Buddy McGirt |
| Preceded by Terry Norris | WBC light-middleweight champion December 18, 1993 – May 7, 1994 | Succeeded by Terry Norris |
Awards
| Previous: Azumah Nelson KO 8 vs. Jeff Fenech II | The Ring Upset of the Year; KO 4 vs. Terry Norris I 1993 | Next: Vuyani Bungu W12 vs. Kennedy McKinney I |
