= Mike Tyson vs. Alex Stewart =

Boxing match

The Hard Way Back
- Date: December 8, 1990
- Venue: Convention Hall, Atlantic City, New Jersey, U.S.

Tale of the tape
Boxer	Mike Tyson	Alex Stewart
Nickname	Iron	The Destroyer
Hometown	Catskill, New York, U.S.	Brooklyn, New York, U.S.
Pre-fight record	38–1 (34 KO)	26–1 (26 KO)
Age	24 years, 5 months	26 years, 5 months
Height	5 ft 10 in (178 cm)	6 ft 3 in (191 cm)
Weight	217 3/4 lb (99 kg)	218 lb (99 kg)
Style	Orthodox	Orthodox
Recognition	WBA/WBC/IBF; No. 1 Ranked Heavyweight; The Ring; No. 2 Ranked Heavyweight; The Ring No. 8 ranked pound-for-pound fighter Former undisputed heavyweight champion	WBA/WBC/IBF; No. 3 Ranked Heavyweight; The Ring; No. 10 Ranked Heavyweight

Result
- Tyson wins via 1st-round TKO

Mike Tyson vs. Alex Stewart, billed as The Hard Way Back, was a professional boxing match contested on December 8, 1990. It was Tyson's second fight since losing the undisputed world heavyweight championship earlier in the year.

== Background ==
On February 11, 1990, James "Buster" Douglas knocked Tyson out in the tenth round of Tyson's tenth defense of his world championship, ending his reign as champion after nearly four years. Douglas then opted to make his first defense of the titles against the mandatory number one contender, former undisputed cruiserweight champion Evander Holyfield, instead of giving Tyson a rematch.

To further complicate things for Tyson, Holyfield knocked an out-of-shape Douglas out in the third round of their fight and began pursuing fights with other contenders. The former champion, thus, had to bide his time and take whatever fights he could get against any contender willing to face him. The first was 1984 Olympic Gold Medalist Henry Tillman, who defeated Tyson twice at the Olympic trials and entered the ring with a 20-4 record as a professional. Tyson dispatched Tillman in the first round.

Alex Stewart, meanwhile, started out his career by winning each of his first twenty-four fights by knockout and had not been taken beyond four rounds in any of them until he faced off against Holyfield in November of 1989. There, Stewart suffered his first career defeat as the ringside physician stopped the contest due to a severe cut in the eighth round that Stewart had been fighting with since early in the fight. Before stepping in the ring with Tyson, he defeated journeymen Mark Young and Jamie Howe in two tuneup bouts.

Though the fight was originally set for September 22, Tyson suffered a deep cut over his right eye due to an accidental headbutt from sparring partner Greg Page. The cut required 48 stitches, causing the fight to be rescheduled for December 8.

== The fight ==
As soon as the match started, Tyson went on the attack and hit Stewart with two right hands, the second of which knocked Stewart to the canvas less than 10 seconds into the fight. Stewart was able to get back up at the count of five and continue the fight, but he was met with a bevy of power punches from Tyson. At 1:05 in the round, Stewart was again knocked down by a right hand from Tyson. This time he got up at the count of eight and referee Frank Cappuccino allowed Stewart to continue. With the three knockdown rule in effect, Tyson would continue his furious assault on Stewart in an effort to get the third knockdown which would give him the automatic victory. At 2:27 in the round, Tyson hit Stewart with a short left hand that knocked Stewart down for the third time, ending the fight and giving Tyson the victory by technical knockout.

== Aftermath ==
Tyson, who at the time was the number one contender, would then agree to fight the dangerous number two contender, Donovan "Razor" Ruddock, with the winner of the fight earning the right to face Holyfield for the Undisputed Heavyweight Championship. Tyson would controversially pick up the victory via 7th round technical knockout after referee Richard Steele stopped the fight despite the fact that Ruddock appeared healthy enough to continue. Because of this, Tyson and Ruddock's camps agreed to a rematch three months later. Tyson would again earn the victory, this time by unanimous decision, but before his planned match with Holyfield could happen, he was charged and subsequently sentenced to six years in prison for rape.

== Undercard ==
Confirmed bouts:

The co-feature bout on the telecast was a super lightweight bout where Julio César Chávez defended his WBC and IBF world championships against Kyung Duk Ahn. Chavez won the fight by knocking out Kyung in the third round to win his 73rd consecutive fight.

Other fighters featured on the card were Donovan Ruddock, who Tyson would face next and who recorded a first round knockout over Mike Rouse; future super welterweight world champion Simon Brown, who also won by first round knockout against Ozzie O'Neal; and former Olympic gold medalist Tyrell Biggs, who defeated previously undefeated Rodolfo Marin to record his fourth consecutive win after being knocked out in three consecutive fights, the first of which was against Tyson.

Winner	Loser	Weight division/title belt(s) disputed	Result
(Mexico) Julio César Chávez	(South Korea) Kyung Duk Ahn	WBC and IBF World Light welterweight title	3rd round TKO
Preliminary bouts
(Canada) Donovan Ruddock	(United States) Mike Rouse	Heavyweight (10 rounds)	1st round KO
Non-TV bouts
(United States) Tyrell Biggs	(Puerto Rico) Rodolfo Marin	Heavyweight (10 rounds)	Unanimous Decision
(Jamaica) Simon Brown	(United States) Ozzie O'Neal	Light middleweight (10 rounds)	1st round TKO
(United States) Lonnie Smith	(Colombia) Eduardo Valdez	Welterweight (10 rounds)	2nd round TKO
(United States) Roger Brown	(Mexico) Humberto Rodríguez	Welterweight (8 rounds)	Unanimous Decision
(Puerto Rico) Héctor Arroyo	(United States) Lyndon Walker	Lightweight (4 rounds)	Points Decision

== Broadcasting ==
The fight was covered by HBO Sports through its World Championship Boxing series. Jim Lampley called the action with Larry Merchant as the analyst. This fight would be the final one of Tyson's fights that HBO televised as part of an eight-fight contract the two parties agreed to in 1987; afterwards, Tyson's promoter Don King announced that he had negotiated a long term deal with Showtime for the exclusive pay-per-view and broadcast rights to Tyson's fights, a relationship that, save for Tyson's matches against Buster Mathis, Jr. (which was televised by Fox) and Lennox Lewis (which was a joint production of Showtime and HBO), would last for the remainder of his career.

Country	Broadcaster
Japan	Wowow
United States	HBO

Preceded by vs. Henry Tillman	Mike Tyson's bouts 8 December 1990	Succeeded by vs. Donovan Ruddock
Preceded by vs. Jamie Howe	Alex Stewart's bouts 8 December 1990	Succeeded by vs. Danny Wofford
