= Azumah Nelson =

Ghanaian boxer (born 1958)

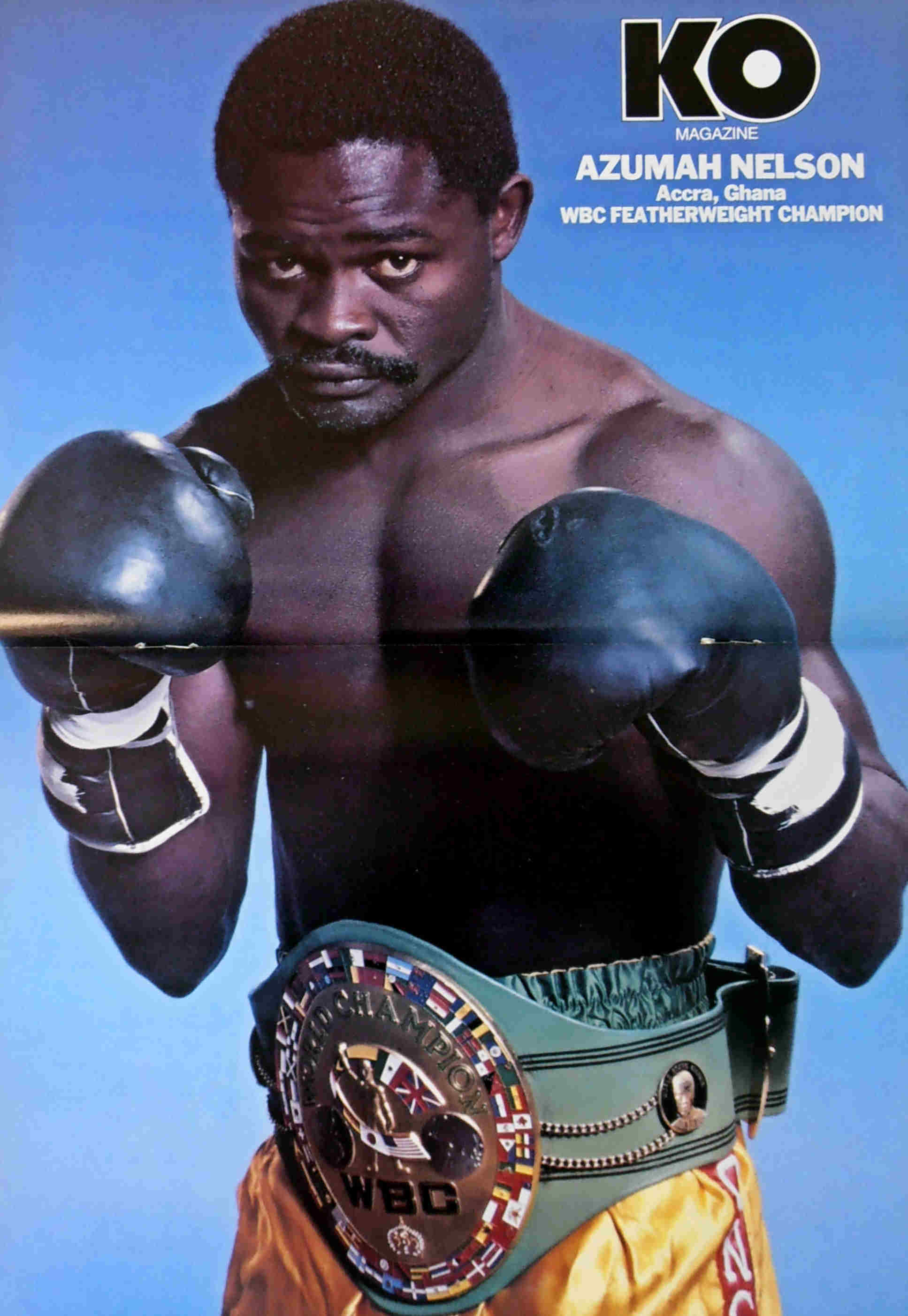
- Nelson c. 1986

Personal information
- Nicknames: The Professor; Zoom Zoom; The Terrible Warrior
- Born: 19 July 1958 (age 68) Accra, Ghana
- Height: 5 ft 5 in (165 cm)
- Weight: Featherweight; Super featherweight; Lightweight

Boxing career
- Reach: 68 in (173 cm)
- Stance: Orthodox

Boxing record
- Total fights: 47
- Wins: 39
- Win by KO: 28
- Losses: 6
- Draws: 2
Medal record
Men's boxing
Representing Ghana
Commonwealth Games
Gold medal – first place	1978 Edmonton	Featherweight
All-Africa Games
Gold medal – first place	1978 Algiers	Featherweight

Azumah Nelson (born 19 July 1958, affectionately known as the Professor) is a Ghanaian former professional boxer who competed from 1979 to 2008. He was a two-weight world champion, having held the World Boxing Council (WBC) featherweight title from 1984 to 1987 and the WBC super-featherweight title twice between 1988 and 1997. He also challenged once for the unified WBC and International Boxing Federation (IBF) lightweight titles in 1990. At regional level, he held the ABU, and Commonwealth featherweight titles between 1980 and 1982. Widely considered one of the greatest African boxers of all time, he is currently ranked as the 69th greatest pound for pound boxer of all time by BoxRec.

== Career ==
Nelson competed at the 1978 All-Africa Games and 1978 Commonwealth Games, winning gold medals in featherweight at both events. He was awarded Amateur Boxer of the year by the Sports Writers Association of Ghana (SWAG) that same year.

However, Nelson was virtually unknown outside Ghana. Because of this, he was a decisive underdog when, on short notice, he challenged WBC featherweight champion Salvador Sánchez on 21 July 1982 at the Madison Square Garden in New York. Nelson lost the fight by a 15th-round technical knockout.

=== Featherweight champion ===
Nelson won all four of his fights in 1983, and he began 1984 by beating Hector Cortez by decision on 9 March in Las Vegas. Then, on 8 December of that year, he became boxing royalty by knocking out Wilfredo Gómez in round 11 to win the WBC featherweight championship. Behind on the three judges' scorecards, Nelson rallied in that round to become champion in Puerto Rico.

=== Super-featherweight champion ===
Nelson began 1988 by defeating Mario Martinez by a split decision over 12 rounds in Los Angeles, to win the vacant WBC super-featherweight title. Nelson was dropped in the 10th round of their encounter, and the decision was not well received.

On 1 December 1995, he defeated world champion Gabriel Ruelas in the fifth round to claim the title.

His first defense took place almost a year later, when he and Jesse James Leija had their third bout. Nelson retained the title with a sixth-round knockout. That was the only fight Nelson had in 1996, as had become his custom.

In 1997, Nelson lost the Lineal and WBC titles to Genaro Hernandez, when he beaten on points after 12 rounds.

== Legacy ==
The Azumah Nelson Sports Complex at Kaneshie in Accra was named after him.

== Biography ==
In 2014, a biography of Azumah Nelson, written by Ashley Morrison and titled The Professor – The Life Story of Azumah Nelson (ISBN 978-1628571059), was published by Strategic Book Publishing.

== Personal life ==
Nelson has six children. He is currently married to Priscilla Boakye Nelson.

In July 2018, Azumah organized a fight night to celebrate his 60th birthday at Bukom Boxing Arena. This event brought together fighters from highly-rated gyms in the country to fight contenders in their divisions. Some dignitaries, including formers sports ministers Nii Lante Vanderpuiye and Nii Amarkai Amarteifio, the British High Commissioner to Ghana Ian Walker, and Peter Zwennes, the president of the Ghana Boxing Authority, graced the occasion. In all, there were five bouts, three of which were won by knockout.

== Professional boxing record ==
46 fights	38 wins	6 losses
By knockout	27	1
By decision	11	5
Draws	2	

No	Result	Record	Opponent	Type	Round, time	Date	Location	Notes
46	Loss	38–6–2	Jeff Fenech	MD	10	24 Jun 2008	Hisense Arena, Melbourne, Victoria, Australia	
45	Loss	38–5–2	Jesse James Leija	UD	12	11 Jul 1998	Alamodome, San Antonio, Texas, U.S.	
44	Loss	38–4–2	Genaro Hernández	SD	12	22 Mar 1997	Memorial Coliseum, Corpus Christi, Texas, U.S.	Lost WBC super-featherweight title
43	Win	38–3–2	Jesse James Leija	TKO	6 (12), 1:58	1 Jun 1996	Boulder Station, Las Vegas, Nevada, U.S.	Retained WBC super-featherweight title
42	Win	37–3–2	Gabriel Ruelas	TKO	5 (12), 1:12	1 Dec 1995	Fantasy Springs Resort Casino, Indio, California, U.S.	Won WBC super-featherweight title
41	Loss	36–3–2	Jesse James Leija	UD	12	7 May 1994	MGM Grand, Las Vegas, Nevada, U.S.	Lost WBC super-featherweight title
40	Draw	36–2–2	Jesse James Leija	SD	12	10 Sep 1993	Alamodome, San Antonio, Texas, U.S.	Retained WBC super-featherweight title
39	Win	36–2–1	Gabriel Ruelas	MD	12	20 Feb 1993	Estadio Azteca, Mexico City, Distrito Federal, Mexico	Retained WBC super-featherweight title
38	Win	35–2–1	Calvin Grove	UD	12	7 Nov 1992	Caesars Tahoe, Stateline, Nevada, U.S.	Retained WBC super-featherweight title
37	Win	34–2–1	Jeff Fenech	TKO	8 (12), 2:20	1 Mar 1992	Princes Park Football Ground, Melbourne, Victoria, Australia	Retained WBC super-featherweight title
36	Draw	33–2–1	Jeff Fenech	SD	12	28 Jun 1991	The Mirage, Las Vegas, Nevada, U.S.	Retained WBC super-featherweight title; WBC awarded Fenech retrospectively the title on 7 Nov 2022 after WBC's recount
35	Win	33–2	Daniyal Mustapha Ennin	KO	4 (10)	16 Mar 1991	Polideportivo Principal Felipe, Zaragoza, Aragón, Spain	
34	Win	32–2	Juan Laporte	UD	12	13 Oct 1990	Sydney Entertainment Centre, Sydney, New South Wales, Australia	Retained WBC super-featherweight title
33	Loss	31–2	Pernell Whitaker	UD	12	19 May 1990	Caesars Palace, Las Vegas, Nevada, U.S.	For WBC and IBF lightweight titles
32	Win	31–1	Jim McDonnell	KO	12 (12), 1:40	5 Nov 1989	Royal Albert Hall, Kensington, London, England	Retained WBC super-featherweight title
31	Win	30–1	Mario Martínez	TKO	12 (12), 1:18	25 Feb 1989	Hilton Hotel, Las Vegas, Nevada, U.S	Retained WBC super-featherweight title
30	Win	29–1	Sidnei Dal Rovere	KO	3 (12), 2:04	10 Dec 1988	Accra Sports Stadium, Accra, Ghana	Retained WBC super-featherweight title
29	Win	28–1	Lupe Suarez	TKO	9 (12), 0:27	25 Jun 1988	Trump Plaza Hotel and Casino, Atlantic City, New Jersey, U.S.	Retained WBC super-featherweight title
28	Win	27–1	Mario Martínez	SD	12	29 Feb 1988	Great Western Forum, Inglewood, California, U.S.	Won vacant WBC super-featherweight title
27	Win	26–1	Marcos Villasana	UD	12	29 Aug 1987	Olympic Auditorium, Los Angeles, California, U.S.	Retained WBC featherweight title
26	Win	25–1	Mauro Gutierrez	KO	6 (12), 0:33	7 Mar 1987	Hilton Hotel, Las Vegas, Nevada, U.S.	Retained WBC featherweight title
25	Win	24–1	Danilo Cabrera	TKO	10 (12), 2:31	22 Jun 1986	Hiram Bithorn Stadium, San Juan, Puerto Rico	Retained WBC featherweight title
24	Win	23–1	Marcos Villasana	MD	12	25 Feb 1986	Inglewood Forum, Los Angeles, California, U.S.	Retained WBC featherweight title
23	Win	22–1	Pat Cowdell	KO	1 (12), 2:24	12 Oct 1985	National Exhibition Centre, Birmingham, West Midlands, England	Retained WBC featherweight title
22	Win	21–1	Juvenal Ordenes	TKO	5 (12), 2:45	6 Sep 1985	Tamiami Park, Miami, Florida, U.S.	Retained WBC featherweight title
21	Win	20–1	Wilfredo Gómez	KO	11 (12), 2:58	8 Dec 1984	Hiram Bithorn Stadium, San Juan, Puerto Rico	Won WBC featherweight title
20	Win	19–1	Hector Cortez	UD	10	9 Mar 1984	Las Vegas Convention Center, Las Vegas, Nevada, U.S.	
19	Win	18–1	Kabiru Akindele	KO	9 (15)	25 Nov 1983	National Stadium, Lagos, Nigeria	Retained Commonwealth featherweight title
18	Win	17–1	Alberto Collazo	TKO	2 (10), 1:40	23 Sep 1983	Richfield Coliseum, Richfield, Ohio, U.S.	
17	Win	16–1	Alvin Fowler	TKO	2 (10), 0:41	17 Aug 1983	Showboat Hotel and Casino, Las Vegas, Nevada, U.S.	
16	Win	15–1	Ricky Wallace	UD	10	12 Feb 1983	Public Auditorium, Cleveland, Ohio, U.S.	
15	Win	14–1	Irving Mitchell	TKO	5 (10), 2:24	31 Oct 1982	Great Gorge Resort, McAfee, New Jersey, U.S.	
14	Loss	13–1	Salvador Sánchez	TKO	15 (15), 1:49	21 Jul 1982	Madison Square Garden, New York, New York, U.S.	For WBC and The Ring featherweight titles
13	Win	13–0	Mukaila Bukare	TKO	6 (10)	26 Jun 1982	Kaneshie Sports Complex, Accra, Ghana	
12	Win	12–0	Charm Chiteule	TKO	10 (15)	28 Feb 1982	Woodlands Stadium, Lusaka, Zambia	Retained Commonwealth featherweight title
11	Win	11–0	Kabiru Akindele	KO	6 (15)	4 Dec 1981	Siaka Stevens National Stadium, Freetown, Sierra Leone	Retained Commonwealth featherweight title
10	Win	10–0	Brian Roberts	TKO	5 (15)	26 Sep 1981	Accra Sports Stadium, Accra, Ghana	Won vacant Commonwealth featherweight title
9	Win	9–0	Miguel Ruiz	TKO	4 (10)	18 Aug 1981	Stadium, Bakersfield, California, U.S.	
8	Win	8–0	Don George	KO	5 (10), 0:54	2 May 1981	Kaneshie Sports Complex, Accra, Ghana	
7	Win	7–0	Aziza Bossou	PTS	8	6 Mar 1981	Lomé, Togo	
6	Win	6–0	Joe Skipper	TKO	10 (12)	13 Dec 1980	Kaneshie Sports Complex, Accra, Ghana	Won African featherweight title
5	Win	5–0	David Capo	PTS	10	4 Oct 1980	Kaneshie Sports Complex, Accra, Ghana	
4	Win	4–0	Abdul Rahman Optoki	TKO	8 (12)	2 Aug 1980	Kaneshie Sports Complex, Accra, Ghana	Retained Ghanaian featherweight title
3	Win	3–0	Henry Saddler	TKO	9 (12)	1 Mar 1980	Kaneshie Sports Complex, Accra, Ghana	Won Ghanaian featherweight title
2	Win	2–0	Nii Nuer	TKO	3 (8)	2 Feb 1980	Kaneshie Sports Complex, Accra, Ghana	
1	Win	1–0	Billy Kwame	PTS	10	1 Dec 1979	Accra Sports Stadium, Accra, Ghana	

== See also ==
- List of featherweight boxing champions
- List of super featherweight boxing champions
- List of WBA world champions
- List of WBC world champions

Sporting positions
World boxing titles
Preceded by Wilfredo Gómez	WBC featherweight champion 8 December 1984 – 27 January 1988; Vacated	Vacant Title next held by Jeff Fenech
Vacant Title last held by Julio César Chávez	WBC super-featherweight champion 29 February 1988 – 7 May 1994	Succeeded by Jesse James Leija
Preceded by Gabriel Ruelas	WBC super-featherweight champion 1 December 1995 – 22 March 1997	Succeeded by Genaro Hernández
Awards
Previous: Buster Douglas; KO10 Mike Tyson	The Ring Magazine Upset of the Year; KO8 Jeff Fenech; 1992	Next: Simon Brown KO4; Terry Norris
