= George Foreman vs. Gerry Cooney =

Boxing match

The Preacher and the Puncher
- Date: January 15, 1990
- Venue: Boardwalk Hall, Atlantic City, New Jersey, U.S.

Tale of the tape
Boxer	George Foreman	Gerry Cooney
Nickname	Big	Gentleman
Hometown	Houston, Texas, U.S.	Huntington, New York, U.S.
Purse	$1,000,000	$1,000,000
Pre-fight record	64–2 (60 KO)	28–2 (24 KO)
Age	41 years	33 years, 4 months
Height	6 ft 4 in (193 cm)	6 ft 6 in (198 cm)
Weight	253 lb (115 kg)	231 lb (105 kg)
Style	Orthodox	Orthodox
Recognition	Former Undisputed Heavyweight Champion	

Result
- Foreman wins via 2nd-round technical knockout

George Foreman vs. Gerry Cooney, billed as The Preacher and the Puncher, was a professional boxing match contested on January 15, 1990.

== Background ==
Late in 1989, 40-year-old former undisputed heavyweight champion George Foreman and 33-year-old former top ranked contender Gerry Cooney agreed to terms on a January 15, 1990, fight. Foreman was three years and 19 fights into his comeback. At that time of his fight with Cooney, Foreman had won all 19 of his comeback fights, scoring 18 knockouts and only one opponent, journeyman heavyweight Everett "Bigfoot" Martin had managed to go the distance with Foreman. However, Foreman's opponents had ranged from complete unknowns to career journeyman (including Martin, David Jaco and Bert Cooper) with few notable victories, with his most decorated opponent being former light heavyweight and cruiserweight world champion, as well as future hall-of-famer Dwight Muhammad Qawi, who was dwarfed by Foreman and had never fought in the heavyweight division prior to that fight. With Cooney, however, Foreman was taking on a former heavyweight title contender who held victories over former contenders and Foreman adversaries Ken Norton, Ron Lyle and Jimmy Young, whose victory over Foreman in 1977 sent him into a 10-year retirement. Cooney's most notable bout had been his 1982 WBC title fight against Larry Holmes. After three consecutive knockout victories over the aforementioned Young, Lyle and Norton, Cooney was regarded as the number one challenger to Holmes's heavyweight title and viewed as having a legit chance at ending Holmes' undefeated record and capturing the title. Cooney fought a close fight with Holmes, but he tired during the later rounds and his corner stopped the fight in the 13th round after a barrage of punches from Holmes. After the Holmes fight, Cooney had fought only sporadically, in the seven plus years between his fight with Holmes and Foreman, Cooney had only partaken in four fights and had completely sat out the entire years of 1983, 1985, 1988 and 1989. Before his fight with Foreman, Cooney's last fight had been against then-undefeated The Ring and lineal heavyweight champion Michael Spinks two and a half year earlier on June 15, 1987, a fight Cooney would lose by knockout in the fifth round.

Despite criticism of both fighters' advanced ages, with critics in the media dubbing the fight "The Geezers at Caesars", there was some considerable hype surrounding the fight and it was decided that the bout would air on pay-per-view. There was even added drama with Cooney enlisting Foreman's long-time trainer Gil Clancy to train him for the fight.

== The Fight ==
The two men fought a close first round and traded jabs throughout. Towards the end of the first round, Cooney caught Foreman with a left hand that stunned Foreman, one of the few times during Foreman's comeback that he was hurt by an opponent. However, things would go downhill for Cooney in the second. Foreman would dominate the action in the second and sent Cooney down to the canvas after stunning him with a left uppercut and then landing several right hands followed by a straight left just past the midway mark. Cooney answered the referee's ten count and though clearly hurt from the exchange, was allowed to continue. Foreman then charged at the still staggering Cooney, delivered a sharp left uppercut that knocked Cooney out on his feet, followed by a quick right overhand before the referee could step in, sending Cooney face-first to the canvas. As Cooney was clearly unresponsive, referee Joe Cortez didn't bother making the ten count and immediately stopped the fight and Foreman was named the winner by technical knockout at 1:57 of the second round.

== Aftermath ==
Cooney would retire from boxing after the bout.

== Undercard ==
Confirmed bouts:

Preceded by vs. Everett Martin	George Foreman's bouts 15 January 1990	Succeeded by vs. Mike Jameson
Preceded by vs. Michael Spinks	Gerry Cooney's bouts 15 January 1990	Retired
