= Mike Tyson vs. Henry Tillman =

Boxing competition

The Road Back
- Date: June 16, 1990
- Venue: Caesars Palace, Paradise, Nevada

Tale of the tape
Boxer	Mike Tyson	Henry Tillman
Nickname	Iron	
Hometown	Catskill, New York	Los Angeles, California
Pre-fight record	37–1 (33 KO)	20–4 (14 KO)
Age	23 years, 11 months	29 years, 10 months
Height	5 ft 10 in (178 cm)	6 ft 3 1/2 in (192 cm)
Weight	217 lb (98 kg)	215 lb (98 kg)
Style	Orthodox	Orthodox
Recognition	WBA/WBC/IBF/The Ring; No. 2 Ranked Heavyweight; The Ring No. 7 ranked pound-for-pound fighter Former undisputed heavyweight champion	WBC; No. 9 Ranked Heavyweight

Result
- Tyson wins via 1st-round KO

Mike Tyson vs. Henry Tillman, billed as The Road Back, was a professional boxing match contested on June 16, 1990.

== Background ==
In his previous fight, Mike Tyson had lost his undisputed heavyweight title after being knocked out in the tenth round by 42–1 underdog James "Buster" Douglas in one of the biggest upsets in sports history. After a failed protest, Tyson's promoter Don King attempted to quickly gain a rematch with Douglas, but Douglas turned down King's offer and instead chose to face the number one contender Evander Holyfield. Left with little choice, Tyson was forced down the comeback trail. Former welterweight and middleweight champion Thomas Hearns and former heavyweight contender Renaldo Snipes emerged as possible opponents for Tyson, but it was announced on May 1 that Tyson would face 1984 Olympic Gold Medalist Henry Tillman, who had twice defeated Tyson as an amateur, effectively costing Tyson a spot on the U.S. Olympic team. In spite of his successful amateur career, Tillman's professional career was unimpressive, facing mostly unknowns and losing his only high-profile fight to Evander Holyfield by way of knockout. Tillman entered the fight as a 25–1 underdog and was given virtually no chance of defeating Tyson. The Tyson–Tillman fight was the second fight of a doubleheader event that also featured George Foreman taking on Adilson Rodrigues.

== The fight ==
Tyson charged at Tillman once the opening bell sounded, causing Tillman to quickly retreat. Tillman offered very little offense during the fight, instead spending the first minute of the fight circling the ring in an effort to avoid Tyson's powerful punches. Tyson eventually caught up to Tillman and began throwing powerful combinations at Tillman, causing Tillman to clinch several times whenever Tyson would mount a substantial amount of offense. With around 25 seconds left in the round, Tyson trapped Tillman in the corner. Tillman attempted to throw a jab, but Tyson countered with a strong right hand that dropped Tillman to the mat. Tillman remained on his back as the referee counted him out and Tyson was named the winner by way of knockout at 2:47 of the first round.

== Undercard ==
Confirmed bouts:

== Broadcasting ==
Country	Broadcaster
United States	HBO

Preceded by vs. Buster Douglas	Mike Tyson's bouts 16 June 1990	Succeeded by vs. Alex Stewart
Preceded by vs. Tim Morrison	Henry Tillman's bouts 16 June 1990	Succeeded by vs. Danny Blake
