= Rodney Moore (boxer) =

American boxer (b. 1965)

Personal information
- Nickname: Rockin'
- Nationality: (United States) American
- Born: Rodney E. Moore; February 21, 1965 (age 61) Wilmington, North Carolina
- Weight: Welterweight

Boxing career
- Stance: Orthodox

Boxing record
- Total fights: 50
- Wins: 38
- Win by KO: 20
- Losses: 10
- Draws: 2
- No contests: 0

Rodney Moore (born February 21, 1965) is an American boxer who fought in the super lightweight class. He was born in Wilmington, North Carolina, but later moved with his family to Philadelphia, Pennsylvania. Initially wanting to become a policeman, he changed his mind upon graduating from the I.S.T. Academy (Institute of Security and Technology) to become a boxer instead. Moore then worked as a security officer at Pennsylvania Community College and a disc jockey in various Philadelphia clubs while undergoing training as a boxer in his spare time.

While he was gradually becoming a boxer he committed himself to charity and the community for which he already received several certificates and awards.

Moore has had about 45 amateur bouts of which he won 43 (22 by knock-out), an achievement that earned him the Pennsylvania State Golden Gloves championship and the Sugar Ray Leonard Golden Gloves championship.

He then turned professional and became a world class contender. His first professional fight in 1983 pitted him against Tyrone Trice, in which he suffered a defeat. But he defeated Ali Saad Muhammad in 1988 to win the State Junior Welterweight title. Moore went on to defeat former world champions Livingstone Bramble in 1993 and Miguel Santana in 1989, as well as 1984 Olympic Gold Medalist Jerry Page.

Moore had his first title shot against Charles Murray for the IBF World Junior Welterweight title, then another one against Frankie Randall for the WBA World Junior Welterweight title, and finally one against Félix Trinidad for the IBF World Welterweight Championship. All in all, he had 50 professional fights of which he won 38, drew 2 and knocked out 20 opponents.

== Honors ==
Moore was awarded the trophy for "Boxer of the Decade" in 1998 and officially awarded the title "King of the Blue Horizon" for having fought 21 times at the legendary The Blue Horizon boxing hall. In 2004 he was inducted into the New Jersey Boxing Hall of Fame. Also in 2004, the Philadelphia City Council honored Moore for his boxing achievements as well as his work for the youth of Philadelphia. In 2005 he was selected into the "Middle Atlantic Boxing Outstanding Alumni" at the Middle Atlantic Boxing Association Annual Awards, and in 2007 he was inducted into the Pennsylvania Boxing Hall of Fame.
