= Maurice Blocker =

American boxer

Personal information
- Nickname: Thin Man
- Born: May 15, 1963 (age 63) Washington, D.C., U.S.
- Height: 5 ft 11 1/4 in (181 cm)
- Weight: Welterweight; Light middleweight

Boxing career
- Reach: 74 1/4 in (189 cm)
- Stance: Orthodox

Boxing record
- Total fights: 41
- Wins: 36
- Win by KO: 20
- Losses: 4
- No contests: 1

Maurice Blocker (born May 15, 1963) is an American former professional boxer who competed from 1982 to 1995. He was a two-time welterweight world champion, having held the WBC title from 1990 to 1991, and the IBF title from 1991 to 1992. He also challenged for the WBC super welterweight title in 1993.

== Professional boxing career ==
Blocker became a professional boxer in 1982. He lost his first opportunity to win a title in 1987 to Lloyd Honeyghan. In 1990 he captured the lineal and WBC welterweight titles from Marlon Starling, but lost them during his next fight to Simon Brown. In 1991 he defeated Glenwood Brown to capture the vacant IBF welterweight title. He defended the title successfully once against Luis Garcia. In 1993 moved up a weight class to fight Terry Norris for the WBC light middleweight title, he was TKO'd. Later that year took on Félix Trinidad to defend his IBF welterweight title but was KO'd in the 2nd. He retired in 1995.

== Professional boxing record ==
41 fights	36 wins	4 losses
By knockout	20	3
By decision	16	1
No contests	1	

No.	Result	Record	Opponent	Type	Round, time	Date	Location	Notes
41	Win	36–4 (1)	Bobby Butters	TKO	5 (10), 2:40	Apr 29, 1995	USAir Arena, Landover, Maryland, U.S.	
40	Win	35–4 (1)	Hector Lopez	TKO	4 (?)	Dec 10, 1994	Estadio de Beisbol, Monterrey, Mexico	
39	Loss	34–4 (1)	Félix Trinidad	KO	2 (12), 1:49	Jun 19, 1993	Sports Arena, San Diego, California, U.S.	Lost IBF welterweight title
38	NC	34–3 (1)	Steve Langley	NC	2 (10)	May 20, 1993	Ak-Sar-Ben, Omaha, Nebraska, U.S.	
37	Loss	34–3	Terry Norris	TKO	2 (12), 0:49	Feb 20, 1993	Estadio Azteca, Mexico City, Mexico	For WBC super welterweight title
36	Win	34–2	Luis Garcia	SD	12 (12)	Aug 28, 1992	Trump Plaza Hotel and Casino, Atlantic City, New Jersey, U.S.	Retained IBF welterweight title
35	Win	33–2	Glenwood Brown	SD	12 (12)	Oct 4, 1991	Resorts Casino Hotel, Atlantic City, New Jersey, U.S.	Won vacant IBF welterweight title
34	Loss	32–2	Simon Brown	TKO	10 (12), 2:10	Mar 18, 1991	Mirage Hotel & Casino, Paradise, Nevada, U.S.	Lost WBC welterweight title; For IBF welterweight title
33	Win	32–1	Marlon Starling	MD	12 (12)	Aug 19, 1990	Bally's Hotel & Casino, Reno, Nevada, U.S.	Won WBC welterweight title
32	Win	31–1	Saoul Mamby	UD	10 (10)	Feb 16, 1990	Clarion Hotel Ballroom, St. Louis, Missouri, U.S.	
31	Win	30–1	James Hughes	UD	10 (10)	Nov 3, 1989	Sands Casino, Atlantic City, New Jersey, U.S.	
30	Win	29–1	Willie Montana	TKO	6 (10)	Jul 27, 1989	Chase Park Plaza Hotel, St. Louis, Missouri, U.S.	
29	Win	28–1	Kent Acuff	TKO	1 (10)	Jun 21, 1989	Whitey Herzog's Powerhouse Nightclub, St. Louis, Missouri, U.S.	
28	Win	27–1	Lester Yarbrough	TKO	6 (10), 2:38	May 1, 1989	Omni International Hotel, St. Louis, Missouri, U.S.	
27	Win	26–1	Ruben Villaman	TKO	3 (8), 2:51	Oct 22, 1988	Bally's Las Vegas, Paradise, Nevada, U.S.	
26	Win	25–1	Orlando Orozco	TKO	5 (10)	Jun 27, 1988	Convention Center, Atlantic City, New Jersey, U.S.	
25	Loss	24–1	Lloyd Honeyghan	UD	12 (12)	Apr 18, 1987	Royal Albert Hall, London, England, U.K.	For IBF and WBC welterweight titles
24	Win	24–0	Adam George	TKO	2 (10)	Feb 21, 1987	Trump Plaza Hotel and Casino, Atlantic City, New Jersey, U.S.	
23	Win	23–0	Juan Alonso Villa	TKO	8 (10)	Jul 26, 1986	Capital Centre, Landover, Maryland, U.S.	
22	Win	22–0	Leland Hart	UD	10 (10)	Mar 21, 1986	Convention Center, Washington, D.C., U.S.	
21	Win	21–0	Efren Olivo	KO	1 (?)	Dec 7, 1985	Washington, D.C., U.S.	
20	Win	20–0	Pedro Vilella	UD	12 (12)	Jul 23, 1985	Convention Center, Washington, D.C., U.S.	Won WBC-NABF welterweight title
19	Win	19–0	Ricardo Bryant	UD	10 (10)	May 7, 1985	Tropicana Hotel & Casino, Atlantic City, New Jersey, U.S.	
18	Win	18–0	Clayton Hires	UD	10 (10)	July 10, 1984	Tropicana Hotel & Casino, Atlantic City, New Jersey, U.S.	
17	Win	17–0	Robert Adams	UD	10 (10)	Jun 2, 1984	D.C. Armory, Washington, D.C., U.S.	
16	Win	16–0	Terry Holmes	TKO	6 (10)	Jan 24, 1984	Tropicana Hotel & Casino, Atlantic City, New Jersey, U.S.	
15	Win	15–0	Miguel Mayan	TKO	4 (10)	Dec 27, 1983	Tropicana Hotel & Casino, Atlantic City, New Jersey, U.S.	
14	Win	14–0	Ernest Jackson	UD	10 (10)	Oct 22, 1983	Tropicana Hotel & Casino, Atlantic City, New Jersey, U.S.	
13	Win	13–0	Danny Paul	UD	10 (10)	July 5, 1983	Tropicana Hotel & Casino, Atlantic City, New Jersey, U.S.	
12	Win	12–0	Inocencio De la Rosa	TKO	1 (10), 2:30	May 3, 1983	Tropicana Hotel & Casino, Atlantic City, New Jersey, U.S.	
11	Win	11–0	Don Morgan	UD	10 (10)	Mar 1, 1983	Tropicana Hotel & Casino, Atlantic City, New Jersey, U.S.	
10	Win	10–0	Roberto Hernandez	UD	10 (10)	Jan 11, 1983	Tropicana Hotel & Casino, Atlantic City, New Jersey, U.S.	
9	Win	9–0	Jerome Artis	UD	8 (8)	Nov 30, 1982	Tropicana Hotel & Casino, Atlantic City, New Jersey, U.S.	
8	Win	8–0	Leo Davis	TKO	1 (?)	Nov 2, 1982	Tropicana Hotel & Casino, Atlantic City, New Jersey, U.S.	
7	Win	7–0	Larry Fleming	TKO	4 (6)	Jun 22, 1982	Tropicana Hotel & Casino, Atlantic City, New Jersey, U.S.	
6	Win	6–0	Tony Reed	TKO	1 (?)	May 23, 1982	Tropicana Hotel & Casino, Atlantic City, New Jersey, U.S.	
5	Win	5–0	Michael Ross	UD	4 (4)	Apr 27, 1982	Tropicana Hotel & Casino, Atlantic City, New Jersey, U.S.	
4	Win	4–0	Cliff Lee	TKO	6 (6)	Apr 13, 1982	Tropicana Hotel & Casino, Atlantic City, New Jersey, U.S.	
3	Win	3–0	Charles Triplett	TKO	1 (4), 0:53	Mar 30, 1982	Tropicana Hotel & Casino, Atlantic City, New Jersey, U.S.	
2	Win	2–0	Calvin Hardnett	TKO	1 (4), 0:46	Mar 9, 1982	Tropicana Hotel & Casino, Atlantic City, New Jersey, U.S.	
1	Win	1–0	Leon Gardner	TKO	2 (4), 0:18	Feb 16, 1982	Tropicana Hotel & Casino, Atlantic City, New Jersey, U.S.	

== See also ==
- Lineal championship
- List of world welterweight boxing champions

Sporting positions
Regional boxing titles
Preceded by Pedro Vilella	NABF welterweight champion July 23, 1985 – 1986; Vacated	Vacant Title next held by Luis Santana
World boxing titles
Preceded by Marlon Starling	WBC welterweight champion August 19, 1990 – March 18, 1991	Succeeded by Simon Brown
Vacant Title last held by Simon Brown	IBF welterweight champion October 4, 1991 – June 19, 1993	Succeeded by Félix Trinidad
