= Donovan Ruddock =

Jamaican-born Canadian boxer (born 1963)

Personal information
- Nickname: Razor
- Nationality: Canadian
- Born: December 21, 1963 (age 62) St. Catherine, Jamaica
- Height: 6 ft 3 in (191 cm)
- Weight: Heavyweight

Boxing career
- Reach: 82 in (208 cm)
- Stance: Orthodox

Boxing record
- Total fights: 47
- Wins: 40
- Win by KO: 30
- Losses: 6
- Draws: 1

Donovan "Razor" Ruddock (born December 21, 1963) is a Jamaican-born Canadian former professional boxer who competed from 1982 to 2001 and in 2015. He is known for his two fights against Mike Tyson in 1991, a fight against Lennox Lewis in 1992, and a fight with Tommy Morrison in 1995.

Ruddock is also known for his exceptionally heavy punching. Some of the best examples of his left hand and overall power were his knockouts of former WBA heavyweight champions James Smith in 1989, Michael Dokes in 1990, and Greg Page in 1992. His favoured weapon at the ring proved to be a highly versatile half-hook, half-uppercut left-handed punch he called "The Smash" which accounted for the majority of his knockout wins. It also happened to be his major downside throughout his career. Being a left-handed puncher fighting out of the orthodox stance, Ruddock did not throw right handed punches during most knockout flurries.

== Early life ==
Ruddock was born in St. Catherine, Jamaica. At age 11, he left Jamaica with his family and moved to Toronto, settling in the city's Weston neighbourhood. Ruddock attended Emery Collegiate Institute and Westview Centennial Secondary School, when he was a teenager.

== Amateur career ==
As an amateur boxer, Ruddock had a win over Lennox Lewis in March 1980, in Toronto at the Ontario Junior Boxing Championship, winning via a split decision (3:2) in the 75 kg weight class (165 lbs).

== Professional career ==
=== Early career ===
Ruddock turned pro in 1982, but his career started slowly, having only 11 fights between 1982 and 1985. He won eight of his first nine fights, but drew his fifth. More controversy followed in April 1985 when he lost to journeyman David Jaco, who would be KO'd by a young Mike Tyson the next year. After eight rounds Ruddock's corner threw in the towel when he complained of breathing problems. Jaco was awarded a TKO victory. It was discovered Ruddock had a rare respiratory illness and doctors told him his career would be over.

=== Return to the ring ===
To his doctors' surprise, Ruddock made a full recovery within 10 months and resumed his boxing career by winning nine straight fights. Eight were by KO, with the ninth a win by decision over former WBA heavyweight title-holder Mike Weaver. Ruddock would win the Canadian heavyweight championship in 1988 on a first-round knockout of Ken Lakusta.

In 1989, after two more wins by KO, a fight was arranged with another former WBA heavyweight champion—James "Bonecrusher" Smith. Ruddock was knocked down in round two but got up, regrouped and stopped Smith in the seventh round.

This victory placed him in line for a title bout against undisputed heavyweight champion Mike Tyson, scheduled for November 1989 in Edmonton, Alberta. Tyson, claiming illness, canceled and opted instead to fight James "Buster" Douglas in Tokyo in February 1990. Tyson would go on to lose, in one of the biggest upsets in boxing history.

=== Ruddock vs. Dokes ===
In 1990, Ruddock fought former heavyweight champion Michael Dokes. Ruddock went into the fight as underdog but put on one of the best performances of his career knocking out Dokes in the fourth round. Dokes appeared to be seriously stunned on the ropes after taking Ruddock's famous "Smash" left hook. A right hand followed, which appeared to put Dokes out, but Ruddock threw another two hooks to knock Dokes out cold for several minutes.

After another KO win over Kimmuel Odum in 1990, which included a controversial moment when he knocked Odum down with a left hook after the bell rang to end the second round, Ruddock had difficulty finding a marquee opponent. Ruddock hoped to fight Evander Holyfield (fresh from a KO win over James "Buster" Douglas for the heavyweight championship). Instead, Holyfield opted to fight 42-year-old George Foreman.

=== Ruddock vs. Tyson ===
With no big name opponent, Ruddock took a warm up fight against Mike Rouse in December 1990, winning by first round knockout. In January 1991, Mike Tyson accepted Ruddock's challenge and a fight was scheduled for March 18. It would pit Tyson, the number one contender, against Ruddock, who was number two, for the right to fight the winner of Holyfield–Foreman. Ruddock was dropped in round three but fought back until referee Richard Steele stopped the fight in Tyson's favour during round seven. Some fans were unhappy with the decision, and fights erupted in the stadium. Steele had to be escorted out of the ring after the angry protests.

=== Ruddock vs. Tyson II ===
A rematch was held June 28, 1991 and lasted a full 12 rounds. Tyson knocked Ruddock down twice during the bout, and won by unanimous decision. Both fighters were injured; Ruddock had a broken jaw and Tyson suffered a perforated eardrum. Sports Illustrated reported that Ruddock's jaw may have been broken as early as the fourth round. Tyson was magnanimous after his triumph, praising Ruddock as a great heavyweight: "Man this guy is tough, he'll be champion of the world one day if he stays dedicated and doesn't slip up."

=== Ruddock vs. Lewis ===
After losing to Tyson for the second time, Ruddock picked up victories over former heavyweight champion Greg Page and got a win over undefeated hope Phil Jackson; both fights again were won by KO. Those victories set up a bout with Lennox Lewis in London on Halloween 1992. The bout was an official WBC Final Eliminator and seen as an elimination bout for the opportunity to face the winner of the upcoming Bowe–Holyfield match. Ruddock was knocked out in the second round.

=== Ruddock vs. Morrison ===
More than two years after the Lewis defeat Ruddock came back in 1994 with a points win over Anthony Wade, which led to a fight with Tommy Morrison in 1995. In the first round he put Morrison down, but let the opportunity for an early stoppage slip, and was given a count himself in the second round after grabbing the ropes after being caught by a Morrison uppercut. Again, like the first Tyson fight, Ruddock was controversially stopped on his feet in the 6th round. He had been knocked down by a left hook in the same round.

=== Retirement ===
After the loss to Morrison, Ruddock disappeared for three years before returning once again in 1998. Ruddock was scheduled to challenge Vitali Klitschko for the WBO heavyweight world title in April 2000, yet was forced to withdraw at late notice due to injury. After building up a winning streak against journeymen opponents, Ruddock won the Canadian heavyweight title for a second time with a tenth round win over Egerton Marcus in October 2001, then retired with a record of 38 wins (28 KOs), 5 losses and 1 draw.

=== Comeback and second retirement ===
On March 28, 2015, Ruddock, aged 51, returned to the ring with a fifth round knockout win over Raymond Olubowale and scored a six round majority points decision over Eric Barrak two months later. Ruddock, in his third and final comeback bout, was defeated by a third round knockout by Dillon Carman on September 11, 2015 in a bid for the Canadian heavyweight title.

== Exhibition bout ==
Ruddock made a comeback to the ring at age 59 on November 11, 2023, when he fought 55-year-old James Toney, a former three-division world champion and hall of famer, in Kingston, Jamaica. The fight went all six rounds and was scored a draw, with the first two rounds being a standard three minutes, while the later four were shortened to two minutes. Both men were criticized for their poor athletic appearance and sluggish pace, as both were clearly showing their advanced age. Nevertheless, the fight went the distance.

== Legacy ==
Ruddock was ranked 70th on The Ring magazine's list of "The 100 Greatest Punchers of All-Time".

== Life after boxing ==
In the late 1990s Ruddock filed for bankruptcy after a number of failed investments—including a $1 million loss when his Fort Lauderdale nightclub "Razor's Palace" went under—had left him cash poor. A contract dispute ruined a close relationship with his brother and former manager, Delroy.

In 2006 Ruddock invented a non-electrical garbage compactor called The Boxer, which he hoped would become a success. Ruddock marketed the device he designed after becoming increasingly frustrated with the amount of waste his family was collecting, and sold it from his website RazorRuddock.com. As of November 2013, the site is no longer online and the product is listed on Amazon as unavailable with no indication for future availability.

== Professional boxing record ==
| 47 fights | 40 wins | 6 losses |
|---|---|---|
| By knockout | 30 | 5 |
| By decision | 9 | 1 |
| By disqualification | 1 | 0 |
| Draws | 1 | |

| No. | Result | Record | Opponent | Type | Round, time | Date | Location | Notes |
|---|---|---|---|---|---|---|---|---|
| 47 | Loss | 40–6–1 | Dillon Carman | KO | 3 (8), 2:05 | Sep 11, 2015 | Ricoh Coliseum, Toronto, Ontario, Canada | For Canada heavyweight title |
| 46 | Win | 40–5–1 | Eric Barrak | MD | 6 | May 22, 2015 | Colisée Isabelle-Brasseur, Saint-Jean-sur-Richelieu, Quebec, Canada | |
| 45 | Win | 39–5–1 | Raymond Olubowale | TKO | 5 (6), 1:00 | Mar 28, 2015 | Hershey Centre, Mississauga, Ontario, Canada | |
| 44 | Win | 38–5–1 | Egerton Marcus | TKO | 10 (12), 2:48 | Oct 12, 2001 | Convention and Civic Center, Niagara Falls, New York, U.S. | Won vacant Canada heavyweight title |
| 43 | Win | 37–5–1 | Harold Sconiers | SD | 10 | Apr 27, 2001 | Convention and Civic Center, Niagara Falls, New York, U.S. | |
| 42 | Win | 36–5–1 | José Ribalta | KO | 1 (10), 1:40 | Oct 8, 1999 | Turning Stone Resort Casino, Verona, New York, U.S. | |
| 41 | Win | 35–5–1 | Mike Sedillo | TKO | 8 (10), 1:19 | Jul 20, 1999 | Casino Windsor, Windsor, Ontario, Canada | |
| 40 | Win | 34–5–1 | Derek Amos | TKO | 1 (10) | May 27, 1999 | Mountaineer Casino Racetrack and Resort, Chester, West Virginia, U.S. | |
| 39 | Win | 33–5–1 | Anthony Willis | TKO | 6 (10), 2:40 | Feb 19, 1999 | Turning Stone Resort Casino, Verona, New York, U.S. | |
| 38 | Win | 32–5–1 | Tony LaRosa | TKO | 3 (10) | Jan 21, 1999 | Grand Casino Avoyelles, Marksville, Louisiana, U.S. | |
| 37 | Win | 31–5–1 | Rodolfo Marin | TKO | 8 (10) | Aug 11, 1998 | Miccosukee Resort & Gaming, Miami, Florida, U.S. | |
| 36 | Win | 30–5–1 | Tony Bradham | KO | 2 (10), 2:31 | Jun 26, 1998 | DePaul Alumni Hall, Chicago, Illinois, U.S. | |
| 35 | Win | 29–5–1 | Brian Yates | TKO | 4 (10) | Apr 16, 1998 | North Vernon, Indiana, U.S. | |
| 34 | Loss | 28–5–1 | Tommy Morrison | TKO | 6 (12), 2:55 | Jun 10, 1995 | Municipal Auditorium, Kansas City, Missouri, U.S. | For vacant IBC heavyweight title |
| 33 | Win | 28–4–1 | Anthony Wade | UD | 10 | Jan 29, 1994 | MGM Grand Garden Arena, Paradise, Nevada, U.S. | |
| 32 | Loss | 27–4–1 | Lennox Lewis | TKO | 2 (12), 0:46 | Oct 31, 1992 | Earls Court Exhibition Centre, London, England | For Commonwealth heavyweight title |
| 31 | Win | 27–3–1 | Phil Jackson | KO | 4 (12), 2:12 | Jun 26, 1992 | CSU Convocation Center, Cleveland, Ohio, U.S. | Won vacant IBC heavyweight title |
| 30 | Win | 26–3–1 | Greg Page | RTD | 8 (10), 3:00 | Feb 15, 1992 | The Mirage, Paradise, Nevada, U.S. | |
| 29 | Loss | 25–3–1 | Mike Tyson | UD | 12 | Jun 28, 1991 | The Mirage, Paradise, Nevada, U.S. | |
| 28 | Loss | 25–2–1 | Mike Tyson | TKO | 7 (12), 2:22 | Mar 18, 1991 | The Mirage, Paradise, Nevada, U.S. | |
| 27 | Win | 25–1–1 | Mike Rouse | KO | 1 (10), 2:37 | Dec 8, 1990 | Convention Hall, Atlantic City, New Jersey, U.S. | |
| 26 | Win | 24–1–1 | Kimmuel Odum | KO | 3 (10), 2:58 | Aug 18, 1990 | Broadway by the Bay Theater, Atlantic City, New Jersey, U.S. | |
| 25 | Win | 23–1–1 | Michael Dokes | TKO | 4 (12), 0:53 | Apr 4, 1990 | Madison Square Garden, New York City, New York, U.S. | Won WBA Inter-Continental heavyweight title |
| 24 | Win | 22–1–1 | James Smith | KO | 7 (10), 2:18 | Jul 2, 1989 | Cumberland County Memorial Auditorium, Fayetteville, North Carolina, U.S. | |
| 23 | Win | 21–1–1 | James Broad | TKO | 1 (10), 2:58 | Dec 6, 1988 | Metro Centre, Halifax, Nova Scotia, Canada | |
| 22 | Win | 20–1–1 | Reggie Gross | TKO | 2 (10), 1:36 | Jun 27, 1988 | Convention Hall, Atlantic City, New Jersey, U.S. | |
| 21 | Win | 19–1–1 | Ken Lakusta | KO | 1 (12) | May 28, 1988 | Saskatchewan Place, Saskatoon, Saskatchewan, Canada | Won vacant Canada heavyweight title |
| 20 | Win | 18–1–1 | Larry Alexander | KO | 2 (10), 2:08 | Apr 26, 1988 | The Showplace, Camden, New Jersey, U.S. | |
| 19 | Win | 17–1–1 | Eddie Richardson | KO | 4 (10), 1:42 | Nov 24, 1987 | Forum, Halifax, Nova Scotia, Canada | |
| 18 | Win | 16–1–1 | Juan Quintana | TKO | 2 (10), 0:51 | Aug 9, 1987 | State Theatre, Easton, Pennsylvania, U.S. | |
| 17 | Win | 15–1–1 | Carlos Hernandez | DQ | 7 (10), 0:27 | Jun 15, 1987 | Convention Hall, Atlantic City, New Jersey, U.S. | Hernandez disqualified for attempting to punch the referee |
| 16 | Win | 14–1–1 | Robert Evans | TKO | 5 (10), 0:58 | May 16, 1987 | State Theatre, Easton, Pennsylvania, U.S. | |
| 15 | Win | 13–1–1 | Mike Weaver | SD | 10 | Aug 23, 1986 | Cumberland County Memorial Auditorium, Fayetteville, North Carolina, U.S. | |
| 14 | Win | 12–1–1 | Al Houck | TKO | 1 (8), 1:30 | Jul 8, 1986 | Forum, Halifax, Nova Scotia, Canada | |
| 13 | Win | 11–1–1 | John Westgarth | KO | 7 (8) | May 28, 1986 | Alexandra Palace, London, England | |
| 12 | Win | 10–1–1 | Carlton Jones | KO | 1 (6), 2:04 | Feb 26, 1986 | St. Lawrence Market, Toronto, Ontario, Canada | |
| 11 | Loss | 9–1–1 | David Jaco | RTD | 8 (10), 3:00 | Apr 30, 1985 | Sportsplex, Dartmouth, Nova Scotia, Canada | |
| 10 | Win | 9–0–1 | Oscar Holman | UD | 8 | Oct 20, 1984 | Dartmouth, Nova Scotia, Canada | |
| 9 | Win | 8–0–1 | Ricardo Peterson | UD | 8 | Jul 31, 1984 | Sportsplex, Dartmouth, Nova Scotia, Canada | |
| 8 | Win | 7–0–1 | Cedric Parsons | TKO | 7 (8) | Feb 28, 1984 | Sportsplex, Dartmouth, Nova Scotia, Canada | |
| 7 | Win | 6–0–1 | Conroy Nelson | UD | 10 | Sep 25, 1983 | CNE Coliseum, Toronto, Ontario, Canada | |
| 6 | Draw | 5–0–1 | Phil Brown | SD | 6 | Apr 26, 1983 | Paul Sauvé Arena, Montreal, Quebec, Canada | |
| 5 | Win | 5–0 | Bill Hollis | UD | 6 | Apr 8, 1983 | St. Lawrence Market, Toronto, Ontario, Canada | |
| 4 | Win | 4–0 | Al Williams | KO | 1 (6), 1:53 | Aug 13, 1982 | Welland Arena, Welland, Ontario, Canada | |
| 3 | Win | 3–0 | Arthur Hall | MD | 4 | Jun 1, 1982 | Tropicana, Atlantic City, New Jersey, U.S. | |
| 2 | Win | 2–0 | Garland Tipton | KO | 2 (6) | Apr 24, 1982 | Columbus Event Centre, Toronto, Ontario, Canada | |
| 1 | Win | 1–0 | Wes Rowe | TKO | 4 (6) | Mar 20, 1982 | Columbus Event Centre, Toronto, Ontario, Canada | |

== Exhibition boxing record ==
| 1 fight | 0 wins | 0 losses |
|---|---|---|
| Draws | 1 | |

| No. | Result | Record | Opponent | Type | Round, time | Date | Location | Notes |
|---|---|---|---|---|---|---|---|---|
| 1 | Draw | 0–0–1 | James Toney | PTS | 6 | Nov 11, 2023 | National Indoor Sports Centre, Kingston, Jamaica | |

Sporting positions
Regional boxing titles
| Vacant Title last held by Willie de Wit | Canada heavyweight champion May 28, 1988 – September 1989; Vacated | Vacant Title next held by Tony Morrison |
| Vacant Title last held by Michael Dokes | WBA Inter-Continental heavyweight champion April 4, 1990 – August 1990; Vacated | Vacant Title next held by Wladimir Klitschko |
| Vacant Title last held by Trevor Berbick | Canada heavyweight champion October 12, 2001 – 2004; Vacated | Vacant Title next held by Patrice L'Heureux |
Minor world boxing titles
| Vacant Title last held by Phil Jackson | IBC heavyweight champion June 26, 1992 – December 1994; Vacated | Vacant Title next held by Tim Puller |
