= Richard Steele (referee) =

American boxing referee

- Born: January 26, 1944 (age 82)
- Occupations: former boxer, former USMC, former boxing referee, fight promoter

Richard Steele (born January 26, 1944) is an American retired boxing referee who was inducted into the International Boxing Hall of Fame.

A former member of the United States Marine Corps, Steele was a teammate of future world Heavyweight champion Ken Norton in the Marines. He began his career as an amateur boxer while with the Marines, compiling a record of 12 wins and 3 losses before launching a professional career. Steele was All Marines in 1963-64 and participated in the 1964 Olympic Trials, and was inducted into the U.S. Marine Corps Boxing Hall of Fame in 2017. He had 16 wins and 4 defeats as a professional fighter. He was also a contestant on To Tell the Truth on April 9, 1991, as the central character.

Steele began refereeing fights in the 1970s up until 2007, and he went on to referee in 147 world title fights around the world. His first major fight was the 1977 slugfest between unbeaten Mexican champions Carlos Zarate and Alfonso Zamora. Among his other notable fights were Aaron Pryor's knock out of Alexis Argüello in ten rounds of their rematch, the 1983 the Ring magazine Fight of the Year between Bobby Chacon and Cornelius Boza Edwards and Mike Tyson's defeat of Donovan Ruddock in 1991, Marvin Hagler and Thomas Hearns' 1985 middleweight championship bout, Hagler's 1987 loss to Sugar Ray Leonard, and the first of two fights between Julio César Chávez and Meldrick Taylor, which he stopped with 2 seconds remaining of the final round.

== Controversial fights ==
Steele was sometimes involved in controversial decisions. In the fight between Tyson and Ruddock he officiated, Steele elected to stop the fight in the seventh round as Ruddock appeared to be hurt by several stiff shots by Tyson. This, however, was in contrast to how the fight had gone up until that point with both fighters going back and forth and Tyson being hurt by several of Ruddock's shots. Steele's decision caused a near riot in the crowd, who were all infuriated by the call, and he had to be escorted from the ring for his own protection.

However, what is regarded as Steele's biggest controversy in his long career is the first fight between Julio Cesar Chavez and Meldrick Taylor. Taylor had been winning the fight entering the twelfth and final round and was ahead by enough of a margin on all three judges' scorecards that it would have been impossible for Chavez to win except by knockout. Despite his large lead Taylor had been taking a great deal of punishment from Chavez the entire fight, however, and the undefeated Mexican champion knocked Taylor down with seventeen seconds left in the fight. After Taylor got to his feet after a count of five while holding the ropes, Steele asked him twice if he was okay to continue. After Taylor failed to respond or let go of the ropes, instead looking at his corner, Steele stopped the fight with two seconds remaining and Chavez was declared the victor by technical knockout. Although many fans criticized his decision, considering how little time was remaining in the fight, Steele defended the decision by saying that he was only protecting Taylor from further injury and that "there's no fight worth a man's life". After the fight, Taylor was examined by ringside doctor Flip Homansky and found to have suffered a facial fracture and kidney damage so severe he was urinating pure blood. The decision was upheld after an appeal by Taylor's handlers.

== Outside of boxing ==
Outside the boxing ring, Steele runs his own boxing gym, the Richard Steele Boxing Club in Las Vegas, where he has taught young adults, and he also helps out with Salvation Army charities. In 1999, he was given an award by South African president Nelson Mandela for refusing to referee fights in South Africa while the Apartheid laws were still in use there. Steele also worked as a Pit Supervisor at the Golden Nugget in Las Vegas in the late 80s-90s.
