= Glenwood Brown =

American boxer

Glenwood Brown (born July 25, 1967) is an American former professional boxer in the welterweight (147lb) division.

== Amateur career ==
Brown trained at the Plainfield Boys Club in Plainfield, New Jersey and won the 1986 New York Golden Gloves 139 lb Open Championship. Brown defeated Raul Rivera of the Apollo Boys Club in the finals to win the Championship.

== Pro career ==
Nicknamed "The Real Beast", Brown turned pro in 1986 and lost his first title shot in 1991 by split decision to Maurice Blocker for the vacant IBF welterweight title. In his next fight in 1992 he took on WBA welterweight title holder Meldrick Taylor but lost a decision, even though Taylor was knocked down twice. Brown went on to win the IBO Middleweight Championship in 1995, but never fought again for a major title, and retired in 2000 following a TKO loss to Scott Pemberton. Career record: 48-12 (29 KOs).

Achievements
New title	IBO Middleweight Champion; August 19, 1995 – 1996; Vacated	Vacant Title next held by Freeman Barr
