= Frankie Randall vs. Julio César Chávez II =

Boxing match

Revenge: The Rematches: Randall–Chávez II
- Date: May 7, 1994
- Venue: MGM Grand Garden Arena, Paradise, Nevada, U.S.
- Title(s) on the line: WBC super lightweight title

Tale of the tape
Boxer	Frankie Randall	Julio César Chávez
Nickname	The Surgeon	El Gran Campeón Mexicano ("The Great Mexican Champion")
Hometown	Morristown, Tennessee, U.S.	Ciudad Obregón, Sonora, Mexico
Purse	$1,200,000	$300,000
Pre-fight record	49–2–1 (39 KO)	89–1–1 (77 KO)
Age	32 years, 7 months	31 years, 9 months
Height	5 ft 8 in (173 cm)	5 ft 7 in (170 cm)
Weight	140 lb (64 kg)	140 lb (64 kg)
Style	Orthodox	Orthodox
Recognition	WBC; Super Lightweight Champion; The Ring; No. 1 Ranked Light Welterweight; The Ring No. 8 ranked pound-for-pound fighter	WBC; No. 1 Ranked Super Lightweight; The Ring; No. 2 Ranked Light Welterweight; The Ring No. 9 ranked pound-for-pound fighter

Result
- Chávez wins by 8th-round split technical decision (77–74, 76–75, 75–76)

Frankie Randall vs. Julio César Chávez II was a professional boxing match contested on May 7, 1994, for the WBC super lightweight title. The fight was the featured bout on a boxing card promoted by Don King dubbed the Revenge: The Rematches.

== Background ==
Just over three months prior, Randall had scored a major upset over Chávez after being named the winner of their fight by split decision, ending Chávez's 90-fight unbeaten streak and taking his WBC super lightweight title in the process. Chávez had been deducted two points by referee Richard Steele for low blows in separate rounds, effectively costing Chávez a spit decision in his favor. Refusing to concede defeat, Chávez exercised his rematch clause immediately after his loss to Randall while announcing that the rematch would take place a little over three months later during the weekend of Cinco de Mayo stating "I will see everyone the weekend of May 5. I have lost the battle but not the war." Promoter Don King would supplement the Randall–Chávez rematch with three other championship rematches; Gerald McClellan vs. Julian Jackson for the WBC middleweight title, Azumah Nelson vs. Jesse James Leija for the WBC featherweight title and Simon Brown vs. Terry Norris for the WBC super welterweight title, in addition to a Ricardo López–Kermin Guardia WBC strawweight title fight, in a boxing card he billed as "Revenge: The Rematches."

Just before the fight, King, in an effort to reduce the confusion and controversy surrounding the subjectiveness of the scoring of fights, made a failed bid to have the Nevada State Athletic Commission display the three official scorecards for all to see between each round. Stated King "It should have happened a long time ago. We're the only sport in the dark ages where you have the perception of impropriety. Every score should be posted round by round." While NSAC chairman Dr. Elias Ghanem was in favor of the idea stating "I personally like it, but that's only my opinion", the request was brought up too late for the commission to implement it during the "Revenge: The Rematches" card.

== The fight ==
The fight was fought closely throughout its duration but ended in controversy during the eighth round. Heading into that round, the fight was practically even as Randall held a slim lead on two scorecards while Chávez was leading by a slim margin on the third. However, the fight was stopped with only three seconds remaining in the eighth after Randall's head accidentally struck Chávez's right eye, opening a large cut. Ringside physician Dr. Flip Homansky was called into the ring to tend to Chávez's gash and after Chávez failed to indicate to referee Mills Lane whether or not he wanted to continue, Homansky ordered the fight stopped stating after the fight that "it was my impression that Chavez didn't want to continue." Though Lane had ruled the butt accidental, a point was deducted from Randall in accordance with WBC rules after which the fight would go to the scorecards. Randall was the winner on one scorecard 76–75, but Chávez took the other two with scores of 77–74 and 76–75. Had WBC rules not mandated a point deduction for an accidental headbutt, the bout would have been ruled a split draw and Randall would have retained his title.

== Aftermath ==
Randall expressed his disappointment with how the fight ended at the post-fight press conference, claiming he "won the fight", that he would "protest" the decision and angrily stating "There was no way I should've been behind on anyone's card. I dominated. The decision was unjustly done. I shouldn't have to feel this way, like a loser. I was robbed." Chávez also expressed disappointment telling the media "I don't like winning this way. I don't want any controversy. I wanted to win without any doubt." King promised a third fight between Chávez and Randall by the end of the year proclaiming "Yes, indeed, we will have a rematch in this one", but the two fighters would not meet again until over a decade later in 2004.

== Fight card ==
Confirmed bouts:

Weight Class	Weight		vs.		Method	Round	Notes
Super Lightweight	140 lbs.	Julio César Chávez	def.	Frankie Randall (c)	TD-S	8/12	^{Note 1}
Middleweight	160 lbs.	Gerald McClellan (c)	def.	Julian Jackson	KO	1/12	^{Note 2}
Super Welterweight	154 lbs.	Terry Norris	def.	Simon Brown (c)	UD	12/12	^{Note 3}
Super Featherweight	130 lbs.	Jesse James Leija	def.	Azumah Nelson (c)	UD	12/12	^{Note 4}
Strawweight	105 lbs.	Ricardo López (c)	def.	Kermin Guardia	UD	12/12	^{Note 5}
Super Lightweight	140 lbs.	Giovanni Parisi	def.	Richie Hess	KO	2/10
Welterweight	147 lbs.	Meldrick Taylor	def.	Chad Broussard	KO	2/10
Lightweight	135 lbs.	Calvin Grove	def.	Ángel Aldama	UD	8/8
Heavyweight	200+ lbs.	James Stanton	def.	Anthony Willis	UD	8/8
Lightweight	135 lbs.	Christy Martin	vs.	Laura Serrano	D	6/6

^Note 1 For WBC Super Lightweight title
^Note 2 For WBC Middleweight title
^Note 3 For WBC Super Welterweight title
^Note 4 For WBC Super Featherweight title
^Note 5 For WBC Strawweight title

== Broadcasting ==
Country	Broadcaster
Thailand	Channel 7
United States	Showtime

Preceded by First bout	Frankie Randall's bouts 7 May 1994	Succeeded by vs. Juan Martin Coggi
Preceded by First bout	Julio César Chávez's bouts 7 May 1994	Succeeded by vs. Meldrick Taylor II
