= Julio César Chávez vs. Meldrick Taylor =

Boxing competition

Thunder Meets Lightning
- Date: March 17, 1990
- Venue: Las Vegas Hilton, Winchester, Nevada, U.S.
- Title(s) on the line: WBC and IBF light welterweight titles

Tale of the tape
Boxer	Julio César Chávez	Meldrick Taylor
Nickname	The Great Mexican Champion	TNT
Hometown	Ciudad Obregón, Sonora, Mexico	Philadelphia, Pennsylvania, U.S.
Purse	$1,400,000	$1,000,000
Pre-fight record	68–0 (56 KO)	24–0–1 (14 KO)
Age	27 years, 8 months	23 years, 4 months
Height	5 ft 7 in (170 cm)	5 ft 6 1/2 in (169 cm)
Weight	139 1/2 lb (63 kg)	139 3/4 lb (63 kg)
Style	Orthodox	Orthodox
Recognition	WBC light welterweight champion The Ring No. 1 ranked pound-for-pound fighter 3-division world champion	IBF light welterweight champion The Ring No. 5 ranked pound-for-pound fighter

Result
- Chávez won via 12th-round TKO

Julio César Chávez vs. Meldrick Taylor, billed as Thunder Meets Lightning, was a professional boxing match contested on March 17, 1990, for the WBC and IBF light welterweight championship. Its title was an allusion to the punching power of Chávez and fast hand speed of Taylor. Chavez won the fight by a controversial TKO of Taylor only two seconds before the end of the twelfth and last round, while he was behind on the score cards. The fight would later be named The Ring magazine's Fight of the Year for 1990 and later the "Fight of the Decade" for the 1990s.

== Background ==
Julio César Chávez had an undefeated record of 68–0 with 55 wins by knockout and had won world championships in three weight classes: super featherweight, lightweight and, the previous year against Roger Mayweather, the WBC light welterweight title.

Meldrick Taylor had won, at only 17 years, a gold medal at the 1984 Summer Olympics. He also had an undefeated professional record and had won the IBF light welterweight title in 1988 from Buddy McGirt.

This fight was the third title defense for both boxers and a unification fight of the WBC and IBF title.

The fight took place only one month after Mike Tyson's upset loss to James "Buster" Douglas.

== The fight ==
Taylor's hand and foot speed and boxing abilities gave him the early advantage, allowing him to begin building a large lead on points. He frequently hit Chávez with combinations and danced around the other man, making it difficult for Chávez, a skilled combination puncher who relied on an accumulation of damage to knock out his foes, to land more than one blow at a time. However, Chávez hit considerably harder than Taylor and little by little the damage done by Chávez' punches accumulated throughout the fight. Coming into the later rounds, Taylor was bleeding from the mouth and nose, his entire face was swollen, the bones around his eye socket had been broken and he had swallowed a considerable amount of his own blood. As he grew tired and could no longer outmaneuver Chávez, Taylor was increasingly forced into exchanging blows with Chávez, which gave Chávez a chance to add on more damage and increased his chances for a come from behind knockout victory. While Taylor was ahead on the score cards late into the fight, he was dazed, which was especially evident after the end of the 11th round when Taylor nearly went into Chávez' corner, until referee Richard Steele directed him back to his own.

Going into the final round, Taylor held a secure lead on the scorecards of two of the three judges, (Dave Moretti and Jerry Roth had the score 107–102 and 108–101 respectively for Taylor, while Chuck Giampa had Chávez ahead 105–104). However Taylor's trainer Lou Duva told him that he needed to win the final round to secure the fight. So despite his exhaustion, which included staggering around the ring and visibly wobbling as he moved (at one point early in the 12th round, Taylor fell to the canvas after missing Chávez with a wild left), Taylor continued to fight and exchange with Chávez at close range for much of the final round.

With about a minute left in the round, Chávez hit Taylor squarely with several hard punches and Taylor responded by mockingly feigning weakness. Finally, with 25 seconds left, Chávez landed a hard right hand that caused Taylor to stagger forward towards a corner. Chávez then managed to pin Taylor in the corner so Taylor could not easily escape and dropped Taylor with a right hand. Taylor rose from the canvas by using the ring ropes to pull himself up and continued holding onto them while he was given the mandatory standing 8-count. Referee Richard Steele then asked Taylor twice if he was okay, received no reaction and then signaled that he was ending the fight, resulting in a TKO victory for Chávez with only two seconds to go in the bout.

== Aftermath ==
To this day, Steele's decision to stop the fight remains debated.

Chávez' status as one of the best fighters of his era was cemented by the bout and for the next several years he was widely considered the best fighter in the world. His unbeaten streak would stretch to 89–0–1 before he suffered his first loss to Frankie Randall. Towards the end of his career Chávez began to cut easily, a tendency that cost him several fights. Like many boxers, he continued to fight even after time and physical damage had diminished his skills and would go in and out of retirement several times. He retired for good after a loss on September 17, 2005, in a bout where he claimed to have injured his hand. His final career record stands at 108–6–2. He holds several records, including for most title defenses and championship fights.

It's popularly believed that Meldrick Taylor was never the same physically or psychologically after the Chavez bout. Sportswriter William Nack claimed that Taylor's "prime" was literally beaten out of him. Dr. Flip Homansky, who examined Taylor following the fight, said that Taylor suffered broken bones behind the eye and received a transfusion for blood loss because of a cut lower lip.

Taylor won the WBA welterweight title in 1991, which he lost in 1992. He was knocked out in a rematch with Chávez in 1994, his last title fight.

Meldrick Taylor still resides in his native Philadelphia. On May 15, 2009, Taylor released a book titled "Two Seconds From Glory" detailing the fight with Julio Cesar Chávez along with other controversial subjects.

== Undercard ==
Confirmed bouts:

- Greg Page knocks out Martis Fleming at 1:36 of round 1.

== Broadcasting ==
Country	Broadcaster
United States	HBO

Preceded by vs. Alberto de las Mercedes Cortes	Julio César Chávez's bouts 17 March 1990	Succeeded by vs. Akwei Addo
Preceded by vs. Ramon Flores	Meldrick Taylor's bouts 17 March 1990	Succeeded by vs. Primo Ramos
Awards
Previous: Iran Barkley vs. Roberto Durán	The Ring Fight of the Year; 1990	Succeeded by Robert Quiroga vs. Akeem Anifowoshe
Previous: Iran Barkley vs. Roberto Durán	KO Magazine Fight of the Year; 1990	Succeeded by Robert Quiroga vs. Akeem Anifowoshe
