= Terry Norris vs. Donald Curry =

Boxing match

- Date: June 1, 1991
- Venue: Radisson Palm Springs Resort, Palm Springs, California, U.S.
- Title(s) on the line: WBC light middleweight title

Tale of the tape
Boxer	Terry Norris	Donald Curry
Nickname	Terrible	The Lone Star Cobra
Hometown	Lubbock, Texas, U.S.	Fort Worth, Texas, U.S.
Purse	$750,000	$115,000
Pre-fight record	28–3 (14 KO)	33–4 (24 KO)
Age	23 years, 11 months	29 years, 8 months
Height	5 ft 9 in (175 cm)	5 ft 10 1/2 in (179 cm)
Weight	151 lb (68 kg)	154 lb (70 kg)
Style	Orthodox	Orthodox
Recognition	WBC; Light Middleweight Champion; The Ring; No. 1 Ranked Light Middleweight	WBC; No. 8 Ranked Light Middleweight; Former 2-division world champion

Result
- Norris wins via 8th-round knockout

Terry Norris vs. Donald Curry was a professional boxing match contested on June 1, 1991, for the WBC super welterweight title.

== Background ==
After defeating the legendary Sugar Ray Leonard in February 1991, reigning WBC super welterweight champion Terry Norris entered negotiations the following month to face former welterweight and super welterweight champion Donald Curry, ultimately coming to an agreement to face each other on June 1 in Palm Springs, California. Though he was only 29-years old and had been one of boxing's top fighters in the mid to late 80s, Curry had gone 1–3 in his previous four title fights, including being knocked out by Michael Nunn in his previous fight, and was looked upon as being past his prime with the Norris fight being perceived as being his final opportunity to turn his career around. Curry accepted the criticism and hinted that he would retire should he lose, calling the fight "do or die."

The Norris–Curry fight co–main evented a boxing card along with a Meldrick Taylor vs. Luis Garcia fight. Taylor was making the first defense of his WBA welterweight title he had won in his previous fight against Aaron Davis. Garcia was the WBA's number-one ranked welterweight contender and Taylor's mandatory challenger.

== Card details ==
=== Taylor vs. Garcia ===
Taylor would defeat Garcia by split decision, with two judges having it for the champion 115–113 and 118–112 while another had it 117–114 for Garcia.

Preceded by vs. Aaron Davis	Meldrick Taylor's bouts 1 June 1991	Succeeded by vs. Ernie Chavez
Preceded by vs. Edison Martinez	Luis Garcia's bouts 1 June 1991	Succeeded by vs. Carlos Zambrano

=== Main event ===
Though Curry entered the fight as a sizable underdog whose best days appeared behind him, the fight was competitive through the first seven rounds as both fighters landed heavy shots against one another. Curry found success fighting Norris at long range, using his jab and blocking Norris' punches, though Norris often attacked Curry's body and landed often when he was able to get inside, however, Curry held his own and was able to hurt Norris with a big left hook in the sixth that Norris admitted stunned him but he was able to shake it off. The fight came to a head in the seventh round, Norris and Curry traded blows early on with Norris knocking out Curry's mouthpiece which resulted in a brief timeout that allowed Curry time to recover. After the round resumed, Curry fought well, hurting Norris again with a right hand that forced Norris to clinch Curry. However, Norris came on strong in the final 30 seconds and scored a questionable knockdown when he appeared to push Curry which resulted in Curry slipping to the canvas, though referee Chuck Hassett did not see the infraction and ruled it a knockdown, giving Curry a standing-eight count just as the round ended. Norris and Curry continued to trade heavy blows in the eighth when with around 30 seconds remaining, Norris countered a Curry left with an overhand right that landed flush and hurt Curry. A clearly dazed Curry attempted to clinch Norris but failed to do so as Norris continued to strike Curry, ultimately sending him down to his knees with consecutive right hands. Curry remained seated on the canvas as Hassett counted to 10, giving Norris the knockout victory with six seconds left in the round.

== Aftermath ==
Immediately following the fight, Curry announced his retirement stating "I did the best job I could possibly do. I’m closing it out. That’s it for me."

== Fight card ==
Confirmed bouts:

Weight Class	Weight		vs.		Method	Round	Notes
Super Welterweight	154 lbs.	Terry Norris (c)	def.	Donald Curry	KO	8/12	^{note 1}
Welterweight	147 lbs.	Meldrick Taylor (c)	def.	Luis Garcia	SD	12/12	^{note 2}
Super Middleweight	168 lbs.	Frankie Liles	def.	Ralph Ward	KO	4/10
Welterweight	147 lbs.	Gabriel Ruelas	def.	Pedro Mendoza	UD	10/10
Super Welterweight	154 lbs.	Nick Rupa	def.	Emilio Sotomayor	KO	1/6
Super Welterweight	154 lbs.	Richard Evans	def.	Alex Sifuentes	UD	4/4

^Note 1 For WBC Super Welterweight Title
^Note 2 For WBA Welterweight Title

== Broadcasting ==
Country	Broadcaster
United States	HBO

Preceded by vs. Ray Leonard	Terry Norris's bouts 1 June 1991	Succeeded by vs. Brett Lally
Preceded by vs. Michael Nunn	Donald Curry's bouts 1 June 1991	Succeeded by vs. Gary Jones
