= Julio César Chávez vs. Frankie Randall =

Boxing match

Super Grand Slam of Boxing: Chávez vs. Randall
- Date: January 29, 1994
- Venue: MGM Grand Garden Arena, Paradise, Nevada, U.S.
- Title(s) on the line: WBC super lightweight title

Tale of the tape
Boxer	Julio César Chávez	Frankie Randall
Nickname	El Gran Campeón Mexicano ("The Great Mexican Champion")	The Surgeon
Hometown	Culiacán, Mexico	Morristown, Tennessee, U.S.
Purse	$1,200,000	$300,000
Pre-fight record	89–0–1 (77 KO)	48–2–1 (39 KO)
Age	31 years, 6 months	32 years, 4 months
Height	5 ft 7 in (170 cm)	5 ft 8 in (173 cm)
Weight	140 lb (64 kg)	140 lb (64 kg)
Style	Orthodox	Orthodox
Recognition	WBC; Super Lightweight Champion; The Ring; No. 1 Ranked Junior Welterweight; The Ring pound-for-pound No. 2 ranked fighter	WBC; No. 1 Ranked Super Lightweight

Result
- Randall wins by split decision (116–111, 114–113, 113–114)

Julio César Chávez vs. Frankie Randall was a professional boxing match contested on January 29, 1994, for the WBC super lightweight title. The fight was the featured bout on a Don King-promoted boxing card dubbed the Super Grand Slam of Boxing.

== Background ==
In November 1993, promoter Don King announced the first boxing card for the soon-to-be-opened MGM Grand Las Vegas. Billed as the "Super Grand Slam of Boxing", the main event was announced to feature Julio César Chávez making the 14th defense of his WBC super lightweight title against Frankie Randall. Also featured on the card was Félix Trinidad vs. Héctor Camacho for Trinidad's IBF welterweight title, Simon Brown vs. Troy Waters for Brown's WBC Super Welterweight title, and Thomas Hearns taking on Dan Ward for the vacant NABF cruiserweight title. Originally, the card was to also feature a rematch between Azumah Nelson and Jesse James Leija for Nelson's WBC super featherweight title, but this was postponed until May and would take place on King's "Revenge: The Rematches" card.

Chávez, whose last major fight had been a controversial draw four months prior against Pernell Whitaker, paid little attention to Randall, a little-known 32-year-old journeyman fighter, who entered the fight as an overwhelming 16–1 underdog. Chávez instead focused much of his time during the pre-fight buildup discussing both the draw with Whitaker and a possible rematch with him that ultimately never came to be. Though given little chance of beating Chávez, who was undefeated in 90 professional fights, Randall remained confident he could earn the victory and used Chávez's perceived lacklustre performance against Whitaker as motivation stating "The Whitaker fight showed that movement is most effective against Chavez, and I’m going to use it to my advantage. Everybody says, ‘You’re past your prime.’ I'm at my prime. I'm strong, can do everything a young man can do. I still bang with the best."

== The fights ==
=== Undercard ===
The undercard featured wins for former 2 division champion Meldrick Taylor and future International Boxing Hall of Fame member Christy Martin.

=== Hearns vs. Ward ===
The first of the featured bouts saw former 4 division champion and WBC No. 2 ranked cruiserweight Thomas Hearns face Dan Ward for the NABF title vacated by Orlin Norris.

Hearns would make light work of Ward knocking him down with just over a minute left in the opening round. Ward was able to get back on his feet, but he appeared wobbly, prompting referee Toby Gibson to wave off the bout. After the fight, Ward would describe Hearns as "one of the best fighters ever to walk the earth."

Preceded by vs. Andrew Maynard	Thomas Hearns's bouts 29 January 1994	Succeeded by vs. Freddie Delgado
Preceded by vs. Keith McKnight	Dan Ward's bouts 29 January 1994	Succeeded by vs. Junior Spears

=== Brown vs. Waters ===
Super Grand Slam of Boxing:Brown vs. Waters
- Title(s) on the line: WBC super welterweight title

Tale of the tape
Boxer	Simon Brown	Troy Waters
Nickname	"Mantequilla"	"The Glamour With The Hammer"
Hometown	May Pen, Middlesex, Jamaica	Sydney, Australia
Pre-fight record	40–2 (30 KO)	21–3 (15 KO)
Age	30 years, 5 months	28 years, 9 months
Height	5 ft 9 in (175 cm)	5 ft 11 in (180 cm)
Weight	153 lb (69 kg)	153 lb (69 kg)
Style	Orthodox	Orthodox
Recognition	WBC; Super Welterweight Champion; The Ring; No. 1 Ranked Light Middleweight	WBC; No. 2 Ranked Super Welterweight; The Ring; No. 10 Ranked Light Middleweight

Result
- Brown defeated Waters via majority decision

The first of the three world bouts saw Simon Brown make the first defence of his WBC Super Welterweight belt against No.2 ranked contender Troy Waters, who had twice before fought for a world against Gianfranco Rosi and Terry Norris.

==== The fight ====
Brown was able to out boxer Waters, scoring with left jabs, combinations and body punches. Despite controlling the tempo of the fight, Waters was able to cut Brown over the right eye in the final round.

The fight went the distance, with Chung Dae-Eun having it a draw at 114–114, Jerry Roth scoring it 116–112 and Vince Delgado had it 118–111, both for Brown giving him a majority decision victory.

The AP scored it 116–112 for Brown.

==== Aftermath ====
Brown praised Waters as "as tough a guy as I've fought, he took everything I threw. I take my hat off to him, and I know I won the decision."

Preceded by vs. Terry Norris	Simon Brown's bouts 29 January 1994	Succeeded by vs. Terry Norris II
Preceded by vs. Robert Wangila	Troy Waters's bouts 29 January 1994	Succeeded by vs. Jorge Vaca Duenas

=== Ruddock vs. Wade ===
The next bout saw Donovan Ruddock make his first appearance in the ring since his second round stoppage loss to Lennox Lewis in October 1992.

Ruddock would dominate journeyman Anthony Wade, dropping him in the first round en route to a wide unanimous decision, winning every round on all three scorecards.

Preceded by vs. Lennox Lewis	Donovan Ruddock's bouts 29 January 1994	Succeeded by vs. Tommy Morrison
Preceded by vs. Brian Morgan	Anthony Wade's bouts 29 January 1994	Succeeded by vs. Ike Ibeabuchi

=== Trinidad vs. Camacho ===
Super Grand Slam of Boxing:Trinidad vs. Camacho
- Title(s) on the line: IBF welterweight title

Tale of the tape
Boxer	Félix Trinidad	Héctor Camacho
Nickname	"Tito"	"Macho"
Hometown	Fajardo, Puerto Rico	Bayamón, Puerto Rico
Pre-fight record	22–0 (19 KO)	44–2 (21 KO)
Age	21 years	31 years, 8 months
Height	5 ft 11 in (180 cm)	5 ft 6 1/2 in (169 cm)
Weight	147 lb (67 kg)	147 lb (67 kg)
Style	Orthodox	Southpaw
Recognition	IBF; Welterweight Champion; The Ring; No. 2 Ranked Welterweight	IBF; No. 8 Ranked Welterweight; 2 division champion

Result
- Trinidad defeated Camacho via unanimous decision

The penultimate bout saw Félix Trinidad make his third defence of his IBF welterweight belt against No. 8 ranked contender and former 2 division champion Héctor Camacho.

==== The fight ====
Camacho spent much of the bout trying to clinch the younger champion, while Trinidad controlled the action with flurries of body shots and combinations. Referee Joe Cortez, penalized him one point for this repeatedly throwing Trinidad into the ropes. He also docked Trinidad a point for hitting Camacho after the command to break.

At the end of 12 rounds all three judges scored it for Trinidad, 116–110, 117–109 and 119–106.

==== Aftermath ====
Speaking after the bout Camacho praised Trinidad saying, "He's pretty strong, I have to give him that. He shook me a couple times."

Preceded by vs. Anthony Stephens	Félix Trinidad's bouts 29 January 1994	Succeeded by vs. Yori Boy Campas
Preceded by vs. Lee Fortune	Héctor Camacho's bouts 29 January 1994	Succeeded by vs. Franco DiOrio

=== Main Event ===
The fight was a closely contested affair with Chávez aggressively attacking Randall body, while Randall proved to effectively counterpunch and landed big shots to Chávez's head throughout the fight. Chávez was penalized twice by referee Richard Steele for low blows, once in the seventh round and once in the eleventh, which would cost Chávez in the end, as without the lost points, Chávez would have earned a split decision victory himself as judge Abraham Chavarria's scorecard would have been in his favor 115–114. Randall would score the fights lone knockdown late in the eleventh round, catching Chávez with a right hand counterpunch that sent Chávez down on the seat of his pants though Chávez got back up at the count of three.

After 12 rounds, in a shocking upset, Randall would give Chávez the first loss of his professional career after being named the winner by split decision, having been named the winner on two scorecards with scores of 116–111 and 114–113, while Chávez was named the winner on the third scorecard 114–113.

== Aftermath ==
Angered by the loss, Chávez stated after the fight "I respect Frankie Randall. But, out of 12 rounds, he won three. I won nine rounds. He never hurt me. How could he win the fight? I'm very shocked. I have lost the battle but not the war. I'm out of here. I'm still champ!" Chávez also blamed Steele for his loss for deducting the two points during the fight, though when asked for comment after the fight simply commented "Look at the TV. That's all I've got to say." The Chávez–Randall was almost immediately announced to take place during the Cinco de Mayo weekend on May 7 four months later.

== Fight card ==
Confirmed bouts:

Weight Class	Weight		vs.		Method	Round	Notes
Super Lightweight	140 lbs.	Frankie Randall	def.	Julio César Chávez (c)	SD	12/12	^{Note 1}
Welterweight	147 lbs.	Félix Trinidad (c)	def.	Héctor Camacho	UD	12/12	^{Note 2}
Super Welterweight	154 lbs.	Simon Brown (c)	def.	Troy Waters	MD	12/12	^{Note 3}
Cruiserweight	190 lbs.	Thomas Hearns	def.	Dan Ward	TKO	1/12	^{Note 4}
Heavyweight	200+ lbs.	Donovan Ruddock	def.	Anthony Wade	UD	10/10
Super Lightweight	140 lbs.	Giovanni Parisi	def.	Mike Bryan	TKO	1/10
Welterweight	147 lbs.	Meldrick Taylor	def.	Craig Houk	KO	3/10
Bantamweight	118 lbs.	Tim Austin	def.	German Ruiz	TKO	4/6
Lightweight	135 lbs.	Christy Martin	def.	Susie Melton	TKO	1/6
Super Flyweight	115 lbs.	Andy Agosto	def.	Rodrigo Valenzuela	UD	6/6
Super Lightweight	140 lbs.	Terron Millett	def.	Jorge Valenzuela	KO	1/4

^Note 1 For WBC Super Lightweight title
^Note 2 For IBF Welterweight title
^Note 3 For WBC Super Welterweight title
^Note 4 For vacant NABF Cruiserweight title

== Broadcasting ==
Country	Broadcaster
Thailand	Channel 7
United States	Showtime

Preceded by vs. Andy Holligan	Julio César Chávez's bouts 29 January 1994	Succeeded by Rematch
Preceded by vs. Francisco Lopez	Frankie Randall's bouts 29 January 1994	Succeeded by Rematch
