= Aaron Davis vs. Meldrick Taylor =

Boxing match

A Tale of Two Cities
- Date: January 19, 1991
- Venue: Convention Hall, Atlantic City, New Jersey, U.S.
- Title on the line: WBA welterweight title

Tale of the tape
Boxer	Aaron Davis	Meldrick Taylor
Nickname	Superman	TNT
Hometown	The Bronx, New York, U.S.	Philadelphia, Pennsylvania, U.S.
Purse	$525,000	$525,000
Pre-fight record	32–0 (19 KO)	25–1–1 (14 KO)
Age	23 years, 9 months	24 years, 3 months
Height	5 ft 9 1/2 in (177 cm)	5 ft 6 1/2 in (169 cm)
Weight	146 lb (66 kg)	145 lb (66 kg)
Style	Orthodox	Orthodox
Recognition	WBA; Welterweight Champion; The Ring; No. 5 Ranked Welterweight	WBA; No. 7 Ranked Welterweight; The Ring; No. 2 Ranked Welterweight; The Ring No. 5 ranked pound-for-pound fighter Former light welterweight champion

Result
- Taylor wins via unanimous decision (116–111, 116–111, 115–112)

Aaron Davis vs. Meldrick Taylor, billed as A Tale of Two Cities, was a professional boxing match contested on January 19, 1991, for the WBA welterweight title.

== Background ==
On July 8th, 1990, reigning WBA welterweight champion Mark Breland defended his title against undefeated contender Aaron Davis. Though Davis was an impressive 29–0 going into the fight, he had faced mostly unheralded journeymen and came into the fight as a 8–1 underdog and was not expected to pose much of a threat to Breland. However, despite Breland injuring his right eye early in the fight, Davis held a narrow lead going into the 9th round when he connected with a right hand that practically knocked Breland out cold and gave him the upset victory. Breland expressed interest in a rematch with Davis, but instead took a lengthy hiatus and returned the following April fighting as middleweight. Davis expressed interest in a unification bout with Marlon Starling, but Starling would lose his title to Maurice Blocker two months later and never fought again.

Instead, it was announced in mid-December that Breland's longtime friend, Olympic teammate and Main Events stablemate Meldrick Taylor would challenge Davis for the title the following month in January 1991. Taylor was moving up in weight after having held the IBF light welterweight title for over a year before losing it in controversial fashion to Julio César Chávez in March. Taylor and his manager Dan Duva had been in deep negotiations with Chávez and his promoter Don King for a rematch tentatively scheduled to take place at The Mirage on February 2, 1992. King claimed Duva had already agreed to the Chávez rematch on Taylor's behalf and sued him citing breach of contract though Duva stated that he didn't consider the lawsuit "serious" and continued ahead with the Davis–Taylor fight.

== Fight Details ==
Taylor controlled the fight from the opening bell, staying on the inside of Davis, which prevented the taller and lankier Davis from landing much offense, and hammering him with body shots and combinations throughout the early rounds. Taylor was penalized one point in the second round but won all of the remaining first four rounds before Davis mounted a brief offensive comeback in the fifth, but that round would be the only round he would win unanimously on all three scorecards during the first 10 rounds. Having regained control following that fifth round, Taylor had built a wide lead on the scorecards and opted to avoid engaging Davis for the remaining two rounds, who won those two rounds as the retreating Taylor offered little offense and was booed by the crowd for his lack of action. After going the full 12 rounds, the decision was left to the judge's scorecards who each had Taylor the winner with two scores of 116–111 and one of 115–112.

== Fight card ==
Confirmed bouts:

Weight Class	Weight		vs.		Method	Round	Notes
Welterweight	147 lbs.	Meldrick Taylor	def.	Aaron Davis	UD	12/12	^{note 1}
Welterweight	147 lbs.	Curtis Summit	def.	Engels Pedroza	KO	10/10
Super Welterweight	154 lbs.	James McGirt	def.	Joseph Alexander	TKO	9/10
Super Featherweight	130 lbs.	Eddie Hopson	def.	Willie Richardson	TKO	1/6
Super Welterweight	154 lbs.	Julio César Green	def.	Drew Hayes	PTS	4/4
Super Lightweight	140 lbs.	Leavander Johnson	def.	Luis Castillo	TKO	2/4

^Note 1 For WBA Welterweight Title

== Broadcasting ==
Country	Broadcaster
Mexico	Imevisión
United Kingdom	Screensport
United States	HBO

Preceded by vs. Jorge Maysonet	Aaron Davis's bouts 19 January 1991	Succeeded by vs. Nino Cirilo
Preceded by vs. Primo Ramos	Meldrick Taylor's bouts 19 January 1991	Succeeded by vs. Luis Garcia
