= Revenge: The Rematches =

Boxing event

- Date: May 7, 1994
- Venue: MGM Grand Garden Arena, Paradise, Nevada, U.S.

Revenge: The Rematches was a boxing card that took place on May 7, 1994, when a quartet of rematch bouts took place at the MGM Grand in Paradise, Nevada. The Don King–promoted event was one of the largest boxing pay-per-view events ever staged. It has been called the best pay-per-view card ever and began the tradition of holding major boxing events featuring Mexican or Mexican-American fighters on the Cinco de Mayo weekend.

== The fights ==
=== Undercard ===
The card also included a WBC strawweight title bout between Kermin Guardia and Ricardo Lopez (P4P: 5th), which Lopez won by 12 round unanimous decision.

=== Nelson vs. Leija II ===
Azumah Nelson (The Ring: 1st) vs. Jesse James Leija (WBC: 2nd; The Ring: 6th featherweight) II for the WBC super featherweight title (Leija won by unanimous decision in 12)

Preceded by First bout	Azumah Nelson's bouts 7 May 1994	Succeeded by vs. Gabriel Ruelas
Preceded by First bout	Jesse James Leija's bouts 7 May 1994	Succeeded by vs. Gabriel Ruelas

=== Brown vs. Norris II ===
Revenge: The Rematches: Simon Brown vs. Terry Norris II
- Title(s) on the line: WBC super welterweight title

Tale of the tape
Boxer	Simon Brown	Terry Norris
Nickname	"Mantequilla"	"Terrible"
Hometown	May Pen, Middlesex, Jamaica	Lubbock, Texas, U.S.
Pre-fight record	41–2 (30 KO)	37–4 (23 KO)
Age	30 years, 8 months	26 years, 10 months
Height	5 ft 9 in (175 cm)	5 ft 9 in (175 cm)
Weight	154 lb (70 kg)	153 lb (69 kg)
Style	Orthodox	Orthodox
Recognition	WBC; Super Welterweight Champion; The Ring; No. 1 Ranked Light Middleweight; Two-division world champion	WBC; No. 1 Ranked Super Welterweight; The Ring; No. 5 Ranked Light Middleweight

Result
- Norris defeats Brown via unanimous decision

The second rematch saw Simon Brown face former champion Terry Norris for the WBC super welterweight title.

==== Background ====
Going into their first fight in December 1993, Norris was viewed as one of the best pound for pound boxers in the world. However Brown would shock the champion, knocking him down with a jab in the first round before stopping him in the fourth round, upsetting plans for Norris to face Pernell Whitaker. Since then Brown had made one successful defense against Troy Waters before facing Norris again.

Norris would be highly critical of his performance in their first fight saying during the build up to the rematch that when reviewing the fight "What I see most of all is the points where I kept dropping my hands, letting him catch me with that right hand. Watching the fight now, that's all I see me making all the mistakes and him capitalizing on them." He would also admit that he was no longer concerned by the pound for pound dissuasion saying "I don't care about that anymore. I was just saying I was the best because everyone else was saying it. Now, I just want to be the best I can to win my title back. Everybody was pumping me, saying I was the best pound-for-pound fighter, I was walking through fights, knocking guys out. I was in the invincible mode, which I'm not. I'm human. I was in a (Mike) Tyson mode, trying to knock my opponent out even though normally I'm not a knockout puncher, Simon Brown didn't beat me. I beat myself. He was just in the right place at the right time."

Brown meanwhile declined to declare himself one of the best in the world saying "I won't say like Terry did that I was the best, I'll let the public and writers decide. But I think I'm right there." He would also criticize Norris' comments that he beat himself saying "I never saw a guy complain as much as this guy. He's a crybaby. He's finding every excuse in the world to think he didn't lose that fight. I knocked him out."

==== The fight ====
In stark contrast to the first fight Norris would outbox Brown using a stick-and-move gameplan. In the 2nd round Norris hurt Brown early on with a straight left hand on the chin and followed it with three chopping right hands to the forehead. Brown would then rock the challenger in the 3rd with a right to the chin but Norris withstood the blow. Brown was sent against the ropes by a big left hook in the 4th. As the fight progressed a frustrated Brown would unsuccessfully goad Norris into over committing but the challenger remained disciplined.

At the end of 12 round Norris was awarded a unanimous decision victory with scores of 119–109, 117–111 and 116–112.

==== Aftermath ====
Speaking after the bout a victorious Norris said "I thought the difference was I was able to move, I boxed superbly. I think I surprised Simon Brown more than anybody by my ability to box, and I'm pleased with my performance.”

A defeated Brown meanwhile said "He outmoved me and he outboxed me. He moved a lot. I expected that, but he just wouldn't stand still at all."

Preceded by vs. Troy Waters	Simon Brown's bouts 7 May 1994	Succeeded by vs. Nestor Maciel
Preceded by vs. Armando Campas	Terry Norris's bouts 7 May 1994	Succeeded by vs. Luis Santana

=== McClellan vs. Jackson II ===
Revenge: The Rematches: Gerald McClellan vs. Julian Jackson II
- Title(s) on the line: WBC middleweight title

Tale of the tape
Boxer	Gerald McClellan	Julian Jackson
Nickname	"The G-Man"	"The Hawk"
Hometown	Freeport, Illinois, U.S.	Saint Thomas, U.S. Virgin Islands
Pre-fight record	30–2 (28 KO)	49–2 (45 KO)
Age	26 years, 6 months	33 years, 7 months
Height	6 ft 1 in (185 cm)	5 ft 11 in (180 cm)
Weight	160 lb (73 kg)	160 lb (73 kg)
Style	Orthodox	Orthodox
Recognition	WBC; Middleweight Champion; The Ring; No. 2 Ranked Middleweight	WBC; No. 2 Ranked Middleweight; The Ring; No. 5 Ranked Middleweight; Two-division world champion

Result
- McClellan defeated Jackson by 1st round KO

The penultimate bout on the card, saw WBC middleweight champion Gerald McClellan face former champion Julian Jackson.

==== Background ====
The pair had faced off almost exactly a year earlier, with McClellan stopping the favoured Jackson in the fifth round. Since then McClellan had made two defenses, both ending in 1st-round knockouts. Since his last bout he had parted from his long-term trainer Emanuel Steward and had replaced him with Willie Brown.

After initially weighing in 1/4 lb over the 160 lb middleweight limit, before returning an hour later at the limit, McClellan stated that this would be his last fight at middleweight.

Speaking before the bout McClellan staked his claim to the pound from pound number one status by saying "I look at myself as the best fighter in the world. This is going to be the fight where I make my name. This will be the best performance I have ever given."

==== The fight ====
Shortly after the opening bell McClellan landed an early strong jab to the chin and followed with a straight right that sent Jackson staggering. McClellan followed up with a furious barrage of punches, with Jackson barely able to respond. Eventually Jackson fell into the ropes prompting an 8 count from referee Joe Cortez. Jackson attempted to fight back but McClellan soon sent Jackson down again and this time he did not beat the count, ending the bout after only 83 seconds.

==== Aftermath ====
In his interview after the bout McClellan said "What separates me from the rest is that I'm mean. When Gerald McClellan gets a fighter hurt and in trouble, he's dead."

In January it was announced that McClellan move up to super middleweight to challenge WBC champion Nigel Benn. Shortly after, he vacated his belt.

Preceded by vs. Gilbert Baptist	Gerald McClellan's bouts 7 May 1994	Succeeded by vs. Nigel Benn
Preceded by vs. Eduardo Ayala	Julian Jackson's bouts 7 May 1994	Succeeded by vs. Luis Buitron

=== Randall vs. Chávez II ===
The fight was stopped with only three seconds remaining in the eighth after Randall's head accidentally struck Chávez's right eye, opening a large cut. Ringside physician Dr. Flip Homansky stopped the fight. Though the butt had been ruled accidental, a point was deducted from Randall in accordance with WBC rules and the fight went to the scorecards. Randall was the winner on one scorecard 76–75, but Chávez took the other two to win with scores of 77–74 and 76–75.

== Aftermath ==
The event was named Ring Magazine event of the year for 1994.

== Full card ==
Confirmed bouts:

Winner	Loser	Weight division/title belt(s) disputed	Result
(Mexico) Julio César Chávez	(United States) Frankie Randall	WBC World Super Lightweight title	8th round TD-S
(United States) Gerald McClellan	(United States Virgin Islands) Julian Jackson	WBC World Middleweight title	1st round KO
(United States) Terry Norris	(Jamaica) Simon Brown	WBC World Super Welterweight title	Unanimous decision
(United States) Jesse James Leija	(Ghana) Azumah Nelson	WBC World Super Featherweight title	Unanimous decision
(Mexico) Ricardo López	(Colombia) Kermin Guardia	WBC World Strawweight title	Unanimous decision
Preliminary bouts
(United States) Christy Martin	(Mexico) Laura Serrano	Lightwweight (6 rounds)	Unanimous Draw
(United States) Meldrick Taylor	(United States) Chad Broussard	Welterweight (10 rounds)	2nd round KO
(Italy) Giovanni Parisi	(United States) Richie Hess	Light welterweight (10 rounds)	2nd round KO
(United States) Calvin Grove	(Mexico) Ángel Aldama	Lightweight (8 rounds)	Unanimous decision
(United States) James Stanton	(United States) Anthony Willis	Heavyweight (8 rounds)	Unanimous decision

== Broadcasting ==
Country	Broadcaster
United States	Showtime

Awards
Previous: The Fan Man at Bowe-Holyfield II	The Ring Event of the Year; 1994	Next: Mike Tyson's return
