= Nevada Boxing Hall of Fame =

American non-profit organization

The Nevada Boxing Hall of Fame (abbreviated NVBHOF) is a non-profit 501(c)(3) organization founded in June 2012 by American sports broadcaster Rich Marotta. The company honors boxers and those in the industry who have significantly contributed to the state of Nevada, and donates proceeds toward Nevada-based/boxing-related charities and causes.

In December 2012, an inaugural class of 19 inductees was announced at a press conference in North Las Vegas at former professional boxing referee Richard Steele's boxing gym. Among the inductees were boxers Mike Tyson, Julio César Chávez, Larry Holmes, Oscar De La Hoya, Sugar Ray Leonard, trainers Eddie Futch and Freddie Roach, referees Mills Lane and Joe Cortez, as well promoters Bob Arum and Don King.

The organization hosted its first annual induction ceremony in August 2013 in Las Vegas, Nevada.

In 2016, Christy Martin became the first female boxer inducted into the Nevada Boxing Hall of Fame.

== Inductees ==
- 2013: Mike Tyson, Julio César Chávez, Larry Holmes, Oscar De La Hoya, Sugar Ray Leonard, Eddie Futch, Freddie Roach, Mills Lane, Joe Cortez, Bob Arum, and Don King
- 2015: Muhammad Ali, Lennox Lewis, Marvelous Marvin Hagler, Félix Trinidad, Marco Antonio Barrera, Roger Mayweather, and Eddie Mustafa Muhammad
- 2016: Christy Martin
- 2018: Jerry Roth
- 2020: Clarence Adams, Fernando Vargas, Andre Ward, Azumah Nelson, Danny Lopez, James Toney, Jose Luis Castillo, Julian Jackson, Mark Johnson, Miguel Cotto, Jose Sulaiman, Lorenzo Fertitta, Sammy Macias, and Carlos Padilla Jr.
