= Taishan Dong =

Chinese boxer

Taishan Dong 董建军
Personal information
- Nickname: The Great Wall
- Nationality: Chinese
- Born: Dong Jianjun; 18 May 1988 (age 38) Lanzhou, Gansu, China
- Height: 7 ft (213 cm)
- Weight: Heavyweight

Boxing career
- Reach: 84 in (213 cm)
- Stance: Orthodox

Boxing record
- Total fights: 6
- Wins: 6
- Win by KO: 3
- Losses: 0

Dong Jianjun (Chinese: 董建军; pinyin: Dǒng Jiànjūn; born 18 May 1988), known by his ring name Taishan Dong, is a Chinese undefeated professional boxer who fights at heavyweight.

== Amateur career ==
Dong initially started out in basketball, hockey and kickboxing, taking the ring name Taishan after the mountain of the same name. In February 2013, he floored Bob Sapp in a kickboxing fight held in Tokyo. Dong met with boxing promoter Liu Gang who persuaded him to take up professional boxing.

== Professional boxing career ==
After arriving to the US at the start of 2014 with ambitions to become a professional boxer, Dong met with attorney George Gallegos. Gallegos, who would later become his manager, introduced him to boxing trainer John Bray. Dong did not understand English at the time and Bray was unable to speak Chinese but the pair bonded over their shared interest in boxing. In July, Dong fought his professional debut against Alex Rozman (2-6-0), which Dong won in a second-round technical knockout. His next fight came in November, knocking out Tommy Washington Jr. (3-6-0) in just over two and a half first round minutes. In February 2015, Dong defeated Rory McCrary (3-2-0) in a unanimous decision over four rounds. Judges scored the fight 40-34, 40-34 and 39-35 in Dong's favor. His next fight came on the Canelo vs Kirkland undercard where he faced Jamal woods, Dong won the contest over 4 rounds in a majority decision win with the judges scoring the bout 40-36, 39-37 and one judge scoring it even at 38-38.

Dong's height has seen him being promoted as the "Yao Ming of boxing". He is currently signed to Golden Boy Promotions and trains with Buddy McGirt. Dong was offered a contract with Top Rank, who wanted to focus on expanding his reputation in Asia, but chose to sign with Golden Boy because they offered to develop him first in the US.

On Oct 14, 2017, Dong took part in a three-day talent tryout at the WWE Performance Center in Orlando, FL. On July 17, 2018, Dong was announced as part of the latest class of WWE recruits. On December 15, 2018, it was announced that he had left WWE voluntarily.

== Professional boxing record ==
6 Wins (3 knockouts, 3 decisions), 0 Losses, 0 Draws
Res.	Record	Opponent	Type	Rd., Time	Date	Location	Notes
Win	6–0	(Mexico) Daniel Arambula	UD	4	2015-12-18	Fantasy Springs Casino, Indio, California	
Win	5–0	(United States) Lance Gauch	KO	1 (4), 2:32	9 May 2015	Fantasy Springs Casino, Indio, California	
Win	4–0	(United States) Jamal Woods	MD	4	2015-05-09	Minute Maid Park, Houston, Texas	
Win	3–0	(United States) Roy McCrary	UD	4	2015-02-27	Fantasy Springs Casino, Indio, California	
Win	2–0	(United States) Tommy Washington Jr.	KO	1 (4), 2:35	2014-11-13	Fantasy Springs Casino, Indio, California	
Win	1–0	(United States) Alex Rozman	TKO	2 (4), 1:58	2014-07-18	Longshoremen's Hall, San Francisco, California	
