= Aaron Davis (boxer) =

American boxer

Personal information
- Nickname: Superman
- Born: April 8, 1967 (age 59) The Bronx, New York, U.S.
- Height: 5 ft 9 1/2 in (177 cm)
- Weight: Welterweight; Light middleweight; Middleweight

Boxing career
- Reach: 70 1/2 in (179 cm)
- Stance: Orthodox

Boxing record
- Total fights: 55
- Wins: 49
- Win by KO: 31
- Losses: 6

Aaron Davis (born April 8, 1967, in the Bronx, New York, United States) is a former professional boxer who held the WBA welterweight title.

== Amateur career ==
Davis won the 1986 New York Golden Gloves 147 lb Open Championship. Davis defeated Maurice Donovan of the Knights Community Center in the finals to win the Championship. In 1985 Davis advanced to the finals of the 147 lb Open division and was defeated by Bradley Austin of the Jerome Boys Club. Davis trained at Gleason's Gym in New York City and as well at the Morris Park Boxing Club in the Van Nest section of the Bronx.

== Professional career ==
Davis, known as "Superman", turned pro in 1986 and won his first 32 fights, including a 9th-round KO upset over Mark Breland to capture the WBA Welterweight Title in 1990.

He would lose the title the following year to former light-welterweight champion Meldrick Taylor. He would fight one more time for a major world title, challenging Julio César Vásquez for the WBA super welterweight title, losing by majority decision. He was never knocked out in a professional fight, and retired in 2002.

== Professional boxing record ==
| 55 fights | 49 wins | 6 losses |
|---|---|---|
| By knockout | 31 | 0 |
| By decision | 17 | 6 |
| By disqualification | 1 | 0 |

| No. | Result | Record | Opponent | Type | Round, time | Date | Location | Notes |
|---|---|---|---|---|---|---|---|---|
| 55 | Win | 49–6 | Ross Thompson | MD | 10 | Jul 23, 2002 | New Roc City, New Rochelle, New York, U.S. | |
| 54 | Win | 48–6 | Vinny Pazienza | TKO | 8 (10), 1:48 | Feb 9, 2001 | Foxwoods Resort Casino, Ledyard, Connecticut, U.S. | |
| 53 | Win | 47–6 | Luis Carmona | TKO | 8 (12), 1:55 | May 26, 2000 | Level Nightclub, Miami Beach, Florida, US | Won vacant NABA middleweight title |
| 52 | Win | 46–6 | Mack Willis | TKO | 3 (?) | Feb 19, 2000 | Georgia, U.S. | |
| 51 | Win | 45–6 | Alfonso Daniels | TKO | 6 (10) | Sep 9, 1997 | Fernwood Resort, Bushkill, Pennsylvania, U.S. | |
| 50 | Win | 44–6 | Tommy Small | KO | 1 (12), 2:33 | Jul 20, 1997 | The Claridge Hotel, Atlantic City, New Jersey, U.S. | Won vacant USBA light-middleweight title |
| 49 | Loss | 43–6 | José Luis López | MD | 10 | Jun 7, 1997 | ARCO Arena, Sacramento, California, U.S. | |
| 48 | Win | 43–5 | Tony Marshall | SD | 12 | Jan 21, 1997 | Grand Casino, Biloxi, Mississippi, U.S. | |
| 47 | Loss | 42–5 | Anthony Stephens | SD | 10 | Jun 15, 1996 | Casino Magic, Bay St. Louis, Mississippi, U.S. | |
| 46 | Win | 42–4 | Greg Cadiz | TKO | 2 (?) | Dec 30, 1995 | Wonderland Greyhound Park, Revere, Massachusetts, U.S. | |
| 45 | Win | 41–4 | Simon Brown | UD | 10 | Sep 16, 1995 | Tropworld Hotel Casino, Atlantic City, New Jersey, U.S. | |
| 44 | Loss | 40–4 | Bronco McKart | SD | 12 | Jun 2, 1995 | Foxwoods Resort Casino, Ledyard, Connecticut, U.S. | For WBC International light-middleweight title |
| 43 | Win | 40–3 | Apolinar Hernandez | RTD | 8 (10), 3:00 | Mar 29, 1995 | Lexington Avenue Armory, New York City, New York, U.S. | |
| 42 | Win | 39–3 | Dennis Milton | TKO | 3 (8), 3:00 | Jan 14, 1995 | Boardwalk Hall, Atlantic City, New Jersey, U.S. | |
| 41 | Loss | 38–3 | Tony Marshall | UD | 10 | Mar 31, 1994 | Bally's Park Place, Atlantic City, New Jersey, U.S. | |
| 40 | Loss | 38–2 | Julio César Vásquez | MD | 12 | Aug 21, 1993 | Salle des Étoiles, Monte Carlo, Monaco | For WBA light-middleweight title |
| 39 | Win | 38–1 | Harold Bennett | TKO | 2 (10), 2:43 | Jul 8, 1993 | Paramount Theater, New York City, New York, U.S. | |
| 38 | Win | 37–1 | Jose Antonio Martinez | TKO | 7 (10) | May 13, 1993 | Paramount Theater, New York City, New York, U.S. | |
| 37 | Win | 36–1 | Nick Rupa | UD | 10 | Mar 18, 1993 | Paramount Theater, New York City, New York, U.S. | |
| 36 | Win | 35–1 | Edwin Curet | TKO | 3 (10), 2:12 | Jan 27, 1993 | Paramount Theater, New York City, New York, U.S. | |
| 35 | Win | 34–1 | Craig Cummings | TKO | 7 (10), 1:31 | Oct 15, 1992 | Paramount Theater, New York City, New York, U.S. | |
| 34 | Win | 33–1 | Nino Cirilo | UD | 10 | Feb 28, 1992 | King Street Palace, Charleston, South Carolina, U.S. | |
| 33 | Loss | 32–1 | Meldrick Taylor | UD | 12 | Jan 19, 1991 | Boardwalk Hall, Atlantic City, New Jersey, U.S. | Lost WBA welterweight title |
| 32 | Win | 32–0 | Jorge Maysonet | TKO | 6 (10), 0:55 | Oct 30, 1990 | Pines Hotel, South Fallsburg, New York, U.S. | |
| 31 | Win | 31–0 | Billy Durbin | TKO | 8 (10), 2:53 | Sep 13, 1990 | Pioneer Hall, Duluth, Minnesota, U.S. | |
| 30 | Win | 30–0 | Mark Breland | KO | 9 (12), 2:56 | Jul 8, 1990 | Harrah's Hotel & Casino, Reno, Nevada, U.S. | Won WBA welterweight title |
| 29 | Win | 29–0 | Curtis Summit | UD | 10 | May 18, 1990 | Villa Roma, Callicoon, New York, U.S. | |
| 28 | Win | 28–0 | Reese Smith | TKO | 3 (?) | Jan 26, 1990 | Memorial Hall, Kansas City, Kansas, U.S. | |
| 27 | Win | 27–0 | Russell Mitchell | TKO | 6 (12), 1:52 | Nov 30, 1989 | Trump Plaza Hotel and Casino, Atlantic City, New Jersey, U.S. | Won NABF welterweight title |
| 26 | Win | 26–0 | Gene Hatcher | UD | 10 | Sep 14, 1989 | Beacon Theatre, New York City, New York, U.S. | |
| 25 | Win | 25–0 | Anthony Williams | KO | 7 (10), 2:40 | Jul 13, 1989 | Felt Forum, New York City, New York, U.S. | |
| 24 | Win | 24–0 | Jose Torres | TKO | 1 (10), 2:50 | May 25, 1989 | Felt Forum, New York City, New York, U.S. | |
| 23 | Win | 23–0 | Luis Santana | UD | 12 | Apr 13, 1989 | Felt Forum, New York City, New York, U.S. | Won vacant WBC Continental Americas welterweight title |
| 22 | Win | 22–0 | Jose Laercio de Lima | DQ | 4 (10), 2:55 | Feb 9, 1989 | Felt Forum, New York City, New York, U.S. | de Lima was disqualified for excessive holding |
| 21 | Win | 21–0 | Larry Nichols | TKO | 5 (10) | Nov 30, 1988 | Cobo Arena, Detroit, Michigan, U.S. | |
| 20 | Win | 20–0 | Horace Shufford | SD | 10 | Oct 27, 1988 | Felt Forum, New York City, New York, U.S. | |
| 19 | Win | 19–0 | Daniel Bicchieray | UD | 8 | Sep 19, 1988 | Palais des sports, Corbeil-Essonnes, France | |
| 18 | Win | 18–0 | Sammy Floyd | TKO | 7 (10) | Jul 31, 1988 | Felt Forum, New York City, New York, U.S. | |
| 17 | Win | 17–0 | Tyrone Moore | RTD | 8 (10), 3:00 | Jun 16, 1988 | Felt Forum, New York City, New York, U.S. | |
| 16 | Win | 16–0 | Judas Clottey | PTS | 8 | Apr 18, 1988 | Palais des Sports, Paris, France | |
| 15 | Win | 15–0 | Jesus Carlos Velez | TKO | 2 (8) | Feb 24, 1988 | Felt Forum, New York City, New York, U.S. | Velez sprained his knee and could not continue |
| 14 | Win | 14–0 | Boubeker Cherif | TKO | 5 (?) | Dec 21, 1987 | Stade Pierre de Coubertin, Paris, France | |
| 13 | Win | 13–0 | Brian Nitz | KO | 4 (8) | Nov 12, 1987 | Felt Forum, New York City, New York, U.S. | |
| 12 | Win | 12–0 | Warren Nelson | UD | 8 | Sep 3, 1987 | Felt Forum, New York City, New York, U.S. | |
| 11 | Win | 11–0 | Marvin McDowell | TKO | 4 (8) | Jul 23, 1987 | Felt Forum, New York City, New York, U.S. | |
| 10 | Win | 10–0 | Mbayo Wa Mbayo | PTS | 8 | Jun 6, 1987 | Saint-Nazaire, France | |
| 9 | Win | 9–0 | James Sudberry | TKO | 4 (8) | May 7, 1987 | Felt Forum, New York City, New York, U.S. | |
| 8 | Win | 8–0 | Joel Brival | PTS | 8 | Apr 27, 1987 | Paris, France | |
| 7 | Win | 7–0 | James Johnson | TKO | 2 (6), 2:57 | Mar 26, 1987 | Harrah's Marina Hotel Casino, Atlantic City, New Jersey, U.S. | |
| 6 | Win | 6–0 | Martin Kearney | TKO | 4 (8), 3:00 | Jan 29, 1987 | Felt Forum, New York City, New York, U.S. | |
| 5 | Win | 5–0 | Abdel Arik | PTS | 6 | Dec 13, 1986 | Paris, France | |
| 4 | Win | 4–0 | Jean Pierre Calvez | TKO | 2 (?) | Nov 6, 1986 | Paris, France | |
| 3 | Win | 3–0 | Terry Young | PTS | 6 | Aug 28, 1986 | Felt Forum, New York City, New York, U.S. | |
| 2 | Win | 2–0 | Keith Martin | TKO | 6 (6), 2:16 | Jul 10, 1986 | Felt Forum, New York City, New York, U.S. | |
| 1 | Win | 1–0 | Juan Torres | MD | 6 | May 15, 1986 | Felt Forum, New York City, New York, U.S. | |

== See also ==
- List of world welterweight boxing champions

Sporting positions
Regional boxing titles
| Vacant Title last held by Derrick Kelly | WBC Continental Americas welterweight champion April 13, 1989 – 1989; Vacated | Vacant Title next held by Genaro León |
| Preceded by Russell Mitchell | NABF welterweight champion November 30, 1989 – 1989; Vacated | Vacant Title next held by Lonnie Smith |
| Vacant Title last held by Raúl Márquez | USBA light-middleweight champion July 20, 1997 – 1997; Vacated | Vacant Title next held by Carl Daniels |
| Vacant Title last held by Jonathan Reid | NABA middleweight champion May 26, 2000 – 2000; Vacated | Vacant Title next held by Eric Mitchell |
World boxing titles
| Preceded by Mark Breland | WBA welterweight champion July 8, 1990 – January 19, 1991 | Succeeded by Meldrick Taylor |
Awards
| Previous: Lupe Gutierrez vs. Jeff Franklin; Round 12 | The Ring Round of the Year vs. Mark Breland; Round 9; 1990 | Next: no award given |
