= Legendary Nights =

2003 HBO boxing documentary television series

- Genre: Documentary
- Narrated by: Liev Schreiber
- Country of origin: United States
- Original language: English
- No. of episodes: 12

Production
- Running time: 30 minutes
- Production company: HBO Sports

Original release
- Network: HBO
- Release: March 5 – May 21, 2003

Legendary Nights is an American boxing documentary television series produced by HBO Sports. Each half-hour episode chronicles a single high-profile fight televised by HBO between 1981 and 2002, examining its build-up and aftermath through archival footage and interviews, narrated by Liev Schreiber. The twelve original episodes aired weekly from March 5 to May 21, 2003.

The series won the 2004 Sports Emmy Award for Outstanding Edited Sports Series/Anthology. A thirteenth episode, The Tale of Gatti–Ward, was produced a decade later and premiered in October 2013; it did not follow the format of the original series.

== Production ==
Legendary Nights was produced by HBO Sports during the tenure of network sports president Ross Greenburg. Each installment provides context on a notable HBO-televised bout before giving way to narration by Liev Schreiber, interspersed with archival footage and interviews with the participants.

== Episodes ==
Each episode was titled The Tale of, followed by the two fighters' surnames. The twelve original episodes covered the following bouts:

- The Tale of Leonard–Hearns – Sugar Ray Leonard vs. Thomas Hearns
- The Tale of Pryor–Argüello – Aaron Pryor vs. Alexis Argüello
- The Tale of Holmes–Cooney – Larry Holmes vs. Gerry Cooney
- The Tale of Hagler–Hearns – Marvin Hagler vs. Thomas Hearns
- The Tale of Hagler–Leonard – Marvin Hagler vs. Sugar Ray Leonard
- The Tale of Chávez–Taylor – Julio César Chávez vs. Meldrick Taylor
- The Tale of Tyson–Douglas – Mike Tyson vs. Buster Douglas
- The Tale of Holyfield–Bowe – Evander Holyfield vs. Riddick Bowe
- The Tale of Foreman–Moorer – George Foreman vs. Michael Moorer
- The Tale of Bowe–Golota – Riddick Bowe vs. Andrew Golota
- The Tale of De La Hoya–Trinidad – Oscar De La Hoya vs. Félix Trinidad
- The Tale of Lewis–Tyson – Lennox Lewis vs. Mike Tyson

The series premiered with The Tale of Leonard–Hearns on March 5, 2003, and concluded with The Tale of Lewis–Tyson on May 21, 2003. A thirteenth episode, The Tale of Gatti–Ward, covering the rivalry between Arturo Gatti and Micky Ward, premiered on HBO in October 2013.
