= Buddy McGirt =

American boxer, boxing trainer

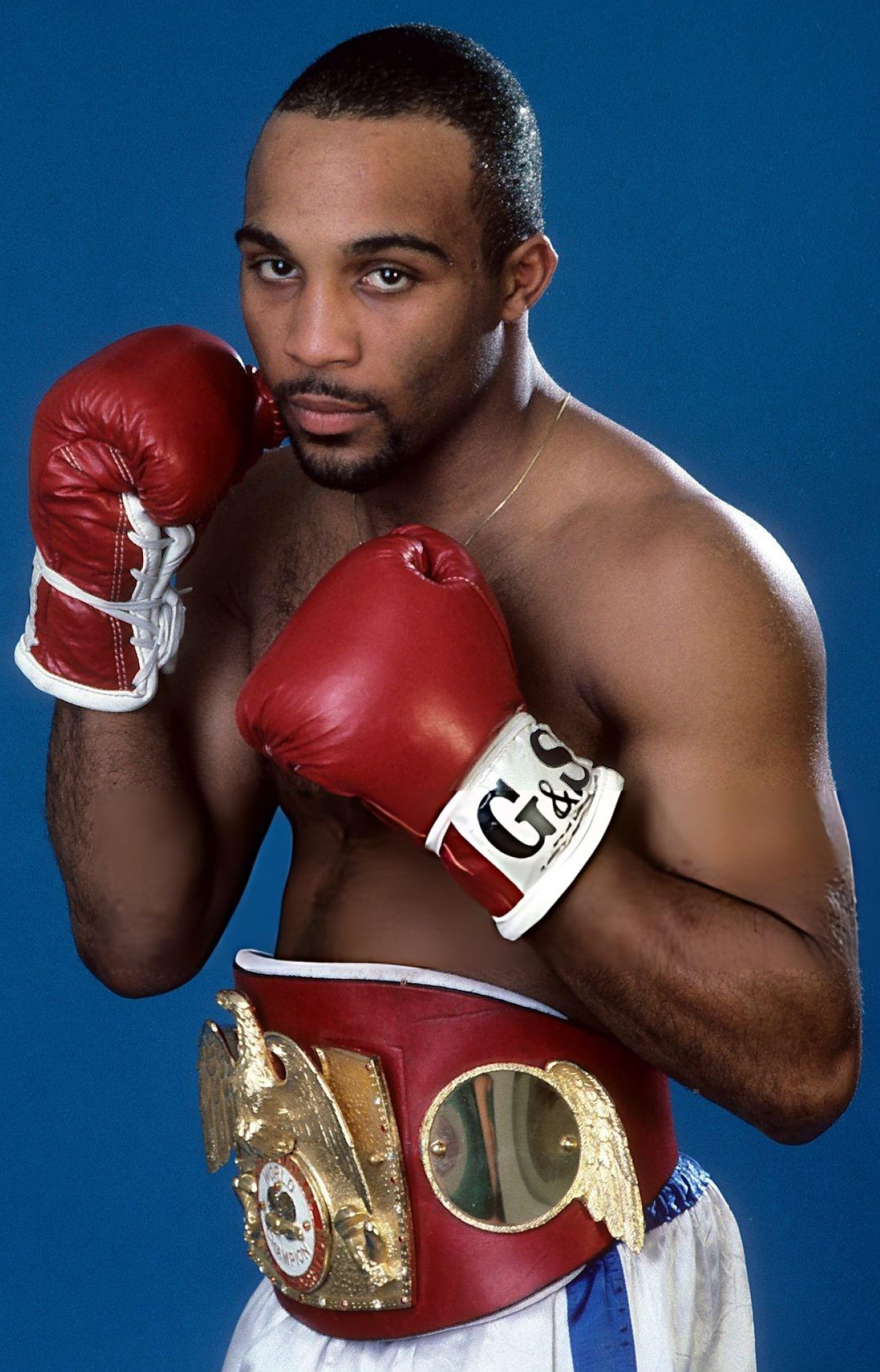
- McGirt in 1988

Personal information
- Nickname: Buddy
- Born: James Walter McGirt; January 17, 1964 (age 62) Brentwood, New York, U.S.
- Height: 5 ft 6 1/2 in (169 cm)
- Weight: Light welterweight; Welterweight; Light middleweight

Boxing career
- Reach: 70 1/2 in (179 cm)
- Stance: Orthodox

Boxing record
- Total fights: 80
- Wins: 73
- Win by KO: 48
- Losses: 6
- Draws: 1

James Walter "Buddy" McGirt (born January 17, 1964) is an American former professional boxer who competed from 1982 to 1997, and has since worked as a boxing trainer. He held world championships in two weight classes, including the International Boxing Federation (IBF) junior welterweight title in 1988, and the World Boxing Council (WBC) welterweight titles from 1991 to 1993.

As a trainer he has worked with multiple world champions, including Arturo Gatti, Antonio Tarver, Hasim Rahman, Paulie Malignaggi, and Sergey Kovalev. McGirt was named Trainer of the Year for 2002 by the Boxing Writers Association of America. He is currently coaching WBO middleweight champion Janibek Alimkhanuly.

== Professional boxing career ==
McGirt's aspirations of becoming a professional boxer existed at a young age."They said I was too small," McGirt says now. "They said I couldn't do it. I said I could. I said I'd be the first world champion from Long Island - so the guy they said couldn't do it is the one who did it." Fulfilling this childhood dream, he did so with a vengeance, turning professional in the year 1983, the year he graduated from Brentwood High School.

In 1988, McGirt defeated Frankie Warren, avenging what was at that time his only defeat, to win the IBF light welterweight title. In his second defense, he lost the title to Meldrick Taylor.

In November 1991, he defeated Simon Brown to win the Lineal and WBC welterweight titles.

At the beginning of 1993, McGirt was the world's top-ranked 147-pound boxer, one of the best pound-for-pound fighters in the world; but in the first week starting off the year he tore up his left shoulder while training. Without his money punch, the left hook, he had to box virtually one-handed for a total of 24 rounds in two championship fights. He won the first fight, but he lost his title in the second. McGirt lost the title to Pernell Whitaker in 1993. The following year, he again lost to Whitaker in an attempt to regain the title.

In 1997, he retired with a record of 73–6–1 (48 KO).

McGirt was inducted into the Suffolk Sports Hall of Fame on Long Island in the Boxing Category with the Class of 1992. He was inducted into the New Jersey Boxing Hall of Fame in 1998 and inducted into the International Boxing Hall of Fame in 2019.

== Training career ==
Following his retirement from the ring, McGirt worked as a trainer. His first champion was Byron Mitchell, who he started training six days before beating Manny Siaca for the WBA super middleweight title. McGirt would take up training full-time and became committed to the challenge of preparing other boxers to step into the ring. "Anybody can train but not many people can teach," McGirt said. "And that's what boxing is missing now—teachers. There are not many old-school trainers around." McGirt won the Boxing Writers' Association of America Trainer of the Year Award for 2002.

McGirt's son, James McGirt Jr., is also a professional boxer. McGirt also trained Kurt Pellegrino's boxing, his first venture into MMA, and trained heavyweight boxer Taishan Dong.

Buddy was trained and managed by Al Certo and Stuart Weiner. McGirt, and some of the fighters he trained are documented in the book "Bring it to the Ring: A Boxing Yearbook and Inspirational Message to Today's Youths." The book was published in 2005.

Buddy was interviewed in 2018 by Darren Carter on the "Pocket Party Podcast" that is available on iTunes, YouTube, Stitcher, and Anchor.

McGirt also began training Sergey Kovalev for his rematch against Eleider Alvarez (who knocked out Kovalev in 7th round in the 1st fight) and led him to a unanimous decision win with 116–112 on 2 cards and 120–108 on the 3rd.

== Professional boxing record ==
80 fights	73 wins	6 losses
By knockout	48	2
By decision	25	4
Draws	1	

No.	Result	Record	Opponent	Type	Round, time	Date	Location	Notes
80	Loss	73–6–1	Darren Maciunski	UD	10	Jan 21, 1997	Grand Casino, Biloxi, Mississippi, U.S.	
79	Win	73–5–1	Jerry Smith	PTS	10	Dec 16, 1996	Fort Collins, Colorado, U.S.	
78	Win	72–5–1	Kevin Tillman	UD	12	Oct 25, 1996	Casino Magic, Bay St. Louis, Mississippi, U.S.	Won vacant IBC light middleweight title
77	Win	71–5–1	Earl Jackson	KO	3	Sep 26, 1996	Denver, Colorado, U.S.	
76	Win	70–5–1	George Heckley	UD	10	Aug 12, 1996	City Center, Saratoga Springs, New York, U.S.	
75	Win	69–5–1	Allen Watts	SD	10	Jun 12, 1996	Trump World's Fair, Atlantic City, New Jersey, U.S.	
74	Win	68–5–1	Israel Figueroa	TKO	3 (8)	May 10, 1996	Suffolk Downs, Boston, Massachusetts, U.S.	
73	Loss	67–5–1	Andrew Council	TKO	9 (10), 2:25	Sep 30, 1995	Bally's Park Place, Atlantic City, New Jersey, U.S.	
72	Win	66–4–1	John Stewart	TKO	5 (10)	Jul 18, 1995	Medieval Times, Lyndhurst, New Jersey, U.S.	
71	Win	66–4–1	Joe Gatti	TKO	5 (10), 1:44	May 7, 1995	Grand Theatre, Biloxi, Mississippi, U.S.	
70	Win	65–4–1	Buck Smith	UD	10	Jan 10, 1995	Pontchartrain Center, Kenner, Louisiana, U.S.	
69	Loss	64–4–1	Pernell Whitaker	UD	12	Oct 1, 1994	Scope, Norfolk, Virginia, U.S.	For WBC welterweight title
68	Win	64–3–1	Kevin Pompey	SD	10	Aug 7, 1994	Villa Roma Resort, Callicoon, New York, U.S.	
67	Win	63–3–1	Kevin Pompey	UD	10	Jun 28, 1994	Meadowlands Convention Center, Secaucus, New Jersey, U.S.	
66	Win	62–3–1	Livingstone Bramble	UD	12	Apr 9, 1994	Scope, Norfolk, Virginia, U.S.	
65	Win	61–3–1	James Hughes	UD	10	Jan 4, 1994	War Memorial Auditorium, Fort Lauderdale, Florida, U.S.	
64	Win	60–3–1	Nick Rupa	UD	10	Nov 2, 1993	Steel Pier, Atlantic City, New Jersey, U.S.	
63	Loss	59–3–1	Pernell Whitaker	UD	12	Mar 6, 1993	Madison Square Garden, New York City, New York, U.S.	Lost WBC welterweight title
62	Win	59–2–1	Genaro Léon	UD	12	Jan 12, 1993	Paramount Theater, New York City, New York, U.S.	Retained WBC welterweight title
61	Win	58–2–1	Oscar Ponce	UD	10	Aug 14, 1992	Trump Plaza Hotel and Casino, Atlantic City, New Jersey, U.S.	
60	Win	57–2–1	Patrizio Oliva	UD	12	Jun 25, 1992	Acquaflash, Licola, Italy	Retained WBC welterweight title
59	Win	56–2–1	Delfino Marin	TKO	7 (10), 1:55	May 2, 1992	Fort Worth, Texas, U.S.	
58	Win	55–2–1	Simon Brown	UD	12	Nov 29, 1991	The Mirage, Paradise, Nevada, U.S.	Won WBC welterweight title
57	Win	54–2–1	Alfredo Ramirez	TKO	5 (10), 3:00	Oct 4, 1991	Steel Pier, Atlantic City, New Jersey, U.S.	
56	Win	53–2–1	Tyrone Moore	TKO	7 (10), 2:08	Jun 15, 1991	Charleston, South Carolina, U.S.	
55	Win	52–2–1	Frank Montgomery	TKO	9 (10)	Mar 22, 1991	Villa Roma Resort, Callicoon, New York, U.S.	
54	Win	51–2–1	Joseph Alexander	TKO	9 (10), 2:40	Jan 19, 1991	Convention Hall, Atlantic City, New Jersey, U.S.	
53	Win	50–2–1	Jose Leonard Bermudez	UD	10	Jul 22, 1990	Broadway by the Bay Theater, Atlantic City, New Jersey, U.S.	
52	Win	49–2–1	Charles Baez	TKO	2 (10), 2:45	May 25, 1990	Trump Plaza Hotel and Casino, Atlantic City, New Jersey, U.S.	
51	Win	48–2–1	Tommy Ayers	TKO	2 (10)	Mar 31, 1990	Trump's Castle, Atlantic City, New Jersey, U.S.	
50	Win	47–2–1	Miguel Santana	TKO	2 (10)	Jan 26, 1990	Steel Pier, Atlantic City, New Jersey, U.S.	
49	Win	46–2–1	Rafael Williams	UD	10	Dec 7, 1989	Madison Square Garden, New York City, New York, U.S.	
48	Win	45–2–1	Joe Manley	TKO	9 (10), 2:59	Nov 10, 1989	Villa Roma Resort, Callicoon, New York, U.S.	
47	Win	44–2–1	Gary Jacobs	UD	10	Aug 27, 1989	Felt Forum, New York City, New York, U.S.	
46	Win	43–2–1	Tony Baltazar	UD	10	Jul 9, 1989	Imperial Resort Hotel, Brookhaven, New York, U.S.	
45	Win	42–2–1	Orlando Orozco	KO	5 (10), 0:21	May 25, 1989	Felt Forum, New York City, New York, U.S.	
44	Win	41–2–1	Edwin Curet	UD	10	Mar 16, 1989	Felt Forum, New York City, New York, U.S.	
43	Win	40–2–1	Willie Taylor	UD	10	Feb 17, 1989	Mid-Hudson Civic Center, Poughkeepsie, New York, U.S.	
42	Win	39–2–1	Manuel De Leon	TKO	6 (10), 0:29	Jan 12, 1989	Felt Forum, New York City, New York, U.S.	
41	Loss	38–2–1	Meldrick Taylor	TKO	12 (12), 2:00	Sep 3, 1988	Broadway by the Bay Theater, Atlantic City, New Jersey, U.S.	Lost IBF light welterweight title
40	Win	38–1–1	Howard Davis Jr.	KO	1 (15), 2:45	Jul 31, 1988	Felt Forum, New York City, New York, U.S.	Retained IBF light welterweight title
39	Win	37–1–1	Frankie Warren	TKO	12 (15), 1:32	Feb 14, 1988	Memorial Coliseum, Corpus Christi, Texas, U.S.	Won vacant IBF light welterweight title
38	Win	36–1–1	John Sinegal	TKO	1 (10), 1:54	Dec 17, 1987	Felt Forum, New York City, New York, U.S.	
37	Win	35–1–1	Eduardo Lugo	KO	3 (10)	Oct 1, 1987	Felt Forum, New York City, New York, U.S.	
36	Win	34–1–1	Roger Brown	KO	5 (10), 1:05	Aug 6, 1987	Felt Forum, New York City, New York, U.S.	
35	Win	33–1–1	Sergio Aguirre	KO	2 (10), 2:28	Jun 18, 1987	Felt Forum, New York City, New York, U.S.	
34	Win	32–1–1	Vincent Releford	TKO	12 (12), 2:59	Apr 24, 1987	Empire State Plaza, Albany, New York, U.S.	Won vacant WBC Continental Americas light welterweight title
33	Win	31–1–1	Eric Martin	UD	10	Jan 29, 1987	Felt Forum, New York City, New York, U.S.	
32	Win	30–1–1	Joe Edens	TKO	8 (10), 2:54	Jan 6, 1987	Premier Center, Sterling Heights, Michigan, U.S.	
31	Win	29–1–1	Saoul Mamby	UD	10	Sep 25, 1986	Felt Forum, New York City, New York, U.S.	
30	Loss	28–1–1	Frankie Warren	UD	10	Jul 20, 1986	Bayfront Plaza Convention Center, Corpus Christi, Texas, U.S.	
29	Win	28–0–1	Rudy Fuentes	TKO	8 (10), 2:19	Jun 23, 1986	Madison Square Garden, New York City, New York, U.S.	
28	Win	27–0–1	Ricky Young	TKO	10 (10), 0:50	May 20, 1986	Madison Square Garden, New York City, New York, U.S.	
27	Win	26–0–1	Kelly Koble	TKO	4 (10)	Apr 11, 1986	Memorial Sports Arena, Los Angeles, California, U.S.	
26	Win	25–0–1	Dave Odem	TKO	1 (10), 2:09	Mar 10, 1986	Nassau Veterans Memorial Coliseum, Hempstead, New York, U.S.	
25	Win	24–0–1	Joey Ferrell	UD	10	Feb 21, 1986	Trump Plaza Hotel and Casino, Atlantic City, New Jersey, U.S.	
24	Win	23–0–1	Sugar Boy Nando	TKO	5 (12)	Dec 21, 1985	Convention Center, Miami Beach, Florida, U.S.	Won vacant WBC Continental Americas light welterweight title
23	Win	22–0–1	Jose Luis Alejandro	TKO	7 (10), 1:26	Oct 4, 1985	Felt Forum, New York City, New York, U.S.	
22	Win	21–0–1	Willie Rodriguez	TKO	7 (10), 1:35	Aug 29, 1985	Felt Forum, New York City, New York, U.S.	
21	Win	20–0–1	Ralph Twinning	TKO	1 (10), 1:02	Jul 11, 1985	Felt Forum, New York City, New York, U.S.	
20	Win	19–0–1	Allen Braswell	UD	10	May 24, 1985	Felt Forum, New York City, New York, U.S.	
19	Win	18–0–1	Mike Blunt	KO	1	Mar 8, 1985	Catholic Youth Center, Scranton, Pennsylvania, U.S.	
18	Win	17–0–1	Felix Nance	TKO	9 (10), 1:58	Dec 14, 1984	Nassau Veterans Memorial Coliseum, Hempstead, New York, U.S.	
17	Win	16–0–1	Manuel Toribio	KO	3 (10), 1:40	Jul 12, 1984	Felt Forum, New York City, New York, U.S.	
16	Win	15–0–1	Pete Padilla	TKO	10 (10), 1:07	May 25, 1984	Felt Forum, New York City, New York, U.S.	
15	Win	14–0–1	Jake Torrance	TKO	6 (10), 3:00	Mar 30, 1984	Felt Forum, New York City, New York, U.S.	
14	Win	13–0–1	Felix Nance	TKO	2 (10), 1:36	Feb 17, 1984	Felt Forum, New York City, New York, U.S.	
13	Win	12–0–1	Chi Chi Hernandez	TKO	2 (10), 1:33	Dec 9, 1983	Felt Forum, New York City, New York, U.S.	
12	Win	11–0–1	Larry Fleming	TKO	3 (10), 2:26	Sep 30, 1983	Felt Forum, New York City, New York, U.S.	
11	Win	10–0–1	Leslie Toney	TKO	1 (10)	Sep 6, 1983	Tropicana, Atlantic City, New Jersey, U.S.	
10	Win	9–0–1	Darnell Smith	TKO	1	May 26, 1983	Newark, New Jersey, U.S.	
9	Win	8–0–1	Tom Dietz	TKO	3	Apr 21, 1983	Symphony Hall, Newark, New Jersey, U.S.	
8	Win	7–0–1	Cesar Guzman	PTS	6	Feb 16, 1983	Brendan Byrne Arena, East Rutherford, New Jersey, U.S.	
7	Win	6–0–1	Dave Bolden	KO	5	Dec 30, 1982	Embassy Hall, North Bergen, New Jersey, U.S.	
6	Win	5–0–1	Michael Clark	TKO	1	Nov 7, 1982	The Great Gorge Playboy Club Hotel, Vernon, New Jersey, U.S.	
5	Win	4–0–1	Ramon Rivera	KO	1 (4)	Sep 30, 1982	Ice World, Totowa, New Jersey, U.S.	
4	Win	3–0–1	Michael Evans	KO	1	Sep 21, 1982	Embassy Hall, North Bergen, New Jersey, U.S.	
3	Win	2–0–1	Michael Palms	KO	2 (4)	Aug 7, 1982	Spectrum, Philadelphia, Pennsylvania, U.S.	
2	Win	1–0–1	Michael Palms	TKO	3 (4)	Mar 22, 1982	Atlantic City, New Jersey, U.S.	
1	Draw	0–0–1	Lamont Haithcoach	PTS	4	Mar 2, 1982	Embassy Hall, North Bergen, New Jersey, U.S.	

== Titles in boxing ==
=== Major world titles ===
- IBF light welterweight champion (140 lbs)
- WBC welterweight champion (147 lbs)

=== Minor world titles ===
- IBC light middleweight champion (154 lbs)

=== Regional/International titles ===
- WBC Continental Americas light welterweight champion (140 lbs) (2x)

== See also ==
- List of light-welterweight boxing champions
- List of welterweight boxing champions
- List of WBC world champions
- Notable boxing families

Sporting positions
Regional boxing titles
Vacant Title last held by Gary Hinton	WBC Continental Americas light welterweight champion December 21, 1985 – May 1986; Vacated	Vacant Title next held by John Montes
Vacant Title last held by John Montes	WBC Continental Americas light welterweight champion April 24, 1987 – September 1987; Vacated	Vacant Title next held by Mauricio Rodriguez
Minor world boxing titles
Vacant Title last held by Darrin Morris	IBC light middleweight champion October 25, 1996 – December 1996; Vacated	Vacant Title next held by Robert Frazier
Major world boxing titles
Vacant Title last held by Terry Marsh	IBF light welterweight champion February 14, 1988 – September 3, 1988	Succeeded by Meldrick Taylor
Preceded by Simon Brown	WBC welterweight champion November 29, 1991 – March 6, 1993	Succeeded by Pernell Whitaker
Awards
Previous: English Fisher	BWAA Trainer of the Year; 2002	Next: Freddie Roach
