= Kermin Guardia =

Colombian boxer (born 1970)

Personal information
- Nationality: Colombian
- Born: Kermin William Guardia Villeros; January 17, 1970 (age 56) Turbo, Colombia
- Height: 5 ft 5 in (165 cm)
- Weight: Mini flyweight; Light flyweight

Boxing career
- Reach: 69 in (175 cm)
- Stance: Southpaw

Boxing record
- Total fights: 50
- Wins: 37
- Win by KO: 20
- Losses: 12
- No contests: 1

Kermin William Guardia Villeros (born January 17, 1970), is a Colombian former professional boxer who competed from 1991 to 2010. He won the WBO minimumweight title in 1998.

== Professional career ==
Guardia turned professional in 1991 & amassed a record of 21–0 before unsuccessfully challenging WBC minimumweight champion Ricardo Lopez for the world title. He would go on to win the WBO minimumweight title in 1998, which he held until 2001. In one of his final fights, Guardia would lose to future world champion Rico Ramos via a points decision.

== Professional boxing record ==
50 fights	37 wins	12 losses
By knockout	20	4
By decision	17	8
No contests	1	

No.	Result	Record	Opponent	Type	Round, time	Date	Location	Notes
50	Loss	37–12 (1)	Mike Oliver	KO	3 (6)	2010-03-12	Foxwoods Resort Casino, Mashantucket, Connecticut, U.S.	
49	Loss	37–11 (1)	Michael Franco	TKO	8 (8)	2009-11-28	Spotlight 29 Casino, Coachella, California, U.S.	
48	Loss	37–10 (1)	Rico Ramos	UD	6 (6)	2009-09-26	Staples Center, Los Angeles, California, U.S.	
47	Loss	37–9 (1)	Rafael Concepción	UD	8 (8)	2009-02-03	The Masonic Temple, Brooklyn, New York, U.S.	
46	Loss	37–8 (1)	Hugo Cázares	UD	10 (10)	2008-01-25	Cicero Stadium, Cicero, Illinois, U.S.	
45	Loss	37–7 (1)	Juan Esquer	MD	12 (12)	2007-10-19	Miccosukee Resort & Gaming, Miami, Florida, U.S.	Lost WBC & WBO Latino Light-flyweight titles
44	Win	37–6 (1)	Gerardo Verde Moreno	SD	12 (12)	2007-05-11	Hella Temple, Garland, Texas, U.S.	Won WBC & WBO Latino Light-flyweight titles
43	Win	36–6 (1)	Paulino Villalobos	UD	8 (8)	2006-11-28	Harborside Event Center, Fort Myers, Florida, U.S.	
42	Loss	35–6 (1)	José López	UD	10 (10)	2006-08-19	Auditorio Juan Pachín Vicéns, Ponce, Puerto Rico	For WBA Fedecentro flyweight title
41	Loss	35–5 (1)	Édgar Velásquez	MD	10 (10)	2006-05-05	Atlapa Convention Centre, Panama City, Panama	
40	Loss	35–4 (1)	José Antonio Aguirre	SD	10 (10)	2004-11-26	Plaza Hotel & Casino, Las Vegas, Nevada, U.S.	
39	Loss	35–3 (1)	Nelson Dieppa	KO	1 (12)	2004-03-20	Mario Morales Coliseum, Guaynabo, Puerto Rico	For WBO Light-flyweight title
38	Win	35–2 (1)	Jhon Alberto Molina	UD	12 (12)	2003-07-11	Coliseo Municipal, Puerto Colombia, Colombia	Won interim WBO Light-flyweight title
37	Win	34–2 (1)	Michael Arango	UD	10 (10)	2003-03-14	Centro de Convenciones, Cartagena, Colombia	
36	Win	33–2 (1)	Juan Alfonso Keb Baas	UD	12 (12)	2001-04-06	Polyforum Zam Ná, Merida, Yucatán, Mexico	Retained WBO Mini-flyweight title
35	Win	32–2 (1)	Luis Alberto Lazarte	SD	12 (12)	1999-10-30	Estadio Polideportivo, Mar del Plata, Argentina	Retained WBO Mini-flyweight title
34	Win	31–2 (1)	Eric Jamili	UD	12 (12)	1999-03-27	Jai Alai Fronton, Miami, Florida, U.S.	Retained WBO Mini-flyweight title
33	Win	30–2 (1)	Eric Jamili	RTD	5 (12)	1998-05-30	Hilton Hotel, Winchester, Nevada, U.S.	Won WBO Mini-flyweight title
32	Win	29–2 (1)	Oscar Garces	TKO	2 (?)	1997-07-19	Cartagena, Colombia	
31	Win	28–2 (1)	Manuel Suarez	PTS	6 (6)	1997-02-14	Cartagena, Colombia	
30	Loss	27–2 (1)	Rosendo Álvarez	KO	3 (12)	1996-03-30	Estadio Nacional, Managua, Nicaragua	For WBA Mini-flyweight title
29	NC	27–1 (1)	Julio Coronel	NC	10 (?)	1995-12-19	Parqueadero Estadio Romelio Martinez, Barranquilla, Colombia	For Colombian Mini-flyweight title
28	Win	27–1	Bernabe Franco	KO	1 (?)	1995-08-19	Cienaga, Colombia	
27	Win	26–1	Julio Coronel	TD	6 (10)	1995-04-06	Hotel Royal, Barranquilla, Colombia	
26	Win	25–1	Luis Saenz	KO	5 (?)	1995-02-17	Santa Marta, Colombia	
25	Win	24–1	Julio Moreno	KO	1 (?)	1994-12-16	Cartagena, Colombia	
24	Win	23–1	Ilson Diaz	PTS	10 (10)	1994-10-21	Barranquilla, Colombia	
23	Win	22–1	Nabor Vasquez	TKO	4 (?)	1994-08-19	Cartagena, Colombia	
22	Loss	21–1	Ricardo López	UD	12 (12)	1994-05-07	MGM Grand Garden Arena, Paradise, Nevada, U.S.	For WBC Mini-flyweight title
21	Win	21–0	Luis Saenz	TKO	9 (?)	1994-02-03	Hotel Royal, Barranquilla, Colombia	
20	Win	20–0	Nabor Vasquez	TKO	5 (?)	1993-10-30	Fundacion, Colombia	
19	Win	19–0	Ceferino Sanchez	PTS	10 (10)	1993-09-17	Hotel Royal, Barranquilla, Colombia	
18	Win	18–0	Fidel Julio	TKO	7 (?)	1993-07-23	Hotel Royal, Barranquilla, Colombia	
17	Win	17–0	Marcelino Bolivar	PTS	10 (10)	1993-04-02	Plaza de Toros de Cartagena de Indias, Cartagena, Colombia	
16	Win	16–0	Uriel Londono	TKO	5 (10)	1992-12-17	Hotel Royal, Barranquilla, Colombia	Retained Colombian Mini-flyweight title
15	Win	15–0	Ceferino Sanchez	PTS	10 (10)	1992-11-07	Hotel Royal, Barranquilla, Colombia	
14	Win	14–0	Daniel Montiel	KO	2 (?)	1992-10-23	Cartagena, Colombia	
13	Win	13–0	Carlos Leon	KO	1 (?)	1992-09-11	Barranquilla, Colombia	
12	Win	12–0	Oswaldo Osorio	TKO	3 (10)	1992-07-17	Barranquilla, Colombia	Won Colombian Mini-flyweight title
11	Win	11–0	Felix Zapata	KO	5 (?)	1992-04-15	Cartagena, Colombia	
10	Win	10–0	Elvis Ibarra	KO	6 (?)	1992-03-28	Barranquilla, Colombia	
9	Win	9–0	Henry Casarrubia	TKO	3 (?)	1992-01-24	Cartagena, Colombia	
8	Win	8–0	Gabriel Pava	KO	4 (?)	1991-12-02	Barranquilla, Colombia	
7	Win	7–0	Adalberto Arrieta	PTS	10 (10)	1991-11-15	Plaza de Toros Monumental del Caribe, Barranquilla, Colombia	
6	Win	6–0	Daniel Montiel	PTS	8 (8)	1991-10-18	Cartagena, Colombia	
5	Win	5–0	Roberto Silgado	TKO	1 (?)	1991-08-30	Cartagena, Colombia	
4	Win	4–0	Andres Sanchez	PTS	4 (4)	1991-07-26	Barranquilla, Colombia	
3	Win	3–0	Gabriel Pava	PTS	4 (4)	1991-07-19	Cartagena, Colombia	
2	Win	2–0	Santander Valceiro	KO	1 (?)	1991-06-14	Cartagena, Colombia	
1	Win	1–0	Nelson Gonzalez	KO	1 (?)	1991-05-11	Cartagena, Colombia	

== See also ==
- List of southpaw stance boxers
- List of world mini-flyweight boxing champions

Sporting positions
World boxing titles
Preceded by Eric Jamili	WBO mini-flyweight champion May 30, 1998 – 2001; Vacated	Succeeded by Jorge Mata interim champion promoted
New title	WBO light flyweight champion Interim title July 11, 2003 – March 20, 2004; Lost bid for full title	Vacant Title next held by John Riel Casimero
