= Mills Lane =

American boxing referee (1937–2022)

Personal information
- Born: Mills Bee Lane III; November 12, 1937 Savannah, Georgia, U.S.
- Died: December 6, 2022 (aged 85) Reno, Nevada, U.S.
- Weight: Welterweight

Boxing career
- Stance: Southpaw

Boxing record
- Total fights: 11
- Wins: 10
- Win by KO: 6
- Losses: 1

Mills Bee Lane III (November 12, 1937 – December 6, 2022) was an American boxing referee and professional boxer, a two-term Washoe County, Nevada district court judge, and television personality.

Lane was best known for having officiated several major heavyweight championship boxing matches in the 1970s, 1980s, and 1990s, and for starring in the syndicated court show Judge Mills Lane. On June 9, 2013, Lane was inducted into the International Boxing Hall of Fame, and was inducted into the Nevada Boxing Hall of Fame on August 10 the same year.

== Early life ==
Lane was born in Savannah, Georgia, on November 12, 1937. He hailed from a prominent Georgia family: his grandfather founded the largest bank in Georgia, Citizens & Southern National Bank. His uncle (and namesake) was the president of C&S.

Lane attended Middlesex School in Concord, Massachusetts, where he played American football as a linebacker and ice hockey as a goaltender. Lane joined the United States Marine Corps in 1956, and was discharged in 1959. Subsequently, he enrolled at the University of Nevada, Reno. He graduated with a business degree in 1963.

== Boxing career ==
=== Boxer ===
Lane became a boxer while serving as a Marine, becoming the All-Far East welterweight champ. He was a National Collegiate Athletic Association welterweight boxing champion in 1960. In the U.S. Olympic Trials in San Francisco for the 1960 Summer Olympics, Lane was defeated by Phil Baldwin in the semifinals. He turned pro while in college, eventually earning a 10–1 (.909) record as a professional.

=== Referee ===
Lane refereed his first world championship boxing match in 1971, when Betulio González had a fifteen-round draw with Erbito Salavarria for the WBC flyweight title.

Lane refereed the second fight between WBA Heavyweight Champion Evander Holyfield and challenger Mike Tyson on June 28, 1997. Mitch Halpern was supposed to referee the fight, but Tyson's camp protested, so Lane was brought in at the last minute. After Tyson bit Holyfield's ears twice, Lane disqualified him. Lane's shirt was stained with blood from the incident, and he sold it to a memorabilia collector on the same night.

Less than three weeks later, Lane refereed the Lennox Lewis vs. Henry Akinwande match. As in Tyson vs. Holyfield, it ended in disqualification when Akinwande used illegal tactics, these being excessive clinching and ignoring Lane's repeated orders to stop. After refereeing the fight between Thomas Hearns and Jay Snyder on November 6, 1998, Lane retired as a boxing referee.

Lane was elected to the International Boxing Hall of Fame in 2013. On August 10 that same year, he was also inducted into the Nevada Boxing Hall of Fame.

== Legal career ==
Lane attended the University of Utah's S.J. Quinney College of Law, graduating with the class of 1970 and joined the bar in Nevada. In 1979, Lane became Chief Deputy Sheriff of Investigative Services at the Washoe County Sheriff's Office. Lane also served as one of fourteen witnesses to Nevada's last gas chamber execution, that of Jesse Bishop that same year. He was elected District Attorney in 1982 and District Judge in 1990.

== Television career ==
Lane presided over the court show Judge Mills Lane, which lasted for three seasons, from 1998 to 2001. In addition to this show, the producers of MTV's Celebrity Deathmatch approached him about having his character and voice used in their show as the referee of their plasticine figure matches. Lane accepted the offer and became an MTV personality. As a referee, Lane started boxing matches by declaring "Let's get it on!", which became his catchphrase. This was reproduced in Celebrity Deathmatch as his character would shout the same phrase to initiate fights.

Lane made two appearances in the world of professional wrestling. He appeared on the November 16, 1998, episode of WWE Raw on the Titantron and made a ruling in regards to a contract dispute between Stone Cold Steve Austin and the McMahon family. He was also the special guest referee for a boxing match between "Rowdy" Roddy Piper and Buff Bagwell at WCW Bash at the Beach on July 11, 1999.

Lane was a guest voice actor on an episode of Buzz Lightyear of Star Command.

=== Judge Mills Lane ===
Mills Lane
- Genre: Arbitration-based reality court show
- Presented by: Kim Adams
- Starring: Mills Lane (judge); Pamela Hart (bailiff)
- Narrated by: Jim Cutler
- Theme music composer: Edd Kalehoff
- Country of origin: United States
- Original language: English
- No. of seasons: 3
- No. of episodes: 700

Production
- Executive producers: John Tomlin; Bob Young
- Production locations: WPIX, New York, New York (seasons 1–2); CBS Broadcast Center, New York City, New York (season 3)
- Running time: 30 minutes
- Production companies: Tomlin-Young Productions; Hurricane Entertainment Corp. Rysher Entertainment (1998–2000) (seasons 1–2); Paramount Domestic Television (1999–2001) (seasons 2–3)

Original release
- Network: Syndicated
- Release: August 17, 1998 – May 18, 2001

Judge Mills Lane is an American syndicated arbitration-based reality court show that ran in first-run syndication from August 17, 1998 to September 7, 2001. Reruns later aired on The National Network (TNN) and currently on Pluto TV. The show was produced by John Tomlin and Bob Young for Hurricane Entertainment Group. Judge Mills Lane was distributed by Rysher Entertainment (until 2000) for its first two seasons and Paramount Domestic Television for its last two.

==== Synopsis ====
The show was presided over by Mills Lane. Lane stepped down from his position as a judge in Reno to host the show. The introduction to the series' first two seasons mentioned Lane's connection to both boxing and the law. Lane's catchphrase "let's get it on" was used to open each case and if he found one of the litigants to be out of line, he would tell them that if they didn't stop, "your case is gone."

Judge Mills Lane premiered at a time when court shows were starting to see a large revival. The show could not find secure enough footing in an increasingly crowded market and was cancelled after three seasons. Judge Mills Lane produced 700 episodes before its cancellation.

== Personal life and death ==
Lane and his wife, Kaye, had two sons.

Lane titled his autobiography Let's Get It On: Tough Talk from Boxing's Top Ref and Nevada's Most Outspoken Judge.

Lane suffered a debilitating stroke in March 2002, which left him partially paralyzed and virtually unable to speak. With his blessing, this led to his Celebrity Deathmatch alter-ego being voiced by Chris Edgerly (already the voice of color commentator Nick Diamond) for the MTV2 revival.

Lane's adopted city of Reno proclaimed December 27, 2004, as "Mills Lane Day'". In May 2006, Lane made his first public appearance in years at the dedication of a new courthouse in Reno which is named after him. The Mills B. Lane Justice Center houses the Reno Municipal Court and the Washoe County District Attorney's Office.

Lane died from kidney failure at his home in Reno, Nevada on December 6, 2022, at the age of 85. His son Terry said the cause was complications from Lane's 2002 stroke.

== Professional boxing record ==
| 11 fights | 10 wins | 1 loss |
|---|---|---|
| By knockout | 6 | 1 |
| By decision | 4 | 0 |

| No. | Result | Record | Opponent | Type | Round, time | Date | Location | Notes |
|---|---|---|---|---|---|---|---|---|
| 11 | Win | 10–1 | (United States) Buddy Knox | UD | 6 | May 9, 1967 | (United States) Centennial Coliseum, Reno, Nevada | |
| 10 | Win | 9–1 | (Mexico) David Camacho | UD | 10 | February 28, 1963 | (United States) Mathisen Hall, Reno, Nevada | |
| 9 | Win | 8–1 | (United States) Al Walker | UD | 6 | January 31, 1963 | (United States) Mathisen Hall, Reno, Nevada | |
| 8 | Win | 7–1 | (United States) Larry Sanchez | KO | 2 (6), 1:04 | December 12, 1962 | (United States) Mathisen Hall, Reno, Nevada | |
| 7 | Win | 6–1 | (United States) Artie Cox | KO | 3 (8), 0:43 | August 7, 1962 | (United States) Memorial Auditorium, Sacramento, California | |
| 6 | Win | 5–1 | (United States) Al Carroll | TKO | 5 (8), 3:00 | July 17, 1962 | (United States) State Building, Reno, Nevada | |
| 5 | Win | 4–1 | (United States) Dick Smith | PTS | 6 | June 26, 1962 | (United States) Sacramento, California | |
| 4 | Win | 3–1 | (United States) Marva Hawkins | KO | 6 (6) | June 12, 1962 | (United States) Sacramento, California | |
| 3 | Win | 2–1 | (United States) Sonny King | TKO | 1 (6), 2:10 | May 27, 1962 | (United States) Wagon Wheel Convention Center, Stateline, Nevada | |
| 2 | Win | 1–1 | (United States) Carlos Loya | TKO | 1 (4) | May 10, 1962 | (United States) State Building, Reno, Nevada | |
| 1 | Loss | 0–1 | (United States) Artie Cox | TKO | 1 (4), 0:35 | April 7, 1961 | (United States) State Building, Reno, Nevada | |
