= Darrin Morris =

American boxer

Darrin Morris (June 15, 1966 – October 1, 2000) was an American super middleweight boxer, nicknamed "The Mongoose".

Morris was born in Detroit and died in West Palm Beach. He once was a sparring partner for Sugar Ray Leonard, and he achieved a professional record of 28-2-1 with 18 KOs.

The World Boxing Organization (WBO) twice moved Morris up in its super-middleweight rankings in 2001, despite the fact that he had died of HIV-related meningitis the previous October, aged 34. Morris was ranked #7 at the time of his death and #5 when the WBO discovered the error. WBO president Francisco Varcarcel said, "We obviously missed the fact that Darrin was dead. It is regrettable." One week after British newspaper The Independent broke the story, one of the three men ranking the boxers, Gordon Volkman, still had not heard that Morris was dead. In addition, Morris had only fought once in the three years before his death, beating a boxer with only 17 wins out of 81 fights.
