= Villa Roma =

Resort in the Catskill mountains

Coordinates: 41°45′45.8″N 74°58′29.5″W

The Villa Roma Resort and Conference Center is located in Callicoon, NY, part of the Catskill Mountains. Its history dates back to 1944, and it is one of the few remaining resorts in the area. The Resort is located near the Bethel Woods Center for the Arts and Monticello Raceway. The resort offers family activities, nightlife, swimming pools and jacuzzis, go-karts, live entertainment, multiple sports facilities, formal and casual dining as well as a Championship Golf Course.

== History ==
The resort was established in 1944 by Ernesto Vindigni. At the time it had fewer than fifty hotel rooms and ten cottages. Owing to its Italian ownership, the resort's pool was accompanied by two bocce courts. Its first major expansion came in the 1970s, after Martin Passante was bow-hunting nearby and spotted the for-sale sign on the property. They purchased the property in December, 1969 and by 1973 began construction on the Club Forum and Futura Wing, which allowed the hotel to remain open year-round once it opened in 1978. An Indoor sports complex followed in 1982 and a ski area in 1983. As of 2017, Villa Roma hosts more than 200,000 guests per year in 24 timeshare buildings, and 139 hotel rooms. in Sep 2024, Fay Hospitality Catskills bought the resort for $15 million with plans for major renovations.

== Culture ==
The Villa Roma resort was designed as an Italian Resort and features a Tuscan atmosphere. Much of the cuisine in the main dining room is focused around fine Italian dining. Though located right within the once-popular borscht belt, many of those who vacation at the resort are of Italian descent and the resort is not kosher. A large number of those guests are from the New York City area. This differs from the traditional resorts in the area, which were opened and operated by Jewish families to serve predominantly other Jewish families. Villa Roma, today, is a popular vacation spot of many families of Jewish descent. Around the time of the Jewish holiday, Passover, the resort changes its menu and serves guests meals designated for the holiday to those who gather for it. The resort is said to mix tradition with modern amenities.

== Golf course ==
The Villa Roma golf course is one of the newest in the Catskills. Opened in 1986, the 18-hole Course is designed as a Par 71, 6.499 yard course for experts and 6,200 - 6,350 yards for beginners, young golfers and women.

== 2006 fire ==
In April 2006, the Villa Roma resort suffered a fire in its main building. While the Timeshares and the Golf Course were not affected, most of the remaining resort had to be shut down temporarily until the owners could assess what was usable.
