= Meldrick Taylor =

American former professional boxer who competed from 1984 to 2002

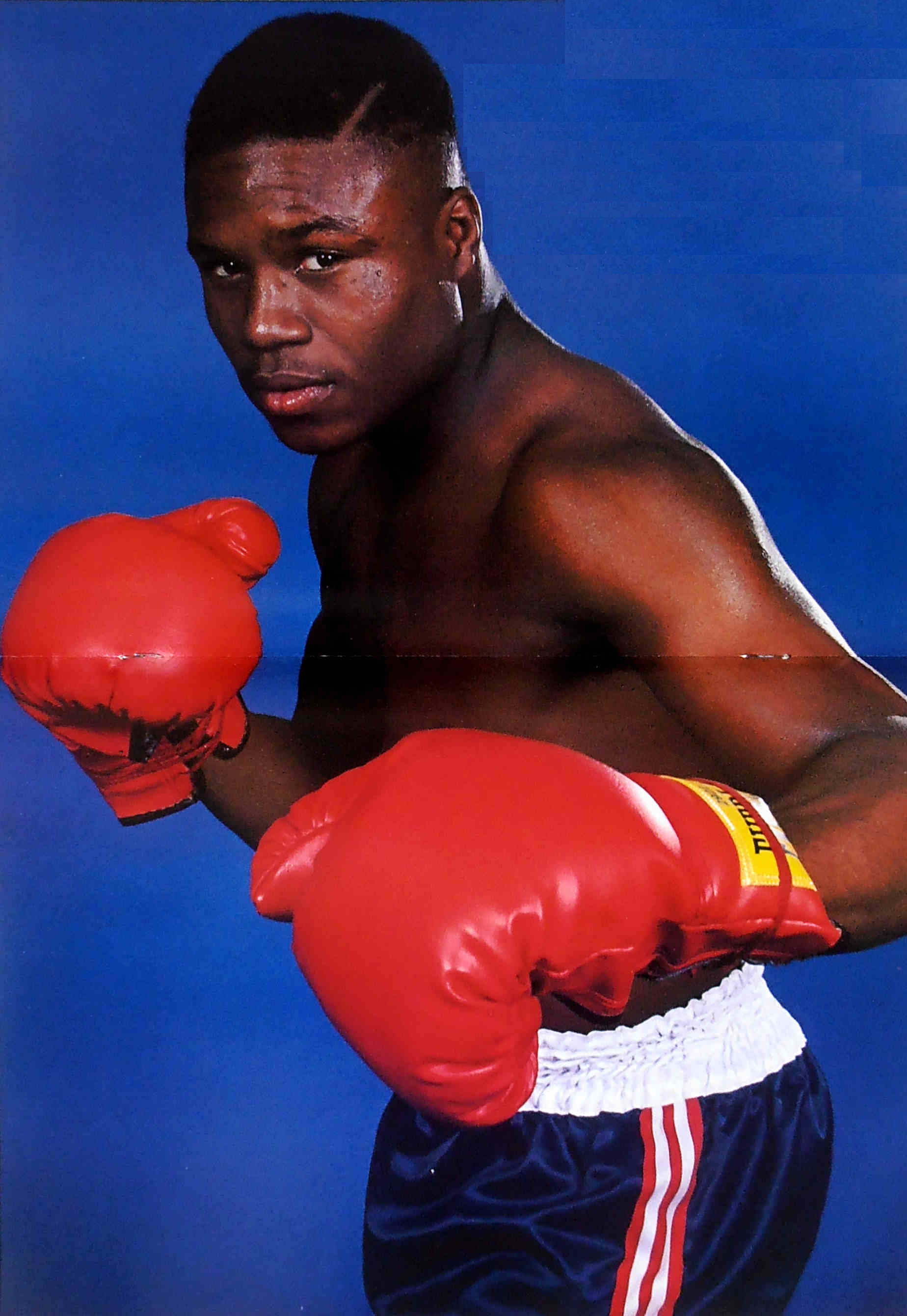
- Taylor c. 1988

Personal information
- Nicknames: The Kid; TNT
- Born: October 19, 1966 (age 60) Philadelphia, Pennsylvania, U.S.
- Height: 5 ft 6 1/2 in (169 cm)
- Weight: Light welterweight; Welterweight; Light middleweight

Boxing career
- Reach: 66 in (168 cm)
- Stance: Orthodox

Boxing record
- Total fights: 47
- Wins: 38
- Win by KO: 20
- Losses: 8
- Draws: 1
Medal record
Men's amateur boxing
Representing United States
Olympic Games
Gold medal – first place	1984 Los Angeles	Featherweight

Meldrick Taylor (born October 19, 1966) is an American former professional boxer who competed from 1984 to 2002. He held world championships in two weight classes, including the IBF junior welterweight title from 1988 to 1990, and the WBA welterweight title from 1991 to 1992. As an amateur, Taylor won a gold medal in the featherweight division at the 1984 Summer Olympics.

== Amateur career ==
Taylor, one of many boxing champions hailing from the city of Philadelphia, Pennsylvania, learned his craft in the gyms of his hometown and posted a 99–4 record as an amateur fighter. In 1984, Taylor earned a spot on the 1984 U.S. Olympic team at the age of 17, and claimed the gold medal in the featherweight division. Following his victory, he joined the professional ranks.

=== 1984 Olympic results ===
- Round of 64:
- Round of 32: Defeated Nicolae Talpos (Romania) 5-0
- Round of 16: Defeated Francisco Camacho (Mexico) 5-0
- Quarterfinal: Defeated John Wanjau (Kenya) referee stopped contest in the third round
- Semifinal: Defeated Omar Catari (Venezuela) 5-0
- Final: Defeated Peter Konyegwachie (Nigeria) 5-0 (won gold medal)

In the American Olympic trials Taylor lost to Andrew Minsker, who then went on to win the trials. However, Taylor beat Minsker twice back to back to earn the spot in the Olympic box-offs.

== Professional career ==
His early fights were against nondescript journeymen, but in his 12th fight, in May 1986, Taylor won a unanimous decision against fellow contender Harold Brazier and moved into the world rankings. On September 3, 1988, Taylor faced James (Buddy) McGirt for the IBF light welterweight title. He defeated McGirt by a technical knockout (TKO) in the 12th and final round to begin his first title reign.

=== Taylor vs. Chávez ===
Over the next 18 months, Taylor won four more fights, setting up a unification bout with the WBC light welterweight champion Julio César Chávez on March 17, 1990 in Las Vegas. Chavez had an aura of invincibility, he was considered the best fighter pound for pound in the world and also one of the most dangerous fighters in the sport. This fight drew huge media attention, as both men came in unbeaten (Taylor at 24-0-1 and Chávez at 66-0), and regarded as two of the best boxers in the world, regardless of weight class. Their fight was one of the most famous and controversial bouts in boxing history.

Taylor took control of the action early and began to build up a lead on the scorecards. However, Chávez proved to be a heavier puncher, and was slowly wearing Taylor down even as he lost rounds. Going to the 12th and final round, Taylor led by wide margins on two of the three scorecards, and his corner famously told him that he needed to win that round. Because of this, Taylor chose to continue fighting at close quarters with the hard-hitting Mexican champion. Chávez, realizing time was running out, came at Taylor aggressively in the last round. With 17 seconds left in the fight, Chávez floored Taylor. Taylor beat the 10-count and got back to his feet at six. Referee Richard Steele twice asked Taylor, "Are you ok?" Taylor did not respond and only looked at his corner. Steele waved the fight off with just two seconds left, awarding Chávez a win by TKO.

The controversy surrounding the stoppage continues to this day, and 10 years later, The Ring proclaimed it the "Fight of the Decade".

Many boxing fans believe that Taylor was essentially 'ruined' as a fighter because of this bout—due in part to the tremendous punishment taken at the hands of Chavez, including several fractures and some kidney damage (according to the HBO "Legendary Nights" episode mentioned before, he was taken to the hospital immediately after the Chavez bout—reportedly urinating blood.)

=== WBA welterweight champion and rematch with Chávez ===
Taylor had lost his title, but not his desire. Feeling that having to make the 140 pound (64 kg) weight had weakened him against Chavez, Taylor moved up to welterweight (147 pounds) and decisioned undefeated Aaron Davis for the WBA welterweight title on January 19, 1991. He issued a challenge to Chávez for a rematch at 147 pounds, but the latter wouldn't move up in weight for many years. Taylor won three more fights before issuing a challenge to world junior middleweight champion Terry Norris to fight for Norris' WBC title. Norris, a naturally bigger and stronger man, knocked Taylor out in the fourth round.

This marked the end of Taylor's career as a world-class fighter; he lost the welterweight crown to undefeated challenger Crisanto España in his next fight on Halloween night in 1992. Taylor won his following three fights, including a second-round knockout over number four ranked welterweight Chad Broussard. He got one more title shot, against Chávez on September 17, 1994 in Las Vegas, but, years removed from his prime, he was stopped by Chávez in the eighth round. The fight was competitive, with Taylor getting off to a fast start. But after a brutal sixth round, Taylor's legs became rubbery and he was stopped 2 rounds later. Taylor was suspended by The State Athletic Commission in 1997 for failing to appear at a bout in Altoona, PA. It was scheduled for April 6, 1997 against 18-0 Ken Sigurani In a 10-round welterweight event.

He fought off and on over the next couple of years, winning some fights and losing others, before retiring in 2002. He finished with a record of 38-8-1, (20 KOs).

During an episode of HBO's "Legendary Nights" in 2003, an interview with Taylor was shown, in which his speech was very slurred and difficult to understand. Many viewers were shocked and disturbed when they heard the way Taylor now speaks. Indeed, the episode implicitly attributed this to pugilistic dementia—mentioning, time and again, how Taylor was well past his prime as a fighter.

Meldrick Taylor has written his autobiography, titled Two Seconds From Glory.

== 2019 arrest ==
Meldrick Taylor was arrested on Tuesday, June 4, 2019 in North Philadelphia morning after he allegedly threatened a man with a gun and engaged in a 90-minute standoff with police at his residence. Taylor was charged with aggravated assault, possession of an instrument of crime and terroristic threats. He was later released on an unsecured bond.

== Personal ==
Meldrick Taylor has a twin brother, Eldrick, who was also briefly a professional boxer. Eldrick Taylor compiled a record of 0 wins and 1 loss. Another brother, Myron, competed as a professional boxer as well. Myron Taylor had a record of 29 wins (16 by knockout), 9 losses and one draw (tie), and who once challenged for a world title.

== Professional boxing record ==
47 fights	38 wins	8 losses
By knockout	20	4
By decision	18	4
Draws	1	

No.	Result	Record	Opponent	Type	Round, time	Date	Location	Notes
47	Loss	38–8–1	Wayne Martell	UD	10	Jul 20, 2002	Shooting Star Casino, Mahnomen, Minnesota, U.S.	
46	Win	38–7–1	Dillon Carew	SD	8	May 31, 2002	Boutwell Memorial Auditorium, Birmingham, Alabama, U.S.	
45	Win	37–7–1	Manuel De Leon	UD	8	Sep 10, 1999	Southeastern Livestock Pavilion, Ocala, Florida, U.S.	
44	Win	36–7–1	Tim Scott	TKO	3	Aug 26, 1999	Roxy Theatre, Atlanta, Georgia, U.S.	
43	Loss	35–7–1	Quirino Garcia	UD	12	Feb 26, 1999	Gimnasio Municipal Josue Neri Santos, Ciudad Juárez, Mexico	
42	Loss	35–6–1	Hasan Al	UD	10	Aug 28, 1998	Atletion, Aarhus, Denmark	
41	Win	35–5–1	Rafael Salas	UD	6	Aug 6, 1998	Aurora, Illinois, U.S.	
40	Loss	34–5–1	Darren Maciunski	SD	10	Nov 26, 1996	The Blue Horizon, Philadelphia, Pennsylvania, U.S.	
39	Win	34–4–1	Tommy Small	UD	10	Oct 10, 1996	Hilton, Washington D.C., U.S.	
38	Win	33–4–1	Kenneth Kidd	TKO	1 (10), 2:59	Aug 16, 1996	Jaffa Shrine Center, Altoona, Pennsylvania, U.S.	
37	Loss	32–4–1	Julio César Chávez	TKO	8 (12), 1:41	Sep 17, 1994	MGM Grand Garden Arena, Paradise, Nevada, U.S.	For WBC light welterweight title
36	Win	32–3–1	Chad Broussard	KO	2 (10), 1:01	May 7, 1994	MGM Grand Garden Arena, Paradise, Nevada, U.S.	
35	Win	31–3–1	Craig Houk	KO	3 (10), 1:02	Jan 29, 1994	MGM Grand Garden Arena, Paradise, Nevada, U.S.	
34	Win	30–3–1	Henry Hughes	RTD	2 (10), 3:00	May 8, 1993	Thomas & Mack Center, Paradise, Nevada, U.S.	
33	Loss	29–3–1	Crisanto España	TKO	8 (12), 2:11	Oct 31, 1992	Earls Court Exhibition Centre, London, England	Lost WBA welterweight title
32	Loss	29–2–1	Terry Norris	TKO	4 (12), 2:55	May 9, 1992	The Mirage, Paradise, Nevada, U.S.	For WBC super welterweight title
31	Win	29–1–1	Glenwood Brown	UD	12	Jan 18, 1992	Convention Hall, Philadelphia, Pennsylvania, U.S.	Retained WBA welterweight title
30	Win	28–1–1	Ernie Chavez	TKO	6 (10), 1:51	Sep 13, 1991	ARCO Arena, Sacramento, California, U.S.	
29	Win	27–1–1	Luis Garcia	SD	12	Jun 1, 1991	Radisson Hotel, Palm Springs, California, U.S.	Retained WBA welterweight title
28	Win	26–1–1	Aaron Davis	UD	12	Jan 19, 1991	Convention Hall, Atlantic City, New Jersey, U.S.	Won WBA welterweight title
27	Win	25–1–1	Primo Ramos	UD	10	Aug 11, 1990	Caesars Tahoe, Stateline, Nevada, U.S.	
26	Loss	24–1–1	Julio César Chávez	TKO	12 (12), 2:58	Mar 17, 1990	Las Vegas Hilton, Winchester, Nevada, U.S.	Lost IBF light welterweight title; For WBC light welterweight title
25	Win	24–0–1	Ramon Flores	TKO	1 (10), 1:57	Jan 27, 1990	Trump Plaza Hotel and Casino, Atlantic City, New Jersey, U.S.	
24	Win	23–0–1	Jaime Balboa	TKO	5 (10), 1:59	Nov 20, 1989	Convention Hall, Philadelphia, Pennsylvania, U.S.	
23	Win	22–0–1	Courtney Hooper	UD	12	Sep 11, 1989	Circus Maximus Showroom, Atlantic City, New Jersey, U.S.	Retained IBF light welterweight title
22	Win	21–0–1	John Wesley Meekins	RTD	7 (12), 3:00	Jan 21, 1989	Trump Plaza Hotel and Casino, Atlantic City, New Jersey, U.S.	Retained IBF light welterweight title
21	Win	20–0–1	Buddy McGirt	TKO	12 (12), 2:00	Sep 3, 1988	Broadway by the Bay Theater, Atlantic City, New Jersey, U.S.	Won IBF light welterweight title
20	Win	19–0–1	Martin Quiroz	UD	10	Jun 12, 1988	Odeum Expo Center, Villa Park, Illinois, U.S.	
19	Win	18–0–1	Ivan Gonzalez	TKO	5 (10), 2:47	Apr 9, 1988	Caesars Palace, Paradise, Nevada, U.S.	
18	Win	17–0–1	Richard Fowler	KO	2 (10), 1:19	Nov 4, 1987	Memorial Coliseum, Corpus Christi, Texas, U.S.	
17	Win	16–0–1	Irleis Perez	UD	10	Jul 11, 1987	Broadway by the Bay Theater, Atlantic City, New Jersey, U.S.	
16	Win	15–0–1	Primo Ramos	UD	10	Apr 19, 1987	Pointe Resort, Phoenix, Arizona, U.S.	
15	Win	14–0–1	Roque Montoya	UD	10	Feb 6, 1987	Trump Plaza Hotel and Casino, Atlantic City, New Jersey, U.S.	
14	Win	13–0–1	Danny Vargas	TKO	2 (10), 1:49	Dec 11, 1986	Felt Forum, New York City, New York, U.S.	
13	Draw	12–0–1	Howard Davis Jr.	SD	10	Aug 16, 1986	Sands, Atlantic City, New Jersey, U.S.	
12	Win	12–0	Harold Brazier	UD	10	May 11, 1986	Memorial Coliseum, Corpus Christi, Texas, U.S.	
11	Win	11–0	Jose Rivera	TKO	6 (10), 2:07	Apr 3, 1986	Felt Forum, New York City, New York, U.S.	
10	Win	10–0	Robin Blake	UD	10	Feb 2, 1986	Sudduth Coliseum, Lake Charles, Louisiana, U.S.	
9	Win	9–0	Victor Acosta	UD	8	Dec 21, 1985	Pavilion, Virginia Beach, Virginia, U.S.	
8	Win	8–0	Carlos Santana	KO	4 (8), 2:45	Oct 16, 1985	Broadway by the Bay Theater, Atlantic City, New Jersey, U.S.	
7	Win	7–0	Roberto Medina	UD	6	Jul 20, 1985	Scope, Norfolk, Virginia, U.S.	
6	Win	6–0	Hugo Carrizo	TKO	3	Jun 29, 1985	Bellaria, Italy	
5	Win	5–0	Nery Reyes	KO	1 (6), 2:35	May 17, 1985	Caesars Tahoe, Stateline, Nevada, U.S.	
4	Win	4–0	Elias Martinez	TKO	5 (6)	Apr 6, 1985	San Angelo, Texas, U.S.	
3	Win	3–0	Darrell Curtis	TKO	3 (6), 2:09	Mar 13, 1985	Scope, Norfolk, Virginia, U.S.	
2	Win	2–0	Dwight Pratchett	UD	6	Jan 20, 1985	Broadway by the Bay Theater, Atlantic City, New Jersey, U.S.	
1	Win	1–0	Luke Lecce	TKO	1 (6), 2:31	Nov 15, 1984	Madison Square Garden, New York City, New York, U.S.	

== Titles in boxing ==
=== Major world titles ===
- IBF light welterweight champion (140 lbs)
- WBA welterweight champion (147 lbs)

Sporting positions
World boxing titles
Preceded by Buddy McGirt	IBF junior welterweight champion September 3, 1988 – March 17, 1990	Succeeded by Julio César Chávez
Preceded by Aaron Davis	WBA welterweight champion January 19, 1991 – October 31, 1992	Succeeded by Crisanto España
