= Jerry Roth =

American boxing judge (1941–2022)

Gerald Howard "Jerry" Roth (May 12, 1941 – December 23, 2022) was an American boxing judge.

== Career ==
Roth was born on 12 May 1941 in Scranton, Pennsylvania. He was married with Bunnie Roth and they have three children together.

Roth started his career in 1980 with the Nevada State Athletic Commission. He went one to judge 225 world title fights.

In May 2015, Roth announced retirement as a boxing judge.

In 2018, Roth was inducted in the Nevada Boxing Hall of Fame.

== Accolades ==
- 2017: International Boxing Hall of Fame
- 2018: Nevada Boxing Hall of Fame
