= Frankie Randall =

American boxer (1961–2020)

Personal information
- Nickname: The Surgeon
- Born: Frankie Billy Randall; September 25, 1961 Birmingham, Alabama, U.S.
- Died: December 23, 2020 (aged 59) Morristown, Tennessee, U.S.
- Height: 5 ft 9 in (175 cm)
- Weight: Lightweight; Light welterweight; Welterweight; Light middleweight

Boxing career
- Reach: 68 in (173 cm)
- Stance: Orthodox

Boxing record
- Total fights: 77
- Wins: 58
- Win by KO: 42
- Losses: 18
- Draws: 1

Frankie Billy Randall (September 25, 1961 – December 23, 2020) was an American professional boxer who competed from 1983 to 2005. He was a three-time light welterweight world champion, having held the WBA and WBC world titles between 1994 and 1997. Randall is best known for being the first boxer to defeat Julio César Chávez, whose record at the time of their 1994 fight stood at 89 wins and a draw.

== Professional career ==
Randall was born in Birmingham, Alabama, and grew up in Morristown, Tennessee. He turned pro in 1981 after a career as an amateur boxer. He won his pro debut in June of that year, but was inactive in 1982 and did not fight again until February 1983.

Randall fought and won 23 times between 1983 and June 1985, when he fought former and future champ Edwin Rosario and lost a unanimous decision over 10 rounds.

On July 4, 1986, Randall drew with Freddie Pendleton for the USBA regional lightweight title, then watched Pendleton get a title shot instead of him. In October 1987, Randall was knocked out by Mexican lightweight champion Primo Ramos for the NABF regional belt.

Randall then signed with promoter Don King and spent the next six and a half years fighting on the undercards of various championship fights promoted by King. He won all 17 of those fights, and on January 30, 1993, earned another title shot when he knocked out Rosario in the seventh round of a rematch.

=== Randall vs. Chávez ===
On January 29, 1994, Randall fought for the title against champion Julio César Chávez, in the grand opening of the MGM Grand Garden in Las Vegas. Chávez came into the fight with an 89-0-1 record and was an 18-to-1 favorite. Randall won the early rounds, and in the middle of the fight began to build a large lead on the scorecards. Chávez then rallied, and by the 10th round, Randall held a narrow lead. Chávez made an illegal low blow that cost Chávez a point. In the 11th round, Randall knocked Chávez down for the first time in his career. Randall was named WBC light welterweight champion on a split decision. Chavez disputed the decision and demanded a rematch. Though clearly beaten, Chávez blamed his loss on the referee who deducted two points from Chávez for low blows. This included one in the eleventh round that made the difference on judge Angel Guzman's card, making the ultimate difference on the scorecards. (Guzman scored the bout 114–113 for Randall, meaning that the fight would have ended in a draw as Chuck Giampa had Randall winning by a 116–111 margin and Abraham Chavarria scored it 114–113 for Chavez.)

=== Rematch against Chávez ===
Chávez got a rematch on May 7 of the same year and regained the title from Randall on an eight-round technical split decision. As before, a deducted point played a part in the outcome of the fight. Chavez was injured in an accidental clash of heads and unable to continue. According to the WBC rules, Randall was docked a point for the incident, although it wasn't a foul. Judge Dalby Shirley's scorecard read 76–75 for Chavez; with judge Ray Solis having Chavez winning by a 77–74 margin on his card and judge Tamotsu Tomihara had the fight 76–75 in Randall's favor.

On September 17, Randall was given a shot at the WBA version of the light welterweight title held by Juan Martin Coggi. He beat Coggi, defended his title twice, then lost a rematch to Coggi in January 1996 in a four-round decision in a fight ended early by a clash of heads.

Seven months later, Randall regained the WBA title, beating Coggi by unanimous decision in Buenos Aires, Argentina. He lost it in his first defense, against Khalid Rahilou on January 11, 1997.

After taking 18 months off, Randall came back in an attempt to become a four-time world champ. He won a pair of tune-up fights, then faced contender Oba Carr in February 1999 where Carr beat him on a 10-round unanimous decision.

=== Third fight against Chávez ===
On May 22, 2004, Chávez chose Randall for his last fight before going into retirement. Randall lost a 10-round decision to Chávez in Mexico City.

=== PED allegations ===
Frankie Randall tested positive for drugs after his fight against Argentine boxer Juan Martin Coggi. The Argentine Boxing Federation claimed that Randall tested positive for multiple drugs, some of the drugs included cocaine and theophylline.

=== Retirement ===
Randall announced his retirement on January 1, 2005, after losing a fight to light-middleweight Marco Antonio Rubio. He lost a bout the following month to Mauro Lucero, and another bout later in the year. Randall's final career record is 58 wins, 18 losses and one draw, with 42 wins by way of knockout.

=== Death and legacy ===
Randall died on December 23, 2020, in his hometown of Morristown, Tennessee. The cause of death was reportedly of dementia pugilistica Randall had been diagnosed with pugilistic dementia (also referred to as boxing dementia) and Parkinson's disease, involving a frontal lobe brain injury that affected his speech, motor skills, and mental stability. According to his family and reports from Boxing 24/7, he resided in a care/nursing home in Tennessee as his health declined. After he was diagnosed with boxing dementia he checked into a mental health facility in Chattanooga, Tennessee. Even while in a senior care home, Randall kept his bag packed with boxing equipment, believing his trainer was coming for him.

In October 2026, the city of Morristown renamed a street near the Talley Ward Recreation Center, where Randall used to train, "Frankie Randall Way" in his honor.

== Professional boxing record ==
77 fights	58 wins	18 losses
By knockout	42	12
By decision	14	6
By disqualification	2	0
Draws	1	

No.	Result	Record	Opponent	Type	Round, time	Date	Location	Notes
77	Loss	58–18–1	Craig Weber	TKO	6 (10), 2:43	Jul 15, 2005	Gund Arena, Cleveland, Ohio, U.S.	
76	Loss	58–17–1	Mauro Lucero	TKO	5 (10), 0:10	Feb 25, 2005	Poliforo Juan Gabriel, Ciudad Juárez, Mexico	For WBC Continental Americas light middleweight title
75	Loss	58–16–1	Marco Antonio Rubio	KO	2 (10), 0:59	Jan 1, 2005	Auditorio Municipal, Torreón, Mexico	
74	Loss	58–15–1	Julio César Chávez	UD	10	May 22, 2004	Plaza de Toros, Mexico City, Mexico	
73	Loss	58–14–1	Fernando Hernandez	TKO	3 (10), 2:56	Nov 26, 2003	Ramada O'Hare, Rosemont, Illinois, U.S.	For vacant WBA–NABA light middleweight title
72	Win	58–13–1	Patrick Thorns	SD	6	Jun 12, 2003	Ramada O'Hare, Rosemont, Illinois, U.S.	
71	Loss	57–13–1	Peter Manfredo Jr.	TKO	7 (12)	Oct 4, 2002	Dunkin' Donuts Center, Providence, Rhode Island, U.S.	For vacant IBU light middleweight title
70	Win	57–12–1	Fernando Hernandez	DQ	5 (8)	Aug 16, 2002	Ramada O'Hare, Rosemont, Illinois, U.S.	Hernandez disqualified for low blows
69	Win	56–12–1	Alberto Mercedes	UD	6	Jun 7, 2002	Ramada O'Hare, Rosemont, Illinois, U.S.	
68	Loss	55–12–1	Chantel Stanciel	RTD	8 (10), 3:00	Oct 19, 2001	Hilton, Washington, D.C., U.S.	
67	Loss	55–11–1	José Antonio Rivera	KO	10 (12), 1:28	Aug 24, 2001	Sands, Atlantic City, New Jersey, U.S.	For WBA–NABA welterweight title
66	Loss	55–10–1	Ángel Hernández	TKO	4 (10), 2:26	Jun 14, 2001	Ramada O'Hare, Rosemont, Illinois, U.S.	
65	Loss	55–9–1	Quirino Garcia	TKO	7 (10)	Mar 2, 2001	Ciudad Juárez, Mexico	
64	Loss	55–8–1	Antonio Margarito	RTD	4 (10), 3:00	Dec 10, 2000	Shrine Building, Memphis, Tennessee, U.S.	
63	Loss	55–7–1	Michele Piccirillo	UD	12	Dec 18, 1999	Padua, Italy	For WBU welterweight title
62	Loss	55–6–1	Oba Carr	UD	10	Feb 13, 1999	Thomas & Mack Center, Paradise, Nevada, U.S.	
61	Win	55–5–1	Juan Soberanes	TKO	6 (10)	Oct 17, 1998	CasaBlanca Resort, Mesquite, Nevada, U.S.	
60	Win	54–5–1	Danny Sanchez	TKO	5 (10), 2:32	Jul 10, 1998	Miccosukee Resort & Gaming, Miami, Florida, U.S.	
59	Loss	53–5–1	Khalid Rahilou	TKO	11 (12), 0:58	Jan 11, 1997	Nashville Arena, Nashville, Tennessee, U.S.	Lost WBA light welterweight title
58	Win	53–4–1	Juan Martin Coggi	UD	12	Aug 16, 1996	Sociedad Alemana de Gimnasia de Villa Ballester, Buenos Aires, Argentina	Won WBA light welterweight title
57	Loss	52–4–1	Juan Martin Coggi	TD	5 (12), 1:15	Jan 13, 1996	Jai-Alai Fronton, Miami, Florida, U.S.	Lost WBA light welterweight title; Split TD after Coggi could not continue from an accidental head clash
56	Win	52–3–1	Jose Rafael Barboza	SD	12	Jun 16, 1995	Palais des Sports de Gerland, Lyon, France	Retained WBA light welterweight title
55	Win	51–3–1	Rodney Moore	TKO	7 (12), 1:43	Dec 10, 1994	Estadio de Béisbol, Monterrey, Mexico	Retained WBA light welterweight title
54	Win	50–3–1	Juan Martin Coggi	UD	12	Sep 17, 1994	MGM Grand Garden Arena, Paradise, Nevada, U.S.	Won WBA light welterweight title
53	Loss	49–3–1	Julio César Chávez	TD	8 (12), 2:57	May 7, 1994	MGM Grand Garden Arena, Paradise, Nevada, U.S.	Lost WBC light welterweight title; Split TD after Chávez was cut from an accidental head clash
52	Win	49–2–1	Julio César Chávez	SD	12	Jan 29, 1994	MGM Grand Garden Arena, Paradise, Nevada, U.S.	Won WBC light welterweight title
51	Win	48–2–1	Francisco Lopez	TKO	3	Oct 23, 1993	Civic Arena, St. Joseph, Missouri, U.S.	
50	Win	47–2–1	Sergio Zambrano	KO	4 (10), 2:41	May 7, 1993	Sands Hotel and Casino, Paradise, Nevada, U.S.	
49	Win	46–2–1	Edwin Rosario	TKO	7 (10), 2:03	Jan 30, 1993	The Pyramid, Memphis, Tennessee, U.S.	
48	Win	45–2–1	Juan Carlos Nunez	TKO	2 (10), 0:50	Sep 12, 1992	Thomas & Mack Center, Paradise, Nevada, U.S.	
47	Win	44–2–1	Refugio Guerrero	KO	3 (10), 2:59	Aug 1, 1992	Las Vegas Hilton, Winchester, Nevada, U.S.	
46	Win	43–2–1	Juan Zuniga	TKO	4 (10), 2:07	Nov 29, 1991	The Mirage, Paradise, Nevada, U.S.	
45	Win	42–2–1	Martin Cruz	KO	1	Jun 8, 1991	Civic Arena, St. Joseph, Missouri, U.S.	
44	Win	41–2–1	Rodolfo Aguilar	PTS	8	Mar 29, 1991	Casino, Deauville, France	
43	Win	40–2–1	Jerry Page	UD	10	Aug 17, 1989	The Palace, Auburn Hills, Michigan, U.S.	
42	Win	39–2–1	Roger Brown	UD	10	Jun 15, 1989	Woodling Gym, Cleveland, Ohio, U.S.	
41	Win	38–2–1	Martin Rojas	TKO	7	May 12, 1989	St. John's Sheraton, Jacksonville, Florida, U.S.	
40	Win	37–2–1	Derrick McGuire	UD	10	Apr 22, 1989	The Palace, Auburn Hills, Michigan, U.S.	
39	Win	36–2–1	Eduardo Luciano	TKO	1 (10), 1:54	Dec 1, 1988	Gleason's Arena, New York City, New York, U.S.	
38	Win	35–2–1	Dwayne Brooks	TKO	2	Oct 22, 1988	Sports Arena, Bristol, Tennessee, U.S.	
37	Win	34–2–1	Anthony Rorie	KO	2	Jul 28, 1988	The Blue Horizon, Philadelphia, Pennsylvania, U.S.	
36	Win	33–2–1	Sebastian Wilburn	KO	1 (10), 2:57	May 10, 1988	Swingos Hotel, Cleveland, Ohio, U.S.	
35	Win	32–2–1	Ricardo Cardenas	TKO	1 (10)	Mar 18, 1988	Municipal Auditorium, Nashville, Tennessee, U.S.	
34	Loss	31–2–1	Primo Ramos	KO	2 (12), 2:30	Oct 28, 1987	Las Vegas Hilton, Winchester, Nevada, U.S.	For vacant NABF lightweight title
33	Win	31–1–1	Tim Burgess	UD	10	Jun 9, 1987	Steel Pier, Atlantic City, New Jersey, U.S.	
32	Win	30–1–1	Joe Edens	TKO	3 (10)	May 9, 1987	Viking Hall, Bristol, Tennessee, U.S.	
31	Win	29–1–1	Shelton LeBlanc	TKO	5 (10), 3:00	Mar 25, 1987	Steel Pier, Atlantic City, New Jersey, U.S.	
30	Win	28–1–1	Al Martino	TKO	2 (10), 1:36	Jan 16, 1987	Steel Pier, Atlantic City, New Jersey, U.S.	
29	Win	27–1–1	Aldemar Mosquera	KO	3 (10), 2:32	Oct 2, 1986	Steel Pier, Atlantic City, New Jersey, U.S.	
28	Draw	26–1–1	Freddie Pendleton	SD	12	Jul 4, 1986	Steel Pier, Atlantic City, New Jersey, U.S.	For vacant USBA lightweight title
27	Win	26–1	Sammy Fuentes	TKO	2 (10), 1:16	May 30, 1986	Trump Plaza Hotel and Casino, Atlantic City, New Jersey, U.S.	
26	Win	25–1	Efrain Nieves	TKO	2	Dec 12, 1985	Egypt Shriners Temple, Tampa, Florida, U.S.	
25	Win	24–1	Keith Jackson	TKO	4	Oct 5, 1985	Morristown, Tennessee, U.S.	
24	Loss	23–1	Edwin Rosario	PTS	10	Jun 16, 1985	York Hall, London, England	
23	Win	23–0	David Brown	UD	10	May 1, 1985	Tampa, Florida, U.S.	
22	Win	22–0	Freddie Pendleton	TKO	5 (10), 2:43	Mar 23, 1985	Viking Hall, Bristol, Tennessee, U.S.	
21	Win	21–0	Rashad Aziz	TKO	2	Jan 17, 1985	Tampa, Florida, U.S.	
20	Win	20–0	Shelton Nixon	TKO	2	Nov 24, 1984	Bristol, Tennessee, U.S.	
19	Win	19–0	Ezzard Charles Adams	PTS	10	Oct 17, 1984	Tampa, Florida, U.S.	
18	Win	18–0	Eduardo Lugo	TKO	4	Sep 11, 1984	Tampa, Florida, U.S.	
17	Win	17–0	Jose Gonzales	TKO	6	Aug 30, 1984	Morristown, Tennessee, U.S.	
16	Win	16–0	Steve Mitchell	TKO	3 (10), 1:37	Jul 12, 1984	Curtis Hixon Hall, Tampa, Florida, U.S.	
15	Win	15–0	Jose Rentas	TKO	2	Jun 21, 1984	Egypt Shriners Temple, Tampa, Florida, U.S.	
14	Win	14–0	Jerome Artis	KO	2	May 3, 1984	Egypt Shriners Temple, Tampa, Florida, U.S.	
13	Win	13–0	Ezequiel Mosquera	PTS	8	Mar 15, 1984	Curtis Hixon Hall, Tampa, Florida, U.S.	
12	Win	12–0	Luis De Jesus	TKO	3	Feb 1, 1984	Curtis Hixon Hall, Tampa, Florida, U.S.	
11	Win	11–0	Reese Smith	TKO	4	Dec 2, 1983	Tampa, Florida, U.S.	
10	Win	10–0	Richard Lassiter	TKO	5	Nov 12, 1983	USF Sun Dome, Tampa, Florida, U.S.	
9	Win	9–0	Adolfo Marquez	TKO	4	Oct 21, 1983	Monroe, Louisiana, U.S.	
8	Win	8–0	Freddie Guzman	KO	6	Sep 16, 1983	Tampa, Florida, U.S.	
7	Win	7–0	Willie Taylor	DQ	4	Jun 25, 1983	Pennington Gap, Virginia, U.S.	
6	Win	6–0	Charles Sweetenburg	TKO	2	May 26, 1983	Host Resort, Knoxville, Tennessee, U.S.	
5	Win	5–0	Charles Sweetenburg	TKO	1	May 12, 1983	Host Resort, Bristol, Tennessee, U.S.	
4	Win	4–0	Frank Mackey	TKO	2	Apr 2, 1983	Host Resort, Lancaster, Pennsylvania, U.S.	
3	Win	3–0	Don Thorpe	KO	1	Mar 12, 1983	Raceland, Kentucky, U.S.	
2	Win	2–0	Marcel Wade	TKO	2	Feb 19, 1983	Las Vegas, Nevada, U.S.	
1	Win	1–0	Curtis Gholston	KO	2	Feb 4, 1983	Knoxville, Tennessee, U.S.	Professional debut

Sporting positions
World boxing titles
Preceded by Julio César Chávez	WBC light welterweight champion January 29, 1994 – May 7, 1994	Succeeded by Julio César Chávez
Preceded by Julio César Chávez	Lineal light welterweight champion January 29, 1994 – May 7, 1994	Succeeded by Julio César Chávez
Preceded by Juan Martin Coggi	WBA light welterweight champion September 17, 1994 – January 13, 1996	Succeeded by Juan Martin Coggi
Preceded by Juan Martin Coggi	WBA light welterweight champion August 16, 1996 – January 11, 1997	Succeeded by Khalid Rahilou
