= Lennox Lewis vs. Tony Tucker =

Boxing competition

Star Spangled Glory
- Date: May 8, 1993
- Venue: Thomas & Mack Center, Paradise, Nevada, U.S.
- Title(s) on the line: WBC Heavyweight Championship

Tale of the tape
Boxer	Lennox Lewis	Tony Tucker
Nickname	The Lion	TNT
Hometown	London, England	Houston, Texas, U.S.
Purse	$9,150,000	$3,050,000
Pre-fight record	22–0 (19 KO)	48–1 (1) (39 KO)
Age	27 years, 8 months	34 years, 4 months
Height	6 ft 4 1/2 in (194 cm)	6 ft 5 in (196 cm)
Weight	235 lb (107 kg)	235 lb (107 kg)
Style	Orthodox	Orthodox
Recognition	WBC; Heavyweight Champion; The Ring; No. 2 Ranked Heavyweight	WBC; No. 1 Ranked Heavyweight; The Ring; No. 5 Ranked Heavyweight; Former heavyweight champion

Result
- Lewis wins via 12-round unanimous decision (118–111, 117–111, 116–112)

Lennox Lewis vs. Tony Tucker, billed as Star Spangled Glory, was a heavyweight professional boxing match contested between WBC champion Lennox Lewis and the WBC's number one ranked contender Tony Tucker. The bout took place on May 8, 1993 at the Thomas & Mack Center in Paradise, Nevada, U.S. Lewis retained his WBC title via unanimous decision.

== Background ==
After defeating the WBC's number one ranked heavyweight Donovan "Razor" Ruddock on October 31, 1992, Lennox Lewis became the mandatory challenger for the WBC heavyweight title, which at the time was unified with both the WBA and IBF versions of the heavyweight title.

Two weeks after his victory over Ruddock, challenger Riddick Bowe defeated champion Evander Holyfield to claim all three titles and become the new undisputed heavyweight champion.

Bowe and Lewis' camps attempted to get a deal done but negotiations broke down after Lewis' manager Kellie Maloney rejected both deals that Bowe's manager Rock Newman offered. The first deal offered was a 90–10 split between the two fighters that would net Lewis $3 million while Bowe would take home $29 million, but Maloney refused the deal, calling it "absurd". Newman then offered Lewis $2.5 million to take an interim fight against an opponent of his choosing after which he would proceed with his championship fight with Bowe where he would earn an additional $9 million but that deal was also refused.

Because a deal could not be made, Bowe instead chose to vacate his WBC title and proceeded to make the first defense of his remaining titles against Michael Dokes. Based on the strength of his victory over Ruddock, the WBC decided to name Lewis the new WBC heavyweight champion.

Though George Foreman had been brought up by Lewis as a possible opponent, he ultimately agreed to face the WBC's number one contender Tony Tucker in his first defense. Tucker briefly held the IBF heavyweight title in 1987 but lost it in his first defense against Mike Tyson only three months later. After his loss to Tyson, Tucker was out of boxing for over two years before launching a comeback late in 1989. Tucker was then able to put together a string of 14 consecutive wins to get his record up 48–1 by the time of his fight with Lewis.

Despite his impressive record, Tucker was given little chance of defeating Lewis and came into the fight as a 6–1 underdog.

== The fights ==
=== Jackson vs. McClellan ===
Star-Spangled Glory: Jackson vs. McClellan
- Title(s) on the line: WBC middleweight title

Tale of the tape
Boxer	Julian Jackson	Gerald McClellan
Nickname	The Hawk	The G-Man
Hometown	Saint Thomas, U.S. Virgin Islands	Freeport, Illinois, U.S.
Purse	$350,000	$90,000
Pre-fight record	46–1 (43 KOs)	27–2 (25 KOs)
Age	32 years, 7 months	25 years, 6 months
Height	5 ft 11 in (180 cm)	6 ft 1 in (185 cm)
Weight	159 lb (72 kg)	160 lb (73 kg)
Style	Orthodox	Orthodox
Recognition	WBC; Middleweight Champion; The Ring; No. 1 Ranked Middleweight; 2-division world champion	The Ring; No. 5 Ranked Middleweight; Former WBO middleweight titleholder

Result
- McClellan wins via 5th-round technical knockout

The first of the three world title bouts on the card saw WBC middleweight champion make his fifth defence against former WBO titleholder Gerald McClellan. Jackson was a 9 to 5 favourite to win.

==== Fight details ====
McClellan was rocked by a big overhand right within the first 30 seconds of the bout, with his knees almost touching the canvas. Jackson recovered to cause a slight cut over McClellan's left eye in the 2nd. An unintentional head butt gashed Jackson's left eye late in the third round. As per the then WBC rules McClellan was deduced a point by referee Mills Lane.

In the fifth round Jackson hurt McClellan with a pair of low blows, with the challenger using a full 30 seconds to recover before resuming the bout.

Shortly after the resumption, a right hand followed by two left hooks to the head sent Jackson down. He beat the count but McClellan would send him again down again with a straight right hand to the jaw. Jackson again made it do his feet but Lane didn't like what he saw and opted to wave the bout off, giving McClellan a TKO victory.

==== Aftermath ====
McClellan was linked to a bout against WBC light middleweight champion Terry Norris.

Preceded by vs. Eddie Hall	Julian Jackson's bouts 8 May 1993	Succeeded by vs. Carlton Haywood
Preceded by vs. Tyrone Moore	Gerald McClellan's bouts 8 May 1993	Succeeded by vs. Jay Bell
Awards
Previous: Akinobu Hiranaka vs. Morris East; Welcome Ncita vs. Kennedy McKinney	The Ring Knockout of the Year; 1993	Next: Michael Moorer vs. George Foreman
Previous: Lennox Lewis vs. Donovan Ruddock	KO Magazine Knockout of the Year; 1993	Award Discontinued

=== Chávez vs. Alli ===
The penultimate bout on the card would see unbeaten WBC super lightweight champion Julio César Chávez face No. 1 ranked contender (The Ring:3rd) Terrence Alli.

==== Fight details ====
Chávez would dominate the bout forcing Alli to spend much of the bout in retreat.

Early in the 6th round, the challenger was sent to the canvas with a six-punch flurry, the last being a left hand. He beat the count but another Chávez barrage ensued.

Referee Carlos Padilla Jr. would step in between the two boxers which Chávez took to mean that the bout was being waved off and as such turned and walked to his corner. Alli, who did not seem badly injured, begged to be allowed to continue and Padilla appeared to relente and waved him toward Chávez. However at that point Chávez was almost back to his stool hence he then decided to end the fight once and for all.

==== Aftermath ====
Chávez would criticize the referee's performance saying "I didn't like the way the referee handled the fight. I didn't like the knockdown count."

Preceded by vs. Silvio Walter Rojas	Julio César Chávez's bouts 8 May 1993	Succeeded by vs. Pernell Whitaker
Preceded by vs. Juan Carlos Nunez	Terrence Alli's bouts 8 May 1993	Succeeded by vs. Brandon Croly

=== Main Event ===
Like his previous championship fight with Tyson, Tucker was able to go the full twelve rounds with the much younger Lewis but was unable to put together much offense during the bout. Lewis was able to twice knockdown Tucker, who had previously never been knocked down in 50 fights as a professional. The first came during the final minute of the third round. Tucker attempted to hit Lewis with a jab with about 40 seconds left, but Lewis was able to dodge it and quickly landed a strong right hook that dropped Tucker to the canvas for the first time in his career. In round eight, Tucker seemingly had Lewis in trouble after landing an over 20-punch combination late in the round. However, Lewis would turn the tables on Tucker and dominate the final 25 seconds of the round, landing several power punches that clearly hurt Tucker, who tried in vain to clinch Lewis and survive the remainder of the round. After failing to hold on to Lewis, Tucker backed into the corner with 10 seconds left and was promptly met with a three-punch combination from Lewis, though he was able to get a hold of Lewis and survive the round without being knocked down. As round nine began, Lewis charged at Tucker and was quickly able to gain a second knockdown after landing a right hook to the side of Tucker's head. Nevertheless, Tucker was able to survive the remainder of the fight, but Lewis was able to pick up a lopsided unanimous decision with scores of 118–111, 117–111 and 116–112. The Associated Press scored it 117–110 for Lewis.

This was the first major heavyweight title bout won by a European boxer since Ingemar Johansson defeated Floyd Patterson in June 1959.

== Aftermath ==
Lewis next agreed to face compatriot Frank Bruno in an historic all british heavyweight bout in Cardiff.

== Undercard ==
Confirmed bouts:

Winner	Loser	Weight division/title belt(s) disputed	Result
(Mexico) Julio César Chávez	(Guyana) Terrence Alli	WBC super lightweight title	6th round TKO
(United States) Gerald McClellan	(United States Virgin Islands) Julian Jackson	WBC middleweight title	5th round TKO
Non-TV bouts
(Puerto Rico) Héctor Camacho	(United States) Eric Podolak	Light middleweight (10 rounds)	5th round TKO
(United States) Thomas Tate	(United States) Eddie Hall	Middleweight (10 rounds)	1st round TKO
(United States) Meldrick Taylor	(United States) Henry Hughes	Light middleweight (10 rounds)	2nd round RTD
(United States) Oba Carr	(United States) Eriberto Valdez	Welterweight (10 rounds)	Unanimous decision
(Nigeria) King Ipitan	(United States) Sam Adkins	Heavyweight (4 rounds)	3rd round DQ

== Broadcasting ==
Country	Broadcaster
Canada	TSN
France	Canal+
United Kingdom	Sky Sports
United States	Showtime

Preceded by vs. Donovan Ruddock	Lennox Lewis's bouts 8 May 1993	Succeeded by vs. Frank Bruno
Preceded by vs. Frankie Swindell	Tony Tucker's bouts 8 May 1993	Succeeded by vs. David Graves
