= Gerald McClellan =

American boxer (born 1967)

Personal information
- Nickname: The G-Man
- Born: Gerald Allen McClellan; October 23, 1967 (age 58) Freeport, Illinois, U.S.
- Height: 6 ft 1 in (185 cm)
- Weight: Middleweight; Super middleweight

Boxing career
- Reach: 77 in (196 cm)
- Stance: Orthodox

Boxing record
- Total fights: 34
- Wins: 31
- Win by KO: 29
- Losses: 3

Gerald Allen McClellan (born October 23, 1967) is an American former professional boxer who competed from 1988 to 1995. He is a two-time middleweight world champion, having held the WBO title from 1991 to 1992, and the WBC title from 1993 to 1995. McClellan was forced to retire from boxing after a severe brain injury suffered during his final fight in 1995, a loss to WBC super middleweight champion Nigel Benn.

Known for his formidable punching power and one of the highest 1st-round-knockout ratios in the history of boxing, McClellan was dubbed "a miniature Mike Tyson" by his promoter, Don King (Tyson himself, while incarcerated, reportedly called McClellan "the best fighter in the world"). The Ring magazine rated McClellan No. 27 on their list of the "100 Greatest Punchers Of All Time". In 2007, McClellan was inducted into the World Boxing Hall of Fame in California, not to be confused with the more widely recognized International Boxing Hall of Fame in Canastota.

== Amateur career ==
As an amateur, McClellan was a four-time Wisconsin Golden Gloves champion, 1984–1987, competing mostly in the junior middleweight division.

=== Highlights ===
National Golden Gloves (147 lbs), Little Rock, Arkansas, March 1985:

- 1/4: Lost to Roy Richie DQ 3

U.S. Olympic Festival (156 lbs), Houston, Texas, July 1986:

- Finals: Lost to Thomas Tate by split decision, 2–3

(gold) U.S. National Championships (156 lbs), Buffalo, New York, March–April 1987:

- 1/4: Defeated Keith Graves by unanimous decision, 5–0
- 1/2: Defeated Kevin Grantham by unanimous decision, 5–0
- Finals: Defeated Tim Littles by unanimous decision, 5–0

U.S. Olympic Festival (156 lbs), Raleigh, North Carolina, July 1987:

- 1/2: Lost to Ray McElroy by split decision, 2–3

| class="col-break col-break-2" | Pan Am Box-offs (156 lbs), International Center of the Broadmoor, Colorado Springs, Colorado, July 1987:

- Lost to Frank Liles

U.S. National Championships (156 lbs), Olympic Sports Center, Colorado Springs, Colorado, March 1988:

- 1/8: Defeated Scott Felde RSC 2 (2:03)
- 1/4: Lost to Johnny Tapia DQ 2

National Golden Gloves (156 lbs), Omaha, Nebraska, May 1988:

- 1/4: Defeated David Gamble KO 2
- 1/2: Defeated Roy Jones Jr. by split decision, 3–2
- Finals: Lost to Ray McElroy by split decision, 2–3

He trained with Kronk Gym being trained by Emanuel Steward. After turning pro, he also fought out of a Palmer Park gym run by Sugar Ray Leonard.

== Professional career ==
"He seems like dynamo."

— Mike Tyson speaks on McClellan.

McClellan turned professional in 1988. Trained by hall of fame trainer Emanuel Steward, his early career was notable for a propensity for quick victories by knockout: only two of his first 29 fights went beyond the third round, although he lost both of those on the scorecard (in 6 rounds against Dennis Milton, 8 against Ralph Ward, in successive fights.) However, these proved only a momentary check on his career.

In 1991 he captured the vacant WBO middleweight title by knocking out John Mugabi in one round. A planned defence against Tyrone Trice set for July 23, 1992 didn't happen and he spent the year in non title bouts at super middleweight before vacating the belt to get his shot at the WBC middleweight title

=== Middleweight champion ===
On May 8, 1993 McClellan became middleweight champion by knocking out Julian Jackson after five rounds. McClellan had survived some brutally hard punches from Jackson in the second and third rounds.

McClellan defended the WBC title three times, all first round stoppages, including a rematch with Jackson.

In the fall of 1994, McClellan separated from his long-term trainer Emanuel Steward.

=== Benn vs McClellan ===
McClellan moved up in weight to challenge WBC super middleweight champion Nigel Benn in London on February 25, 1995. The fight was watched by an estimated 17 million people on television and 10,300 paying spectators.

In a savage bout, McClellan knocked Benn out of the ring in round one and scored another knockdown in round eight, but each time Benn was able to work his way back into the fight. Throughout the fight Gerald received several punches to the back of the head, known to be especially dangerous, without referee interference. Referee Alfred Azaro was also roundly criticized for his officiating mistakes, which included impeding the challenger's progress when McClellan was trying to finish off Benn in round 1. McClellan was noticeably blinking repeatedly early in round ten, during which, after receiving a single hard blow from Benn who himself then stumbled and caught the eye of McClellan's with his shoulder as Benn went down, at this point McClellen voluntarily went down, taking a knee again. McClellan took the mandatory eight count and the fight was resumed, but he did not throw another punch, and moments later he dropped to his knee for a second time and allowed Azaro to count him out. After the fight was over, McClellan immediately stood up and walked to his corner under his own power. He then sat down on the canvas and leaned against the ring apron, but while being attended to by ring physicians he slumped onto his back and lost consciousness. McClellan was subsequently strapped to a stretcher and rushed to the hospital.

=== Aftermath ===
McClellan had emergency surgery to remove a blood clot from his brain. He spent eleven days in a coma and was found to have suffered extensive brain damage. He lost his eyesight, the ability to walk unassisted, and was reported as being 80 percent deaf. Sports Illustrated ran an article about the fight and its outcome one week after the fight. McClellan's family flew to London to be by his side, and he was later flown back to his home country. He has recently recovered some ability to walk with the assistance of a cane, but he has not recovered his eyesight. In addition to being blind, his short-term memory was also profoundly affected. His three sisters, particularly Lisa McClellan, are responsible for his care. In a 2011 documentary broadcast by ITV (which originally screened the fight live in the UK), Lisa stated that Gerald is in fact not deaf, but that he has trouble with comprehension when spoken to.

Tarick Salmaci, a Kronk Gym fighter, claimed later in an interview that he had sparred with McClellan over a year before the Benn fight, and that after McClellan was hit by a jab thrown by Salmaci, McClellan started to blink hard and the session had to be stopped. McClellan initially claimed that he was thumbed, but later admitted to Salmaci in the locker room that he was in fact seriously hurt. Salmaci said that he found it strange that a fighter with McClellan's chin wearing headgear was being hurt by a jab, and that when he noticed McClellan blinking during the Benn fight in the same way, Salmaci was immediately aware that McClellan was in serious trouble. Also notable in hindsight was McClellan complaining of getting regular headaches after his first fight with Julian Jackson in May 1993. In the fight, McClellan's chin resisted Jackson's formidable punching power before McClellan won the fight in round 5, but Jackson's punches may have done some damage to McClellan's brain, such as concussions, that were not noticed at the time.

== Fundraising ==
McClellan has been the honoree at numerous banquets and award ceremonies, and fellow boxing world champion Roy Jones Jr., often pointed out as a rival middleweight champion during 1993–94 (indeed, McClellan actually beat Jones as an amateur), set up a foundation to help McClellan.

Nigel Benn himself has also helped to raise funds for McClellan's treatment, and the two men would meet again for the first time since their bout at a fundraiser held in London on February 24, 2007. Several items were auctioned off at the event and a total of £200,000 was raised.

In May 2012, the World Boxing Council publicly appealed for donations to a trust fund set up in McClellan's name in order to help his sister Lisa maintain his 24-hour care. In July 2017, McClellan took a turn for the worse, and underwent surgery to repair a malfunctioning colon. McClellan now uses a colostomy bag, and incurs colostomy supply expenses of about 500 dollars a month. Former world light middleweight champion Terry Norris, whose Final Fight Foundation acts to protect boxers, made an appeal for the Gerald McClellan Trust, noting, "McClellan's organs are starting to shut down because of his brain injury." Ring 10, a nonprofit organization that helps impoverished former fighters, provides McClellan with monthly food credit and raises funds to assist with payment of other necessities.

== Dog fighting controversy ==
According to an article in The Observer, McClellan participated in dog fighting. McClellan's trainer and family admitted that McClellan was involved with fighting pitbulls, and on one occasion had used tape to bind the jaws of a Labrador shut before allowing his pet pit bull "Deuce" to kill it.

== Professional boxing record ==
34 fights	31 wins	3 losses
By knockout	29	1
By decision	2	2

No.	Result	Record	Opponent	Type	Round, time	Date	Location	Notes
34	Loss	31–3	Nigel Benn	TKO	10 (12), 1:46	Feb 25, 1995	London Arena, London, England	For WBC super middleweight title
33	Win	31–2	Julian Jackson	KO	1 (12), 1:23	May 7, 1994	MGM Grand Garden Arena, Paradise, Nevada, U.S.	Retained WBC middleweight title
32	Win	30–2	Gilbert Baptist	TKO	1 (12), 1:37	Mar 4, 1994	MGM Grand Garden Arena, Paradise, Nevada, U.S.	Retained WBC middleweight title
31	Win	29–2	Jay Bell	KO	1 (12), 0:30	Aug 6, 1993	Coliseo Rubén Rodríguez, Bayamón, Puerto Rico	Retained WBC middleweight title
30	Win	28–2	Julian Jackson	TKO	5 (12), 2:09	May 8, 1993	Thomas & Mack Center, Paradise, Nevada, U.S.	Won WBC middleweight title
29	Win	27–2	Tyrone Moore	TKO	2 (10)	Feb 20, 1993	Estadio Azteca, Mexico City, Mexico	
28	Win	26–2	Steve Harvey	TKO	1 (8), 1:51	Nov 7, 1992	Caesars Tahoe, Stateline, Nevada, U.S.	
27	Win	25–2	Carl Sullivan	TKO	1 (10), 0:45	May 15, 1992	Etess Arena, Atlantic City, New Jersey, U.S.	
26	Win	24–2	Lester Yarbrough	TKO	1 (10), 2:02	Feb 24, 1992	The Palace, Auburn Hills, Michigan, U.S.	
25	Win	23–2	John Mugabi	TKO	1 (12), 2:51	Nov 20, 1991	Royal Albert Hall, London, England	Won vacant WBO middleweight title
24	Win	22–2	Sammy Brooks	TKO	1 (8), 2:07	Aug 13, 1991	The Palace, Auburn Hills, Michigan, U.S.	
23	Win	21–2	Ivory Teague	TKO	3 (10)	Jul 27, 1991	Scope, Norfolk, Virginia, U.S.	
22	Win	20–2	Ken Hulsey	KO	1 (10)	Mar 1, 1991	Pioneer Hall, Duluth, Minnesota, U.S.	
21	Win	19–2	Danny Mitchell	KO	1 (10), 2:37	Dec 15, 1990	Civic Arena, Pittsburgh, Pennsylvania, U.S.	
20	Win	18–2	José Carlos da Silva	TKO	3 (8)	Nov 14, 1990	Phoenix, Arizona, U.S.	
19	Win	17–2	Charles Hollis	PTS	8	Sep 14, 1990	Beloit, Wisconsin, U.S.	
18	Win	16–2	Sanderline Williams	UD	8	Aug 21, 1990	The Palace, Auburn Hills, Michigan, U.S.	
17	Win	15–2	James Fernandez	TKO	2 (8)	Jun 12, 1990	Landmark Hotel, Metairie, Louisiana, U.S.	
16	Win	14–2	Brinatty Maquilon	TKO	3 (8), 1:42	Apr 26, 1990	Resorts International Casino, Atlantic City, New Jersey, U.S.	
15	Win	13–2	Ron Martin	TKO	1 (8)	Mar 10, 1990	Bristol, Tennessee, U.S.	
14	Win	12–2	James Williamson	KO	1 (8), 1:55	Jan 20, 1990	The Palace, Auburn Hills, Michigan, U.S.	
13	Win	11–2	Rick Caldwell	KO	1 (8)	Dec 14, 1989	Civic Center, Saginaw, Michigan, U.S.	
12	Loss	10–2	Ralph Ward	UD	8	Sep 21, 1989	Atlantic City, New Jersey, U.S.	
11	Loss	10–1	Dennis Milton	PTS	6	Jun 24, 1989	Convention Hall, Atlantic City, New Jersey, U.S.	
10	Win	10–0	Terrence Wright	TKO	1 (8), 2:00	Apr 14, 1989	Auditorium, Milwaukee, Wisconsin, U.S.	
9	Win	9–0	Tyrone McKnight	TKO	2 (8)	Feb 19, 1989	High School Gym, Monessen, Pennsylvania, U.S.	
8	Win	8–0	Anthony Jackson	KO	1 (6), 1:30	Feb 10, 1989	Cedar Creek Ice & Expo Center, Wausau, Wisconsin, U.S.	
7	Win	7–0	Joe Goodman	KO	2 (6)	Feb 4, 1989	Hilton Hotel Grand Casino Room, Biloxi, Mississippi, U.S.	
6	Win	6–0	Jerome Kelly	TKO	1 (6), 1:52	Dec 3, 1988	Brook Park, Ohio, U.S.	
5	Win	5–0	John Gordon	TKO	2 (6), 1:45	Nov 25, 1988	The Palace, Auburn Hills, Michigan, U.S.	
4	Win	4–0	Roberto Abondo	TKO	1 (4), 0:36	Nov 22, 1988	Bally's Las Vegas, Paradise, Nevada, U.S.	
3	Win	3–0	Danny Lowry	TKO	1 (6), 2:00	Nov 3, 1988	Showboat Hotel and Casino, Las Vegas, Nevada, U.S.	
2	Win	2–0	Bill Davis	TKO	1 (4)	Sep 15, 1988	La Fontaine Bleue, Glen Burnie, Maryland, U.S.	
1	Win	1–0	Roy Hundley	KO	1 (4)	Aug 12, 1988	The Eagles Club, Milwaukee, Wisconsin, U.S.	

Sporting positions
World boxing titles
Vacant Title last held by Chris Eubank	WBO middleweight champion November 20, 1991 – April 2, 1993; Vacated	Vacant Title next held by Chris Pyatt
Preceded by Julian Jackson	WBC middleweight champion May 8, 1993 – January 5, 1995; Vacated	Vacant Title next held by Julian Jackson
Awards
Previous: Morris East; TKO11 Akinobu Hiranaka and Kennedy McKinney; KO11 Welcome Ncita	The Ring Knockout of the Year; TKO5 Julian Jackson; 1993	Next: George Foreman; KO10 Michael Moorer
