= T-League =

T-League or T League may refer to:

- Thai football leagues, see Thai football league system
  - Thai League 1
- T.League, Japanese table tennis league
- National Premier Leagues Tasmania
