= Donovan Boucher =

Jamaican/Canadian boxer (born 1961)

Personal information
- Nationality: Jamaican/Canadian
- Born: 8 August 1961 (age 65) Jamaica
- Weight: welter/light middle/middle/super middleweight

Boxing career

Boxing record
- Total fights: 40
- Wins: 33 (KO 18)
- Losses: 7 (KO 4)

Donovan Boucher (born August 8, 1961) is a Jamaican/Canadian professional welter/light middle/middle/super middleweight boxer of the 1980s, '90s and 2000s who won the Canada welterweight title, and Commonwealth welterweight title, and was a challenger for World Boxing Association (WBA) Inter-Continental welterweight title against Glenwood Brown, World Boxing Association (WBA) World welterweight title against Crisanto España, and Canada light middleweight title against Gareth Sutherland, his professional fighting weight varied from 144 lb (65 kg; 10 st 4 lb), i.e. welterweight to 161 lb (73 kg; 11 st 7 lb), i.e. super middleweight.
