= Juan Martín Coggi =

Argentine boxer

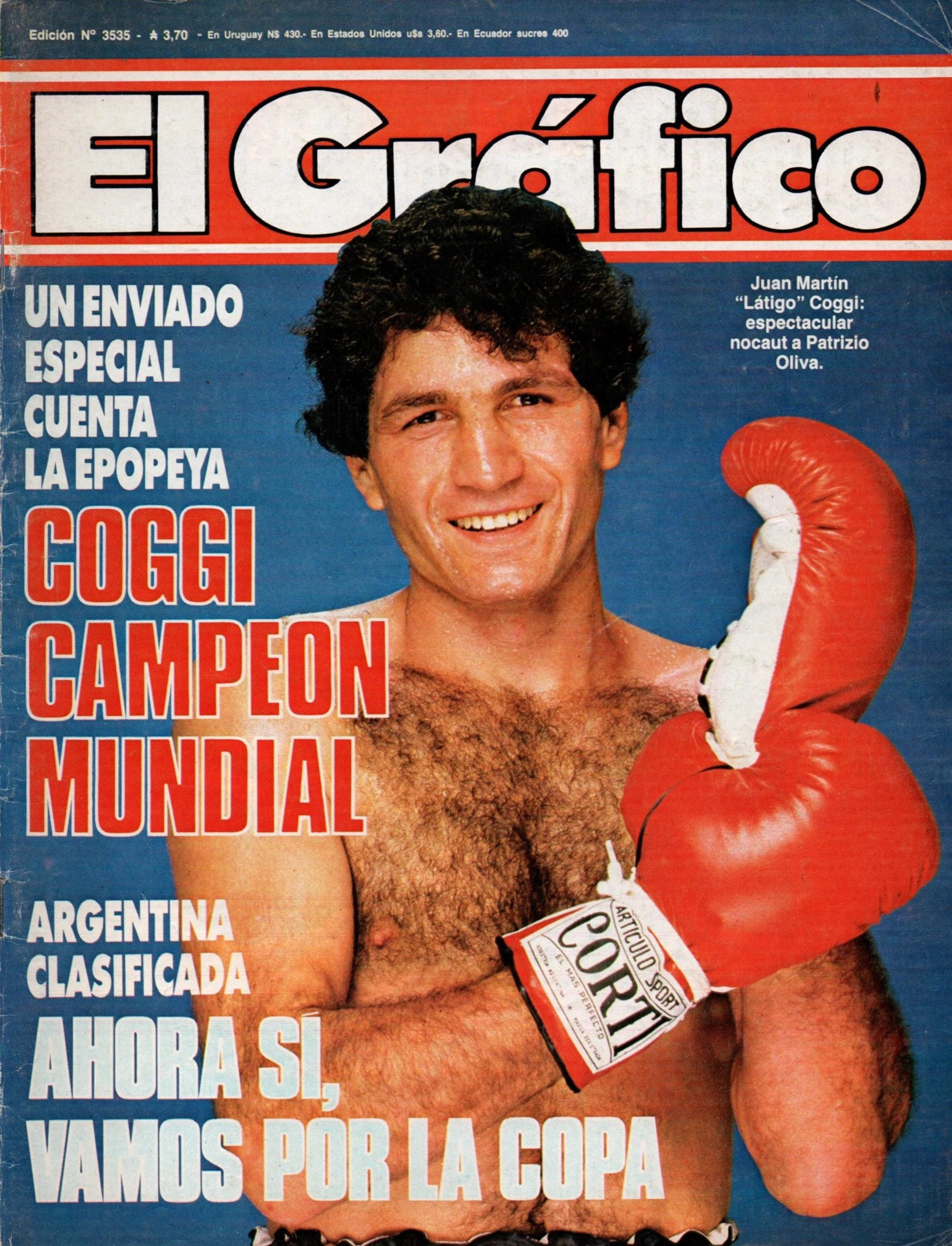
- Coggi on a 1987 cover of El Gráfico

Personal information
- Nickname: El Látigo (The Whip)
- Born: Juan Martin Coggi; 19 December 1961 (age 64) Fighiera, Rosario, Santa Fe, Argentina
- Height: 5 ft 7 in (170 cm)
- Weight: Light welterweight

Boxing career
- Reach: 73 in (185 cm)
- Stance: Southpaw

Boxing record
- Total fights: 82
- Wins: 75
- Win by KO: 44
- Losses: 5
- Draws: 2

Juan Martin Coggi (born 19 December 1961) is a former boxer from Argentina. A native of Santa Fe Province (he lived as a child until a few years Brandsen, Buenos Aires Province), which was also the birthplace of Carlos Monzón, Coggi was a three-time world light welterweight champion. He had 75 wins, 5 losses and 2 draws, with 44 wins by knockout. He never lost a fight by knockout.

== Early boxing career ==
After a stellar amateur career, Coggi became a professional boxer on 2 April 1982, knocking out Horacio Valdes in four rounds at La Plata. Coggi won seven of his first ten bouts by knockout. The first boxer to last the scheduled distance with him was Viterman Sanchez, who lost a six-round decision to Coggi on 7 May 1982.

Coggi went undefeated for 21 bouts, with 11 knockout wins. Then, on 9 March 1985, he met Adolfo Arce Rossi in Buenos Aires. Arce Rossi became the first boxer to defeat Coggi by outpointing him over ten rounds. After one more win, Coggi fought to a draw over ten rounds with Ramon Collado, on 20 June of that same year.

Coggi went on a six-fight winning streak before he and Collado met again. Once again, Collado held him to a ten-round draw, on 19 July 1986.

On 25 October of that year, Coggi won the Argentine light welterweight title, knocking out Hugo Hernandez in three rounds.

== Championship career ==
Despite having a record that included no one of apparent relevance, the WBA placed Coggi on top of their list of challengers for the world crown at the light welterweight division. After one more win, Coggi challenged for the world title for the first time.

The WBA's world champion, Patrizio Oliva, had dethroned Coggi's countryman, Ubaldo Sacco, to win the world championship. So the fight between Coggi and Oliva generated much interest among Argentine boxing fans. Coggi's first title try was also his first fight abroad, as the fight was held in Ribera, Italy, on 4 July 1987. Coggi caused a minor upset when he knocked out Oliva in three rounds to become world champion.

Like Monzon, Coggi also became well liked in Italy despite the fact he had beaten an Italian for the world championship. Coggi would fight in Italy a number of times during the rest of his career. His first title defense came in Italy, when he knocked out Sang-Ho Lee in two rounds on 7 May 1988.

After beating Lee, he would win four non-title bouts in his country, including two ten-round decisions over Jorge Tejada, who later became a contender in the welterweight division.

For his second defense, Coggi returned to Italy, where he defeated perennial contender Harold Brazier of the United States by a twelve-round unanimous decision on 21 January 1989.

His third defense, on 29 April 1989, was also held in Italy. He defeated future world champion Akinobu Hiranaka by a twelve-round decision. However, this match was controversial for the decision: Coggi was knocked down by Hiranaka twice at 3rd round. Among many boxing fans, there have been the strong voice that the victory should have been given to Hiranaka . After two non title wins, Coggi had four fights in France, beginning with a fourth-round knockout victory over Jesse Williams in another non-title bout.

On 24 March 1990, Coggi beat the former lightweight champion José Luis Ramírez by a twelve-round unanimous decision to retain the title. After beating Danilo Cabrera by knockout in round five, Coggi defended his title in Nice against the relatively unheralded Loreto Garza of Sacramento, California, on 17 August. This time around, it was Coggi's turn to lose in a mild upset, as Garza became the champion by outpointing Coggi over twelve rounds.

On his next fight, held on 11 November at Buenos Aires, Coggi once again outpointed Tejada over ten rounds.

His next fight happened under extremely unlikely circumstances: he was in Sacramento to watch Garza defend his world title and, at the same time, challenge him to a rematch, when one of the boxers to be featured as part of the night's undercard suffered a car accident at the ARCO Arena parking lot and broke his wrist. Coggi took on the role of substitute fighter, and he beat Alberto Alcaraz by a knockout in round seven, 1 December.

Coggi went on to win his next eleven fights, six of them by knockout, before challenging Morris East for the WBA title on 12 January 1993, in Mar del Plata. Coggi became a light welterweight champion for the second time that night when he knocked East out in eight rounds.

On 10 April 1993, he made his first defense of his second reign, knocking out perennial Puerto Rican world title challenger Joe Rivera in seven rounds, in Mar del Plata. Next, he defended against Hiroyuki Yoshino on 23 June. In what marked his Asian debut, Coggi knocked Yoshino out in five rounds, in a fight held in Tokyo, Japan.

He defended his title three more times in 1993. On 13 August, he outpointed Jose Rafael Barbosa over twelve rounds in Buenos Aires, once again, retaining the world title. On 24 September, he knocked out Guillermo Cruz in ten rounds at Tucumán.

=== Bouts with Eder Gonzalez ===
On 11 December 1993, Coggi defended his title against the WBA's number ten contender Eder Gonzalez in Tucumán. In the second round, Gonzalez knocked Coggi down with a right hand and appeared to have him on the verge of a knockout when fight referee Isidro Rodriguez stopped the action, giving Coggi time to recover, at one point even helping Coggi remain on his feet. In the confusion, Gonzalez believed the referee had ended the fight and that he had won, but Rodriguez motioned for them to resume. A member of Coggi's corner then leapt onto the ring apron, grabbed Coggi and fended off Gonzalez' attacks. The round ended about 20 seconds prematurely, thanks to Coggi's compatriot Jorge Fernando Castro grabbing the timekeeper's hammer and ringing the bell.

The rest period between rounds, which should last one minute, also lasted about 90 seconds. In the third round, with Coggi still visibly hurt, Gonzalez landed 25 unanswered blows before the referee again intervened to give him time to recover. The timekeeper rang the bell to end the round 27 seconds early. In round five, Gonzalez knocked Coggi down, which was ruled a slip by the referee. Coggi began to recuperate and eventually knocked Gonzalez out in the seventh round.

Due to the controversy, the WBA ordered an immediate rematch, this time to take place in Las Vegas, Nevada on 18 March 1994, which marked Coggi's American debut. Referee Isidro Rodriguez was banned from boxing for life by the WBA. Coggi knocked Gonzalez out in three rounds, retaining the title.

=== Bouts with Frankie Randall ===
On 17 September 1994, he began a series of three bouts with former Chávez-conqueror Frankie Randall, who relieved Coggi of the title by beating him by a twelve-round unanimous decision. Coggi suffered three knockdowns during the fight.

Coggi had two more wins, then he faced Randall for the second time. Coggi became champion for the third time on 13 January 1996, when he beat Randall by a fifth round technical decision. Randall was controlling the fight when he went down when his feet became tangled with Coggi in the third round. Because Coggi landed a glancing blow as Randall went down, Coggi was credited with a knockdown by the referee. In the fifth round, the two fighters clashed heads and Coggi walked to his corner and lay down. The referee tried to convince Coggi to fight but he was either unwilling or unable to do so. The ringside physician later said that Coggi was coherent and when Coggi was examined at a hospital after the fight, he was given a clean bill of health. The fight went to the scorecards and Coggi was ahead on all judges' cards by one point (due to the knockdown called against Randall in the third round).

The third fight between Coggi and Randall came on 16 August, at Buenos Aires. Coggi suffered a knockdown in the second round, which would prove to be pivotal in the end, as Randall pulled a unanimous but close decision to recover the title.

== Post-championship career ==
The rest of his career, Coggi fought second level opposition, posting five wins in a row, three by knockout, before facing another well known fighter. In Coggi's last fight, contended on 29 May 1999, he lost a twelve-round unanimous decision to Michele Piccirillo in Italy.

== Retirement ==
Coggi is now a boxing trainer. His son, Martin Antonio Coggi, is a professional boxer.

Coggi was one of Raúl Alfonsín's favorite boxers: in a rare opportunity for a boxer, President Alfonsín invited Coggi to his presidential home after Coggi became world champion for the first time.

== Professional boxing record ==
82 fights	75 wins	5 losses
By knockout	44	0
By decision	31	5
Draws	2	

No.	Result	Record	Opponent	Type	Round, time	Date	Location	Notes
82	Loss	75–5–2	Michele Piccirillo	UD	12	1999-05-29	Bari, Italy	For WBU Welterweight title
81	Win	75–4–2	Dezi Ford	UD	10	1998-05-29	Las Vegas Hilton, Winchester, Nevada, U.S.	
80	Win	74–4–2	Silvio Rojas	PTS	8	1998-03-21	Club Acción, Presidencia Roque Sáenz Peña, Chaco, Argentina	
79	Win	73–4–2	Santiago Ahumada	RTD	1 (10)	1998-02-21	Estadio Polideportivo, Mar del Plata, Buenos Aires, Argentina	
78	Win	72–4–2	Agustin Gurrola	KO	4 (10)	1997-09-06	Centro de Educacion Física, Ranchos, Buenos Aires, Argentina	
77	Win	71–4–2	Alberto Zuluaga	KO	2 (10)	1996-12-14	Estudios Canal 9 TV, Buenos Aires, Argentina	
76	Loss	70–4–2	Frankie Randall	UD	12	1996-08-16	Sociedad Alemana de Gimnasia de Villa Ballester, Jose Leon Suarez, Argentina	Lost WBA Light Welterweight title
75	Win	70–3–2	Frankie Randall	TD	5 (12)	1996-01-13	Jai Alai Fronton, Miami, Florida, U.S.	Won WBA Light Welterweight title
74	Win	69–3–2	Hiroyuki Sakamoto	UD	10	1995-05-06	Korakuen Hall, Tokyo, Japan	
73	Win	68–3–2	Ildemar Jose Paisan	UD	10	1995-04-08	Estudios Canal 9 TV, Buenos Aires, Argentina	
72	Loss	67–3–2	Frankie Randall	UD	12	17 Sep 1994	MGM Grand Garden Arena, Las Vegas, Nevada, U.S.	Lost WBA Light Welterweight title
71	Win	67–2–2	Mario Morales	KO	3 (10)	1994-04-17	Estudios Canal 9 TV, Buenos Aires, Argentina	
70	Win	66–2–2	Eder Gonzalez	TKO	3 (12)	1994-03-18	MGM Grand Garden Arena, Las Vegas, Nevada, U.S.	Retained WBA Light Welterweight title
69	Win	65–2–2	Eder Gonzalez	TKO	7 (12)	1993-12-17	Club Defensores de Villa Luján, San Miguel, Tucumán, Argentina	Retained WBA Light Welterweight title
68	Win	64–2–2	Guillermo Cruz	TKO	10 (12)	1993-09-24	Club Defensores de Villa Luján, San Miguel, Tucumán, Argentina	Retained WBA Light Welterweight title
67	Win	63–2–2	Jose Rafael Barboza	UD	12	1993-08-13	Club Atlético Lanús, Lanús, Buenos Aires, Argentina	Retained WBA Light Welterweight title
66	Win	62–2–2	Hiroyuki Yoshino	TKO	5 (12)	1993-06-23	Korakuen Hall, Tokyo, Japan	Retained WBA Light Welterweight title
65	Win	61–2–2	José Antonio Rivera	TKO	7 (12)	1993-04-10	Estadio Super Domo, Mar del Plata, Buenos Aires, Argentina	Retained WBA Light Welterweight title
64	Win	60–2–2	Domingo Martínez	KO	3	1993-02-22	Estadio Super Domo, Mar del Plata, Buenos Aires, Argentina	
63	Win	59–2–2	Morris East	TKO	8 (12)	1993-01-12	Estadio Super Domo, Mar del Plata, Buenos Aires, Argentina	Won WBA Light Welterweight title
62	Win	58–2–2	Juan Alberto Contreras	KO	8 (10)	1992-09-11	Bella Vista, Buenos Aires, Argentina	
61	Win	57–2–2	Eduardo Jaquez	KO	6	1992-08-14	Buenos Aires, Argentina	
60	Win	56–2–2	Francisco Bobadilla	PTS	10	1992-05-02	Estudios Canal 9 TV, Buenos Aires, Argentina	
59	Win	55–2–2	Julián Rodriguez	KO	3 (10)	1992-04-03	La Plata, Buenos Aires, Argentina	
58	Win	54–2–2	Joseph Alexander	PTS	10	1991-11-17	Carpentras, France	
57	Win	53–2–2	Juan Alberto Contreras	KO	10	1991-09-06	Estudios Canal 9 TV, Buenos Aires, Argentina	
56	Win	52–2–2	Fernando Segura	KO	7	1991-07-27	Estudios Canal 9 TV, Buenos Aires, Argentina	
55	Win	51–2–2	Francisco Cuesta	PTS	10	1991-06-29	Estudios Canal 9 TV, Buenos Aires, Argentina	
54	Win	50–2–2	Ricardo Espinosa	KO	5 (10)	1991-04-13	San Salvador de Jujuy, Argentina	
53	Win	49–2–2	Dwayne Swift	PTS	8	1991-03-07	Palacio de Deportes, Madrid, Spain	
52	Win	48–2–2	Nestor Gil	PTS	10	1990-12-21	Cañuelas, Buenos Aires, Argentina	
51	Win	47–2–2	Alberto Alcaraz	TKO	7 (10)	1990-12-01	ARCO Arena, Sacramento, California, U.S.	
50	Win	46–2–2	Jorge Tejada	PTS	10	1990-11-10	Villa Dolores, Cordoba, Argentina	
49	Loss	45–2–2	Loreto Garza	MD	12	1990-04-23	Palais des Congrès Acropolis, Nice, France	Lost WBA Light Welterweight title
48	Win	45–1–2	Danilo Cabrera	KO	5	1990-04-23	Nogent-sur-Marne, France	
47	Win	44–1–2	José Luis Ramírez	UD	12	1990-03-24	Ajaccio, France	Retained WBA Light Welterweight title
46	Win	43–1–2	Jesse Williams	KO	4 (8)	1989-12-30	Amiens, France	
45	Win	42–1–2	Antonio Ojeda	PTS	10	1989-10-14	Concordia, Entre Rios, Argentina	
44	Win	41–1–2	Omar Alegre	TKO	9 (10)	1989-09-22	Córdoba, Argentina	
43	Win	40–1–2	Akinobu Hiranaka	UD	12	1989-04-29	Palazzo Dello Sport, Vasto, Italy	Retained WBA Light Welterweight title
42	Win	39–1–2	Raul Bianco	KO	2 (10)	1989-02-25	Villa Carlos Paz, Cordoba, Argentina	
41	Win	38–1–2	Harold Brazier	UD	12	1989-01-21	Palazzo Dello Sport, Vasto, Italy	Retained WBA Light Welterweight title
40	Win	37–1–2	Jorge Tejada	PTS	10	1988-12-02	Mar del Plata, Buenos Aires, Argentina	
39	Win	36–1–2	Jorge Tejada	PTS	10	1988-10-14	Guernica, Buenos Aires, Argentina	
38	Win	35–1–2	Osvaldo Maldonado	KO	6 (10)	1988-08-12	Trelew, Chubut, Argentina	
37	Win	34–1–2	Lee Sang-Ho	KO	2 (12)	1988-05-07	Roseto degli Abruzzi, Italy	Retained WBA Light Welterweight title
36	Win	33–1–2	Mario Araya	KO	6 (10)	1988-02-19	Catamarca, Argentina	
35	Win	32–1–2	Patrizio Oliva	KO	3 (15)	1987-07-04	Palazzo Dello Sport, Ribera, Italy	Won WBA Light Welterweight title
34	Win	31–1–2	José Magarino	KO	5 (10)	1987-04-04	General Roca, Rio Negro, Argentina	
33	Win	30–1–2	Hugo Hernandez	KO	3 (12)	1986-10-25	Estadio Luna Park, Buenos Aires, Argentina	Won Argentina Light Welterweight Title
32	Draw	29–1–2	Ramon Collado	PTS	10	1986-07-19	La Plata, Buenos Aires, Argentina	
31	Win	29–1–1	Jose Luis Saldivia	KO	2 (10)	1986-06-14	Santa Maria, Cordoba, Argentina	
30	Win	28–1–1	Edecio Molina Ortiz	PTS	10	1986-04-05	Estadio Luna Park, Buenos Aires, Argentina	
29	Win	27–1–1	Sergio Brites	KO	5 (10)	1986-03-07	Mar del Plata, Buenos Aires, Argentina	
28	Win	26–1–1	Ruben Verdun	TD	7 (10)	1985-10-26	Rojas, Buenos Aires, Argentina	
27	Win	25–1–1	Oscar Sosa	RTD	7 (10)	1985-08-31	Rojas, Buenos Aires, Argentina	
26	Win	24–1–1	Miguel Angel Pereyra	TKO	8 (10)	1985-08-03	Estadio Luna Park, Buenos Aires, Argentina	
25	Draw	23–1–1	Ramon Collado	PTS	10	1985-06-20	Las Flores, Buenos Aires, Argentina	
24	Win	23–1	Ramon Jara	TKO	7 (10)	1985-05-11	Estadio Luna Park, Buenos Aires, Argentina	
23	Loss	22–1	Adolfo Omar Arce Rossi	PTS	10	1985-03-09	Estadio Luna Park, Buenos Aires, Argentina	
22	Win	22–0	Miguel Angel Pereyra	PTS	10	1985-02-22	Mar del Plata, Buenos Aires, Argentina	
21	Win	21–0	Marcelo Villagra	PTS	10	1984-11-11	San Juan, Argentina	
20	Win	20–0	Ramon Collado	PTS	10	1984-09-01	Estadio Luna Park, Buenos Aires, Argentina	
19	Win	19–0	Pedro Gutierrez	KO	1 (10)	1984-08-10	La Plata, Buenos Aires, Argentina	
18	Win	18–0	Ricardo Espinosa	TKO	2 (10)	1984-06-23	Estadio Luna Park, Buenos Aires, Argentina	
17	Win	17–0	Ricardo Espinosa	PTS	10	1984-03-09	Mar del Plata, Buenos Aires, Argentina	
16	Win	16–0	Marcelo Villagra	PTS	10	1984-02-10	Las Flores, Buenos Aires, Argentina	
15	Win	15–0	Romulo Ibarra	PTS	10	1983-12-23	Brandsen, Buenos Aires, Argentina	
14	Win	14–0	Anibal Ozuna	KO	2 (10)	1983-12-07	Estadio Luna Park, Buenos Aires, Argentina	
13	Win	13–0	Apolinario Romero	PTS	10	1983-11-09	Estadio Luna Park, Buenos Aires, Argentina	
12	Win	12–0	Anibal Ozuna	PTS	10	1983-10-14	La Plata, Buenos Aires, Argentina	
11	Win	11–0	Sergio Brites	KO	2 (10)	1983-06-15	Estadio Luna Park, Buenos Aires, Argentina	
10	Win	10–0	Apolinario Romero	PTS	10	1983-05-18	Estadio Luna Park, Buenos Aires, Argentina	
9	Win	9–0	Carlos Fallone	KO	7 (10)	1983-04-08	José C. Paz, Buenos Aires, Argentina	
8	Win	8–0	Osvaldo Colros	KO	1 (10)	1983-02-11	Brandsen, Buenos Aires, Argentina	
7	Win	7–0	Norberto Ramirez	PTS	8	1982-12-10	Brandsen, Buenos Aires, Argentina	
6	Win	6–0	Carlos Fallone	KO	7 (8)	1982-11-12	Brandsen, Buenos Aires, Argentina	
5	Win	5–0	Rogelio Florentin	KO	2 (6)	1982-10-27	Brandsen, Buenos Aires, Argentina	
4	Win	4–0	Felipe Baez	TKO	4 (10)	1982-09-10	Brandsen, Buenos Aires, Argentina	
3	Win	3–0	Raul Gramasco	KO	2 (6)	1982-06-11	Brandsen, Buenos Aires, Argentina	
2	Win	2–0	Viterman Sanchez	PTS	6	1982-05-07	La Plata, Buenos Aires, Argentina	
1	Win	1–0	Horacio Valdez	KO	4 (6)	1982-04-02	La Plata, Buenos Aires, Argentina	

== See also ==
- List of world light-welterweight boxing champions

Sporting positions
Regional boxing titles
Preceded by Hugo Ariel Hernandez	Argentina Light Welterweight Champion; 25 October 1986 – 4 July 1987; Vacated	Vacant Title next held by Hugo Ariel Hernandez
World boxing titles
Preceded by Patrizio Oliva	WBA light welterweight champion 4 July 1987 – 17 August 1990	Succeeded by Loreto Garza
Preceded by Morris East	WBA light welterweight champion 12 January 1993 – 17 September 1994	Succeeded by Frankie Randall
Preceded by Frankie Randall	WBA light welterweight champion 13 January 1996 – 16 August 1996	Succeeded by Frankie Randall
