= Julian Jackson (boxer) =

Virgin Islands boxer (born 1960)

Personal information
- Nickname: The Hawk
- Born: September 12, 1960 (age 65) Saint Thomas, U.S. Virgin Islands
- Height: 5 ft 11 in (180 cm)
- Weight: Light middleweight; Middleweight

Boxing career
- Reach: 73 in (185 cm)
- Stance: Orthodox

Boxing record
- Total fights: 61
- Wins: 55
- Win by KO: 49
- Losses: 6

Julian Jackson (born September 12, 1960) is a former professional boxer from the U.S. Virgin Islands who competed from 1981 to 1998. He is a three-time world champion in two weight classes, having held the World Boxing Association (WBA) super welterweight title from 1987 to 1990, and the World Boxing Council (WBC) middleweight title twice between 1990 and 1995. Possessing formidable punching power, with a knockout-to-win rate of 89%, Jackson is regarded by many as one of the hardest punchers in boxing history, pound for pound, and was ranked number 25 by The Ring magazine in a 2003 list of the "100 Greatest Punchers". Jackson was elected to the International Boxing Hall of Fame in 2019.

== Amateur career ==
Jackson represented the United States Virgin Islands at the 1979 Pan American Games, losing his first fight to Jose Baret of the Dominican Republic.

Jackson reportedly completed his amateur career with a record of 15 wins, 2 losses.

== Professional career ==
Jackson turned professional in February 1981 and had many of his early fights in Puerto Rico, where he lived for a short time, and gained a shot at WBA super welterweight champion Mike McCallum in August 1986. Jackson hurt the champion on a couple occasions in the first round, but McCallum came storming back with a barrage that forced the referee to stop matters in the second round.

=== Light middleweight Champion ===
After McCallum moved up to middleweight, Jackson got his second shot at the now-vacant WBA title in November 1987 against Korean Baek In-chul, winning in three rounds. Baek would go on to win the WBA super-middleweight title a year later. Jackson made three defenses of his crown, against former IBF title-holder Buster Drayton (TKO 3), Francisco DeJesus (KO 8), and future three-time champion Terry Norris (TKO 2). All these defenses were won with a single knockout punch.

=== First middleweight title reign ===
Jackson then vacated his crown, moved up to 160 lb (73 kg), and was matched against Herol 'Bomber' Graham for the vacant WBC middleweight title. Due to Jackson's recent retina damage which had required surgery, the British Boxing Board of Control felt that Jackson was returning to boxing too soon and didn't allow him to box in the UK, so the bout was held at Torrequebrada Hotel & Casino, Benalmádena, Andalucía, Spain on 24 November 1990.

Graham was putting on his typical savvy performance against Jackson: countering, slipping, and dancing out of the way, targeting Jackson's vulnerable eye which started to swell. After being consistently beaten to the punch for three and a half rounds, Jackson then unleashed one of the great right hands in boxing history. After Jackson connected with the punch, Graham was unconscious before he hit the canvas, and was revived only after five alarming minutes.

Defenses against Dennis Milton (KO 1), Ismael Negron (KO 1), and Ron Collins (TKO 5) ended quickly, but Thomas Tate would make Jackson work longer and harder in their August 1992 encounter – Julian had to go to the scorecards for the first time in a title bout in winning a 12-round unanimous decision, scoring a knockdown along the way. At this point Jackson was in the middle of the pound-for-pound rankings.

This would lead to his showdown in May 1993 with another big hitter, Gerald McClellan. This time the challenger prevailed, as Jackson failed to find the knockout blow when hitting McClellan with hard punches and controlling Rounds 2 and 3, with McClellan turning the fight around and knocking Jackson down twice in the fifth round. The second knockdown prompted the referee to stop the fight, after Jackson made it to his feet yet remained unsteady.

After winning his next three fights, Jackson had another shot at the title in May 1994 in a rematch with McClellan. In a very brief fight, Jackson hit McClellan with some hard punches, but Jackson was then hurt himself and put under heavy pressure by McClellan, with McClellan flooring Jackson with a left hook to the body after 65 seconds. The referee counted Jackson out as he rose to his feet.

=== Second middleweight title reign ===
After McClellan vacated the title to move up to super-middleweight, Jackson would have a second but brief reign as WBC middleweight champion, beating the previously undefeated European champion Agostino Cardamone in March 1995. Jackson had a shaky end to the first round, during which he was hurt and put under pressure until the bell by Cardamone, who wasn't considered a hard puncher. In round two however, Jackson again showed his punching power by suddenly dropping Cardamone heavily with a short right hand. Cardamone managed to make it to his feet but remained badly shaken, forcing the referee to stop the fight.

Jackson lost the title in his first defense against Quincy Taylor in August 1995, by a sixth round stoppage. During the fight with Taylor, Jackson tore his rotator cuff and looked a shadow of his former self.

=== Post title ===
Jackson would have four more low-key victories, before ending his career with losses to Verno Phillips and Anthony Jones, both in nine rounds, in 1998.

He was inducted into the Atlantic City Boxing Hall of Fame in 2025.

== Life after boxing ==
After retiring from the sport, Jackson joined the ministry and still lives in his birthplace of St. Thomas, Virgin Islands. He has continued his involvement in the local boxing field as a trainer and coach, and his three sons, Julius Jackson, Julian Jackson Jr. and John Jackson, have all competed professionally since 2009.

Jackson was once hired by Coral World Ocean Park in St. Thomas as a way to attract visitors to the park.

== Professional boxing record ==
61 fights	55 wins	6 losses
By knockout	49	6
By decision	6	0

No.	Result	Record	Opponent	Type	Round, time	Date	Location	Notes
61	Loss	55–6	Anthony Jones	TKO	9 (10), 1:31	May 24, 1998	The Palace, Auburn Hills, Michigan, U.S.	
60	Loss	55–5	Verno Phillips	KO	9 (12), 2:01	Jan 23, 1998	Grand Casino Tunica, Robinsonville, Mississippi, U.S.	For WBU super welterweight title
59	Win	55–4	Eduardo Gutiérrez	TKO	3 (10), 0:36	Oct 31, 1997	Packard Music Hall, Warren, Ohio, U.S.	
58	Win	54–4	Terry Ford	TKO	2 (10), 1:01	Jul 25, 1997	Tropicana Las Vegas, Paradise, Nevada, U.S.	
57	Win	53–4	Augustine Renteria	UD	10	Dec 7, 1996	Fantasy Springs Resort Casino, Indio, California, U.S.	
56	Win	52–4	Leonardo Aguilar	UD	10	Sep 9, 1996	Great Western Forum, Inglewood, California, U.S.	
55	Loss	51–4	Quincy Taylor	TKO	6 (12), 2:33	Aug 19, 1995	MGM Grand Garden Arena, Paradise, Nevada, U.S.	Lost WBC middleweight title
54	Win	51–3	Agostino Cardamone	TKO	2 (12), 1:50	Mar 17, 1995	Memorial Auditorium, Worcester, Massachusetts, U.S.	Won vacant WBC middleweight title
53	Win	50–3	Luis Buitron	TKO	3 (10)	Dec 17, 1994	Coliseo General Rumiñahui, Quito, Ecuador	
52	Loss	49–3	Gerald McClellan	KO	1 (12), 1:23	May 7, 1994	MGM Grand Garden Arena, Paradise, Nevada, U.S.	For WBC middleweight title
51	Win	49–2	Eduardo Ayala	UD	10	Mar 4, 1994	MGM Grand Garden Arena, Paradise, Nevada, U.S.	
50	Win	48–2	Jaime Montano	TKO	1 (10), 1:50	Dec 15, 1993	The Aladdin, Paradise, Nevada, U.S.	
49	Win	47–2	Carlton Haywood	TKO	1 (10), 2:16	Aug 6, 1993	Coliseo Rubén Rodríguez, Bayamón, Puerto Rico	
48	Loss	46–2	Gerald McClellan	TKO	5 (12), 2:09	May 8, 1993	Thomas & Mack Center, Paradise, Nevada, U.S.	Lost WBC middleweight title
47	Win	46–1	Eddie Hall	TKO	4 (10)	Dec 13, 1992	The Mirage, Paradise, Nevada, U.S.	
46	Win	45–1	Thomas Tate	UD	12	Aug 1, 1992	Las Vegas Hilton, Winchester, Nevada, U.S.	Retained WBC middleweight title
45	Win	44–1	Ron Collins	TKO	5 (12), 1:27	Apr 10, 1992	Toreo de Cuatro Caminos, Mexico City, Mexico	Retained WBC middleweight title
44	Win	43–1	Ismael Negron	TKO	1 (12), 0:50	Feb 15, 1992	The Mirage, Paradise, Nevada, U.S.	Retained WBC middleweight title
43	Win	42–1	Dennis Milton	KO	1 (12), 2:10	Sep 14, 1991	The Mirage, Paradise, Nevada, U.S.	Retained WBC middleweight title
42	Win	41–1	Herol Graham	KO	4 (12), 1:13	Nov 24, 1990	Torrequebrada Hotel & Casino, Benalmádena, Spain	Won vacant WBC middleweight title
41	Win	40–1	Wayne Powell	TKO	4 (10), 1:36	Jun 16, 1990	Caesars Palace, Paradise, Nevada, U.S.	
40	Win	39–1	John McClendon	KO	2 (10)	May 18, 1990	Saint Thomas, U.S. Virgin Islands	
39	Win	38–1	Terry Norris	TKO	2 (12), 1:33	Jul 30, 1989	Convention Hall, Atlantic City, New Jersey, U.S.	Retained WBA super welterweight title
38	Win	37–1	Derwin Richards	TKO	6 (10), 1:33	May 13, 1989	Great Western Forum, Inglewood, California, U.S.	
37	Win	36–1	Francisco de Jesus	KO	8 (12), 2:19	Feb 25, 1989	Las Vegas Hilton, Winchester, Nevada, U.S.	Retained WBA super welterweight title
36	Win	35–1	Buster Drayton	TKO	3 (12), 2:57	Jul 30, 1988	Broadway by the Bay Theater, Atlantic City, New Jersey, U.S.	Retained WBA super welterweight title
35	Win	34–1	Efren Olivo	TKO	1 (10)	Jun 25, 1988	Trump Plaza Hotel and Casino, Atlantic City, New Jersey, U.S.	
34	Win	33–1	Reggie Barnes	TKO	1 (10)	Apr 16, 1988	Las Vegas Hilton, Winchester, Nevada, U.S.	
33	Win	32–1	Baek In-chul	TKO	3 (12), 1:17	Nov 21, 1987	Las Vegas Hilton, Winchester, Nevada, U.S.	Won vacant WBA super welterweight title
32	Win	31–1	Milton Leaks	TKO	10 (12), 0:38	Apr 24, 1987	Civic Center, Hartford, Connecticut, U.S.	Retained WBC Continental Americas super welterweight title
31	Win	30–1	Khalif Shabazz	KO	1 (10)	Dec 19, 1986	Saint Thomas, U.S. Virgin Islands	
30	Loss	29–1	Mike McCallum	TKO	2 (15), 2:03	Aug 23, 1986	Convention Hall, Miami Beach, Florida, U.S.	For WBA super welterweight title
29	Win	29–0	Derrick Drane	TKO	2 (10), 2:16	May 20, 1986	Madison Square Garden, New York City, New York, U.S.	
28	Win	28–0	Francisco Del Toro	KO	2 (10), 2:05	Apr 19, 1986	Las Vegas Hilton, Winchester, Nevada, U.S.	
27	Win	27–0	Mark Allman	TKO	1 (10)	Mar 22, 1986	Riviera Hotel & Casino, Winchester, Nevada, U.S.	
26	Win	26–0	Lopez McGee	KO	4 (12)	Feb 28, 1986	Saint Thomas, U.S. Virgin Islands	Retained WBC Continental Americas super welterweight title
25	Win	25–0	Raúl Hernandez	TKO	1 (10)	Nov 15, 1985	Tamiami Fairgrounds Auditorium, Miami, Florida, U.S.	
24	Win	24–0	José Padilla	TKO	3 (10), 1:22	Aug 10, 1985	Riviera Hotel & Casino, Winchester, Nevada, U.S.	
23	Win	23–0	Rafael Corona	KO	3 (12)	Jul 12, 1985	Marriott Hotel, Santa Clara, California, U.S.	Retained WBC Continental Americas super welterweight title
22	Win	22–0	Tim Harris	TKO	8 (12), 0:18	Nov 21, 1984	Riviera Hotel & Casino, Winchester, Nevada, U.S.	Retained WBC Continental Americas super welterweight title
21	Win	21–0	Santos Solis	TKO	2 (10), 2:14	Nov 3, 1984	Hiram Bithorn Stadium, San Juan, Puerto Rico	
20	Win	20–0	Curtis Ramsey	TKO	12 (12), 0:43	Aug 15, 1984	Riviera, Winchester, Nevada, U.S.	Retained WBC Continental Americas super welterweight title
19	Win	19–0	Ron Lee Warrior	TKO	3 (12), 2:35	Jan 20, 1984	Roberto Clemente Coliseum, San Juan, Puerto Rico	Won WBC Continental Americas super welterweight title
18	Win	18–0	JJ Cottrell	TKO	5 (10), 2:57	May 16, 1984	Showboat Hotel and Casino, Las Vegas, Nevada, U.S.	
17	Win	17–0	Eddie Gazo	KO	2 (10), 0:36	Mar 17, 1984	Hiram Bithorn Stadium, San Juan, Puerto Rico	
16	Win	16–0	Carlton Brown	TKO	1 (10)	Jan 20, 1984	Felt Forum, New York City, New York, U.S.	
15	Win	15–0	Jeff Nelson	TKO	3 (10), 2:31	Oct 15, 1983	Knight International Center, Miami, Florida, U.S.	
14	Win	14–0	David Plowden	KO	3 (10)	Jun 25, 1983	Roberto Clemente Coliseum, San Juan, Puerto Rico	
13	Win	13–0	Reinaldo Roque	TKO	1 (10), 2:46	May 18, 1983	Dunes, Paradise, Nevada, U.S.	
12	Win	12–0	Jake Torrance	TKO	5 (10)	Mar 6, 1983	Broadway by the Bay Theater, Atlantic City, New Jersey, U.S.	
11	Win	11–0	Dominic Fox	KO	2 (10), 2:19	Feb 19, 1983	Hato Rey, Puerto Rico	
10	Win	10–0	Mack Heimbaugh	TKO	4 (8)	Nov 17, 1982	Civic Arena, St. Joseph, Missouri, U.S.	
9	Win	9–0	Miguel Sepulveda	TKO	3 (8), 0:24	Aug 18, 1982	Hiram Bithorn Stadium, San Juan, Puerto Rico	
8	Win	8–0	Al Cook	KO	2 (8), 2:15	Jun 8, 1982	Convention Hall, Miami Beach, Florida, U.S.	
7	Win	7–0	William Page	UD	6	Mar 20, 1982	Playboy Hotel and Casino, Atlantic City, New Jersey, U.S.	
6	Win	6–0	Dario De Asa	KO	3 (8)	Sep 26, 1981	Convention Center, Miami Beach, Florida, U.S.	
5	Win	5–0	Edwin Rodriguez	KO	1 (6)	Aug 15, 1981	San Juan, Puerto Rico	
4	Win	4–0	Reyes Escalera	TKO	3 (6)	May 15, 1981	Saint Thomas, U.S. Virgin Islands	
3	Win	3–0	Marcelino Flores	KO	2 (4)	May 9, 1981	San Juan, Puerto Rico	
2	Win	2–0	Rafael Ayala	KO	1 (4)	Mar 5, 1981	Trujillo Alto, Puerto Rico	
1	Win	1–0	Inocencio Carmona	PTS	4	Feb 2, 1981	San Juan, Puerto Rico	

Sporting positions
Regional boxing titles
Vacant Title last held by Carlos Maria del Valle Herrera	WBC Continental Americas super welterweight champion June 20, 1984 – April 1987; Vacated	Vacant Title next held by Billy Bridges
World boxing titles
Vacant Title last held by Mike McCallum	WBA super welterweight champion November 21, 1987 – January 10, 1991; Vacated	Vacant Title next held by Gilbert Delé
Vacant Title last held by Roberto Durán	WBC middleweight champion November 24, 1990 – May 8, 1993	Succeeded by Gerald McClellan
Vacant Title last held by Gerald McClellan	WBC middleweight champion March 17, 1995 – August 19, 1995	Succeeded by Quincy Taylor
