= T.League =

Table tennis league in Japan

The T.League (Japanese: Tリーグ; Romaji: T.Rīgu) or Nojima T.League (Japanese: ノジマTリーグ) is the premier table tennis league of Japan which began in 2018. It is the first professional table tennis league in Japan. There are twelve teams, six each for men and women.

== Teams ==
=== Men's teams ===
Name	Japanese name	Prefecture	Head coach
T.T Saitama	T.T彩たま	Saitama	(Japan) Yuya Mizuno (水野裕哉)
Kinoshita Meister Tokyo	木下マイスター東京	Tokyo	(Japan) Wang Kai (王凱)
Kanazawa Port	金沢ポート	Kanazawa	(Japan) Akira Saito (西東輝)
Shizuoka Jade	静岡ジェード	Shizuoka	(Japan) Masataka Morizono (森薗政崇)
Okayama Rivets	岡山リベッツ	Okayama	(Japan) Kōsuke Shiraga (白神宏佑)
Ryukyu Asteeda	琉球アスティーダ	Okinawa	(Japan) Kazuhiro Chang (張一博)

=== Women's teams ===
Name	Japanese name	Prefecture	Head coach
Kinoshita Abyell Kanagawa	木下アビエル神奈川	Kanagawa	(Japan) Rui Nakazawa (中澤鋭)
Top Otome Pingpongs Nagoya	トップおとめピンポンズ名古屋	Aichi	(Japan) Misako Wakamiya (若宮三紗子)
Nissay Red Elf	日本生命レッドエルフ	Osaka	(Japan) Yasukazu Murakami (村上恭和)
Nippon Paint Mallets	日本ペイントマレッツ	Osaka	(Japan) Yumi Oshima (大嶋由美)
Kyushu Asteeda	九州アスティーダ	Fukuoka	(Japan) Hidefumi Masuda (増田秀文)
Kyoto Kaguyalyze	京都カグヤライズ	Kyoto	(Japan) Shuhei Kobayashi (小林修平)

== Stadiums ==
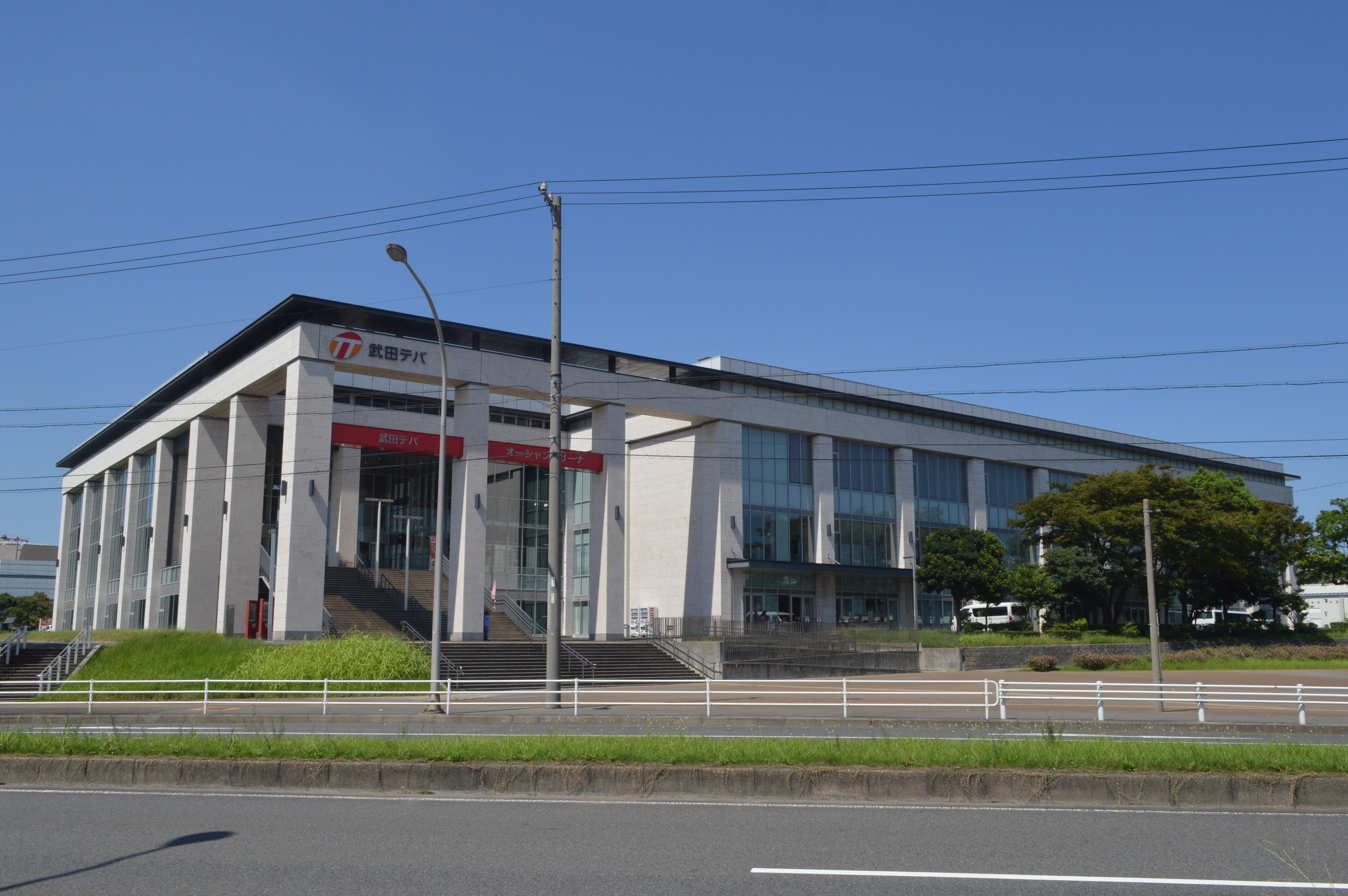
Takeda Teva Ocean Arena in Nagoya, Aichi

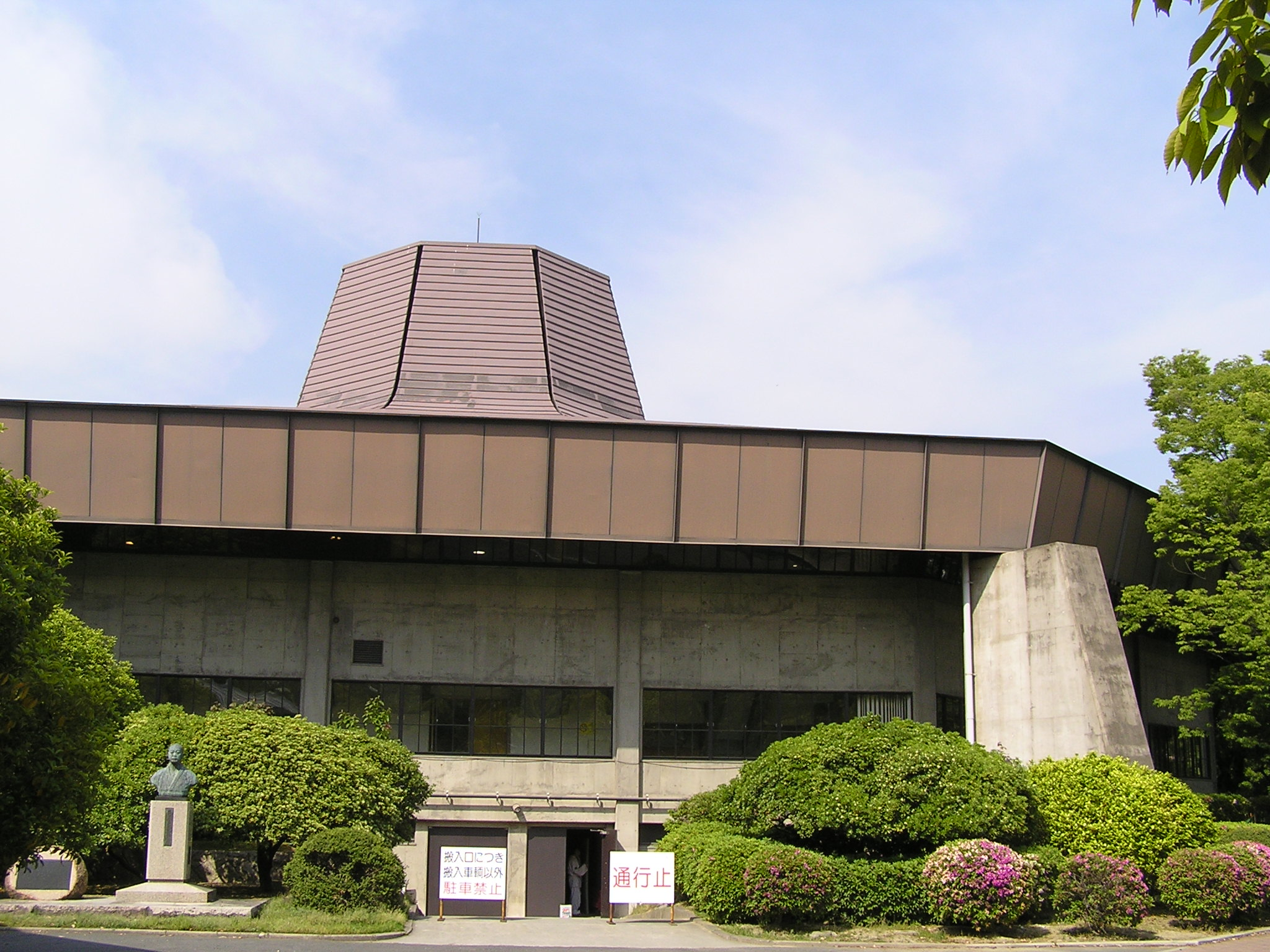
Okayama Budokan in Okayama

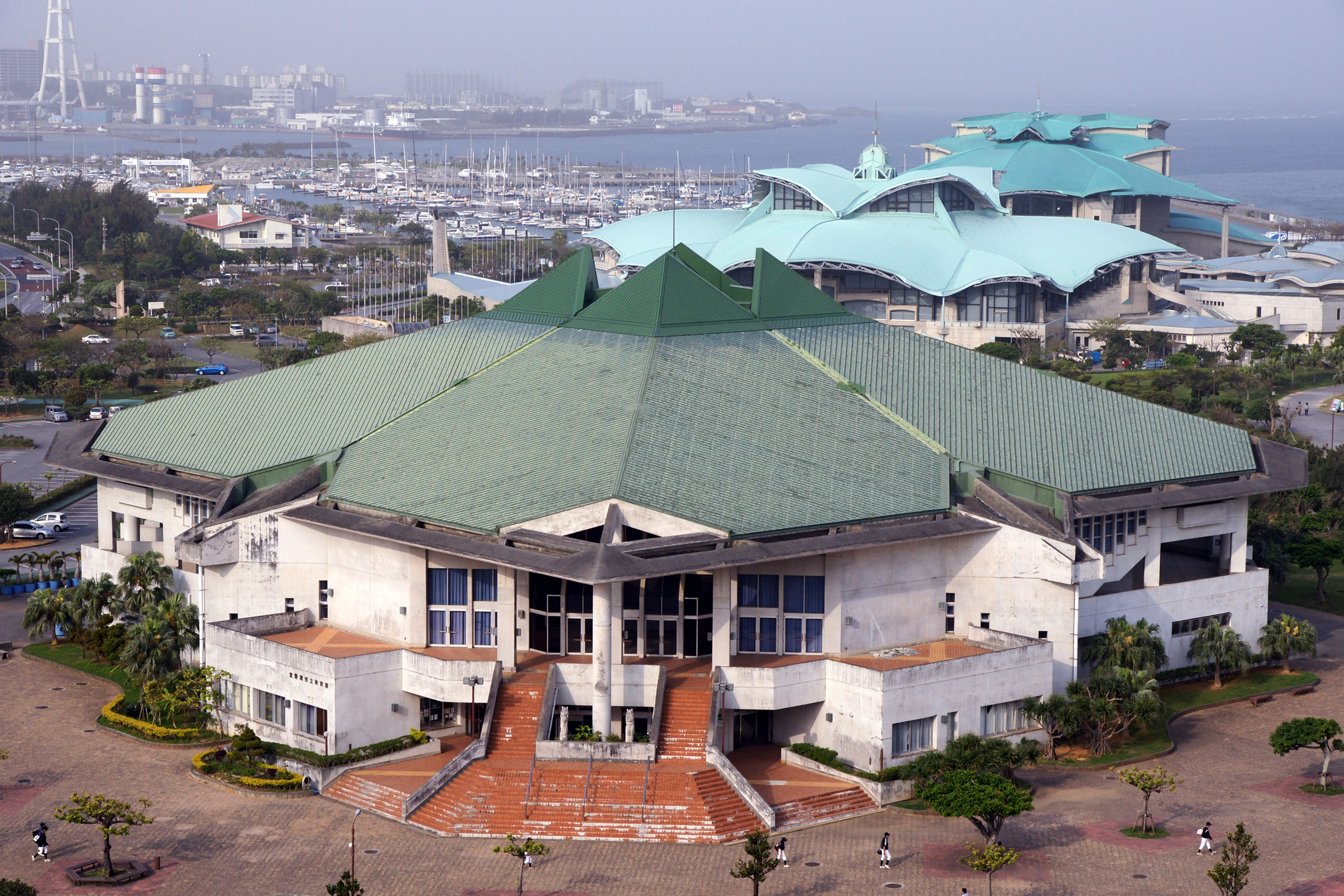
Ginowan City Gymnasium in Ginowan, Okinawa

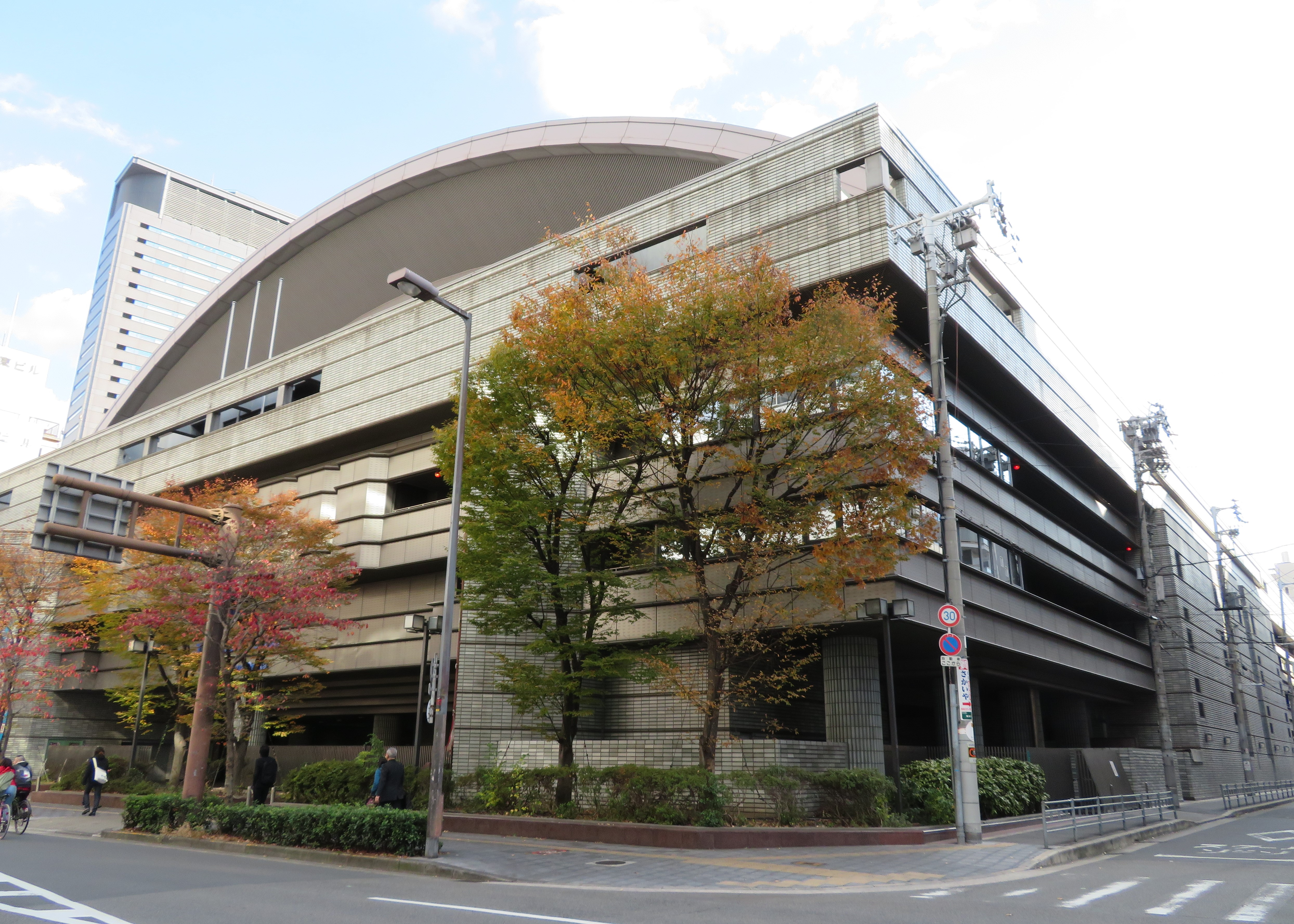
Osaka Prefectural Gymnasium in Namba, Osaka

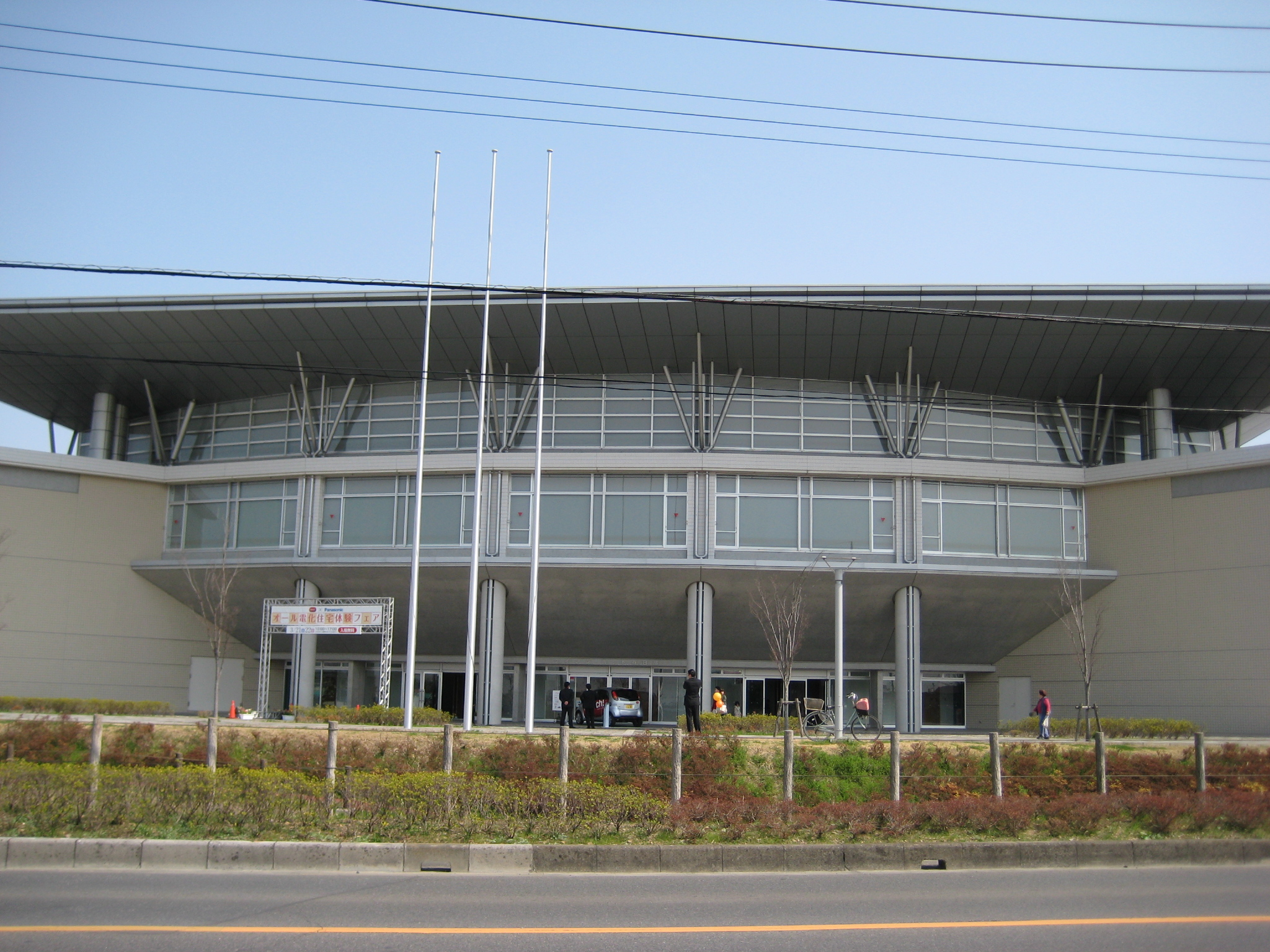
Wing Hat Kasukabe in Kasukabe, Saitama

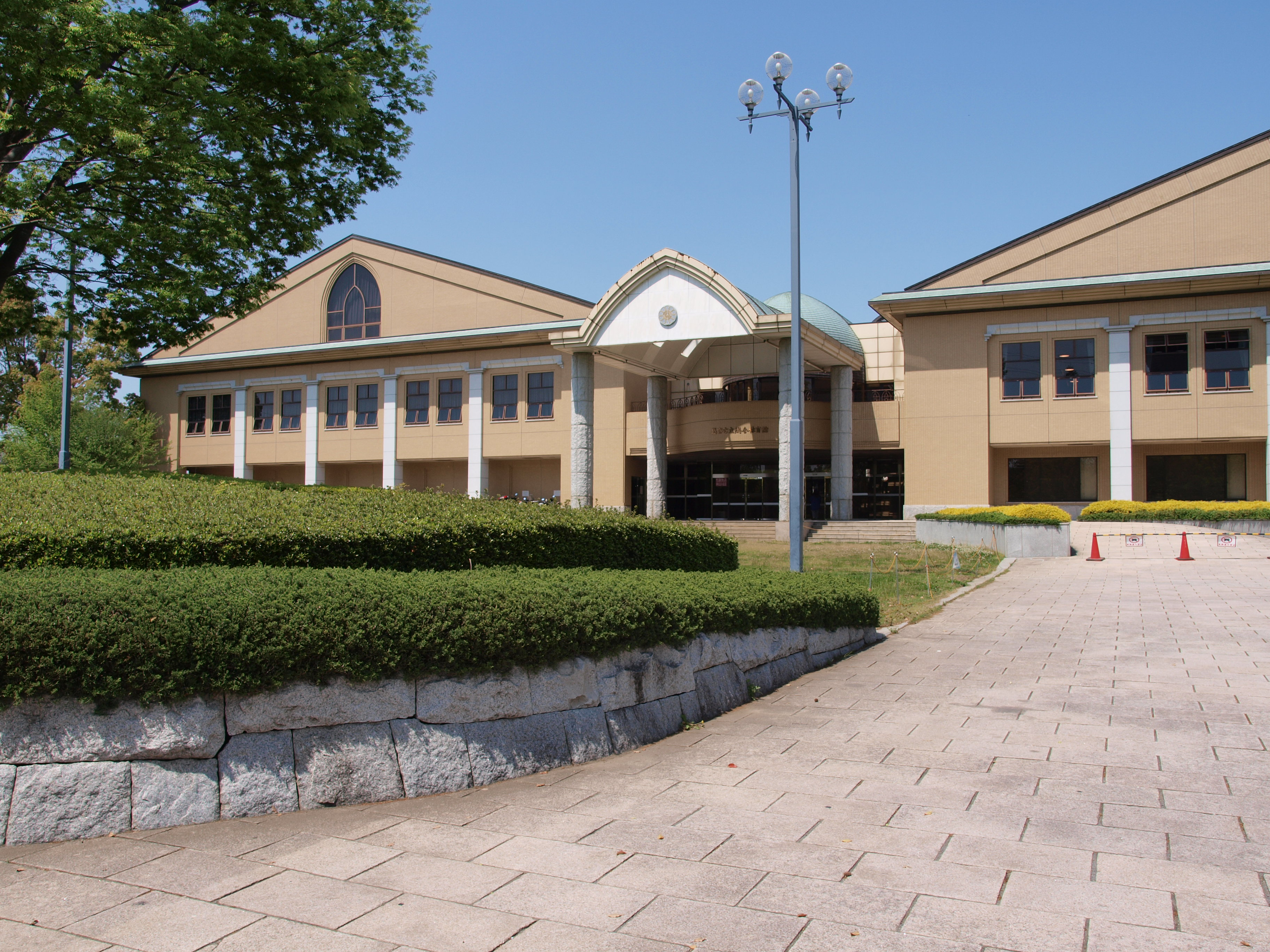
Koshigaya Municipal General Gymnasium in Koshigaya, Saitama

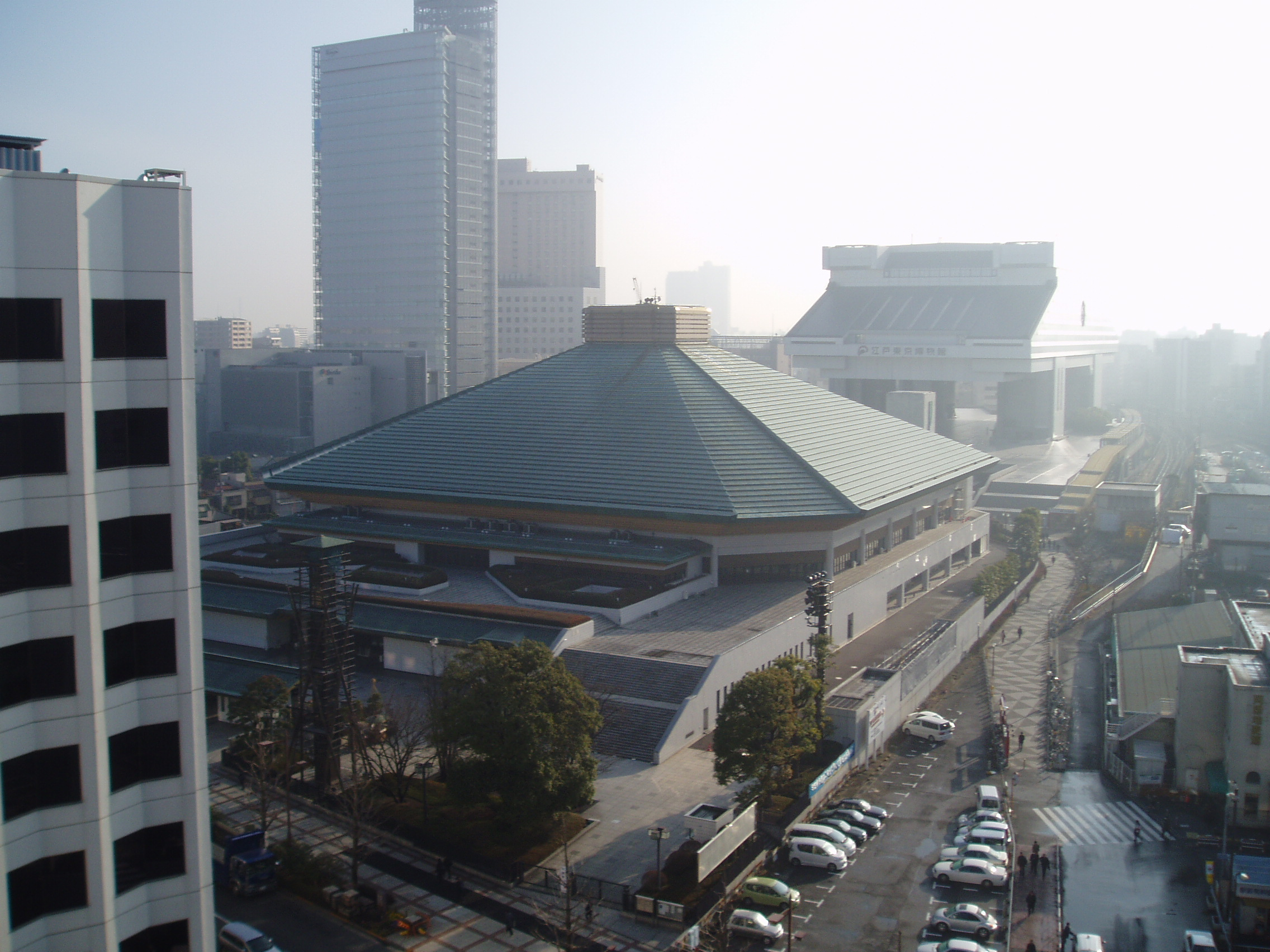
Ryōgoku Kokugikan in Sumida, Tokyo

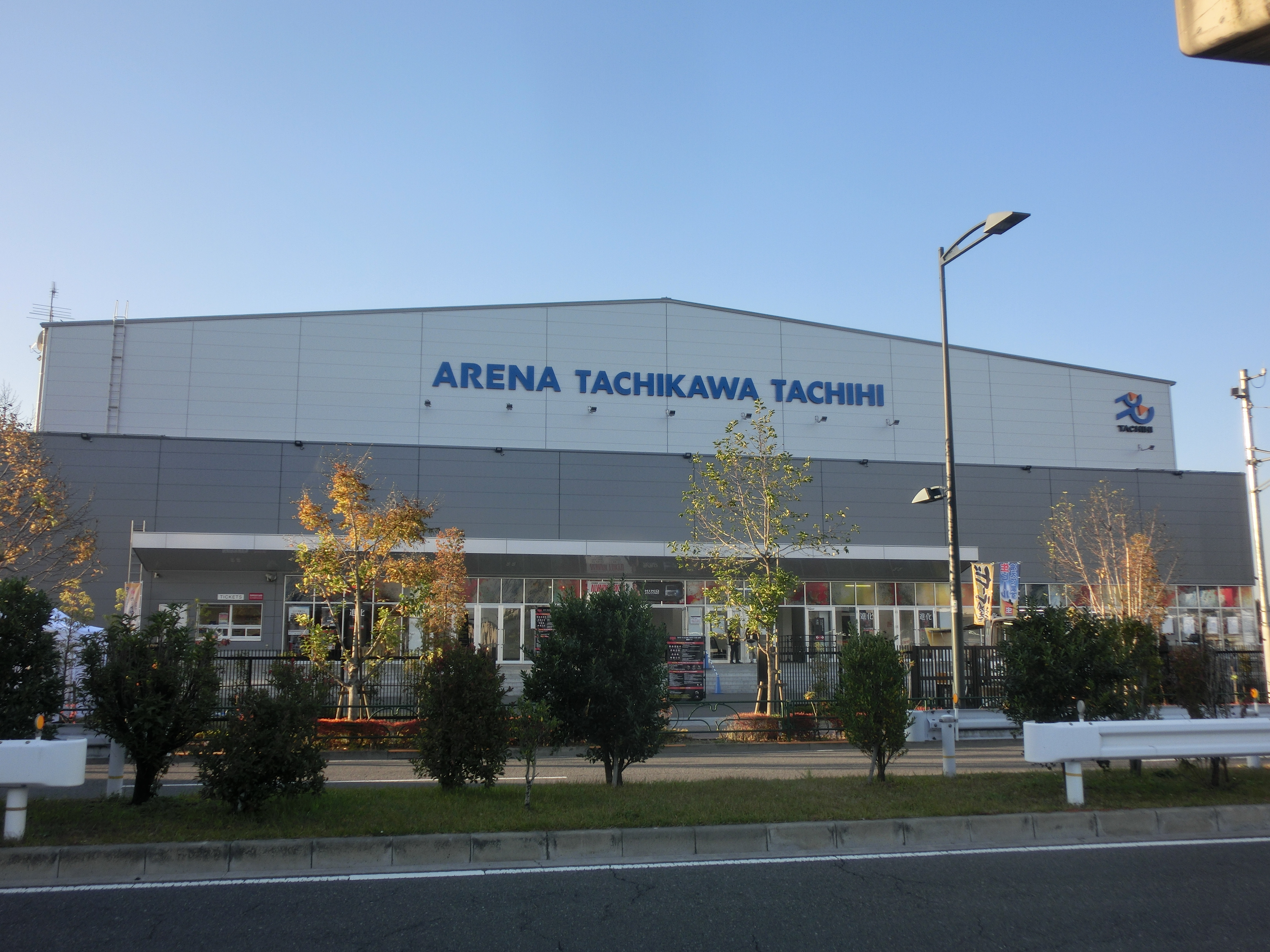
Arena Tachikawa Tachihi in Tachikawa, Tokyo

== Format and rules ==
Each team match features one doubles match and at least three singles matches. If the score after four matches is 2–2, an extra-time, single-game "victory match" will determine the winner. T.League rules differ from international table tennis rules.

Match 1	Doubles	Best of 3	Score starts at 6–6 for the final game Play to 11 points only (i.e. 11–10 wins) for non-final games
Match 2	Singles	Best of 5	Score starts at 6–6 for the final game Play to 11 points only (i.e. 11–10 wins) for non-final games
Match 3	Singles	Best of 5	Score starts at 6–6 for the final game Play to 11 points only (i.e. 11–10 wins) for non-final games
Match 4	Singles	Best of 5	Score starts at 6–6 for the final game Play to 11 points only (i.e. 11–10 wins) for non-final games
"Victory match"	Singles	1 game	

Match 1 players may not play in Match 2. Matches 2, 3, and 4 must feature different players for both teams.

== Results ==
=== Men's division ===
Season	Winner	Runner-up	MVP	Best doubles pair
2018–19	Tokyo (14W–7L)	Okayama (12W–9L)	Season & 2nd half: (Japan) Jun Mizutani (Tokyo); 1st half: (Japan) Tomokazu Harimoto (Tokyo)	(Japan) Masataka Morizono (Japan) Jin Ueda (Okayama)
2019–20	Tokyo (15W–6L)	Ryukyu (11W–10L)	Season & 1st half: (China) Hou Yingchao (Tokyo); 2nd half: (Japan) Takuya Jin (Saitama)	(Japan) Kenta Tazoe (Japan) Yukiya Uda (Tokyo)
2020–21	Ryukyu (15W–6L)	Tokyo (13W–8L)	Season: (Japan) Maharu Yoshimura (Ryukyu)	(Japan) Kakeru Sone (Japan) Hiroto Shinozuka (TT Ayatama)
2021–22	Tokyo (15W–6L)	T.T Saitama (10W–11L)	Season & 1st half: (Japan) Mizuki Oikawa (Tokyo); 2nd half: (Japan) Kakeru Sone (TT Ayatama)	(Japan) Taimu Arinobu (Japan) Yukiya Uda (Ryukyu)
2022–23	Ryukyu (12W–9L)	Tokyo (13W–8L)		
2023–24	Tokyo (15W–5L)	Okayama (10W–10L)	Season: (Taiwan) Lin Yun-ju (Tokyo)	(Japan) Masataka Morizono (Japan) Tonin Ryuzaki (Shizuoka)
2024–25	TT Ayatama (16W–9L)	Ryukyu (16W–9L)		

=== Women's division ===
Season	Winner	Runner-up	MVP	Best doubles pair
2018–19	Nissay (18W–3L)	Kanagawa (13W–8L)	Season & 1st half: (Japan) Hina Hayata (Nissay); 2nd half: (Japan) Kasumi Ishikawa (Kanagawa)	(China) Chang Chenchen (China) Jiang Hui (Nissay)
2019–20	Nissay (14W–7L)	Kanagawa (13W–8L)	Season & 2nd half: (Japan) Sakura Mori (Nissay); 1st half: (Thailand) Suthasini Sawettabut (Nippon Paint)	(South Korea) Yang Ha-eun (Japan) Rika Suzuki (Nagoya)
2020–21	Nissay (13W–8L)	Kanagawa (17W–4L)	Season: (Japan) Hina Hayata (Nissay)	(Japan) Miyu Nagasaki (Japan) Yui Hamamoto (Kanagawa)
2021–22	Nissay (16W–4L)	Nippon Paint (14W–6L)	Season & 1st half: (Japan) Honoka Hashimoto (Kyushu); 2nd half: (Japan) Sakura Mori (Nissay)	(Japan) Hitomi Sato (Japan) Honoka Hashimoto (Kyushu)
2022–23	Kanagawa (15W–5L)	Nissay (11W–9L)		
2023–24	Nissay (15W–5L)	Kanagawa (16W–4L)	Season: (Japan) Miwa Harimoto (Kanagawa)	(Japan) Kasumi Kimura (Japan) Yurika Namba (Nagoya)
2024–25	Kanagawa (19W–6L)	Nippon Paint (21W–4L)		

== Official site ==
- Official website (in Japanese)
