= Lennox Lewis vs. Donovan Ruddock =

Boxing match

The Fight for the Right
- Date: 31 October 1992
- Venue: Earls Court Exhibition Centre, Kensington, London, UK
- Title(s) on the line: Commonwealth heavyweight title

Tale of the tape
| Boxer | Lennox Lewis | Donovan Ruddock |
| Nickname | The Lion | Razor |
| Hometown | London, England | Toronto, Ontario, Canada |
| Pre-fight record | 21–0 (18 KO) | 25–3–1 (20 KO) |
| Age | 27 years, 1 month | 28 years, 10 months |
| Height | 6 ft 5 in (196 cm) | 6 ft 3 in (191 cm) |
| Weight | 227 lb (103 kg) | 231 1/2 lb (105 kg) |
| Style | Orthodox | Orthodox |
| Recognition | WBC; No. 2 Ranked Heavyweight; WBA/IBF; No. 3 Ranked Heavyweight; The Ring; No. 7 Ranked Heavyweight; British, European, and Commonwealth heavyweight champion | WBC; No. 1 Ranked Heavyweight; WBA; No. 2 Ranked Heavyweight; IBF; No. 4 Ranked Heavyweight; The Ring; No. 3 Ranked Heavyweight; IBC heavyweight champion |

Result
- Lewis wins via 2nd-round KO

Lennox Lewis vs. Donovan Ruddock, billed as The Fight for the Right, was a professional boxing match contested on 31 October 1992. The fight was a WBC heavyweight title "eliminator", with the winner scheduled to challenge the winner of the Evander Holyfield–Riddick Bowe championship bout held two weeks later. In addition, Lewis' Commonwealth heavyweight title was also on the line.

== Background ==
In 1991, the number one and two ranked heavyweights, Mike Tyson and Donovan "Razor" Ruddock had two matches in order to determine who would next face Evander Holyfield for the Undisputed Heavyweight Championship. The first match took place on 18 March 1991, with Tyson winning the bout by seventh-round technical knockout after referee Richard Steele stopped the fight as Tyson was landing a six-punch combination on Ruddock. However, Ruddock and his camp complained that Steele had stopped the fight too early and demanded a rematch with Tyson, to which Tyson's camp agreed. The rematch took place on 28 June 1991 but Tyson was again able to pick up the victory, this time by unanimous decision. With Tyson now the number one contender, a match with Holyfield was made for November of that year. Before that match could take place, Tyson was pulled out with an injury and shortly after, was convicted and sentenced to six years in prison for the rape of Desiree Washington. As such, Ruddock became the WBC's number one ranked heavyweight and was matched up against the number two ranked heavyweight, 1988 Gold Medalist Lennox Lewis, who had yet to lose a match in his professional career. The bout would take place in Lewis' native England with the winner moving on to face the winner of the Evander Holyfield–Riddick Bowe championship bout that would take place only two weeks after the Lewis–Ruddock match.

=== Allegations of steroid use against Lewis ===
At the press conference Ruddock's promoter Murad Muhammad stated that they suspect Lewis of taking steroids prior to the upcoming fight. Lewis however neither confirmed, neither denied he did take steroids. Since Ruddock was not a UK citizen, he was mandated to pass a steroid test prior to the fight while Lewis was not. When pressed by his opponent to submit to a urinalysis, Lewis refused with the backing of WBC president José Sulaimán who explained that the organization had lifted their ban on steroid use following "lots of complaints" from other fighters.

== The fights ==
=== Taylor vs. España ===
The co featured bout (actually broadcast after the main event on the HBO World Championship Boxing broadcast) saw WBA welterweight champion Meldrick Taylor make the second defence of his title against No. 1 contender Crisanto España.

==== The fight ====
España dropped Taylor in the 3rd round with a right hand. The challenger was deducted a point in the 6th for a low blow. Taylor was dropped again by a flurry in the 8th and the fight was stopped later in the round with Taylor pressed against the turnbuckle.

==== Aftermath ====
Taylor's trainer, Lou Duva speaking after the bout stated that his charge's career was over saying "He will not fight. Nobody's going to change our minds, that's for sure. I don't doubt that some of these wiseguys are going to think he should be fighting again, but if I gotta go to a commission to stop him, I'll go to a commission. The toughest thing is going to be to tell Meldrick. If he never talks to me again, fine, as long as he doesn't fight."

| Preceded by vs. Terry Norris | Meldrick Taylor's bouts 31 October 1992 | Succeeded by vs. Henry Hughes |
| Preceded by vs. David Taylor | Crisanto España's bouts 31 October 1992 | Succeeded by vs. Rodolfo Aguilar |

=== Main Event ===
For nearly the entire first round, Lewis was able to keep the hard-hitting Ruddock at bay by effectively using his left jab and minimizing Ruddock's offense in the process. With 10 seconds left in the round, Ruddock ducked in an attempt to size up Lewis, but Lewis was able to land a quick, powerful right hand that dropped Ruddock to the canvas. Ruddock was able to answer referee Joe Cortez's 10 count as the round came to an end. Lewis would continue his attack early in the second round, dropping Ruddock for the second time with a combination while Ruddock was backed into the corner. Ruddock was able to get back up but was met with a furious rally from Lewis, who was able to drop Ruddock for the third time in the match with another combination. Following the knockdown, Cortez immediately stopped the fight and awarded the victory to Lewis by way of knockout.

== Aftermath ==
Only two weeks after Lewis' defeat of Ruddock, Riddick Bowe would defeat Evander Holyfield to become the new Undisputed Heavyweight Champion. Per the agreement, Bowe was now obligated to face Lewis in his first defense of his newly won titles, but negotiations for the fight broke down after the two sides could not reach an agreement on a 90–10 split of the fights planned $32 million purse. Lewis was then offered $2.5 million to take an interim fight against an opponent of his choosing and then fight Bowe for $9 million, but that deal was also rejected. On 14 December 1992 Bowe officially vacated his WBC title at a press conference in which he tossed the belt into the trash and Lewis was named the new WBC Heavyweight champion that same day. Lewis responded to Bowe's refusal to fight him by giving him the derogatory nickname of "Chicken Bowe". Though Lewis had originally hoped to face George Foreman in his first defense, he ultimately agreed to face the WBC's number one contender Tony Tucker in his first defense, winning the bout by unanimous decision.

== Undercard ==
Confirmed bouts:

| Winner | Loser | Weight division/title belt(s) disputed | Result |
|---|---|---|---|
| (Venezuela) Crisanto España | (United States) Meldrick Taylor | WBA World welterweight title | 8th round TKO. |
Non-TV bouts
| (South Africa) Dingaan Thobela | (United Kingdom) Tony Foster | Lightweight (8 rounds) | 8th round PTS. |
| (Sweden) George Scott | (United Kingdom) Wayne Shepherd | Welterweight (8 rounds) | 6th round TKO. |

== Broadcasting ==
| Country | Broadcaster |
|---|---|
| United Kingdom | Sky Sports |
| United States | HBO |

| Preceded by vs. Mike Dixon | Lennox Lewis's bouts 31 October 1992 | Succeeded by vs. Tony Tucker |
| Preceded by vs. Phil Jackson | Donovan Ruddock's bouts 31 October 1992 | Succeeded by vs. Anthony Wade |
Awards
| Previous: Michael Nunn vs. James Toney | KO Magazine Knockout of the Year; 1992 | Next: Julian Jackson vs. Gerald McClellan |
