= Dennis Milton =

American boxer (1961–2026)

Personal information
- Nickname: The Magician
- Born: August 23, 1961 New York City, U.S.
- Died: January 27, 2026 (aged 64)
- Weight: Middleweight

Boxing career
- Stance: Orthodox

Boxing record
- Total fights: 22
- Wins: 16
- Win by KO: 5
- Losses: 5
- Draws: 1
Medal record
Men's amateur boxing
Representing United States
Pan American Games
Silver medal – second place	1983 Caracas	Light middleweight

Dennis Milton (August 23, 1961 – January 27, 2026) was an American professional boxer.

== Amateur career ==
Milton had a stellar amateur career, having won four New York Golden Gloves Championships. Milton won the 1981 165 lb Open Championship and won the 156 lb Open Championships in 1982, 1983 and 1984. In 1981, Milton defeated future World Champion Iran Barkley of the Knights Community Center in the finals to win the 165 lb Open Championship. Milton beat Anthony Dimasso of the Nassau Police Boys Club to win the 1982 156 lb Open Championship, when the referee stopped the fight in the second round. In 1983, Milton defeated Mark Weinman of the Police Athletic League's 110th Precinct in the finals to win the 156 lb Open Championship, and captured silver at the 1983 Pan American Games. Milton won his fourth New York Golden Gloves Championship in 1984 by defeating Jesse Lanton of the Rockland County Police Athletic League in the 156 lb Open finals.

He trained at the Police Athletic League's Webster Center in the Bronx, New York.

== Professional career ==
Known as "The Magician", Milton turned professional in 1985 and had limited success. His most notable victory came over future champion Gerald McClellan in 1989 in an eight round decision win. The win triggered a streak which led to a bout against WBC Middleweight Title holder Julian Jackson in 1991. The bout ended quickly, with Jackson scoring a 1st round KO. In 1992, Milton lost to Bernard Hopkins via TKO, and left professional boxing for good after losing to Aaron Davis by TKO in 1995.

== Death ==
Milton died on January 27, 2026, at the age of 64 at the Forest Houses in Morrisania, Bronx.
