= Crisanto España =

Venezuelan boxer

Personal information
- Nickname: Claws
- Born: October 25, 1964 (age 61) Ciudad Bolívar, Venezuela
- Height: 5 ft 10 in (178 cm)
- Weight: Welterweight

Boxing career
- Stance: Orthodox

Boxing record
- Total fights: 32
- Wins: 31
- Win by KO: 25
- Losses: 1

Crisanto España (born October 25, 1964, in Venezuela) is a former boxer who was the WBA welterweight champion of the world.

== Professional career ==
España fought out of Belfast, Northern Ireland and turned pro in 1984 after accumulating a 54-10 amateur record. España impressively won his first 30 fights, including the WBA Welterweight Title with an upset TKO in the 8th round over Meldrick Taylor in 1992. He successfully defended the title twice including against Panama's Rodolfo Aguilar, before being stopped by Ike Quartey in the 11th round in 1994. España fought only once more, in 1995 and retired with a record of 31-1-0 with 25 KOs.

== Professional boxing record ==
32 fights	31 wins	1 loss
By knockout	25	1
By decision	5	0
By disqualification	1	0

No.	Result	Record	Opponent	Type	Round, time	Date	Location	Notes
32	Win	31–1	Paul Wesley	PTS	6 (6)	1995-03-18	Green Glens Arena, Millstreet, Ireland	
31	Loss	30–1	Ike Quartey	TKO	11 (12)	1994-06-04	Palais des sports Marcel-Cerdan, Levallois-Perret, France	Lost WBA welterweight title
30	Win	30–0	Donovan Boucher	TKO	10 (12)	Oct 9, 1993	Old Trafford, Manchester, England, U.K.	Retained WBA welterweight title
29	Win	29–0	Rodolfo Aguilar	UD	12 (12)	1993-05-05	Ulster Hall, Belfast, Northern Ireland, U.K.	Retained WBA welterweight title
28	Win	28–0	Meldrick Taylor	TKO	8 (12)	Oct 31, 1992	Earls Court Exhibition Centre, Kensington, England, U.K.	Won WBA welterweight title
27	Win	27–0	David Taylor	TKO	7 (8)	1992-07-03	Pontault-Combault, France	
26	Win	26–0	Kevin Whaley El	TKO	1 (?)	1992-06-11	Pabellón de La Casilla, Bilbao, Spain	
25	Win	25–0	Hector Hugo Vilte	TKO	7 (12)	1991-11-13	Maysfield Leisure Centre, Belfast, Northern Ireland, U.K.	Retained WBC International welterweight title
24	Win	24–0	Newton Barnett	RTD	4 (8)	1991-09-07	Maysfield Leisure Centre, Belfast, Northern Ireland, U.K.	
23	Win	23–0	Larry McCall	TKO	4 (?)	1991-05-30	Palacio de los Deportes, Madrid, Spain	
22	Win	22–0	Luis Santana	UD	12 (12)	1991-02-12	Maysfield Leisure Centre, Belfast, Northern Ireland, U.K.	Won vacant WBC International welterweight title
21	Win	21–0	Luis Mora	TKO	7 (10)	1990-10-30	Maysfield Leisure Centre, Belfast, Northern Ireland, U.K.	
20	Win	20–0	Felix Dubray	KO	4 (8)	1990-09-15	Kings Hall, Belfast, Northern Ireland, U.K.	
19	Win	19–0	Francisco Bernabe Bobadilla	KO	4 (10)	1990-05-23	Kings Hall, Belfast, Northern Ireland, U.K.	
18	Win	18–0	Jorge Hernandez	TKO	1 (6)	1990-03-28	G-Mex Centre, Manchester, England, U.K.	
17	Win	17–0	Delfino Marin	TKO	6 (8)	1990-02-21	Ulster Hall, Belfast, Northern Ireland, U.K.	
16	Win	16–0	Lloyd Christie	RTD	3 (8)	1989-12-13	Sports Centre, Kirkby, England, U.K.	
15	Win	15–0	Mario Moreno	DQ	1 (?)	1989-11-29	Ulster Hall, Belfast, Northern Ireland, U.K.	
14	Win	14–0	Carlos Zambrano	TKO	2 (?)	1989-10-31	Ulster Hall, Belfast, Northern Ireland, U.K.	
13	Win	13–0	Del Bryan	PTS	8 (8)	1989-05-10	Royal Albert Hall, Kensington, England, U.K.	
12	Win	12–0	Antonio Campbell	TKO	2 (8)	1989-04-12	Ulster Hall, Belfast, Northern Ireland, U.K.	
11	Win	11–0	Judas Clottey	TKO	2 (8)	1989-03-08	Ulster Hall, Belfast, Northern Ireland, U.K.	
10	Win	10–0	Mike Essett	TKO	2 (8)	1989-02-20	NSC Grosvenor House, Mayfair, England, U.K.	
9	Win	9–0	Billy Buchanan	TKO	3 (8)	1989-01-25	Ulster Hall, Belfast, Northern Ireland, U.K.	
8	Win	8–0	Gary Pemberton	TKO	1 (8)	1988-12-14	Sports Centre, Kirkby, England, U.K.	
7	Win	7–0	Simon Eubanks	TKO	1 (8)	1988-12-07	Ulster Hall, Belfast, Northern Ireland, U.K.	
6	Win	6–0	Dave Pierre	PTS	6 (6)	1988-10-19	Ulster Hall, Belfast, Northern Ireland, U.K.	
5	Win	5–0	Rolando Ruiz	KO	1 (6)	1987-02-21	Gimnasio Nuevo Panama, Panama City, Panama	
4	Win	4–0	Edgar Rodriguez	TKO	3 (?)	1985-09-07	Caracas, Venezuela	
3	Win	3–0	Jorge Medina	TKO	1 (?)	1984-10-10	Porlamar, Venezuela	
2	Win	2–0	Jose Campos	TKO	3 (?)	1984-07-13	Carúpano, Venezuela	
1	Win	1–0	Elias Gonzalez	TKO	1 (?)	1984-03-30	Ciudad Bolívar, Venezuela	

== Personal life ==
He has two children named; Crisanto and Nico Espana. His older brother Ernesto España was the World Boxing Association lightweight champion in 1979 and 1980.

== See also ==
- Notable boxing families
- List of world welterweight boxing champions

Sporting positions
Regional boxing titles
Vacant Title last held by Luis García	WBC International welterweight champion February 12, 1991 – 1992; Vacated	Vacant Title next held by Grahame Cheney
World boxing titles
Preceded by Meldrick Taylor	WBA welterweight champion October 31, 1992 – June 4, 1994	Succeeded by Ike Quartey
