= Morris East =

Filipino boxer

Personal information
- Nationality: Filipino
- Born: August 8, 1973 (age 52) Olongapo, Philippines
- Height: 5 ft 6 in (168 cm)
- Weight: Light welterweight

Boxing career
- Stance: Southpaw

Boxing record
- Total fights: 25
- Wins: 20
- Win by KO: 12
- Losses: 4
- No contests: 1

Morris East (born August 8, 1973, in Olongapo, Philippines) is a retired Filipino professional boxer and boxing trainer. East is the former GAB Light Middleweight, OPBF and WBA World Light Welterweight champion. Morris has trained world champions Zab Judah and Nonito Donaire.

== Amateur career ==
As a teenager, East moved to Cebu City and was spotted by Lito Cortes who brought him to the Cebu Coliseum gym. Promoter Sammy Gello-ani then offered him amateur fights to keep him earning for his meals.

== Professional career ==
=== WBA Light Welterweight Championship ===
East turned professional in 1989, at the young age of 15, and won the WBA World Light Welterweight Championship by defeating Akinobu Hiranaka with an 11th-round TKO victory in Tokyo on 9 September 1992. With the victory, East became the youngest ever Filipino to hold a world championship in boxing at the age of 19 years and 31 days old. He is also the second youngest boxer to win a world title at 140 lbs., second to Puerto Rico's Wilfred Benítez, who won the WBA World Jr. Welterweight title when he was 17 years old, the youngest ever to win a world title in boxing history. The victory over Hiranaka was named Ring Magazine Knockout of the Year for 1992. Morris lost the title in his first defense against Martín Coggi.

After winning and defending the Philippines Games & Amusement Board Light Middleweight Championship in 1995, East retired from boxing at only 21 years of age. To this day, East holds the record for the youngest retirement of a former world champion.

== Professional boxing record ==
25 fights	20 wins	4 losses
By knockout	12	1
By decision	8	3
No contests	1	

No.	Result	Record	Opponent	Type	Round, time	Date	Location	Notes
25	Win	20–4 (1)	Robert Azumah	UD	12	27 May 1995	Ninoy Aquino Stadium, Manila, Metro Manila, Philippines	Retained GAB super-welterweight title
24	Win	19–4 (1)	Jun Castillo	TKO	1 (12)	25 Mar 1995	Iloilo Sports Complex, Iloilo City, Iloilo, Philippines	Won vacant GAB super-welterweight title
23	Loss	18–4 (1)	Jintoku Sato	UD	10	13 Feb 1995	Japan	
22	Win	18–3 (1)	Jeff Malcolm	UD	10	26 Nov 1994	Cebu Coliseum, Cebu City, Cebu, Philippines	
21	Win	17–3 (1)	Lee Yung-Yong	KO	6 (10)	14 May 1994	Araneta Center, Quezon City, Metro Manila, Philippines	
20	Loss	16–3 (1)	Martín Coggi	TKO	8 (12), 2:50	12 Jan 1993	Estadio Super Domo, Mar del Plata, Buenos Aires, Argentina	Lost WBA super-lightweight title
19	Win	16–2 (1)	Akinobu Hiranaka	TKO	11 (12), 1:47	9 Sep 1992	Nippon Budokan, Tokyo, Japan	Won WBA super-lightweight title
18	Win	15–2 (1)	Dindo Canoy	TKO	9 (10), 0:47	17 Jul 1992	Rizal Memorial Coliseum, Manila, Metro Manila, Philippines	
17	Win	14–2 (1)	Kim Pyung-Sub	KO	10 (12), 1:22	29 Feb 1992	Citizen Hall, Bucheon, South Korea	Won OPBF light welterweight title
16	Win	13–2 (1)	Flash Ursus	UD	10	20 Dec 1991	Olympia Sports Complex, Makati City, Metro Manila, Philippines	
15	Win	12–2 (1)	Florencio Pastor Jr.	TKO	9 (10)	19 Oct 1991	Araneta Coliseum, Quezon City, Metro Manila, Philippines	
14	Win	11–2 (1)	Tata Escorro	TKO	7 (10)	28 Aug 1991	Barangay Marulas, Valenzuela City, Metro Manila, Philippines	
13	Win	10–2 (1)	Joey Carpas	PTS	10	12 Jun 1991	Quezon City, Metro Manila, Philippines	
12	NC	9–2 (1)	Jojo Cayson	NC	6 (10), 0:35	22 Dec 1990	Cebu Coliseum, Cebu City, Cebu, Philippines	NC after both fighters refused to engage
11	Win	9–2	Armando Anzalez	UD	10	12 Oct 1990	Rizal Memorial Coliseum, Manila, Metro Manila, Philippines	
10	Win	8–2	Ric de la Paz	TKO	4 (10)	31 Aug 1990	Ninoy Aquino Stadium, Manila, Metro Manila, Philippines	
9	Win	7–2	Pablo Pucay	TKO	6 (10), 2:32	14 Jul 1990	Baguio College Foundation Gym, Baguio City, Benguet, Philippines	
8	Loss	6–2	Fernando Palad	SD	10	31 Mar 1990	Araneta Coliseum, Quezon City, Metro Manila, Philippines	
7	Win	6–1	Alberto Saxon	TKO	5 (10)	21 Jan 1990	Barangay Malinta, Valenzuela City, Metro Manila, Philippines	
6	Win	5–1	Boy Masuay	TKO	6 (10)	29 Dec 1989	Pasay City Sports Complex, Pasay City, Metro Manila, Philippines	
5	Win	4–1	Armando Andales	UD	10	30 Nov 1989	Angeles City, Pampanga, Philippines	
4	Loss	3–1	Boy Masuay	MD	10	30 Sep 1989	PRCI, Manila, Metro Manila, Philippines	
3	Win	3–0	Geronimo Magallanes	UD	8	21 Jul 1989	PRCI, Manila, Metro Manila, Philippines	
2	Win	2–0	Fer Guevarra	UD	6	23 Jun 1989	PRCI, Manila, Metro Manila, Philippines	
1	Win	1–0	Jessie Miranda	TKO	6 (6)	3 May 1989	Elorde Sports Center, Paranaque City, Metro Manila, Philippines	

== Training career ==
East moved to San Diego, California in 1996 and later moved to Las Vegas, where he works as a fight trainer in the Johnny Tocco gym. In 2011, he worked with IBF light welterweight titleholder Zab Judah and WBC/WBO bantamweight champion Nonito Donaire. East also worked with Eddie Mustafa Muhammad.

== Personal life ==
Born of a Filipina and black American U.S. Navy sailor, East didn't meet his father until he became champion. He traveled from the Philippines to the United States a month after winning his WBA belt to locate his father, John East Sr. With the help of a long-lost sister and the CNN news team, the father was located in Oakland, California and their first meeting was broadcast by CNN. Morris improved his father's living condition but his father, suffering from bad health, died of cancer a few months later.

== See also ==
- List of southpaw stance boxers
- List of Filipino boxing world champions
- List of world light-welterweight boxing champions

Sporting positions
Regional boxing titles
Preceded by Pyung Sub Kim	OPBF light welterweight champion February 29, 1992 – 1992; Vacated	Vacant Title next held by Kyung Hyun Park
World boxing titles
Preceded by Akinobu Hiranaka	WBA super lightweight champion September 9, 1992 – January 12, 1993	Succeeded by Martín Coggi
Awards
Previous: No award was given in 1992	The Ring Knockout of the Year; 1992; With: Kennedy McKinney KO11 Welcome Ncita	Next: Gerald McClellan; TKO5 Julian Jackson
