= Akinobu Hiranaka =

Japanese boxer

Personal information
- Nationality: Japanese
- Born: Nobuaki Hiranaka; November 14, 1963 (age 62) Yaese, Okinawa, Japan
- Height: 5 ft 7 in (170 cm)
- Weight: Light welterweight

Boxing career
- Reach: 70 in (178 cm)
- Stance: Orthodox

Boxing record
- Total fights: 22
- Wins: 20
- Win by KO: 18
- Losses: 2

Akinobu Hiranaka (平仲 明信, born Nobuaki Hiranaka, on November 14, 1963) is a Japanese former boxer. He was a world champion boxer in the Light welterweight (Super lightweight or former Junior welterweight) division. He won the WBA Junior Welterweight championship of the world in 1992, and competed at the 1984 Los Angeles Olympic Games.

He is one of the few Japanese champions that lacked financial backing from large gyms or television companies, and he had to personally negotiate with opponents to land a shot at the world title.

== Amateur career ==
Hiranaka won an amateur boxing tournament in high school, training at the local Ryukyu boxing gym. He continued boxing at Nippon University, and fought in the 1984 Los Angeles Olympics while attending (he lost in the second round). He had a successful amateur career, making 37 of his 43 wins by knockout.

=== Olympic results ===
Welterweight (– 67 kg), 1984

- 1st round bye
- Lost to Genaro Leon (Mexico) 0-5

== Professional career ==
Hiranaka's success in the amateur ring made him one of Japan's best prospects in the light welterweight division. He won the Japanese light welterweight title in only his fourth professional fight, knocking out his opponent in the 6th round. Hiranaka became the WBA's top-ranked fighter in the light welterweight division, but lack of financial support made it difficult for him to challenge the world title. He had to defend the Japanese light welterweight title 9 times before finally getting a fight at the world stage.

Hiranaka challenged Juan Martin Coggi of Argentina in Italy on April 29, 1989, for the WBA title. Hiranaka knocked Coggi down twice in the third round. However, Hiranaka lost by a decision for the first loss of his career. This match was controversial for the decision with excessive favor to the Italian-Argentine boxer Coggi, while Coggi was knocked down by Hiranaka.

Even after losing, Hiranaka retained his world ranking, and waited for another chance for the world title. However, Hiranaka spent three years without a title match, and did not fight at all in 1990.

Hiranaka finally got his second chance in April 1992, fighting in Mexico City against Puerto Rican world champion, Edwin Rosario. Hiranaka surprised onlookers by knocking out the champion only 92 seconds into the first round. He immediately pinned the champion against the ropes, and landed a furious array of punches, until the referee saw that the champion Edwin Rosario had been knocked unconscious while standing up. This fight remains as the shortest world title match in the light welterweight division.

Despite making an epic entrance onto the world stage, Hiranaka lost his title after only five months to Morris East from the Philippines. Hiranaka had led the fight going into the 11th round, but was knocked out in an unexpected blow from the challenger. This knockout was named the 1992 Ring Magazine Knockout of the Year. Hiranaka was diagnosed with an intracranial hemorrhage after the fight, and was forced into retirement. His record was 20-2-0 (18KOs). He also has the highest KO percentage of any Japanese world champion boxer (90%).

== Professional boxing record ==
22 fights	20 wins	2 losses
By knockout	18	1
By decision	2	1

No.	Result	Record	Opponent	Type	Round, time	Date	Location	Notes
22	Loss	20–2	Morris East	TKO	11 (12)	1992-09-09	Nippon Budokan, Tokyo, Japan	Lost WBA super lightweight title
21	Win	20–1	Edwin Rosario	TKO	1 (12)	1992-04-10	Toreo de Cuatro Caminos, Mexico City, Mexico	Won WBA super lightweight title
20	Win	19–1	Kwon Shik Kim	KO	5 (10)	1991-01-29	Korakuen Hall, Tokyo, Japan	
19	Win	18–1	Boy Masuay	TKO	8 (10)	1989-11-23	City Gymnasium, Urasoe, Japan	
18	Loss	17–1	Martín Coggi	UD	12 (12)	1989-04-29	Palazzo Dello Sport, Vasto, Italy	For WBA super lightweight title
17	Win	17–0	Yoshihiro Yamamoto	PTS	10 (10)	1989-03-07	Korakuen Hall, Tokyo, Japan	
16	Win	16–0	Tricky Kawaguchi	TKO	5 (10)	1988-07-21	General Exhibition Arena, Kitakyushu, Japan	Retained Japanese super lightweight title
15	Win	15–0	Seiji Nagasawa	KO	1 (10)	1988-05-31	Korakuen Hall, Tokyo, Japan	Retained Japanese super lightweight title
14	Win	14–0	Tadafumi Miura	KO	1 (10)	1988-04-24	Daini Junior High School Gym, Ishigaki, Japan	Retained Japanese super lightweight title
13	Win	13–0	Eiji Kikuzaki	KO	2 (10)	1988-01-26	Korakuen Hall, Tokyo, Japan	Retained Japanese super lightweight title
12	Win	12–0	Tetsuya Manaka	TKO	8 (10)	1987-10-13	Korakuen Hall, Tokyo, Japan	Retained Japanese super lightweight title
11	Win	11–0	Naoki Ito	KO	1 (10)	1987-08-11	Korakuen Hall, Tokyo, Japan	Retained Japanese super lightweight title
10	Win	10–0	Archie Garcia	TKO	5 (10)	1987-06-16	Korakuen Hall, Tokyo, Japan	
9	Win	9–0	Yoshifumi Kitajima	PTS	10 (10)	1987-03-15	City Gymnasium, Naha, Japan	Retained Japanese super lightweight title
8	Win	8–0	Nilo Acido	TKO	7 (10)	1986-12-14	Gushito Gym, Okinawa, Japan	
7	Win	7–0	Makoto Ito	KO	2 (10)	1986-08-17	City Gymnasium, Ginowan, Japan	Retained Japanese super lightweight title
6	Win	6–0	Masahiro Tanabu	KO	5 (10)	1986-05-01	Korakuen Hall, Tokyo, Japan	Retained Japanese super lightweight title
5	Win	5–0	Teruhide Nishida	KO	1 (10)	1986-04-06	City Gymnasium, Okinawa, Japan	
4	Win	4–0	Masahiro Tanabu	KO	6 (10)	1986-01-09	Korakuen Hall, Tokyo, Japan	Won Japanese super lightweight title
3	Win	3–0	Thai Suracharern	KO	2 (10)	1985-10-02	Onoyama Gym, Naha, Okinawa, Japan	
2	Win	2–0	Naomi To	KO	4 (6)	1985-06-30	Sakuranomiya Skating Rink, Osaka, Osaka, Japan	
1	Win	1–0	Kazumi Yokoi	KO	1 (8)	1985-03-24	Konan High School Gym, Naha, Japan	

== Post-retirement ==
He now runs the Hiranaka Boxing School Gym in Okinawa, and has taught boxing at Seido Kaikan. Deceased K-1 champion Andy Hug trained at Hiranaka's gym in Okinawa before the K-1 Grand Prix tournament.

== See also ==
- Boxing in Japan
- List of Japanese boxing world champions
- List of world light-welterweight boxing champions

Sporting positions
Regional boxing titles
Preceded by Masahiro Tanabu	Japanese light welterweight champion January 9, 1986 – 1988; Vacated	Vacant Title next held by Yoshifumi Kitajima
World boxing titles
Preceded by Edwin Rosario	WBA super lightweight champion April 10, 1992 – September 9, 1992	Succeeded by Morris East
