= Ginowan City Gymnasium =

Arena in Ginowan, Okinawa, Japan

Coordinates: 26°16′48.7″N 127°44′9.1″E

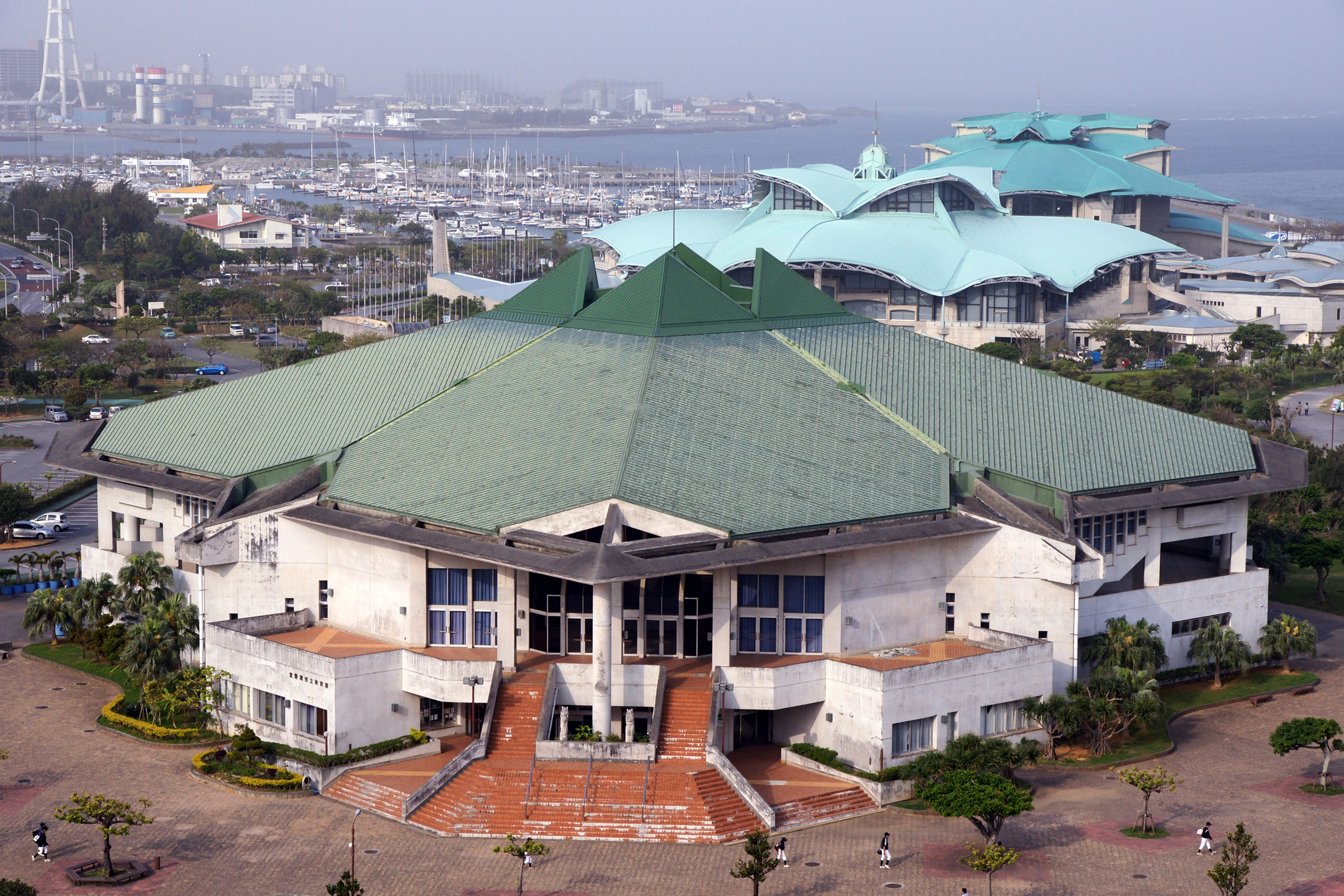
- Interactive map of Ginowan City Gymnasium
- Full name: Ginowan City Gymnasium
- Location: Ginowan, Okinawa, Japan
- Owner: Ginowan city
- Operator: Ginowan city

Construction
- Opened: March 15, 1986
- Cost

Ginowan City Gymnasium is an arena in Ginowan, Okinawa, Japan.

== Facilities ==
- Arena - 1,917m^{2}

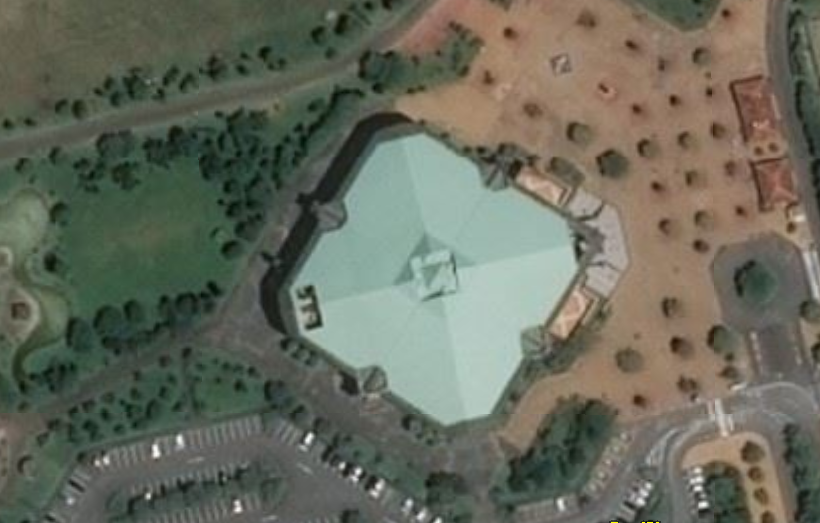
Satellite view
