= Thomas Tate (boxer) =

American boxer

Thomas Tate (born 19 December 1965 in Detroit, Michigan) is an American former boxer. In his professional career he twice fought for world titles at middleweight, losing to Julian Jackson and Roy Jones Jr. respectively. He later twice challenged Sven Ottke unsuccessfully for the super middleweight title. While training to fight Joe Calzaghe, Tate suffered a back injury and retired from the sport with a record of 41–7 (28 KOs).
