= Oscar De La Hoya vs. Darryl Tyson =

Boxing match

Prelude to Glory: De La Hoya vs. Tyson
- Date: February 9, 1996
- Venue: Caesars Palace, Paradise, Nevada, U.S.

Tale of the tape
Boxer	Oscar De La Hoya	Darryl Tyson
Nickname	The Golden Boy	Terrible T
Hometown	East Los Angeles, California, U.S.	Washington, D.C., U.S.
Purse	$1,500,000	$75,000
Pre-fight record	20–0 (18 KO)	47–8–1 (24 KO)
Age	23 years	35 years, 3 months
Height	5 ft 11 in (180 cm)	5 ft 7 in (170 cm)
Weight	140 lb (64 kg)	139 lb (63 kg)
Style	Orthodox	Orthodox
Recognition	WBO; Lightweight champion The Ring; No. 1 Ranked Lightweight; The Ring No. 4 ranked pound-for-pound fighter	

Result
- De La Hoya wins via 2nd-round knockout

Oscar De La Hoya vs. Darryl Tyson, billed as Prelude to Glory was a professional boxing match contested on February 9, 1996.

== Background ==
Just ahead of his fight with Jesse James Leija at Madison Square Garden in December 1995, reigning WBO lightweight champion Oscar De La Hoya had already announced that the Leija fight would be his final one as a lightweight as he looked ahead to a highly anticipated big money fight against WBC super lightweight champion Julio César Chávez in the summer of 1996. After successfully defending his WBO lightweight title for the final time against Leija, De La Hoya was set to make his super lightweight debut in February 1996 in what was to be a tune up before meeting Chávez. Initial plans called for De La Hoya to face former IBF super lightweight champion Charles Murray, while Chávez would face Darryl Tyson in a 10-round non-title bout in an event billed as Prelude to Glory. However, when the event was announced, it was De La Hoya who would face Tyson while Chávez would instead meet Scott Walker. Both De La Hoya and Chávez had already been guaranteed $9,000,000 each for their proposed June 7th fight, though it was contingent on both men winning their tune-up bouts against Tyson and Walker. Promoter Bob Arum expressed concern that the De La Hoya–Chávez fight could potentially be in jeopardy, stating "If I had my way, Oscar and Julio would not be fighting Friday night. I've seen too many big fights spoiled by these kind of tune up fights."

== The fight ==
After taking a more tactical approach in the first round, De La Hoya dominated Tyson in the second round. With a minute to go in the round, De La Hoya staggered Tyson with a left hook then backed him into the corner after landing another combination. De La Hoya then landed a right hand to Tyson's kidney which caused Tyson to fall to his knees immediately. Tyson made no attempt to get back as he was counted out, giving De La Hoya the victory by knockout at 2:38 of the round.

== Fight card ==
Confirmed bouts:

Weight Class	Weight		vs.		Method	Round	Notes
Super Lightweight	140 lbs.	Oscar De La Hoya	def.	Darryl Tyson	KO	2/12
Super Featherweight	130 lbs.	Julio César Chávez	def.	Scott Walker	TKO	2/10
Lightweight	135 lbs.	George Scott (c)	def.	Shane Gannon	KO	1/12	^{note 1}
Heavyweight	200+ lbs.	Jeremy Williams	def.	Samson Cohen	TKO	1/10
Heavyweight	200+ lbs.	Alonzo Highsmith	def.	Gary Butler	TKO	2/4

^Note 1 For WBU Lightweight title

== Broadcasting ==
Country	Broadcaster
United States	HBO

Preceded by vs. Jesse James Leija	Oscar De La Hoya's bouts 9 February 1996	Succeeded by vs. Julio César Chávez
Preceded by vs. David Taylor	Darryl Tyson's bouts 9 February 1996	Succeeded by vs. Shea Neary
