= Julio César Chávez vs. Oscar De La Hoya =

Boxing match

Ultimate Glory
- Date: June 7, 1996
- Venue: Caesars Palace, Paradise, Nevada, U.S.
- Title(s) on the line: WBC super lightweight title

Tale of the tape
Boxer	Julio César Chávez	Oscar De La Hoya
Nickname	El Gran Campeón Mexicano ("The Great Mexican Champion")	The Golden Boy
Hometown	Ciudad Obregón, Sonora, Mexico	East Los Angeles, California, U.S.
Purse	$9,000,000	$9,000,000
Pre-fight record	96–1–1 (79 KO)	21–0 (19 KO)
Age	33 years, 10 months	23 years, 4 months
Height	5 ft 7 in (170 cm)	5 ft 10 in (178 cm)
Weight	139 lb (63 kg)	139 lb (63 kg)
Style	Orthodox	Orthodox
Recognition	WBC; Super Lightweight Champion; 3-division world champion	The Ring No. 4 ranked pound-for-pound fighter Former lightweight champion

Result
- De La Hoya wins via 4th-round TKO

Julio César Chávez vs. Oscar De La Hoya, billed as Ultimate Glory, was a professional boxing match contested on June 7, 1996, for the WBC super lightweight championship.

== Background ==
After both Julio César Chávez and Oscar De La Hoya defeated their opponents (Scott Walker and Darryl Tyson respectively) in tune-up bouts on February 9, 1996, the two fighters agreed to face one another in a "dream match" set for June of that year. The undefeated De La Hoya had already won world titles in two divisions and was looking to capture a second major world title (third in total) in a third weight class at only 23–years old. The 33–year old Chavez, meanwhile, was entering his 99th fight and still possessed one of the most impressive records in boxing history, having gone 96–1–1 and capturing four world titles in three divisions in his 16–year career. The bout was highly anticipated, with some even calling the biggest fight in Latino boxing history and both fighters taking home a then–career high $9 million purse. Despite his vast experience advantage over De La Hoya (who had only fought professionally 21 times up to that point) and his status as champion, the aging Chavez was initially installed as a 3–1 underdog before odds were dropped to 2–1 by the time of the fight. Though both fighters were of Mexican heritage, most Mexican and Mexican–American fans favored Chavez as De La Hoya had been born in the United States. In promotional stops for their fight, De La Hoya was largely booed by the largely Hispanic populations of Phoenix, San Diego and even his native Los Angeles.

A controversial decision was made prior to the fight as De La Hoya's promoter Bob Arum refused to let the fight be carried on Pay-per-view and instead opted for it to be shown almost exclusively on closed-circuit television, severely limiting the highly anticipated bouts audience. Arum claimed that he made the decision to combat the use of illegal "black boxes", which steal pay-per-view signals and allow its users to watch the program for free. Though Arum claimed that the fight would net somewhere between $60 and $90 million even without pay-per-view, the fight drew a somewhat disappointing crowd of 750,000, down from the 1.7 million fans Arum had expected, and fell well short of his expected earnings, with the fight grossing around $14 million.

== The fight ==
The fight lasted less than four rounds. Only one minute into round one, De La Hoya connected with a straight right hand that opened up a huge gash around Chavez' eye. The fight was temporally halted not even a minute later as the cut had become severe enough for the referee Joe Cortez to stop the action and allow the fight doctor, Flip Homansky, to examine it. Though Chavez was able to continue, he was unable to get any momentum and was dominated by De La Hoya for the remainder of the fight. In round four, as Chavez was finally mounting some offense, De La Hoya took control of the latter stages of the round and brutalized Chavez with a series of hard combinations and broke Chavez' nose with a left hook. As the cut around his eye had deteriorated even further, Cortez halted the fight once again and sent him to the ringside physician. Homansky then informed Cortez that Chavez could not continue due to the multiple lacerations to his face and De La Hoya was awarded with the TKO victory at 2:37 of the fourth round.

== Aftermath ==
The fighters would meet two years later, in September 1998, with De La Hoya winning when Chavez retired in the eighth round.

== Undercard ==
Confirmed bouts:

== Broadcasting ==
Country	Broadcaster
Mexico	TV Azteca
Philippines	Citynet Television 27
United Kingdom	Sky Sports
United States	HBO
Thailand	Channel 7

Preceded by vs. Scott Walker	Julio César Chávez's bouts 7 June 1996	Succeeded by vs. Joey Gamache
Preceded by vs. Darryl Tyson	Oscar De La Hoya's bouts 7 June 1996	Succeeded by vs. Miguel Ángel González
