= José Luis Ramírez vs. Héctor Camacho =

The Moment of Truth
- Date: August 10, 1985
- Venue: Riviera Hotel & Casino, Winchester, Nevada, U.S.
- Title(s) on the line: WBC lightweight title

Tale of the tape
| Boxer | José Luis Ramírez | Héctor Camacho |
| Nickname | El Zurdo ("The Lefty") | Macho |
| Hometown | Culiacán, Mexico | Bayamón, Puerto Rico |
| Purse | $400,000 | $500,000 |
| Pre-fight record | 90–4 (74 KO) | 26–0 (15 KO) |
| Age | 26 years, 8 months | 23 years, 2 months |
| Height | 5 ft (152 cm) 6+1/2 | 5 ft (152 cm) 6+1/2 |
| Weight | 134 3/4 lb (61 kg) | 134 lb (61 kg) |
| Style | Southpaw | Southpaw |
| Recognition | WBC; Lightweight Champion | WBC; No. 2 Ranked Lightweight |

Result
- Camacho wins via 12-round unanimous decision (119–112, 119–109, 118–111)

José Luis Ramírez vs. Héctor Camacho, billed as the The Moment of Truth, was a professional match contested on August 10, 1985, for the WBC lightweight title.

== Background ==
In July 1984, Billy Giles, the then-manager of reigning WBC super featherweight champion Héctor Camacho, announced that Camacho was relinquishing his title as a result of Camacho feeling he could no longer make the 130-pound super featherweight limit and moving up to the 135-pound lightweight division. Camacho had been unable to get down to 130-pounds in his last fight, a non-title bout against Rafael Williams in May, and fought as a lightweight instead. Giles stated that Camacho was pursuing a fight against then-WBA lightweight champion Livingstone Bramble and was not interested in facing Edwin Rosario, then the WBC lightweight champion, as Rosario was promoted by Don King, who was also Camacho's promoter and whom Camacho had a rift with at a time. After an eight-month layoff, Camacho returned to boxing on January 19, 1985, defeating fringe lightweight contender Louis Burke via fifth-round corner retirement. When asked after the fight which of the three major lightweight titlists he preferred, Camacho responded "Right now, I don't think it makes any difference."

Shortly after his victory over Burke, Camacho made amends with King, signing a multi-fight deal with the promoter in early February 1985 that would see Camacho challenge the recently crowned WBC lightweight champion José Luis Ramírez, who defeated Rosario to claim the title in November the previous year. With their fight set for June 6, 1985, Ramírez and Camacho both took tune-up bouts in the months prior; Ramírez defeating J.T. Walker via fourth-round knockout in March, and Camacho defeating Roque Montoya by unanimous decision in April.

On May 9, King and co-promoter Butch Lewis were holding a press conference at New York City's Sheraton Centre Hotel & Towers officially announcing the card, dubbed D-Day Dynamite to be headlined by the Ramírez–Camacho fight. However, Camacho, who was in attendance, notified King that he had injured his left ankle and would be unable to fight on the June 6 date. A stunned King announced to media that Camacho was "going to be off the card" as he was "too important to me." Camacho would then take the podium stating to media "If I feel I got a bad leg, I ain't gonna be forced to fight. I'm facing a great fighter. I gotta be over 100, not under 100." In mid-June, the fight was officially rescheduled to August 10.

== Fight details ==
The fight would go the full 12-round distance with Camacho earning the victory by an extremely lopsided unanimous decision, having been named the winner by scores of 119–112, 119–109 and 118–111.

Camacho dominated the fight, using his speed, quickness and boxing skills to stymie Ramírez's offense. Ramírez chased the elusive Camacho, who almost never stopped moving, nearly the entire fight, but struggled to land any sustained offense as Camacho would counter-punch Ramírez whenever he drew near and attempted to engage.

Camacho would score the fight's lone knockdown in the third round, staggering Ramírez with a left hook just past the one-minute mark and then sending him down face first with another left. Ramírez answered referee Mills Lane's 10-count at five and continued, but was met with a brief but furious combination from Camacho, breaking Ramírez's nose, but backed off and resumed his strategy as Ramírez recovered. The following round, Ramírez's injured nose began to bleed profusely, which caused Lane to briefly stop the fight and call in Flip Homansky, the ringside physician, to look at the wound, after which he cleared Ramírez to continue the fight.

== Fight card ==
Confirmed bouts:

| Weight Class | Weight | | vs. | | Method | Round | Notes |
|---|---|---|---|---|---|---|---|
| Lightweight | 135 lbs. | Héctor Camacho | def. | José Luis Ramírez | UD | 12 | ^{note 1} |
| Heavyweight | 200+ lbs. | Trevor Berbick | def. | Mitch Green | MD | 12 |
| Light Middleweight | 154 lbs. | Julian Jackson | def. | José Padilla | TKO | 3/10 |
| Light Welterweight | 140 lbs. | Roque Montoya | def. | Roberto Collins | UD | 10 |
| Super Bantamweight | 122 lbs. | Tony Montoya | def. | Alvaro Ramos | PTS | 6 |
| Welterweight | 147 lbs. | Louis Howard | def. | Rafael Gomez | TKO | 3/6 |
| Featherweight | 126 lbs. | Luciano Solis | def. | Augustin Serros | TKO | 3/6 |
| Light Welterweight | 140 lbs. | Bobby Baltazar | def. | Ubaldo Castillo | KO | 2/4 |

^Note 1 For WBC Lightweight Title

== Broadcasting ==
| Country | Broadcaster |
|---|---|
| United States | HBO |

| Preceded by vs. Manuel Hernandez | José Luis Ramírez's bouts August 10, 1985 | Succeeded by vs. Nick Parker |
| Preceded by vs. Roque Montoya | Héctor Camacho's bouts August 10, 1985 | Succeeded by vs. Freddie Roach |
