= Edwin Rosario vs. Julio César Chávez =

Boxing match

Duel in the Desert
- Date: November 21, 1987
- Venue: Las Vegas Hilton, Winchester, Nevada, U.S.
- Title(s) on the line: WBA lightweight title

Tale of the tape
| Boxer | Edwin Rosario | Julio César Chávez |
| Nickname | Chapo ("Shorty") | El Gran Campeón Mexicano ("The Great Mexican Champion") |
| Hometown | Toa Baja, Puerto Rico | Ciudad Obregón, Sonora, Mexico |
| Purse | $500,000 | $200,000 |
| Pre-fight record | 26–2 (22 KO) | 56–0 (45 KO) |
| Age | 24 years, 8 months | 25 years, 4 months |
| Height | 5 ft 6 in (168 cm) | 5 ft 7 in (170 cm) |
| Weight | 135 lb (61 kg) | 134 3/4 lb (61 kg) |
| Style | Orthodox | Orthodox |
| Recognition | WBA; Lightweight Champion; The Ring; No. 1 Ranked Lightweight | WBC; Super Featherweight Champion; The Ring; No. 2 Ranked Lightweight |

Result
- Chávez wins by 11th-round technical knockout

Edwin Rosario vs. Julio César Chávez, billed as Duel in the Desert, was a professional boxing match contested on November 21, 1987, for the WBA lightweight title.

== Background ==
Just before his scheduled title defense against Danilo Cabrera on August 21, 1987, reigning WBC super featherweight champion Julio César Chávez announced that his fight against Cabrera would likely be his last in the super featherweight division and that would be moving up in weight to challenge WBA lightweight champion Edwin Rosario in the fall of that year. Rosario, in his second reign as lightweight champion, was made a 7–5 underdog against the now 54–0 Chávez. Rosario, however, strongly criticized Chávez's choice of opponents prior to facing him stating that Chávez had mostly fought "guys right out of the bar", that he would be the "first real fighter he's going to fight" and that Chávez's management had "took him by the hand and built his record." Furthermore, Rosario claimed that Chávez was afraid to fight him and had only taken the fight after being pressured into fight by his promoter Don King, though Chávez denied Rosario's claims stating that "I wouldn't have signed for the fight if I was afraid of him."

== The Fight ==
Often considered the greatest performance of his career, Chávez dominated Rosario throughout the fight, fighting well on the inside and battering Rosario with combinations to both the body and head all fight long. Chávez would connect with a staggering 61% of his 743 thrown punches while Rosario threw a similar amount (731) but connected with only 36%. By the 11th round, Rosario, who was bleeding from both his nose and mouth, suffering from a cut above his right eye and his left eye was swollen shut, had gotten backed into a corner by Chávez, who relentlessly attacked the exhausted Rosario. Finally, with Rosario taking a tremendous amount of abuse, his corner threw a white towel in the ring to signify surrender and in turn, Richard Steele stopped the fight with 22 seconds remaining, giving Chávez the victory by technical knockout.

== Fight card ==
Confirmed bouts:

| Weight Class | Weight | | vs. | | Method | Round | Notes |
|---|---|---|---|---|---|---|---|
| Lightweight | 135 lbs. | Julio César Chávez | def. | Edwin Rosario (c) | TKO | 11/12 | ^{Note 1} |
| Super Welterweight | 154 lbs. | Julian Jackson | def. | Baek In-chul | TKO | 3/12 | ^{Note 2} |
| Super Featherweight | 130 lbs. | Victor Callejas | def. | Pedro Nolasco | KO | 1/10 |
| Super Featherweight | 168 lbs. | Jose Rivera | def. | Ramiro Lozano | TKO | 2/10 |
| Super Welterweight | 154 lbs. | Santos Cardona | def. | Joey Ferrell | PTS | 8/8 |
| Bantamweight | 118 lbs. | Renaldo Carter | def. | Esteban Guzman | PTS | 8/8 |
| Cruiserweight | 190 lbs. | Freddie Delgado | def. | Paul Madison | PTS | 4/4 |

^Note 1 For WBA Lightweight title
^Note 2 For WBA Super Welterweight title

== Broadcasting ==
| Country | Broadcaster |
|---|---|
| United States | HBO |

| Preceded by vs. Juan Nazario | Edwin Rosario's bouts 21 November 1987 | Succeeded by vs. Ramiro Lozano |
| Preceded by vs. Danilo Cabrera | Julio César Chávez's bouts 21 November 1987 | Succeeded by vs. Nicky Perez |
