= Héctor Camacho vs. Edwin Rosario =

Boxing match

Friday the 13th Resurrection
- Date: June 13, 1986
- Venue: Madison Square Garden, New York City, New York, U.S.
- Title(s) on the line: WBC lightweight title

Tale of the tape
Boxer	Héctor Camacho	Edwin Rosario
Nickname	Macho	Chapo
Hometown	Bayamón, Puerto Rico	Toa Baja, Puerto Rico
Purse	$500,000	$150,000
Pre-fight record	28–0 (15 KO)	28–1 (24 KO)
Age	24 years	23 years, 2 months
Height	5 ft 7 in (170 cm)	5 ft 6 in (168 cm)
Weight	135 lb (61 kg)	134 lb (61 kg)
Style	Southpaw	Orthodox
Recognition	WBC; Lightweight Champion	WBC; No. 1 Ranked Lightweight; Former lightweight champion

Result
- Camacho wins via 12-round split decision (115–113, 115–113, 113–114)

Héctor Camacho vs. Edwin Rosario, billed as Friday the 13th Resurrection, was a professional boxing match contested on June 13, 1986, for the WBC lightweight championship.

== Background ==
Televised in the United States by HBO Boxing and in Puerto Rico by WAPA-TV (and to several other countries), the fight garnered wide media attention, especially in Puerto Rico: It was the fourth time that two Puerto Ricans battled for a world boxing title, and, at that time, it was also the world title fight that pitted the two boxers who hailed from the closest birth-places in boxing history (Camacho was born in Bayamón, while Rosario was from Toa Alta, a mere fifteen-minute car drive away from Bayamón). Sports reporter Rafael Bracero travelled to New York to make a documentary about the fighters and the fight, and even former BSN basketball star Fufi Santori, a self-declared not fan of boxing, got caught in the fight's hype, making a prediction on television on the day of the fight. He predicted Camacho would win. Camacho was criticized by a number of Puerto Ricans because of the trunks he wore that day; he wore a Puerto Rican flag, but with the flag's white star to his back. This was seen by some as an unpatriotic act, although Camacho had always proclaimed to be proud of being a Puerto Rican, and continued to proclaim so until he died in 2012.

The fight was for the WBC World Lightweight Title, earned by Camacho after his win over José Luis Ramírez, who had, in turn, beaten Rosario for the title.

=== Undercard ===
The undercard included a young Mike Tyson knocking out Reggie Gross in the first round and Julio César Chávez (who would later beat Camacho, Ramirez and Rosario) defending his WBC world Jr. Lightweight title with a seventh-round knockout of Refugio Rojas.

== The fight ==
The first three rounds were swept by Camacho on all three judges' scorecards by keeping Rosario away with his jab and outcircling the pursuing challenger. In the fourth, Rosario began to turn things around by landing an uppercut in the final seconds, which earned him the round.

In round five, Rosario connected with a left to the chin as Camacho was getting ready to fire a right hand, and Camacho's knees buckled. On the verge of falling, Camacho took his distance for the rest of the round, and Rosario continued on pursue, landing other damaging blows.

Rounds six to ten were dominated by Camacho (out of a possible fifteen combined rounds, as three judges were scoring the fight, Rosario was given only one round between rounds six and ten by one judge).

In round eleven, Rosario hurt Camacho again, with a left hook through Camacho's guard. Feeling he had a lead on the scorecards, Camacho again circled around the ring and grabbed, to avoid Rosario's punches. Rosario continued landing in round twelve, also sweeping the round on all judges' cards.

Minutes later, Camacho was announced as winner and still WBC world Lightweight champion by a split decision (scores of 115–113 twice for Camacho, and 114–113 for Rosario). The fight's result proved controversial, Puerto Ricans and other boxing fans who saw the fight have argued about the scoring ever since.

== Aftermath ==
Days later, El Vocero newspaper reported of a murder related to the fight: apparently, a man had made a bet with another man, and after Rosario lost, the murder victim told his killer that he really didn't have any money, causing the killer to get enraged and shoot him.

A rematch had been planned in 1997, but it never occurred.

On December 1, 1997, Rosario died of a pulmonary edema at age 34 while visiting his parents' house. For his part, Camacho died on November 24, 2012, at Bayamon, four days after being shot as part of a violent act where his friend was the apparent target.

Both Camacho and Rosario were later inducted into the International Boxing Hall of Fame, Rosario as a member of their 2006 class, and Camacho exactly 10 years later, as a member of their 2016 class.

== Undercard ==
Confirmed bouts:

== Broadcasting ==
Country	Broadcaster
Puerto Rico	WAPA-TV
United States	HBO

Preceded by vs. Freddie Roach	Héctor Camacho's bouts 13 June 1983	Succeeded by vs. Cornelius Boza-Edwards
Preceded by vs. Roque Montoya	Edwin Rosario's bouts 13 June 1983	Succeeded by vs. Livingstone Bramble
