= Mario Martínez (boxer) =

Mexican boxer (born 1965)

Personal information
- Nickname: Azabache
- Born: 15 August 1965 (age 61) Guadalajara, Jalisco, Mexico

Boxing career
- Stance: Orthodox

Boxing record
- Total fights: 62
- Wins: 51
- Win by KO: 31
- Losses: 9
- Draws: 2

Mario Martínez, also known as Azabache (born 15 August 1965) is a Mexican former professional boxer best known for losing to Julio César Chávez for the then-vacant WBC Super Featherweight title on 13 September 1984. It is said that such bout catapulted Chavez's career.

== Professional career ==
Mario Martínez became a professional boxer at the age of 16 in his native Guadalajara, Jalisco. He lost one of his early fights against fellow Mexican Rosendo Alonso, but knocked-out Spanish Roberto Castañón and Filipino former world champion Rolando Navarrete in 1984.

His victory against Navarrete earned him a shot against Julio César Chávez for the vacant WBC Super Featherweight title on 13 September 1984. In that fight, staged at the Grand Olympic Auditorium in Los Angeles, California, Chávez knocked him out.

A year later, in 1985, he lost a close split decision to Roger Mayweather. After eight consecutive victories, he challenged Azumah Nelson for the vacant WBC World super featherweight title, but lost by an unpopular split decision. Martinez scored a knockdown in the 10th round and most ringside observers believed he had a decided edge in the contest. In 1989, he faced Nelson in a rematch but lost by 12th round tko. Later on, he was beaten by Jeff Fenech and Dingaan Thobela.

Martínez retired at the age of 31.

== Exhibition boxing record ==
1 fight	0 wins	0 losses
Non-scored	1	

No.	Result	Record	Opponent	Type	Round, time	Date	Location	Notes
1	—N/a	0–0 (1)	Julio César Chávez	—N/a	3	Jul 3, 2015	Culiacán, Mexico	Non-scored bout
