= Andy Holligan =

English boxer (born 1967)

Personal information
- Nationality: English
- Born: Andrew Frederick Holligan; 6 June 1967 (age 59) Liverpool, England
- Height: 5 ft 6 in (1.68 m)
- Weight: light welter/welter/light middleweight

Boxing career

Boxing record
- Total fights: 30
- Wins: 27 (KO 19)
- Losses: 3 (KO 3)

Andy Holligan (born 6 June 1967 in Liverpool) is an English amateur light welterweight and professional light welter/welter/light middleweight boxer of the 1980s and 1990s, who as an amateur won the 1987 Amateur Boxing Association of England (ABAE) light welterweight title, against Rocky Marciano Bryan (Fitzroy Lodge ABC (London)), boxing out of Rotunda ABC (Liverpool), and as a professional won the British Boxing Board of Control (BBBofC) British light welterweight title, winning the Lonsdale Belt outright twice Commonwealth light welterweight title (twice), and was a challenger for the World Boxing Council (WBC) light welterweight title against Julio César Chávez losing the fight after pulling out the fight at the end of the fifth round with a broken nose, and World Boxing Union (WBU) light welterweight title against Shea Neary, his professional fighting weight varied from 139 lb (63 kg; 9 st 13 lb), i.e. light welterweight to 153 lb (69 kg; 10 st 13 lb), i.e. light middleweight.
