= Juan Nazario =

Puerto Rican boxer

Personal information
- Nationality: (Puerto Rico) Puerto Rican
- Born: 27 September 1963 (age 62) Guaynabo, Puerto Rico
- Weight: Lightweight

Boxing career

Boxing record
- Total fights: 29
- Wins: 25
- Win by KO: 17
- Losses: 4

Juan Nazario (born September 27, 1963) is a former professional boxer. During his career, which lasted from 1982 to 1993, Nazario won the WBA world lightweight title. His first world title challenge came in 1987 when he fought fellow Puerto Rican Edwin Rosario for the WBA belt, Rosario won the fight by an eighth round knockout. Nazario and Rosario fought a rematch in 1990, once again for the WBA title. Nazario was able to reverse the result of the first fight by beating Rosario in the eighth round to become champion. In his first defense Nazario challenged Pernell Whitaker for the undisputed title. Whitaker won the fight in the first round and Nazario never fought for a world title again. Nazario fought for a final time on July 10, 1993, beating Angel Cordova by unanimous decision.

== Professional boxing record ==
29 fights	25 wins	4 losses
By knockout	17	3
By decision	8	1

No.	Result	Record	Opponent	Type	Round	Date	Location	Notes
29	Win	25–4	Angel Cordova	UD	10	Jul 10, 1993	Jai Alai Fronton, Miami, Florida, U.S.	
28	Loss	24–4	Silverio Flores	KO	2 (12)	Dec 9, 1992	San Juan, Puerto Rico	For Puerto Rico lightweight title
27	Win	24–3	Kent Hardee	KO	1 (?)	Sep 4, 1992	Isla Verde, Puerto Rico	
26	Win	23–3	Braulio Santiesteban	TD	3 (10)	Jun 13, 1992	Mahi Temple Shrine Auditorium, Miami, Florida, U.S.	
25	Loss	22–3	Pernell Whitaker	KO	1 (12)	Aug 11, 1990	Caesars Tahoe, Outdoor Arena, Stateline, Nevada, U.S.	Lost WBA lightweight title; For WBC and IBF lightweight titles
24	Win	22–2	Edwin Rosario	RTD	8 (12)	Apr 4, 1990	Madison Square Garden, New York City, New York, U.S.	Won WBA lightweight title
23	Win	21–2	Higinio DeLeon	TKO	3 (10)	Oct 21, 1989	Aragon Ballroom, Chicago, Illinois, U.S.	
22	Win	20–2	William Rojas	TKO	6 (10)	Jan 20, 1989	Jai Alai Fronton, Miami, Florida, U.S.	
21	Win	19–2	Billy White	TKO	6 (10)	Oct 1, 1988	International Amphitheatre, Chicago, Illinois, U.S.	
20	Loss	18–2	Edwin Rosario	KO	8 (15)	Aug 11, 1987	UIC Pavilion, Chicago, Illinois, U.S.	For WBA lightweight title
19	Win	18–1	Jose Mosqueda	TKO	4 (10)	Sep 26, 1986	Abel Holtz Stadium, Miami Beach, Florida, U.S.	
18	Win	17–1	Sam Johnson	TKO	3 (?)	Aug 23, 1986	Convention Center, Miami Beach, Florida, U.S.	
17	Win	16–1	Geronimo Emilio Luquez	MD	10	Jun 28, 1985	Tamiami Fairgrounds Auditorium, Miami, Florida, U.S.	
16	Win	15–1	Rosendo Ramirez	TKO	5 (10)	Dec 19, 1984	Riviera Hotel & Casino, Versailles Theatre, Las Vegas, Nevada, U.S.	
15	Win	14–1	Freddy Chumpitaz	PTS	10	Sep 14, 1984	Jai Alai Fronton, Miami, Florida, U.S.	
14	Win	13–1	Carlos Albuerne	TKO	10 (?)	Jun 20, 1984	Coliseo Roberto Clemente, San Juan, Puerto Rico	
13	Win	12–1	Jose Vidal Concepcion	TKO	9 (12)	Mar 17, 1984	Hiram Bithorn Stadium, San Juan, Puerto Rico	Won Latin American super featherweight title
12	Win	11–1	Eduardo Prieto	KO	9 (10)	Feb 3, 1984	Jai Alai Fronton, Miami, Florida, U.S.	
11	Win	10–1	Jose Jimenez	KO	5 (?)	Sep 11, 1983	Port-of-Spain, Trinidad And Tobago	
10	Win	9–1	Sammy Fuentes	KO	5 (?)	Aug 18, 1983	Trujillo Alto, Puerto Rico	
9	Win	8–1	Angel Lopez	PTS	6	May 1, 1983	Coliseo Roberto Clemente, San Juan, Puerto Rico	
8	Win	7–1	Sam Johnson	TKO	3 (?)	Mar 23, 1983	Miami, Florida, U.S.	
7	Win	6–1	David Lopez	TKO	4 (?)	Mar 4, 1983	Willemstad, Curaçao	
6	Loss	5–1	Adriano Arreola	PTS	6	Oct 2, 1982	Showboat Hotel & Casino, Sports Pavilion, Las Vegas, Nevada, U.S.	
5	Win	5–0	Tom Tripp	KO	2 (?)	Sep 13, 1982	Oranjestad, Aruba	
4	Win	4–0	Rafael Pichardo	KO	3 (?)	Aug 21, 1982	San Juan, Puerto Rico	
3	Win	3–0	Jesus Carlos Velez	PTS	4	Jul 24, 1982	San Juan, Puerto Rico	
2	Win	2–0	Roberto Ortiz	PTS	4	May 8, 1982	San Juan, Puerto Rico	
1	Win	1–0	Edgardo Cirino	PTS	4	Apr 17, 1982	San Juan, Puerto Rico	

Achievements
Preceded by Edwin Rosario	WBA lightweight champion April 4, 1990 – August 11, 1990	Succeeded by Pernell Whitaker
