= Edwin Rosario =

Puerto Rican boxer (1963-1997)

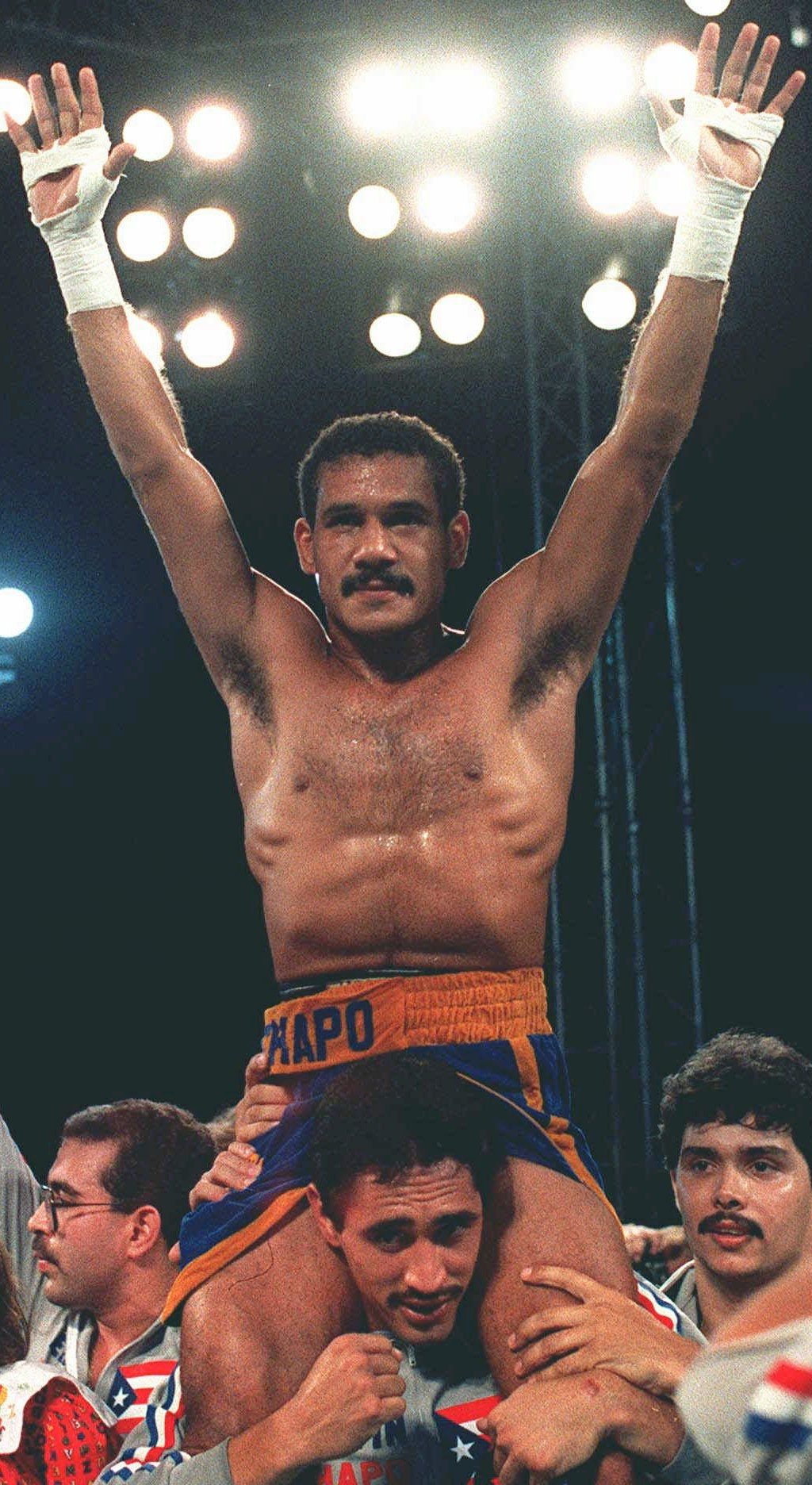
- Rosario in 1986, after winning his fight against Livingstone Bramble

Personal information
- Nickname: Chapo ("Shorty")
- Born: Edwin Rosario; March 15, 1963 Toa Baja, Puerto Rico
- Died: December 1, 1997 (aged 34) Toa Baja, Puerto Rico
- Height: 5 ft 6 in (168 cm)
- Weight: Lightweight; Super lightweight; Welterweight

Boxing career
- Reach: 66 1/2 in (169 cm)
- Stance: Orthodox

Boxing record
- Total fights: 53
- Wins: 47
- Win by KO: 41
- Losses: 6

Edwin "Chapo" Rosario Rivera (Spanish pronunciation: [ˈeðwin roˈsaɾjo]; March 15, 1963 – December 1, 1997) was a Puerto Rican professional boxer who competed from 1979 to 1997. He was a world champion in two weight classes, having held the WBC lightweight title from 1983 to 1984, the WBA lightweight title twice between 1986 and 1990, and the WBA super lightweight title from 1991 to 1992.

Rosario was posthumously inducted into the International Boxing Hall of Fame in 2006.

== Early life and career ==
Edwin Rosario was born in Candelaria barrio, Toa Baja, an extremely poor barrio on the north coast of Puerto Rico. Rosario's older brother Papo became a professional boxer, beginning what looked like a promising career. Edwin and Papo were the sons of Antonio Rosario and Elizabeth Rivera. They also had three sisters.

His boxing manager and coach (trainer), Manny Siaca Sr., had noticed the younger Edwin Rosario's talent when the boy was 8 years old. Inspired by his brother Papo, Chapo Rosario, as he became known in the world of boxing, had a stellar amateur boxing career.

== Professional boxing career ==
Chapo's brother Papo died unexpectedly, purportedly due to drugs, two years after his entry into professional boxing. Rosario persevered, wanting to honor his brother's memory by winning a world championship. He scored big knockout wins over Young Ezzard Charles and Edwin Viruet. He beat Charles in three rounds on the Benitez-Duran undercard in January 1982 in Las Vegas. He also defeated Viruet in three rounds; that opponent had boxed 25 rounds against Roberto Durán-including a world lightweight championship bout-without being knocked out.

Rosario eventually gained a record of 21–0 with 20 knockouts. This led to talks of a title fight against World Boxing Council (WBC) lightweight champion Alexis Argüello, to be held in Miami. But Argüello relinquished the title in order to move up in weight to challenge junior welterweight champion Aaron Pryor.

=== Boxing champion ===
External videos
- You may watch Edwin Rosario vs José Luis Ramírez on YouTube

With Arguello moving divisions, Rosario was matched with Mexico's José Luis Ramírez on May 1, 1983 for the vacant WBC lightweight title. Rosario seemed to have the momentum over the first half of the fight, but tired down the stretch to make for a very close outcome. The judges, as well as most of the public present, felt Rosario had done enough to win. He became world lightweight champion by the unanimous score of 115–113 on all 3 judging cards. Rosario injured his hand during the fight and needed surgery, for which the World Boxing Council gave him a dispensation.

He didn't return to the ring until 1984. In his first defense of the title, he faced Roberto Elizondo, who had lasted 7 rounds with Argüello in a previous world title challenge and was expected to give him a tough fight. Rosario knocked out Elizondo in one round. Howard Davis Jr proved more of a challenge – Davis Jr was ahead on all scorecards with ten seconds remaining in the bout, but was dropped by Rosario for the second time in their fight at that point, and lost a split decision.

A rematch with Ramírez was scheduled, again in San Juan, Puerto Rico, on November 3, 1984. Rosario dropped Ramírez once in round one and again in the second, but the challenger got off the canvas to take Rosario's title away with a fourth-round TKO. This was Rosario's first defeat. Some fans felt he never fully recovered, although he won three more championships.

Rosario won a comeback fight against Frankie Randall, the future world champion, in London. He had to wait another year before an opportunity to regain the title. On June 13, 1986, he met the world champion Hector 'Macho' Camacho at Madison Square Garden in New York. The fight was televised by HBO, and although Rosario shook Camacho badly in the fifth round and rallied down the stretch, Camacho swept the middle rounds. The judges, in a split decision, awarded Camacho the fight.

Because of the closeness of that bout, the WBA gave Rosario a chance to challenge Livingstone Bramble, one of two other world lightweight champions (the other one being the International Boxing Federation's Jimmy Paul). Rosario went to Miami and defeated Bramble by knockout in the second round to become world lightweight champion for the second time. His pose, raising his arms after the fight, became The Ring magazine's cover for the next month — the only time Rosario was featured on its English-version cover.

Rosario defended the WBA lightweight title against fellow Puerto Rican Juan Nazario with a knockout in eight in Chicago.

In Rosario's next defense, he faced WBC super featherweight title holder Julio César Chávez, on November 21, 1987, in Las Vegas. Chavez moved up in weight to challenge for Rosario's title, and he battered the lightweight champion. By the tenth round, Rosario's left eye was completely shut. His right eye was swollen, and he was bleeding from the nose and mouth. Referee Richard Steele stopped the fight at 2:38 of the eleventh round at the request of Rosario's corner. At the time of the stoppage, Rosario trailed on the judges' scorecards by the following scores: Jerry Roth: 98-92. Bob Watson: 99-91. Albert Tramari 100-92 (2 rounds even).

Rosario was inactive for seven months then went 7–0 with 6 KO's in his next fights. After Chavez vacated the title in 1989, Rosario came back and won it again, beating Anthony Jones, a tough Kronk prospect for the championship.

Rosario joined a small group of men who had become world champions three times in the same division. This time, however, he didn't hold the title for long. When he gave Nazario a 1990 rematch at Madison Square Garden, he was defeated on cuts in the 8th round.

Rosario moved up a weight class to the junior welterweight division, and defeated defending world champion Loreto Garza in three rounds in Sacramento's Arco Arena to become a world champion for the 4th time.

However, personal problems started to take their toll. In his first defense, against Japanese Akinobu Hiranaka in Mexico City on April 10, 1992, he lost by a 1st-round TKO. He later lost a rematch to Frankie Randall, by technical knockout in seven rounds.

== Later career and death ==
Rosario disappeared from the boxing scene. Years later he received media attention after being arrested for stealing beer from a supermarket. He vowed to stay clean and went into a program to achieve this.

In 1997, he won two comeback fights, then won the Caribbean welterweight title by beating Roger Benito Flores of Nicaragua in Bayamón, Puerto Rico, in a twelve-round decision. Once an HBO staple, Rosario was then fighting on small cards without any TV showings. He was ranked #10 among Oscar De La Hoya's challengers at the welterweight division after his win over Flores, making him an official world title challenger once again.

He defeated Sanford Ricks at Madison Square Garden. In his final fight on September 25, 1997, Rosario knocked out Harold Bennett in two rounds at Bayamon. He died before fighting again.

On December 1, 1997, Rosario visited the home of his ex-wife and four daughters, but he cut his visit short an hour later, saying he felt ill. After returning home where he lived with his parents, Rosario was later found dead in his bed by his father. He was found to have died of an aneurysm on December 1, 1997, with fluid accumulated in the lungs. Doctors said that his history of narcotics and alcohol abuse was a factor.

Many celebrities and dignitaries attended his funeral, and a group of Puerto Rican world boxing champions were among the pallbearers. More than 5,000 people came to the funeral or watched from their homes as the coffin was driven from the funeral home to the cemetery.

== Professional boxing record ==
53 fights	47 wins	6 losses
By knockout	40	5
By decision	6	1
By disqualification	1	0

No.	Result	Record	Opponent	Type	Round, time	Date	Age	Location	Notes
53	Win	47–6	Harold Bennett	KO	2 (10)	Sep 25, 1997	34 years, 194 days	Bayamon, Puerto Rico	
52	Win	46–6	Sanford Ricks	KO	8 (8), 0:31	Aug 23, 1997	34 years, 161 days	Madison Square Garden, New York City, New York, US	
51	Win	45–6	Roger Flores	PTS	12	Jul 17, 1997	34 years, 124 days	Bayamon, Puerto Rico	Won WBA Fedecentro welterweight title
50	Win	44–6	Calvin Moody	DQ	3 (8), 1:09	Jun 7, 1997	34 years, 84 days	Mahi Temple Shrine Auditorium, Miami, Florida, US	Moody was DQ'd for holding
49	Win	43–6	Maurice Roberson	TKO	4 (10), 2:02	May 22, 1997	34 years, 68 days	Bayamon, Puerto Rico	
48	Loss	42–6	Frankie Randall	TKO	7 (10), 2:03	Jan 30, 1993	29 years, 321 days	The Pyramid, Memphis, Tennessee, US	
47	Win	42–5	George Kellman	TKO	5 (10)	Aug 11, 1993	30 years, 149 days	San Juan, Puerto Rico	
46	Loss	41–5	Akinobu Hiranaka	TKO	1 (12), 1:32	Apr 10, 1992	29 years, 26 days	El Toreo de Cuatro Caminos, Mexico City, Mexico	Lost WBA super lightweight title
45	Win	41–4	Loreto Garza	TKO	3 (12), 1:09	Jun 14, 1991	28 years, 91 days	Arco Arena, Sacramento, California, US	Won WBA super lightweight title
44	Win	40–4	Dwayne Swift	MD	10	Aug 23, 1990	27 years, 161 days	Villa Roma Resort, Callicoon, New York, US	
43	Loss	39–4	Juan Nazario	RTD	8 (12), 3:00	Apr 4, 1990	27 years, 20 days	Madison Square Garden, New York City, New York, US	Lost WBA lightweight title
42	Win	39–3	Anthony Jones	TKO	6 (12), 2:00	Jul 9, 1989	26 years, 116 days	Showboat Hotel & Casino, Atlantic City, New Jersey, US	Won vacant WBA lightweight title
41	Win	38–3	Larry Benson	RTD	5 (10)	Mar 16, 1989	26 years, 1 day	Felt Forum, New York City, New York, US	
40	Win	37–3	Jesus Gallardo	TKO	8 (10), 1:26	Feb 9, 1989	25 years, 331 days	Felt Forum, New York City, New York, US	
39	Win	36–3	Juan Minaya	KO	4 (10), 1:44	Oct 27, 1988	25 years, 226 days	Felt Forum, New York City, New York, US	
38	Win	35–3	Felipe Angulo	TKO	2 (10)	Sep 3, 1988	25 years, 172 days	Harrah's Marina Hotel Casino, Atlantic City, New Jersey, US	
37	Win	34–3	Rafael Gandarilla	TKO	3 (10), 1:19	Aug 11, 1988	25 years, 149 days	Felt Forum, New York City, New York, US	
36	Win	33–3	Javier Cerna	KO	1 (10), 2:40	Jul 31, 1988	25 years, 138 days	Felt Forum, New York City, New York, US	
35	Win	32–3	Ramiro Lozano	TKO	3 (10)	Jun 2, 1988	25 years, 79 days	Felt Forum, New York City, New York, US	
34	Loss	31–3	Julio César Chávez	TKO	11 (12), 2:43	Nov 21, 1987	24 years, 251 days	Las Vegas Hilton, Outdoor Arena, Las Vegas, Nevada, US	Lost WBA lightweight title
33	Win	31–2	Juan Nazario	KO	8 (15), 2:43	Aug 11, 1987	24 years, 149 days	UIC Pavilion, Chicago, Illinois, US	Retained WBA lightweight title
32	Win	30–2	Roger Brown	KO	2 (10), 0:36	Mar 7, 1987	23 years, 357 days	Las Vegas Hilton, Outdoor Arena, Las Vegas, Nevada, US	
31	Win	29–2	Livingstone Bramble	KO	2 (15), 2:28	Sep 26, 1986	23 years, 195 days	Abel Holtz Stadium, Miami Beach, Florida, US	Won WBA lightweight title
30	Loss	28–2	Hector Camacho	SD	12	Jun 13, 1986	23 years, 90 days	Madison Square Garden, New York City, New York, US	For WBC lightweight title
29	Win	28–1	Roque Montoya	KO	7 (10), 1:25	Dec 27, 1985	22 years, 287 days	Latham Coliseum, Latham, New York, US	
28	Win	27–1	Frankie Randall	PTS	10	Jun 16, 1985	22 years, 93 days	York Hall, Bethnal Green, London, England, UK	
27	Win	26–1	Alberto Ramos	KO	2 (10), 1:08	Apr 15, 1985	22 years, 31 days	Madison Square Garden, New York City, New York, US	
26	Win	25–1	Eduardo Valdez	TKO	3 (10), 1:36	Mar 13, 1985	21 years, 363 days	Harrah's Marina Hotel Casino, Atlantic City, New Jersey, US	
25	Loss	24–1	José Luis Ramírez	TKO	4 (12), 2:52	Nov 3, 1984	21 years, 233 days	Hiram Bithorn Stadium, San Juan, Puerto Rico	Lost WBC lightweight title
24	Win	24–0	Howard Davis Jr.	SD	12	Jun 23, 1984	21 years, 100 days	Coliseo Roberto Clemente, San Juan, Puerto Rico	Retained WBC lightweight title
23	Win	23–0	Roberto Elizondo	TKO	1 (12), 1:57	Mar 17, 1984	21 years, 2 days	Hiram Bithorn Stadium, San Juan, Puerto Rico	Retained WBC lightweight title
22	Win	22–0	José Luis Ramírez	UD	12	May 1, 1983	20 years, 47 days	Coliseo Roberto Clemente, San Juan, Puerto Rico	Won vacant WBC lightweight title
21	Win	21–0	Edwin Viruet	TKO	3 (10), 1:37	May 30, 1982	19 years, 76 days	The Aladdin, Las Vegas, Nevada, US	
20	Win	20–0	Dennis Quimayousie	TKO	1 (10), 1:52	Mar 21, 1982	19 years, 6 days	Showboat Hotel & Casino, Las Vegas, Nevada, US	
19	Win	19–0	Ezzard Charles Adams	KO	3 (10), 2:07	Jan 30, 1982	18 years, 321 days	Caesars Palace, Las Vegas, Nevada, US	
18	Win	18–0	Ernesto Herrera	KO	3 (10), 2:02	Dec 10, 1981	18 years, 270 days	Curtis Hixon Hall, Tampa, Florida, US	
17	Win	17–0	Roberto Garcia	KO	2 (10), 1:45	Nov 14, 1981	18 years, 244 days	Caesars Palace, Outdoor Arena, Las Vegas, Nevada, US	
16	Win	16–0	James Martinez	UD	10	Sep 16, 1981	18 years, 185 days	Caesars Palace, Outdoor Arena, Las Vegas, Nevada, US	
15	Win	15–0	Rodrigo Aguirre	KO	8 (10), 2:38	Jul 18, 1981	18 years, 125 days	Sun Dome, Tampa, Florida, US	
14	Win	14–0	Refugio Rojas	KO	2 (10), 1:47	Jun 25, 1981	18 years, 102 days	Madison Square Garden, New York City, New York, US	
13	Win	13–0	Jose Resendez	TKO	6 (8), 2:09	May 23, 1981	18 years, 69 days	Caesars Palace, Las Vegas, Nevada, US	
12	Win	12–0	Tony Tris	TKO	4 (10)	Apr 10, 1981	18 years, 26 days	Felt Forum, New York City, New York, US	
11	Win	11–0	Javier Flores	TKO	9 (10), 2:56	Aug 22, 1980	17 years, 160 days	Caesars Palace, Sports Pavilion, Las Vegas, Nevada, US	
10	Win	10–0	Jose Luis Lara	TKO	2 (10)	Jul 7, 1980	17 years, 114 days	Metropolitan Sports Center, Bloomington, Minnesota, US	
9	Win	9–0	Pascual Polanco	TKO	4 (10)	Mar 10, 1980	16 years, 361 days	San Juan, Puerto Rico	
8	Win	8–0	Leopoldo Frias	KO	2 (8)	Feb 18, 1980	16 years, 340 days	Coliseo Roberto Clemente, San Juan, Puerto Rico	
7	Win	7–0	Pancho Muletta	KO	2 (8)	Sep 22, 1979	16 years, 191 days	San Juan, Puerto Rico	
6	Win	6–0	James Sowell	KO	2 (8)	Aug 1, 1979	16 years, 139 days	Shrine Exposition Center, Los Angeles, California, US	
5	Win	5–0	Jose Villegas	RTD	5 (8)	Jul 20, 1979	16 years, 127 days	Coliseum, San Diego, California, US	
4	Win	4–0	Julio Miranda	KO	4 (8)	May 12, 1979	16 years, 58 days	Santo Domingo, Dominican Republic	
3	Win	3–0	Enrique Maldonado	KO	3 (8)	Mar 27, 1979	16 years, 12 days	Santo Domingo, Dominican Republic	
2	Win	2–0	Juan Caro	KO	1 (8)	Mar 4, 1979	15 years, 354 days	Santo Domingo, Dominican Republic	
1	Win	1–0	Jorge Ortega	KO	2 (8)	Mar 3, 1979	15 years, 353 days	Santo Domingo, Dominican Republic	

== Titles in boxing ==
=== Major world titles ===
- WBA lightweight champion (135 lbs) (2x)
- WBC lightweight champion (135 lbs)
- WBA super lightweight champion (140 lbs)

=== Regional/International titles ===
- WBA Fedecentro welterweight champion (147 lbs)

== Legacy and honors ==
- He won three world championships in the same division.
- On January 12, 2006, Rosario was inducted into the International Boxing Hall of Fame, the sixth Puerto Rican inducted into the hall.
- According to Ring Magazine, Edwin Rosario ranks #36 on the list of "100 Greatest Punchers of All Time."

== See also ==
- List of world lightweight boxing champions
- List of world light-welterweight boxing champions
- List of Puerto Rican boxing world champions
- Sports in Puerto Rico
- List of Puerto Ricans

Sporting positions
Regional boxing titles
Vacant Title last held by Jose Rivera	WBA Fedecentro welterweight champion July 17, 1997 – December 1, 1997; Died	Vacant Title next held by Humberto Aranda
World boxing titles
Vacant Title last held by Alexis Argüello	WBC lightweight champion May 1, 1983 – November 3, 1984	Succeeded by José Luis Ramírez
Preceded by Livingstone Bramble	WBA lightweight champion September 26, 1986 – November 21, 1987	Succeeded by Julio César Chávez
Vacant Title last held by Julio César Chávez	WBA lightweight champion July 9, 1989 – April 4, 1990	Succeeded by Juan Nazario
Preceded by Loreto Garza	WBA super lightweight champion June 14, 1991 – April 10, 1992	Succeeded by Akinobu Hiranaka
