= Shea Neary =

British boxer

Personal information
- Nickname: The Shamrock Express
- Nationality: British
- Born: James Patrick Neary; 18 May 1968 (age 58) Kensington, Liverpool, Lancashire, England
- Height: 5 ft 7 1/2 in (171 cm)
- Weight: Light-welterweight

Boxing career
- Reach: 71 in (180 cm)
- Stance: Orthodox

Boxing record
- Total fights: 25
- Wins: 23
- Win by KO: 16
- Losses: 2

James Patrick "Shea" Neary (/ˈʃeɪ ˈnɪəri/ shay NEER-ee; born 18 May 1968) is a British former professional boxer who competed from 1992 to 2000. He held the WBU light-welterweight title from 1996 to 2000, and challenged once for the Commonwealth light-welterweight title in the latter year.

== Amateur career ==
Neary fought as an amateur from the age of 15, compiling a record of 21 fights and 3 losses.

== Professional career ==
Neary made his professional debut on 3 September 1992, defeating fellow debutant Simon Ford by knockout in the first round. On 8 September 1995, Neary won his first regional championship—the vacant British Central Area title—by knocking out Nigel Bradley in two rounds. Three fights later, on 26 October 1996, Neary scored a twelve-round unanimous decision over Darryl Tyson to win the vacant WBU light-welterweight title. He made five successful defences of the title, all televised nationally on ITV's The Big Fight Live. One of these defences included a sixth-round stoppage over former British light-welterweight champion Andy Holligan on 12 March 1998.

On 11 March 2000, Neary fought Micky Ward as part of the undercard to Naseem Hamed vs. Vuyani Bungu. This brought Neary international exposure for the first time, as the event was televised in the United States by HBO on their World Championship Boxing series. In a high-paced, action-packed slugfest, Ward handed Neary his first loss by stopping him in the eighth round. The fight was dramatised in the 2010 film The Fighter, with Anthony Molinari playing the part of Neary.

Neary won one more fight on 25 July 2000, scoring a ten-round points decision over Alan Bosworth. However, Neary had struggled to make weight before the fight, and was quoted as having lacked motivation coming in. On 11 November 2000, in what would be Neary's final fight, he lost via points decision to then-reigning Commonwealth light-welterweight champion Eamonn Magee. The result, judged by referee Roy Francis, was viewed as controversial.

== Personal life ==
Neary's father moved from Ireland to Liverpool in the 1940s, and during his career Neary was embraced as both an Irishman and a Scouser. On 2 May 2011, Neary was arrested following a brawl at the Revolution bar in Albert Dock, Liverpool, but was later cleared of assault charges in December.

Neary's son James Metcalf, nicknamed "Kid Shamrock", became a professional boxer in 2011 and competes as a light-middleweight. He has called his father "a huge inspiration growing up", and the reason he wanted to be a boxer.

== Professional boxing record ==
25 fights	23 wins	2 losses
By knockout	16	1
By decision	7	1

No.	Result	Record	Opponent	Type	Round, time	Date	Location	Notes
25	Loss	23–2	Eamonn Magee	PTS	12	11 Nov 2000	Waterfront Hall, Belfast, Northern Ireland	For Commonwealth light-welterweight title
24	Win	23–1	Alan Bosworth	PTS	10	25 Jul 2000	Elephant and Castle Shopping Centre, London, England	
23	Loss	22–1	Micky Ward	TKO	8 (12), 2:55	11 Mar 2000	London Olympia, London, England	Lost WBU light-welterweight title
22	Win	22–0	Mike Griffith	TKO	4 (12), 2:49	19 Jun 1999	National Stadium, Dublin, Ireland	Retained WBU light-welterweight title
21	Win	21–0	Juan Carlos Ceferino Villarreal	UD	12	24 Oct 1998	St George's Hall, Liverpool, England	Retained WBU light-welterweight title
20	Win	20–0	Naas Scheepers	UD	12	21 Jul 1998	Kingsway Leisure Centre, Widnes, England	Retained WBU light-welterweight title
19	Win	19–0	Andy Holligan	TKO	6 (12), 2:42	12 Mar 1998	Stanley Park, Liverpool, England	Retained WBU light-welterweight title
18	Win	18–0	Jeremiah Malinga	KO	3 (12), 3:04	1 Mar 1997	Everton Park Sports Centre, Liverpool, England	Retained WBU light-welterweight title
17	Win	17–0	Darryl Tyson	UD	12	26 Oct 1996	Everton Park Sports Centre, Liverpool, England	Won vacant WBU light-welterweight title
16	Win	16–0	Terry Southerland	KO	2 (8), 2:48	3 Feb 1996	Everton Park Sports Centre, Liverpool, England	
15	Win	15–0	Mark Richardson	KO	1 (8)	24 Nov 1995	Bowlers Exhibition Centre, Manchester, England	
14	Win	14–0	Nigel Bradley	KO	2 (10)	8 Sep 1995	Everton Park Sports Centre, Liverpool, England	Won vacant Central Area light-welterweight title
13	Win	13–0	Hugh Forde	RTD	6 (8), 3:00	16 Jun 1995	Everton Park Sports Centre, Liverpool, England	
12	Win	12–0	Tony Swift	TKO	3 (8)	15 Mar 1995	Moat House, Stoke-on-Trent, England	
11	Win	11–0	John Smith	TKO	5 (8), 0:12	25 Jan 1995	European Sporting Club, Stoke-on-Trent, England	
10	Win	10–0	Tony Foster	KO	2 (6)	7 Dec 1994	Trentham Gardens, Stoke-on-Trent, England	
9	Win	9–0	Mark Pearce	KO	4 (6)	13 Jun 1994	Devonshire House Hotel, Liverpool, England	
8	Win	8–0	Mark Antony	KO	1 (6)	25 Oct 1993	Devonshire House Hotel, Liverpool, England	
7	Win	7–0	Wayne Shepherd	TD	2 (6)	6 Sep 1993	Devonshire House Hotel, Liverpool, England	
6	Win	6–0	John Smith	PTS	6	29 Mar 1993	Devonshire House Hotel, Liverpool, England	
5	Win	5–0	Vaughan Carnegie	KO	1 (6)	22 Feb 1993	Devonshire House Hotel, Liverpool, England	
4	Win	4–0	Chris Saunders	PTS	6	1 Dec 1992	Everton Park Sports Centre, Liverpool, England	
3	Win	3–0	Jason Barker	TKO	3 (6)	2 Nov 1992	Devonshire House Hotel, Liverpool, England	
2	Win	2–0	Shaun Armstrong	TKO	6 (6)	5 Oct 1992	Devonshire House Hotel, Liverpool, England	
1	Win	1–0	Simon Ford	KO	1 (6)	3 Sep 1992	Everton Park Sports Centre, Liverpool, England	

Sporting positions
Regional boxing titles
Vacant Title last held by Richard Burton	Central Area light-welterweight champion 8 September 1995 – October 1996; Vacated	Vacant Title next held by Wayne Windle
Minor world boxing titles
Vacant Title last held by Joey Gamache	WBU light-welterweight champion 26 October 1996 – 11 March 2000	Succeeded by Micky Ward
