= José Luis Ramírez =

Mexican boxer

Personal information
- Nickname: El Zurdo
- Born: December 3, 1958 (age 67) Huatabampo, Sonora, Mexico
- Height: 5 ft 6 1/2 in (169 cm)
- Weight: Lightweight; Light welterweight

Boxing career
- Reach: 64 in (163 cm)
- Stance: Southpaw

Boxing record
- Total fights: 111
- Wins: 102
- Win by KO: 82
- Losses: 9

José Luis Ramírez (born December 3, 1958) is a Mexican former professional boxer who was a two-time World Lightweight Champion. His most notable fights include two bouts each with Edwin Rosario and Pernell Whitaker, as well as fights against Ruben Olivares, Alexis Arguello, Ray Mancini, Hector Camacho, Julio Cesar Chavez and Juan Martin Coggi.

== Career ==
A native of Huatabampo, Sonora and a resident of Culiacán, Ramírez made his professional debut on March 25, 1973 at the age of 14. He climbed slowly but steadily on boxing's rankings. In 1978, as a Featherweight, a 19 year old Ramírez lost by knockout for the only time in his career to legendary three time former world champion Rubén Olivares in two rounds.

After his move in weight to the Lightweights, 21-year-old Ramírez accumulated a record of 67-2, and met another boxing legend inside the ring, when he fought Alexis Argüello. Ramírez dropped Argüello for the first time in his career in round six, but lost a disputed ten round split decision in Miami. He then faced Ray Mancini for the North American Lightweight belt, and lost a 12 round decision in Ohio. By then, Ramírez and Julio César Chávez were gymmates and friends.

Ramírez won his following 10 bouts and on May 1, 1983, he was given the chance at becoming world Lightweight champion for the first time, when he fought Puerto Rican Edwin "El Chapo" Rosario at the Coliseo Roberto Clemente in San Juan, Puerto Rico, for the World Boxing Council's championship. Ramírez lost a close 12 round unanimous decision, but on November 3, of 1984, he and Rosario had a rematch, also in San Juan. After rising from two knockdowns, Ramírez rallied back to stagger Rosario in the third round. With Rosario pinned against a corner and Ramírez attacking, referee Steve Crosson stopped the bout in round four, after Ramírez had landed 17 straight punches, making Ramírez a world Lightweight champion for the first time, by a technical knockout. The fight was named the 1984 Ring Magazine fight of the year.

Ramírez then went into training for a defense against Héctor Camacho, another boxer from Puerto Rico. The fight was postponed when Camacho suffered a broken ankle during a pick up basketball game, but it finally came off on August 10, 1985. On his first fight telecast on HBO Boxing, Ramírez was dropped in round three and lost a 12 round unanimous decision.

Ramírez moved to Paris soon after. There, he re-grouped, and was able to regain the WBC's world championship when Camacho left it vacant in 1987, by edging out Terrence Alli with another close but unanimous 12 round decision. In his first title defense, he defeated former champion Cornelius Boza-Edwards by fifth round knock out. In his second defense, he was awarded a 12 round split decision victory against future multiple world champion Pernell Whitaker. The consensus among both United States media and US fans was that Whitaker deserved to win the fight.

Back in Mexico, he and Chávez were neighbors. Chávez had lifted the World Boxing Association's world Lightweight championship by beating Rosario, and a unification bout between the two friends and neighbors was planned. Ramírez, who is a godfather to one of Chávez's sons, lost an 11 round technical decision to Chávez on October 29 of 1988, which marked the last day he would be a world champion.

In 1989, he tried to win the International Boxing Federation's belt from Whitaker, in Virginia, but he lost a 12 round decision. Then, in 1990, he returned to France, where he lost to Juan Martin Coggi by a decision in 12 for the WBA's world Jr. Welterweight title in Ajaccio. After that bout, he retired.

Ramírez was a member of the less recognized, defunct World Boxing Hall of Fame in California, not to be confused with the more widely recognized International Boxing Hall of Fame in Canastota. In 2003, Ring magazine placed Ramirez on their list of the 100 greatest punchers of all time.

His boxing record is 102–9 (82 KOs). Seven of Ramirez's nine career losses came against future Hall Of Fame members.

== Professional boxing record ==
111 fights	102 wins	9 losses
By knockout	82	1
By decision	19	8
By disqualification	1	0

No.	Result	Record	Opponent	Type	Round, time	Date	Age	Location	Notes
111	Loss	102–9	Martín Coggi	UD	12	Mar 24, 1990	31 years, 111 days	Ajaccio, France	For WBA light welterweight title
110	Loss	102–8	Pernell Whitaker	UD	12	Aug 20, 1989	30 years, 260 days	Scope Arena, Norfolk, Virginia, U.S.	For IBF lightweight title; & vacant WBC, The Ring lightweight titles
109	Win	102–7	Juan Minaya	DQ	5 (8)	Mar 10, 1989	30 years, 97 days	Palais des Sports de Beaublanc, Limoges, France	
108	Loss	101–7	Julio César Chávez	TD	11 (12), 0:54	Oct 29, 1988	29 years, 331 days	Las Vegas Hilton, Winchester, Nevada, U.S.	Lost WBC lightweight title; For WBA and vacant The Ring lightweight title
107	Win	101–6	Pernell Whitaker	SD	12	Mar 12, 1988	29 years, 100 days	Stade de Levallois, Levallois-Perret, France	Retained WBC lightweight title
106	Win	100–6	John Rafuse	TKO	4 (?)	Dec 19, 1987	29 years, 16 days	Palais Omnisport de Paris-Bercy, Bercy, France	
105	Win	99–6	Cornelius Boza-Edwards	KO	5 (12)	Oct 10, 1987	28 years, 311 days	Zenith Palais, Paris, France	Retained WBC lightweight title
104	Win	98–6	Terrence Alli	UD	12	Jul 19, 1987	28 years, 228 days	Saint-Tropez, France	Won vacant WBC lightweight title
103	Win	97–6	Steve Mitchell	KO	5 (?)	May 25, 1987	28 years, 173 days	Villeurbanne, France	
102	Win	96–6	Roger Brown	TKO	7 (?)	May 12, 1987	28 years, 160 days	Le Mans, France	
101	Win	95–6	David Taylor	PTS	10	Apr 16, 1987	28 years, 134 days	Marseille, France	
100	Win	94–6	Efrain Nieves	TKO	3 (?)	Mar 27, 1987	28 years, 114 days	Palais des Festivals, Cannes, France	
99	Win	93–6	John Sinegal	TKO	2 (?)	Dec 8, 1986	28 years, 5 days	Usines Center, Paris, France	
98	Win	92–6	Charlie Brown	UD	10	Oct 25, 1986	27 years, 326 days	Zenith Palais, Paris, France	
97	Win	91–6	Nick Parker	TKO	6 (?)	Sep 15, 1986	27 years, 286 days	Paris, France	
96	Loss	90–6	Héctor Camacho	UD	12	Aug 10, 1985	26 years, 250 days	Riviera Hotel & Casino, Winchester, Nevada, U.S.	Lost WBC lightweight title
95	Win	90–5	Manuel Hernandez	UD	10	Jun 6, 1985	26 years, 185 days	Riviera Hotel & Casino, Winchester, Nevada, U.S.	
94	Win	89–5	J.T. Walker	TKO	4 (10), 2:59	Mar 13, 1985	26 years, 100 days	Civic Auditorium, San Jose, California, U.S.	
93	Win	88–5	Edwin Rosario	TKO	4 (12), 2:52	Nov 3, 1984	25 years, 336 days	Hiram Bithorn Stadium, San Juan, Puerto Rico	Won WBC lightweight title
92	Win	87–5	Martin Quiroz	UD	10	Jun 2, 1984	25 years, 182 days	Coliseum Arena, Oakland, California, U.S.	
91	Win	86–5	Hector Medina	TKO	4 (?)	May 11, 1984	25 years, 160 days	Mazatlan, Sinaloa, Mexico	
90	Win	85–5	Victor Kelly	TKO	3 (?)	Dec 30, 1983	25 years, 27 days	Mazatlan, Sinaloa, Mexico	
89	Win	84–5	Manuel Sanchez	TKO	3 (?)	Nov 4, 1983	24 years, 336 days	Arena Naucalpan, Naucalpan, México, Mexico	
88	Win	83–5	Joe Gallardo	KO	2 (?)	Oct 7, 1983	24 years, 308 days	Guaymas, Sonora, Mexico	
87	Loss	82–5	Edwin Rosario	UD	12	May 1, 1983	24 years, 149 days	Roberto Clemente Coliseum, San Juan, Puerto Rico	For vacant WBC lightweight title
86	Win	82–4	Jose Cebreros	KO	3 (?)	Feb 26, 1983	24 years, 85 days	San Juan, Puerto Rico	
85	Win	81–4	Frankie Moultrie	KO	3 (12), 2:18	Nov 26, 1982	23 years, 358 days	Astrodome, Houston, Texas, U.S.	Won vacant NABF lightweight title
84	Win	80–4	Ramon Avitia	KO	6 (12)	Oct 23, 1982	23 years, 324 days	Tijuana, Baja California, Mexico	Retained Mexican lightweight title
83	Win	79–4	Francisco Delgado	KO	4 (?)	Oct 1, 1982	23 years, 302 days	Hermosillo, Sonora, Mexico	
82	Win	78–4	Rigoberto Ruiz	KO	5 (10)	Sep 10, 1982	23 years, 281 days	Municipal Stadium, San Jose, California, U.S.	
81	Win	77–4	Ernesto Herrera	TKO	4 (?)	Aug 28, 1982	23 years, 268 days	Ciudad Obregon, Sonora, Mexico	
80	Win	76–4	Ricardo Peralta	TKO	6 (12), 2:25	Jun 25, 1982	23 years, 204 days	Municipal Stadium, San Jose, California, U.S.	Retained Mexican lightweight title
79	Win	75–4	Jorge Morales	PTS	10	May 8, 1982	23 years, 156 days	Municipal Stadium, San Jose, California, U.S.	
78	Win	74–4	Benjamin Abarca	KO	3 (12)	Mar 19, 1982	23 years, 106 days	Culiacan, Sinaloa, Mexico	Retained Mexican lightweight title
77	Win	73–4	Benjamin Abarca	KO	6 (12)	Oct 23, 1981	22 years, 324 days	Tuxtla Gutierrez, Chiapas, Mexico	Retained Mexican lightweight title
76	Win	72–4	Jose Luis Soberanes	PTS	10	Aug 28, 1981	22 years, 268 days	Navojoa, Sonora, Mexico	
75	Loss	71–4	Ray Mancini	UD	12	Jul 19, 1981	22 years, 228 days	Packard Music Hall, Warren, Ohio, U.S.	For NABF lightweight title
74	Win	71–3	Ezequiel Cocoa Sanchez	UD	10	May 10, 1981	22 years, 158 days	Great Western Forum, Inglewood, California, U.S.	
73	Win	70–3	Celso Limon	KO	1 (?)	Apr 9, 1981	22 years, 127 days	Hermosillo, Sonora, Mexico	
72	Win	69–3	Abdul Bey	KO	3 (?)	Feb 27, 1981	22 years, 86 days	Huatabampo, Sonora, Mexico	
71	Win	68–3	Ernesto Garfias	TKO	7 (10)	Feb 7, 1981	22 years, 66 days	Olympic Auditorium, Los Angeles, California, U.S.	
70	Loss	67–3	Alexis Argüello	SD	10	Nov 14, 1980	21 years, 347 days	Jai Alai Fronton, Miami, Florida, U.S.	
69	Win	67–2	Vicente Mijares	TKO	6 (12)	Oct 11, 1980	21 years, 313 days	Mexico City, Distrito Federal, Mexico	Retained Mexico lightweight title
68	Win	66–2	Dario De Jesus	TKO	1 (10)	Aug 23, 1980	21 years, 264 days	Great Western Forum, Inglewood, California, U.S.	
67	Win	65–2	Manuel Sanchez	TKO	6 (?)	Aug 10, 1980	21 years, 251 days	Huatabampo, Sonora, Mexico	
66	Win	64–2	Jesus Cuate Lara	KO	7 (10)	Jul 10, 1980	21 years, 220 days	Navojoa, Sonora, Mexico	
65	Win	63–2	Rafael Nunez	KO	1 (10)	Jun 19, 1980	21 years, 199 days	Memorial Fieldhouse, Tacoma, Washington, U.S.	
64	Win	62–2	German Cuello	KO	8 (?)	Mar 21, 1980	21 years, 109 days	Great Western Forum, Inglewood, California, U.S.	
63	Win	61–2	Jose Torres	KO	5 (10)	Feb 3, 1980	21 years, 16 days	Gimnasio, Mexicali, Baja California, Mexico	
62	Win	60–2	Eric Bonilla	TKO	4 (?)	Dec 19, 1979	21 years, 16 days	Ciudad Obregon, Sonora, Mexico	
61	Win	59–2	Ignacio Campos	TKO	12 (12)	Nov 26, 1979	20 years, 358 days	Arena Tijuana 72, Tijuana, Baja California, Mexico	Retained Mexican lightweight title
60	Win	58–2	Joe Gallardo	KO	4 (?)	Nov 11, 1979	20 years, 343 days	Huatabampo, Sonora, Mexico	
59	Win	57–2	Jose Luis Castillo	PTS	12	Sep 28, 1979	20 years, 299 days	Ciudad Obregon, Sonora, Mexico	Retained Mexican lightweight title
58	Win	56–2	Ignacio Campos	TKO	7 (10)	Aug 20, 1979	20 years, 260 days	Arena Tijuana 72, Tijuana, Baja California, Mexico	
57	Win	55–2	Antonio Nava	PTS	10	Jul 27, 1979	20 years, 236 days	Ciudad Obregon, Sonora, Mexico	
56	Win	54–2	Adrian Estrella	KO	7 (?)	Jul 8, 1979	20 years, 217 days	Huatabampo, Sonora, Mexico	
55	Win	53–2	Humberto Gutiérrez	KO	9 (12)	Jun 15, 1979	20 years, 194 days	Ciudad Obregon, Sonora, Mexico	Won vacant Mexican lightweight title
54	Win	52–2	Saul Montana	KO	7 (?)	Apr 6, 1979	20 years, 124 days	Guaymas, Sonora, Mexico	
53	Win	51–2	Julio Nava	KO	3 (?)	Mar 7, 1979	20 years, 94 days	Hermosillo, Sonora, Mexico	
52	Win	50–2	Aurelio Muniz	TKO	9 (10)	Feb 2, 1979	20 years, 61 days	Ciudad Obregon, Sonora, Mexico	
51	Win	49–2	Cesar Savinon	TKO	2 (?)	Dec 1, 1978	19 years, 363 days	Ciudad Obregon, Sonora, Mexico	
50	Win	48–2	David Bernal	KO	3 (10)	Oct 20, 1978	19 years, 321 days	Auditorio Municipal, Tijuana, Baja California, Mexico	
49	Win	47–2	Leonardo Bermudez	PTS	10	Sep 1, 1978	19 years, 272 days	Ciudad Obregon, Sonora, Mexico	
48	Win	46–2	Salvador Torres	TKO	3 (?)	Jul 21, 1978	19 years, 230 days	Ciudad Obregon, Sonora, Mexico	
47	Win	45–2	Bobo Gonzalez	KO	2 (?)	Jul 7, 1978	19 years, 216 days	Huatabampo, Sonora, Mexico	
46	Win	44–2	Chito Felix	KO	3 (?)	Jun 23, 1978	19 years, 202 days	Huatabampo, Sonora, Mexico	
45	Loss	43–2	Rubén Olivares	TKO	2 (10)	Apr 28, 1978	19 years, 146 days	Arena, Ciudad Obregon, Sonora, Mexico	
44	Win	43–1	Ramon Peraza	KO	3 (?)	Feb 17, 1978	19 years, 76 days	Ciudad Obregon, Sonora, Mexico	
43	Win	42–1	Henry Jacobo	KO	4 (?)	Feb 3, 1978	19 years, 62 days	Ciudad Obregon, Sonora, Mexico	
42	Win	41–1	Joe Gallardo	KO	7 (?)	Jan 7, 1978	19 years, 35 days	La Paz, Baja California Sur, Mexico	
41	Win	40–1	Camilo Ibarra	KO	7 (?)	Dec 7, 1977	19 years, 4 days	Ciudad Obregon, Sonora, Mexico	
40	Win	39–1	Aurelio Muniz	PTS	10	Aug 1, 1977	18 years, 241 days	Los Mochis, Sinaloa, Mexico	
39	Win	38–1	Hector Munoz	KO	7 (?)	Jul 7, 1977	18 years, 216 days	Los Mochis, Sinaloa, Mexico	
38	Win	37–1	Carlos Ulloa	KO	1 (?)	Jun 29, 1977	18 years, 208 days	Arena Tijuana 72, Tijuana, Baja California, Mexico	
37	Win	36–1	Nexae Macias	TKO	1 (?)	Jun 17, 1977	18 years, 196 days	Ciudad Obregon, Sonora, Mexico	
36	Win	35–1	Rolando Martinez	KO	1 (?)	Apr 12, 1977	18 years, 130 days	La Paz, Baja California Sur, Mexico	
35	Win	34–1	Ramon Peraza	PTS	10	Feb 11, 1977	18 years, 70 days	Los Mochis, Sinaloa, Mexico	
34	Win	33–1	Jesus Cuate Lara	KO	4 (?)	Nov 15, 1976	17 years, 348 days	Arena Tijuana 72, Tijuana, Baja California, Mexico	
33	Win	32–1	Jose Delgado	TKO	5 (?)	Nov 5, 1976	17 years, 338 days	Guaymas, Sonora, Mexico	
32	Win	31–1	Jose Delgado	KO	3 (?)	Sep 27, 1976	17 years, 299 days	Arena Tijuana 72, Tijuana, Baja California, Mexico	
31	Win	30–1	Elio Hernandez	TKO	3 (?)	Sep 13, 1976	17 years, 285 days	Arena Tijuana 72, Tijuana, Baja California, Mexico	
30	Win	29–1	Rosendo Ramirez	TKO	5 (?)	Aug 6, 1976	17 years, 247 days	Culiacan, Sinaloa, Mexico	
29	Win	28–1	Javier Rios	KO	1 (?)	Jun 7, 1976	17 years, 187 days	Culiacan, Sinaloa, Mexico	
28	Win	27–1	Ray Esparza	TKO	4 (?)	May 17, 1976	17 years, 166 days	Arena Tijuana 72, Tijuana, Baja California, Mexico	
27	Win	26–1	Frankie Crawford	TKO	7 (?)	Feb 13, 1976	17 years, 72 days	Ciudad Obregon, Sonora, Mexico	
26	Win	25–1	Lorenzo Maldonaldo	KO	3 (?)	Oct 1, 1975	16 years, 302 days	Ciudad Obregon, Sonora, Mexico	
25	Win	24–1	Cono Lopez	KO	5 (10)	Aug 15, 1975	16 years, 255 days	Ciudad Obregon, Sonora, Mexico	
24	Win	23–1	Nino Gonzalez	PTS	10	Jun 18, 1975	16 years, 197 days	Ciudad Obregon, Sonora, Mexico	
23	Win	22–1	Ernesto Castillo	KO	2 (?)	May 21, 1975	16 years, 169 days	Ciudad Obregon, Sonora, Mexico	
22	Loss	21–1	Sergio Enriquez	PTS	10	Apr 30, 1975	16 years, 148 days	Ciudad Obregon, Sonora, Mexico	
21	Win	21–0	Jose Luis Lizarraga	KO	3 (?)	Apr 18, 1975	16 years, 136 days	Guaymas, Sonora, Mexico	
20	Win	20–0	Pajaro Morales	KO	2 (?)	Mar 21, 1975	16 years, 108 days	Ciudad Obregon, Sonora, Mexico	
19	Win	19–0	Pajaro Morales	KO	5 (?)	Jul 16, 1974	15 years, 225 days	Huatabampo, Sonora, Mexico	
18	Win	18–0	Solomon Tapia	PTS	8	Jun 14, 1974	15 years, 193 days	Navojoa, Sonora, Mexico	
17	Win	17–0	Enrique Torres	KO	3 (?)	May 17, 1974	15 years, 165 days	Navojoa, Sonora, Mexico	
16	Win	16–0	Jose Gonzalez	KO	1 (?)	May 12, 1974	15 years, 160 days	Ciudad Obregon, Sonora, Mexico	
15	Win	15–0	Rudy Sanchez	KO	2 (?)	May 7, 1974	15 years, 155 days	Huatabampo, Sonora, Mexico	
14	Win	14–0	Gustavo Guerrero	PTS	8	Apr 5, 1974	15 years, 123 days	Navojoa, Sonora, Mexico	
13	Win	13–0	Indio Huicosa	KO	2 (?)	Mar 29, 1974	15 years, 116 days	Ciudad Obregon, Sonora, Mexico	
12	Win	12–0	Mario Fortanel	KO	3 (?)	Mar 16, 1974	15 years, 103 days	Agua Prieta, Sonora, Mexico	
11	Win	11–0	Alberto Perez	KO	5 (10)	Oct 30, 1973	14 years, 331 days	Ciudad Obregon, Sonora, Mexico	
10	Win	10–0	Indio Huicosa	PTS	6	Oct 10, 1973	14 years, 311 days	Ciudad Obregon, Sonora, Mexico	
9	Win	9–0	Jesse Torres	KO	1 (?)	Sep 20, 1973	14 years, 291 days	Huatabampo, Sonora, Mexico	
8	Win	8–0	Gustavo Guerrero	TKO	5 (?)	Aug 30, 1973	14 years, 270 days	Huatabampo, Sonora, Mexico	
7	Win	7–0	Lino Munoz	KO	3 (?)	Aug 15, 1973	14 years, 255 days	Ciudad Obregon, Sonora, Mexico	
6	Win	6–0	Delfino Mendoza	PTS	6	Aug 1, 1973	14 years, 241 days	Ciudad Obregon, Sonora, Mexico	
5	Win	5–0	Delfino Mendoza	KO	1 (?)	Jul 12, 1973	14 years, 221 days	Huatabampo, Sonora, Mexico	
4	Win	4–0	Chuy Lopez	KO	3 (?)	May 15, 1973	14 years, 163 days	Huatabampo, Sonora, Mexico	
3	Win	3–0	Roberto Navarrette	KO	1 (?)	Apr 29, 1973	14 years, 147 days	Huatabampo, Sonora, Mexico	
2	Win	2–0	Noe Morales	KO	1 (?)	Apr 15, 1973	14 years, 133 days	Huatabampo, Sonora, Mexico	
1	Win	1–0	Mario Amparan	TKO	6 (?)	Mar 25, 1973	14 years, 143 days	Huatabampo, Sonora, Mexico	

== See also ==
- List of southpaw stance boxers
- List of Mexican boxing world champions
- List of world lightweight boxing champions

Sporting positions
Regional boxing titles
Vacant Title last held by José Hernández	Mexican lightweight champion June 15, 1979 – November 26, 1982; Won NABF title	Vacant Title next held by Ricardo Peralta
Vacant Title last held by Ray Mancini	NABF lightweight champion November 26, 1982 – 1983; Vacated	Vacant Title next held by Nick Furlano
World boxing titles
Preceded by Edwin Rosario	WBC lightweight champion November 3, 1984 – August 10, 1985	Succeeded by Héctor Camacho
Vacant Title last held by Héctor Camacho	WBC lightweight champion July 19, 1987 – October 29, 1988	Succeeded by Julio César Chávez
Awards
Previous: Bobby Chacon vs. W 12; Cornelius Boza-Edwards II	The Ring Fight of the Year; KO 4 Edwin Rosario II; 1984	Next: Marvin Hagler TKO 3 Thomas Hearns
