= Julio César Chávez =

Mexican boxer (born 1962)

- Chávez in 2026

Personal information
- Nicknames: J.C. Superstar; El César del Boxeo ("The Caesar of Boxing"); El Gran Campeón Mexicano ("The Great Mexican Champion"); Mr. KO; El León de Culiacán ("The Lion of Culiacán")
- Born: Julio César Chávez González; July 12, 1962 (age 64) Ciudad Obregón, Sonora, Mexico
- Height: 5 ft 7 1/2 in (171 cm)
- Weight: Super featherweight; Lightweight; Light welterweight; Welterweight

Boxing career
- Reach: 68 in (173 cm)
- Stance: Orthodox

Boxing record
- Total fights: 115
- Wins: 107
- Win by KO: 86
- Losses: 6
- Draws: 2

Julio César Chávez González (Spanish pronunciation: [ˈxuljo ˈsesaɾ ˈtʃaβes ɣonˈsales]; born July 12, 1962), also known as Julio César Chávez Sr., is a Mexican former professional boxer who competed from 1980 to 2005. A multiple-time world champion in three weight divisions, Chávez was listed by The Ring magazine as the world's best boxer, pound for pound, from 1990 to 1993. During his career he held the WBC super featherweight title from 1984 to 1987, the WBA and WBC lightweight titles between 1987 and 1989, the WBC light welterweight title twice between 1989 and 1996, and the IBF light welterweight title from 1990 to 1991. He also held the Ring magazine and lineal lightweight titles from 1988 to 1989, and the lineal light welterweight title twice between 1990 and 1996. Chávez was named Fighter of the Year for 1987 and 1990 by the Boxing Writers Association of America and The Ring respectively.

Chávez holds records for the most total successful defenses of world titles (27, shared with Omar Narváez), most title fight victories (31), most opponents beaten for a title (30) and most title fights (37); he is tied for the second-most title fights wins by knockout (21, alongside Naoya Inoue), behind Joe Louis with 22. He also holds the longest unbeaten streak in world title fights (27). His fight record was 89 wins, 0 losses, and 1 draw before his first professional loss to Frankie Randall in 1994, before which he had an 87-fight win streak until his draw with Pernell Whitaker in 1993. Chávez's 1993 win over Greg Haugen at the Estadio Azteca set the record for the largest attendance for a championship boxing match: 132,274.

As of May 2026, he is ranked as the 13th greatest boxer of all time, pound for pound, by BoxRec. He was also ranked #24 on ESPN's list of "50 Greatest Boxers of All Time", and 18th on The Ring's "80 Best Fighters of the Last 80 Years". In 2010 he was inducted into the International Boxing Hall of Fame for the Class of 2011. He is the father of current boxers Omar Chávez and former WBC middleweight champion Julio César Chávez Jr.

== Early life ==
Julio César Chávez was born on July 12, 1962, in Ciudad Obregón, Sonora, Mexico. His father, Rodolfo Chavez, worked for the railroad, and Julio grew up in an abandoned railroad car with his five sisters and four brothers. Chávez came from a poor family and became a boxer for money, he stated: "I saw my mom working, ironing, and washing people's clothes, and I promised her I would give her a house someday, and she would never have that job again." He began boxing as an amateur at the age of 16 and he then moved to Tijuana to pursue a professional career.

== Professional career ==
Chávez made his professional debut at age 17. In his 12th fight, on March 4, 1980, Chávez faced Miguel Ruiz in Culiacán, Sinaloa. At the end of the first round, Chavez landed a blow that knocked Ruiz out. Delivered as the bell sounded, the blow was ruled a disqualification in the ring and Ruiz was declared the winner. The next day, however, his manager, Ramón Felix, consulted with the Mexican Boxing Commission, and after further review, the result was overturned and Chávez was declared the winner.

=== Super featherweight ===
Chávez won his first championship, the vacant WBC Super Featherweight title, on September 13, 1984, by knocking out fellow Mexican Mario "Azabache" Martínez at the Grand Olympic Auditorium in Los Angeles. Martínez had been the betting favorite in the bout, due partly to his previous victory over former WBC world champion Rolando Navarette in a non-title bout. On April 19, 1985, Chávez defended his title against number one ranked contender Ruben Castillo (63–4–2) by knocking him out in the sixth round. On July 7, 1985, Chavez defeated former and future champion Roger Mayweather via a second-round knockout. On August 3, 1986, Chavez won a twelve-round majority decision over former WBA and future IBF Super Featherweight champion Rocky Lockridge in Monte Carlo. In his next bout, he defeated former champion Juan Laporte by a twelve-round unanimous decision. On March 18, 1987, he defeated number one ranked challenger Francisco Tomas Da Cruz (27–1) by third-round knockout. He successfully defended his WBC Super Featherweight title a total of nine times.

=== Lightweight ===
On November 21, 1987, Chávez moved up to the lightweight division and faced WBA Lightweight Champion Edwin Rosario. Prior to the bout, there were concerns about how Chávez would handle the move up in weight. Chávez commented, "Everything I've accomplished as champion, and the nine title defenses, would be thrown away with a loss to Rosario." The two fighters nearly exchanged blows during a press conference after Rosario threatened to send Chávez back to Mexico in a coffin. Chávez would ultimately give a career-defining performance as he defeated Rosario by an eleventh-round TKO to win the title. HBO Punchstat showed Rosario landing 263 of 731 punches thrown in the fight (36%) and Chavez 450 of 743 (61%). After the bout, Sports Illustrated ran the headline, "Time To Hail César: WBA Lightweight Champion César Chávez of Mexico may be the world's best fighter."

On April 16, 1988, Chávez defeated number one ranked contender Rodolfo Aguilar (20–0–1) by sixth-round technical knockout. On June 4, 1988, he won against former two-time champion Rafael Limón by scoring a seventh-round TKO. Later that year, he unified the WBA and WBC belts by a technical decision win over champion José Luis Ramírez. An accidental head-butt opened a cut on Ramírez's forehead and the doctor halted the fight, sending the decision to the judges' scorecards at that point in the fight. Chávez, ahead on all scorecards, was declared the winner. He was also awarded The Ring Lightweight title after the victory. Chavez vacated his WBA and WBC Lightweight titles in order to move up to the super lightweight division.

=== Light welterweight ===
In his next bout, he won the WBC Light Welterweight title by defeating Roger Mayweather for a second time. Mayweather did not come out of his corner after the tenth round, giving Chavez the TKO win. In 1989, Chávez defeated future champion Sammy Fuentes by tenth-round TKO. In his next bout, he handed Alberto de las Mercedes Cortes (44–0) his first career loss by scoring a third-round knockout.

==== Chávez vs. Taylor ====
On March 17, 1990, he faced Meldrick Taylor, the undefeated IBF Light Welterweight Champion, in a title unification fight. While Taylor carried the fight to Chavez through round 8, Julio rallied in the last four rounds. With about 30 seconds left in the 12th round, he landed a hard straight right hand on the chin of Taylor, which hurt him badly. Shortly thereafter, he knocked down the former Olympic gold medalist. Although Taylor rose at the referee's count of six, he failed to respond coherently to referee Richard Steele's questions after being issued a mandatory 8 count, and continued to hold onto the ropes in the corner, resulting in Steele stopping the fight with only two seconds remaining. Many boxing fans and members of the media were outraged that Steele would stop a match that Taylor was winning with only two seconds left, while others felt that Steele was justified in stopping the fight given Taylor's condition and the fact that he was unable to respond to Steele before the conclusion of the match. Steele defended his decision by saying that his concern is protecting a fighter, regardless of how much time is left in the round or the fight. As Steele put it, "I stopped it because Meldrick had took a lot of good shots, a lot of hard shots, and it was time for it to stop. You know, I'm not the timekeeper, and I don't care about the time. When I see a man that has had enough, I'm stopping the fight." The Ring named it the "Fight of the Year" for 1990 and later the "Fight of the Decade" for the 1990s. While many hoped for an immediate rematch, Taylor opted to move up in weight in his next bout and the fighters did not meet again until 1994, when Chávez dominated and knocked out a faded Taylor in eight rounds.

After unifying the titles, Chávez engaged in a busy series of title defenses and non-title fights. On December 8, 1990, he defeated the WBC mandatory challenger Kyung-Duk Ahn (29–1) by third-round knockout. On March 18, 1991, he defeated WBC number five ranked fighter John Duplessis (34–1) by fourth-round TKO. On September 14, 1991, Chávez won a twelve-round unanimous decision over former champion Lonnie Smith. On April 10, 1992, he scored a TKO victory over number-one ranked contender Angel Hernandez (37–0–2, 22 KOs) in the fifth round. Later that year, he defeated Frankie Mitchell (29–1) by fourth-round TKO.

==== Chávez vs. Camacho ====
On September 12, 1992, Chávez faced WBO light welterweight champion Héctor Camacho (41–1, 18 KOs) in a highly anticipated bout. Chávez dominated Camacho en route to a unanimous decision win. The final scores were 117–111, 119–110 and 120–107 for Chávez. After the fight, on his arrival to Mexico, the President Carlos Salinas de Gortari sent the special car reserved for the Pope to take him from the airport to the President's house.

==== Chávez vs. Haugen ====
His 1993 fight with Greg Haugen featured trash talk from Haugen, who derided Chavez's 82-fight unbeaten streak as consisting mostly of "Tijuana taxi drivers that my mother could have knocked out" and insisting that "There aren't 130,000 Mexicans who can afford tickets" to see the fight in Estadio Azteca. Chávez responded by saying, "I really hate him bad. When he looks at me, I want to vomit. I am going to give him the worst beating of his life; I am going to make him swallow the words that came out of his dirty mouth." Ultimately, 136,274 showed up to set a world record for outdoor fight attendance as they watched Chávez drop Haugen quickly and then back off with the apparent intention of punishing him for his prefight remarks. However, the referee had seen enough by the fifth round and stopped it for a TKO victory for Chávez. After the fight, Chávez commented to Haugen, "Now you know I don't fight with taxi drivers," and a bloodied Haugen responded, "They must have been tough taxi drivers." Later that year, Chávez scored a sixth-round TKO victory over number one ranked contender Terrence Alli.

=== Draw with Whitaker and first career loss ===
After a division-record 18 consecutive defenses of his light welterweight title, Chávez (87–0) moved up one more weight division to challenge Pernell Whitaker (32–1) for his WBC Welterweight title in September 1993. Since the late 1980s, Chávez stated several times that he wanted a fight against Whitaker. The Whitaker team, among them Lou Duva, told The Ring that they did not want a fight against Chavez in those days. The result of the fight was a controversial majority draw, allowing Chávez to remain undefeated with Whitaker retaining his title. Various members of the American media, including The Ring and Sports Illustrated, were critical of the decision. Sports Illustrated put Pernell Whitaker on the cover of its next magazine with a one word title, "Robbed!" Chávez stated after the fight: "I felt I was forcing the fight ... he just kept holding me too much, he was throwing too many low blows too." There was no rematch.

Chavez continued defending his Light Welterweight title and on December 18, 1993, he defeated British Commonwealth Light Welterweight Champion Andy Holligan (21–0) by fifth-round TKO. Chávez faced Frankie Randall on January 29, 1994, in a fight that most expected him to win easily. Instead, Randall knocked him down for the first time in his career and went on to win a split decision and Chávez lost the title to Randall. Chávez blamed his loss on referee Richard Steele, who deducted two points from Chávez for low blows, which affected the difference on the scorecards. The WBC ordered an immediate rematch and Chávez regained the title on a split technical decision in May 1994. The fight was fiercely contested when they collided heads, opening a large cut over Chávez's eyebrow in the seventh round. After the head cut, during round eight, the referee called for the doctor, who then stopped the fight. Under WBC rules, Randall lost one point, giving Chávez the technical victory. The two faced one another in a rubber match 10 years later, which Chávez won.

Chavez then faced Meldrick Taylor in a rematch, four years after their historic first fight. Chavez defeated him in the eighth round by a knockout that sent Taylor from one side of the ring to the other. In his next bout, Chavez defeated three-time champion Tony Lopez. In 1995, he defeated former and future Light Welterweight Champion Giovanni Parisi. Later that year, he defended his title against number one ranked challenger David Kamau, despite suffering a cut in the opening round. Prior to the bout, Chavez indicated that he was considering retirement: "I've had a lot of problems with my arms, with my knees. I really don't want to extend myself much longer", Chávez said. "After so many years of working out, it all builds up. I am not giving what I used to be able to give. I will fight De La Hoya for a lot of money, and then retire."

==== Chávez vs. De La Hoya ====
On June 7, 1996, Chávez faced Oscar De La Hoya. A large gash appeared over the left eye of Chávez within the first minute of the first round, leading many to assume what Chávez later confirmed—that the cut occurred earlier in training and was re-opened in the bout. Heavy blood flow prompted the doctor to stop the fight in the fourth round. Until their eventual rematch in 1998, Chávez would always state that De La Hoya had not defeated him, but that a gash that he had suffered in training was the real cause of the stoppage of the fight. In his next bout, Chávez defeated former champion Joey Gamache in his 100th career bout.

==== Chávez vs. González ====
An elbow injury to Chávez forced postponement of his fight with González. The fight was scheduled for Oct 25th 1997.

A year after De La Hoya moved up to welterweight in 1997, Chávez fought Miguel Ángel González for the vacant WBC Light Welterweight title. That fight ended in a draw. In a rematch with De La Hoya for the WBC Welterweight belt in September 1998, De La Hoya won by 8th-round TKO. About De La Hoya, Chávez stated years after, "I have nothing against him, even though he beat me twice. I have no resentment towards him... De La Hoya was younger than me during our fight, and I was on my way out of boxing. If Oscar didn't fight me, he would not have been anything in boxing." Chavez spoke about his sparring session with De La Hoya six years before their first fight and stated: "I sparred with him and dropped him in the second round with a right hand. De la Hoya was a kid... that day after training he stayed and we went out to dinner, I gave him some $300-$400 from my pocket to help him out."

=== Retirement and farewell fights ===
Chavez won his first two bouts in 1999 before losing to then 32-year-old Willy Wise via 10-round unanimous decision. In 2000, at the age of 38, Chávez challenged Light Welterweight Champion Kostya Tszyu. Chavez lost the bout via 6th-round TKO. After a 2001 victory over Terry Thomas in Ciudad Juárez, Mexico, Chávez retired. However, on November 24, 2003, he came out of retirement to avenge his earlier loss to Willy Wise, knocking Wise out in two rounds in Tijuana, Mexico. In April 2004, Chávez went back into the ring, for what he again claimed would be his last appearance. In that fight, nicknamed Adiós, México, Gracias (Good-bye, Mexico, Thank you), he beat his former conqueror, Frankie Randall, by a ten-round decision. On May 28, 2005, Chávez once again stepped into a boxing ring, outpointing Ivan Robinson in ten rounds at the Staples Center (this fight was televised by Showtime Championship Boxing). On September 17, 2005, at the U.S. Airways Center in Phoenix, Arizona, Chávez suffered a TKO loss to until then little-known Grover Wiley in the 115th bout of his career, retiring in his corner before the start of the 5th round, after injuring his right hand. After the bout, Chávez told his promoter, Bob Arum, that this time he was definitely retiring from boxing. His defeat was avenged two years later by his son, Julio César Chávez, Jr., who knocked Wiley out in the third round of their fight.

== Exhibition bouts ==
Chávez has fought multiple exhibition bouts for charitable causes.

On January 1, 1985, Chavez scored a third-round technical knockout over Manny Hernandez in an exhibition bout staged in Mexico City, Mexico to garner money for the victims of a 1984 gas explosion in Mexico.

Late in 2014, Julio César Chávez returned to the ring for an exhibition with Vicente Sagrestano in a bout aimed at collecting toys for poor children.

He and former rival Mario Martinez, against whom he earned his first world championship in 1984, faced each other again on July 3, 2015, in an event to benefit Chavez's two drug rehabilitation clinics.

== Personal life ==
During the late part of his career, Chávez struggled with drug addiction and alcohol abuse. He stated that he started drinking the night after his fight against Edwin Rosario. He later developed a cocaine habit. Chávez got into rehab several times until he recovered.

Chávez is the father of Omar Chávez and former WBC Middleweight Champion Julio César Chávez, Jr. He works as an analyst for ESPN and TV Azteca, and spends his time between Mexico and the United States, where he owns businesses and properties. He also has a daughter, Nicole Chavez, who is a participant on the Telemundo television reality show, La Casa de los Famosos.

Chávez's brother, Rafael Chávez González, was murdered on Sunday, June 25, 2017, during a robbery at one of Rafael's businesses.

== Career in review ==
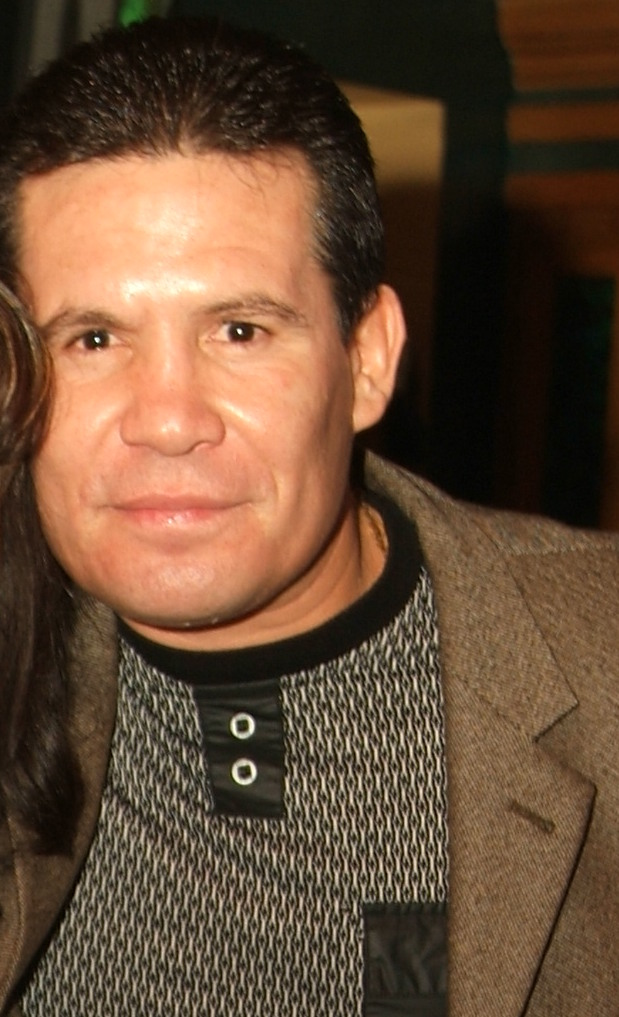
Julio César Chávez in 2006

Chávez won six world titles in three weight divisions: WBC Super Featherweight (1984), WBA Lightweight (1987), WBC Lightweight (1988), WBC Light Welterweight (1989), IBF Light Welterweight (1990) and WBC Light Welterweight (1994) for the second time. He was also awarded The Ring Lightweight Championship in 1988. World champions whom Chávez defeated include Jose Luis Ramírez, Rafael Limón, Rocky Lockridge, Meldrick Taylor, Roger Mayweather, Lonnie Smith, Sammy Fuentes, Héctor "Macho" Camacho, Juan Laporte, Edwin Rosario, Greg Haugen, Tony López, Giovanni Parisi, Joey Gamache and Frankie Randall, who had taken the WBC Light Welterweight belt from Chávez just four months earlier. He also lost to three champions: Frankie Randall, Oscar De La Hoya and Kostya Tszyu. He was held to a draw by two others: Pernell Whitaker and Miguel Ángel González.

Chávez retired in his 25th year as a professional boxer with a record of 107 wins, 6 losses and 2 draws, with 86 knockouts and is considered one of the greatest fighters of all time. He holds records for most successful consecutive defenses of world titles (27), most title fights (37), most title-fight victories (31) and he is after Naoya Inoue (with 23) and Joe Louis (with 22) for most title fights won by knockout (21). His record was 89-0-1 going into his first loss to Frankie Randall and had an 87 fight win streak until his draw with Whitaker. He was ranked No. 50 on Ring Magazine's list of "100 greatest punchers of all time". As an in-fighter or "swarmer," Julio César Chávez was renowned specially for his devastating left hook and his extremely strong chin. Former heavyweight champion Mike Tyson, stated that Chávez was one of the greatest fighters of his generation and top five of all time from his point of view. Trainer Angelo Dundee said that Chávez had one of the strongest chins in boxing history. In 2002, The Ring ranked Chávez as the 18th greatest fighter of the last 80 years. On December 7, 2010, his induction to the International Boxing Hall of Fame was announced.

== Professional boxing record ==
115 fights	107 wins	6 losses
By knockout	86	4
By decision	21	2
Draws	2	

No.	Result	Record	Opponent	Type	Round, time	Date	Location	Notes
115	Loss	107–6–2	Grover Wiley	RTD	5 (10), 3:00	Sep 17, 2005	America West Arena, Phoenix, Arizona, U.S.	
114	Win	107–5–2	Ivan Robinson	UD	10	May 28, 2005	Staples Center, Los Angeles, California, U.S.	
113	Win	106–5–2	Frankie Randall	UD	10	May 22, 2004	Plaza de Toros, Mexico City, Mexico	
112	Win	105–5–2	Willy Wise	TKO	2 (10)	Nov 22, 2003	Centro de Espectáculos Alamar, Tijuana, Mexico	
111	Win	104–5–2	Terry Thomas	TKO	2 (10), 0:50	Nov 24, 2001	Plaza de Toros Monumental, Ciudad Juárez, Mexico	
110	Loss	103–5–2	Kostya Tszyu	TKO	6 (12), 1:28	Jul 29, 2000	Veteran's Memorial Coliseum, Phoenix, Arizona, U.S.	For WBC light welterweight title
109	Win	103–4–2	Buck Smith	TKO	3 (10)	Dec 18, 1999	Culiacán, Mexico	
108	Loss	102–4–2	Willy Wise	UD	10	Oct 2, 1999	Las Vegas Hilton, Winchester, Nevada, U.S.	
107	Win	102–3–2	Marty Jakubowski	TKO	4 (10)	Jul 10, 1999	Plaza de Toros Calafia, Mexicali, Mexico	
106	Win	101–3–2	Verdell Smith	TKO	4 (10), 1:36	Apr 1, 1999	Don Haskins Center, El Paso, Texas, U.S.	
105	Loss	100–3–2	Oscar De La Hoya	RTD	8 (12), 3:00	Sep 18, 1998	Thomas & Mack Center, Paradise, Nevada, U.S.	For WBC welterweight title
104	Win	100–2–2	Ken Sigurani	TKO	3 (10), 2:09	Jun 25, 1998	Foxwoods Resort Casino, Ledyard, Connecticut, U.S.	
103	Draw	99–2–2	Miguel Ángel González	SD	12	Mar 7, 1998	Plaza de Toros, Mexico City, Mexico	For vacant WBC light welterweight title
102	Win	99–2–1	Larry LaCoursiere	UD	10	Jun 28, 1997	MGM Grand Garden Arena, Paradise, Nevada, U.S.	
101	Win	98–2–1	Tony Martin	UD	10	Mar 29, 1997	Las Vegas Hilton, Winchester, Nevada, U.S.	
100	Win	97–2–1	Joey Gamache	TKO	8 (10), 3:00	Oct 12, 1996	Arrowhead Pond, Anaheim, California, U.S.	
99	Loss	96–2–1	Oscar De La Hoya	TKO	4 (12), 2:37	Jun 7, 1996	Caesars Palace, Paradise, Nevada, U.S.	Lost WBC light welterweight title
98	Win	96–1–1	Scott Walker	TKO	2 (10), 2:45	Feb 9, 1996	Caesars Palace, Paradise, Nevada, U.S.	
97	Win	95–1–1	David Kamau	UD	12	Sep 16, 1995	The Mirage, Paradise, Nevada, U.S.	Retained WBC light welterweight title
96	Win	94–1–1	Craig Houk	KO	1 (10), 1:19	Jul 29, 1995	United Center, Chicago, Illinois, U.S.	
95	Win	93–1–1	Giovanni Parisi	UD	12	Apr 8, 1995	Caesars Palace, Paradise, Nevada, U.S.	Retained WBC light welterweight title
94	Win	92–1–1	Tony Lopez	TKO	10 (12), 1:41	Dec 10, 1994	Estadio de Béisbol, Monterrey, Mexico	Retained WBC light welterweight title
93	Win	91–1–1	Meldrick Taylor	TKO	8 (12), 1:41	Sep 17, 1994	MGM Grand Garden Arena, Paradise, Nevada, U.S.	Retained WBC light welterweight title
92	Win	90–1–1	Frankie Randall	TD	8 (12), 2:57	May 7, 1994	MGM Grand Garden Arena, Paradise, Nevada, U.S.	Won WBC light welterweight title; Split TD after Chávez was cut from an accidental head clash
91	Loss	89–1–1	Frankie Randall	SD	12	Jan 29, 1994	MGM Grand Garden Arena, Paradise, Nevada, U.S.	Lost WBC light welterweight title
90	Win	89–0–1	Andy Holligan	TKO	5 (12)	Dec 18, 1993	Estadio Cuauhtémoc, Puebla City, Mexico	Retained WBC light welterweight title
89	Win	88–0–1	Mike Powell	TKO	4 (10)	Oct 30, 1993	Ciudad Juárez, Mexico	
88	Draw	87–0–1	Pernell Whitaker	MD	12	Sep 10, 1993	Alamodome, San Antonio, Texas, U.S.	For WBC welterweight title
87	Win	87–0	Terrence Alli	TKO	6 (12), 0:45	May 8, 1993	Thomas & Mack Center, Paradise, Nevada, U.S.	Retained WBC light welterweight title
86	Win	86–0	Silvio Walter Rojas	KO	3 (10), 2:05	Apr 10, 1993	Auditorio Benito Juárez, Guadalajara, Mexico	
85	Win	85–0	Greg Haugen	TKO	5 (12), 2:02	Feb 20, 1993	Estadio Azteca, Mexico City, Mexico	Retained WBC light welterweight title
84	Win	84–0	Marty Jakubowski	TKO	6 (10), 0:18	Dec 13, 1992	The Mirage, Paradise, Nevada, U.S.	
83	Win	83–0	Bruce Pearson	KO	3 (10), 1:30	Oct 31, 1992	Culiacán, Mexico	
82	Win	82–0	Héctor Camacho	UD	12	Sep 12, 1992	Thomas & Mack Center, Paradise, Nevada, U.S.	Retained WBC light welterweight title
81	Win	81–0	Frankie Mitchell	TKO	4 (12), 0:56	Aug 1, 1992	Las Vegas Hilton, Winchester, Nevada, U.S.	Retained WBC light welterweight title
80	Win	80–0	Angel Hernandez	TKO	5 (12), 1:11	Apr 10, 1992	Toreo de Cuatro Caminos, Mexico City, Mexico	Retained WBC light welterweight title
79	Win	79–0	Juan Soberanes Ramos	KO	4 (10)	Mar 13, 1992	La Paz, Mexico	
78	Win	78–0	Ignacio Perdomo	RTD	7 (10), 3:00	Dec 13, 1991	Hermosillo, Mexico	
77	Win	77–0	Jorge Alberto Melian	KO	4 (10), 1:36	Nov 12, 1991	Mexico City, Mexico	
76	Win	76–0	Lonnie Smith	UD	12	Sep 14, 1991	The Mirage, Paradise, Nevada, U.S.	Retained WBC light welterweight title
75	Win	75–0	Tommy Small	KO	4 (10), 0:56	Apr 26, 1991	Estadio General Ángel Flores, Culiacán, Mexico	
74	Win	74–0	John Duplessis	TKO	4 (12), 2:42	Mar 18, 1991	The Mirage, Paradise, Nevada, U.S.	Retained WBC and IBF light welterweight titles
73	Win	73–0	Kyung-Duk Ahn	TKO	3 (12), 2:14	Dec 8, 1990	Convention Hall, Atlantic City, New Jersey, U.S.	Retained WBC and IBF light welterweight titles
72	Win	72–0	Jaime Balboa	TKO	4 (10), 2:10	Nov 8, 1990	Mazatlán, Mexico	
71	Win	71–0	Russell Mosley	KO	3 (10)	Aug 18, 1990	Culiacán, Mexico	
70	Win	70–0	Akwei Addo	KO	2 (10)	Jul 5, 1990	Palacio de Deportes, Madrid, Spain	
69	Win	69–0	Meldrick Taylor	TKO	12 (12), 2:58	Mar 17, 1990	Las Vegas Hilton, Winchester, Nevada, U.S.	Retained WBC light welterweight title; Won IBF light welterweight title
68	Win	68–0	Alberto de las Mercedes Cortes	TKO	3 (12), 1:56	Dec 16, 1989	Palacio de los Deportes, Mexico City, Mexico	Retained WBC light welterweight title
67	Win	67–0	Sammy Fuentes	RTD	10 (12), 3:00	Nov 18, 1989	Caesars Palace, Paradise, Nevada, U.S.	Retained WBC light welterweight title
66	Win	66–0	Ramon Aramburu	KO	3 (10)	Oct 27, 1989	Mazatlán, Mexico	
65	Win	65–0	Rodolfo Batta	KO	1 (10), 2:56	Oct 9, 1989	Bullring by the Sea, Tijuana, Mexico	
64	Win	64–0	Kenny Vice	TKO	3 (10), 1:57	Jul 30, 1989	Convention Hall, Atlantic City, New Jersey, U.S.	
63	Win	63–0	Roger Mayweather	RTD	10 (12), 3:00	May 13, 1989	Great Western Forum, Inglewood, California, U.S.	Won WBC light welterweight title
62	Win	62–0	José Luis Ramírez	TD	11 (12), 0:54	Oct 29, 1988	Las Vegas Hilton, Winchester, Nevada, U.S.	Retained WBA lightweight title; Won WBC and vacant The Ring lightweight titles; Unanimous TD after Ramírez was cut from an accidental head clash
61	Win	61–0	Vernon Buchanan	TKO	3 (10), 2:02	Aug 1, 1988	Great Western Forum, Inglewood, California, U.S.	
60	Win	60–0	Rafael Limón	TKO	7 (10)	Jun 4, 1988	Mazatlán, Mexico	
59	Win	59–0	Rodolfo Aguilar	TKO	6 (12), 1:13	Apr 16, 1988	Las Vegas Hilton, Winchester, Nevada, U.S.	Retained WBA lightweight title
58	Win	58–0	Nicky Perez	TKO	3 (10)	Mar 5, 1988	Tijuana, Mexico	
57	Win	57–0	Edwin Rosario	TKO	11 (12), 2:38	Nov 21, 1987	Hilton, Winchester, Nevada, U.S.	Won WBA lightweight title
56	Win	56–0	Danilo Cabrera	UD	12	Aug 21, 1987	Agua Caliente Racetrack, Tijuana, Mexico	Retained WBC super featherweight title
55	Win	55–0	Francisco Tomas Da Cruz	TKO	3 (12), 2:31	Apr 18, 1987	Nîmes, France	Retained WBC super featherweight title
54	Win	54–0	Juan Laporte	UD	12	Dec 12, 1986	Madison Square Garden, New York City, New York, U.S.	Retained WBC super featherweight title
53	Win	53–0	Rocky Lockridge	MD	12	Aug 3, 1986	Stade Louis II, Fontvieille, Monaco	Retained WBC super featherweight title
52	Win	52–0	Refugio Rojas	TKO	7 (12), 2:33	Jun 13, 1986	Madison Square Garden, New York City, New York, U.S.	Retained WBC super featherweight title
51	Win	51–0	Faustino Martires Barrios	TKO	5 (12), 2:02	May 15, 1986	Stade Pierre de Coubertin, Paris, France	Retained WBC super featherweight title
50	Win	50–0	Roberto Collins Lindo	KO	2 (10), 0:31	Mar 22, 1986	Riviera, Winchester, Nevada, U.S.	
49	Win	49–0	Jeff Bumpus	TD	5 (10), 1:19	Dec 19, 1985	Grand Olympic Auditorium, Los Angeles, California, U.S.	Unanimous TD after Chávez was cut from an accidental head clash
48	Win	48–0	Dwight Pratchett	UD	12	Sep 21, 1985	Riviera, Winchester, Nevada, U.S.	Retained WBC super featherweight title
47	Win	47–0	Roger Mayweather	TKO	2 (12), 2:30	Jul 7, 1985	Riviera, Winchester, Nevada, U.S.	Retained WBC super featherweight title
46	Win	46–0	Ruben Castillo	TKO	6 (12), 2:56	Apr 19, 1985	The Forum, Inglewood, California, U.S.	Retained WBC super featherweight title
45	Win	45–0	Manuel Hernandez	TKO	3 (10)	Jan 1, 1985	Toreo de Cuatro Caminos, Mexico City, Mexico	
44	Win	44–0	Mario Martínez	TKO	8 (12), 3:00	Sep 13, 1984	Grand Olympic Auditorium, Los Angeles, California, U.S.	Won vacant WBC super featherweight title
43	Win	43–0	Delfino Mendoza	KO	3	Jun 13, 1984	Hermosillo, Mexico	
42	Win	42–0	Ramon Avitia	KO	6	May 4, 1984	Culiacán, Mexico	
41	Win	41–0	Armando Flores	KO	3	Dec 30, 1983	Mazatlán, Mexico	
40	Win	40–0	Adriano Arreola	PTS	10	Sep 1, 1983	Grand Olympic Auditorium, Los Angeles, California, U.S.	
39	Win	39–0	Benjamin Abarca	KO	5	Jul 16, 1983	Culiacán, Mexico	
38	Win	38–0	Romero Sandoval	KO	2 (10), 1:58	Jun 15, 1983	Grand Olympic Auditorium, Los Angeles, California, U.S.	
37	Win	37–0	Javier Fragoso	KO	4	May 1, 1983	Roberto Clemente Coliseum, San Juan, Puerto Rico	
36	Win	36–0	Ernesto Herrera	KO	2	Apr 4, 1983	Tijuana, Mexico	
35	Win	35–0	Othoniel Lopez	KO	4	Feb 25, 1983	Ensenada, Mexico	
34	Win	34–0	Jerry Lewis	KO	6 (10)	Dec 11, 1982	Memorial Auditorium, Sacramento, California, U.S.	
33	Win	33–0	Jerry Lewis	KO	5	Oct 23, 1982	Tijuana, Mexico	
32	Win	32–0	Jose Resendez	KO	6 (10)	Sep 28, 1982	Auditorio Fausto Gutierrez Moreno, Tijuana, Mexico	
31	Win	31–0	Santos Rodriguez	KO	8	Aug 20, 1982	Culiacán, Mexico	
30	Win	30–0	Gustavo Salgado	KO	2 (10)	Jul 19, 1982	Auditorio Fausto Gutierrez Moreno, Tijuana, Mexico	
29	Win	29–0	Juan Carlos Alvarado	KO	3	May 8, 1982	Culiacán, Mexico	
28	Win	28–0	Benny Abarca	PTS	10	Apr 26, 1982	Tijuana, Mexico	
27	Win	27–0	Johnny Jensen	KO	3	Mar 11, 1982	Tijuana, Mexico	
26	Win	26–0	Carlos Bryant	KO	2	Feb 19, 1982	Culiacán, Mexico	
25	Win	25–0	Ramon Peraza	KO	1	Feb 4, 1982	Tijuana, Mexico	
24	Win	24–0	Jesús García	KO	2	Jan 29, 1982	Guamúchil, Mexico	
23	Win	23–0	Ramon Luque	KO	1	Jan 12, 1982	Tijuana, Mexico	
22	Win	22–0	Manuel Vasquez	KO	7	Dec 17, 1981	Culiacán, Mexico	
21	Win	21–0	Jose Angel Medina	KO	6	Oct 19, 1981	Tijuana, Mexico	
20	Win	20–0	Jorge Ramirez	KO	2	Sep 25, 1981	Culiacán, Mexico	
19	Win	19–0	Daniel Felizardo	KO	3 (10)	Aug 31, 1981	Tijuana, Mexico	
18	Win	18–0	Jesus Cuate Lara	KO	2 (10)	Aug 7, 1981	Culiacán, Mexico	
17	Win	17–0	Daniel Martinez	KO	1	Jul 27, 1981	Tijuana, Mexico	
16	Win	16–0	Bobby Fernandez	KO	3	Jul 10, 1981	Culiacán, Mexico	
15	Win	15–0	Fidel Navarro	KO	1	Jun 26, 1981	Culiacán, Mexico	
14	Win	14–0	Victor Gamez	KO	1	Jun 5, 1981	Culiacán, Mexico	
13	Win	13–0	Eduardo Lalo Acosta	KO	2	May 8, 1981	Culiacán, Mexico	
12	Win	12–0	Miguel Ruiz	KO	1	Mar 4, 1981	Culiacán, Mexico	
11	Win	11–0	Julio Gaxiola	KO	4	Feb 2, 1981	Tijuana, Mexico	
10	Win	10–0	Roberto Flores	KO	3	Dec 15, 1980	Culiacán, Mexico	
9	Win	9–0	Andres Felix	KO	2	Nov 26, 1980	Culiacán, Mexico	
8	Win	8–0	Jesus Martinez	KO	1	Oct 13, 1980	Culiacán, Mexico	
7	Win	7–0	Jesus Cuate Lara	PTS	10	Sep 22, 1980	Culiacán, Mexico	
6	Win	6–0	Miguel Cebrero	PTS	10	Sep 5, 1980	Culiacán, Mexico	
5	Win	5–0	Tito Geraldo	PTS	6	Jul 18, 1980	Guamúchil, Mexico	
4	Win	4–0	Roberto Garcia	TKO	6 (6)	May 20, 1980	Guaymas, Mexico	
3	Win	3–0	Ramon Flores	KO	3 (6)	Apr 8, 1980	Navojoa, Mexico	
2	Win	2–0	Fidencio Cebreros	PTS	6	Mar 3, 1980	Culiacán, Mexico	
1	Win	1–0	Andres Felix	KO	6 (6)	Feb 5, 1980	Culiacán, Mexico	

== Exhibition boxing record ==
6 fights	0 wins	0 losses
Non-scored	6	

No.	Result	Record	Opponent	Type	Round, time	Date	Location	Notes
6	—N/a	0–0 (6)	Héctor Camacho Jr.	—N/a	4	Jun 19, 2021	Estadio Jalisco, Guadalajara, Mexico	Non-scored bout
5	—N/a	0–0 (5)	Jorge Arce	—N/a	4	Sep 25, 2020	Grand Hotel Tijuana, Tijuana, Mexico	Non-scored bout
4	—N/a	0–0 (4)	Jorge Arce	—N/a	3	Feb 28, 2020	Hermosillo Multipurpose Center, Hermosillo, Mexico	Non-scored bout
3	—N/a	0–0 (3)	Jorge Arce	—N/a	3	Nov 22, 2019	Auditorio Fausto Gutierrez Moreno, Tijuana, Mexico	Non-scored bout
2	—N/a	0–0 (2)	Mario Martínez	—N/a	3	Jul 3, 2015	Culiacán, Mexico	Non-scored bout
1	—N/a	0–0 (1)	Vicente Sagrestano	—N/a	4	Dec 18, 2014	Hermosillo Multipurpose Center, Hermosillo, Mexico	Non-scored bout

== Titles in boxing ==
=== Major world titles ===
- WBC super featherweight champion (130 lbs)
- WBA lightweight champion (135 lbs)
- WBC lightweight champion (135 lbs)
- WBC light welterweight champion (140 lbs) (2×)
- IBF light welterweight champion (140 lbs)

=== The Ring magazine titles ===
- The Ring lightweight champion (135 lbs)

=== Honorary titles ===
- WBC Otomi champion

== Pay-per-view bouts ==
Date	Fight	Billing	Buys	Network
September 12, 1992	Chávez vs. Camacho	Ultimate Glory	740,000 to 800,000	Showtime
September 10, 1993	Whitaker vs. Chávez	The Fight	?	Showtime
May 7, 1994	Randall vs. Chávez II	Revenge: The Rematches	?	Showtime
September 17, 1994	Chávez vs. Taylor II	Unfinished Business	?	Showtime
September 18, 1998	De La Hoya vs. Chávez II	Ultimate Revenge	525,000	HBO

== See also ==
- List of WBA world champions
- List of WBC world champions
- List of IBF world champions
- List of lightweight boxing champions
- List of light welterweight boxing champions
- List of boxing triple champions
- Notable boxing families
- List of Mexican boxing world champions

Sporting positions
World boxing titles
Vacant Title last held by Héctor Camacho	WBC super featherweight champion September 13, 1984 – December 29, 1987; Vacated	Vacant Title next held by Azumah Nelson
Preceded by Edwin Rosario	WBA lightweight champion November 21, 1987 – June 1, 1989; Vacated	Vacant Title next held by Edwin Rosario
Preceded by José Luis Ramírez	WBC lightweight champion October 29, 1988 – June 25, 1989; Vacated	Vacant Title next held by Pernell Whitaker
Vacant Title last held by Alexis Argüello	The Ring lightweight champion October 29, 1988 - 1989; Vacated	Vacant Title next held by Pernell Whitaker
Preceded by Roger Mayweather	WBC light welterweight champion May 13, 1989 – January 29, 1994	Succeeded by Frankie Randall
Preceded by Meldrick Taylor	IBF light welterweight champion March 17, 1990 – December 8, 1990; Vacated	Vacant Title next held by Rafael Pineda
Preceded by Frankie Randall	WBC light welterweight champion May 7, 1994 – June 7, 1996	Succeeded by Oscar De La Hoya
Achievements
Preceded by Mike Tyson	The Ring pound for pound #1 boxer February 12, 1990 – September 15, 1993	Succeeded by Pernell Whitaker
