= Darryl Tyson =

American boxer

Personal information
- Nickname: Terrible T
- Nationality: American
- Born: Darryl Tyson; October 17, 1960 (age 65) Washington, D.C.
- Height: 5 ft 7 in (1.70 m)
- Weight: Lightweight; Junior Welterweight

Boxing career

Boxing record
- Total fights: 65
- Wins: 50
- Win by KO: 24
- Losses: 14
- Draws: 1
- No contests: 0

Darryl Tyson (born October 17, 1960) is an American former professional boxer. He is a former WBC Continental Americas lightweight champion and former USBA and NABF champion in the lightweight and junior welterweight divisions.

== Professional career ==
Tyson began boxing professionally in 1982 and faced a number of tough opponents in his 20 years of boxing. On August 15, 1986, he lost by unanimous decision in his first world title shot to Jimmy Paul for the IBF lightweight title; this was a rematch bout, Tyson having won their first match by ten rounds split decision. On December 5, 1992, Tyson lost in his second world title shot by unanimous decision to Miguel Ángel González for the WBC lightweight title. In his next fight, Tyson fought former WBA lightweight champion Livingstone Bramble to a draw. Next Tyson lost to Rafael Ruelas. In his next fight Tyson beat Roger Mayweather. In 1995, Tyson lost to Freddie Pendleton by technical knockout in round ten. In 1996, he was knocked out in the second round by Oscar De La Hoya. He would lose his next three fights to Shea Neary, Diosbelys Hurtado, and Zab Judah. In 2000, Tyson defeated Emmanuel Clottey by split decision. Four years later, he lost to DeMarcus Corley.
