= Mathias Czwiczek =

German painter

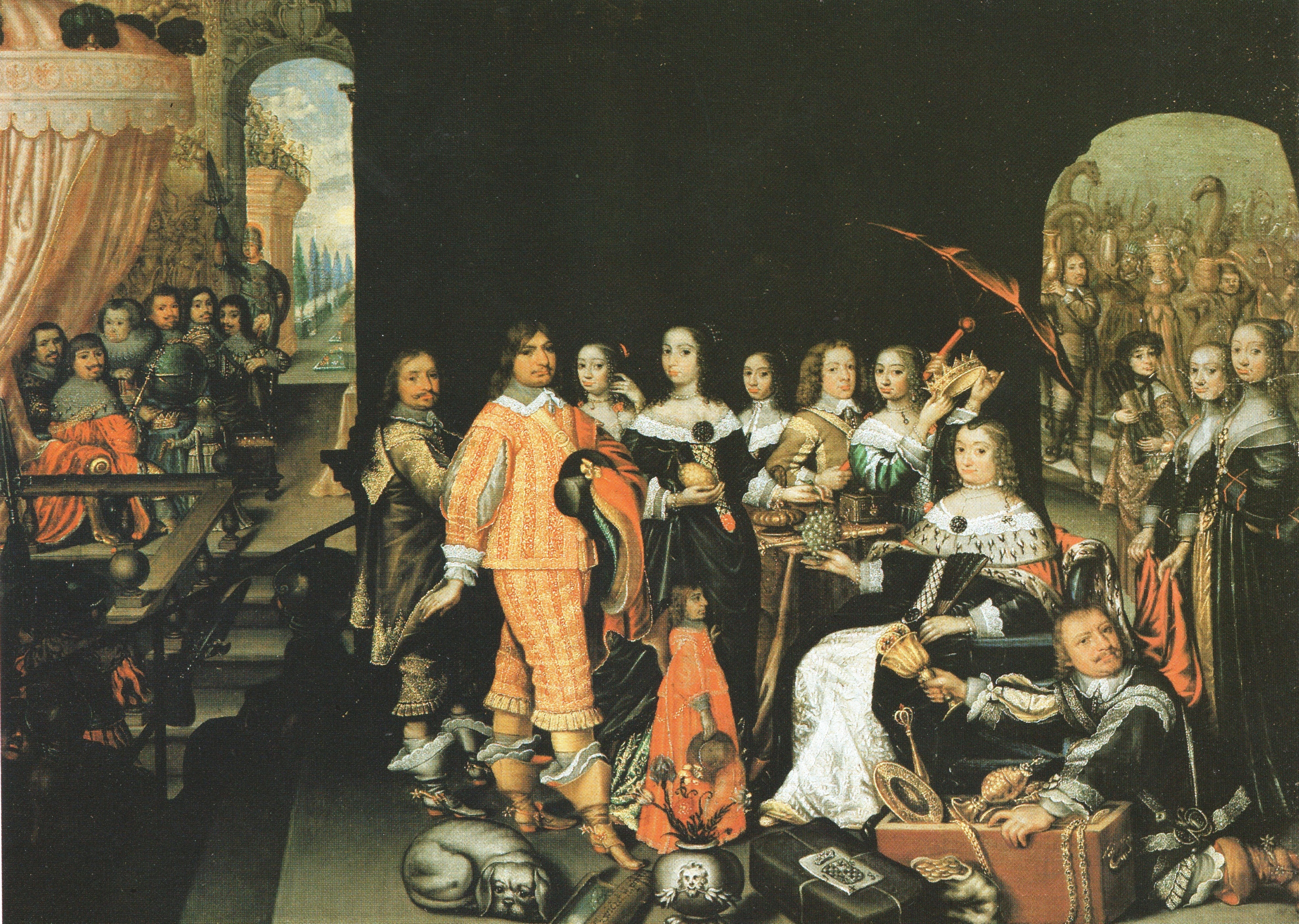
Elizabeth Charlotte of the Palatinate (1597–1660) posing as the Queen of Sheba with her husband George William, Elector of Brandenburg at her feet and her son Frederick Willem and his wife Louise Henriette in attendance.

Mathias Czwiczek also Maciej Croiczek, Cwiczeck, Cwiczek, Cwiczeke, Czwiczeck, Czwiczek, Czwiczik, Schwetzge and Schwezge (1601, Královec – 1654, Königsberg), was a Bohemian painter active in Brandenburg-Prussia.

== Biography ==
According to the Netherlands Institute for Art History, he was court painter to Frederick William, Elector of Brandenburg and made many trips in his company to the Netherlands and France. He is known for paintings of interiors with figures. In 1628 he entered into service of George William, Elector of Brandenburg. Paintings in the so-called Chapel of Love in Krosno including St. Stanislaus resurrecting the deceased Knight Piotr and portraits of Stanisław Oświęcim and his sister Anna Oświęcimówna are attributed to Czwiczek.
