= Oświęcim Chapel =

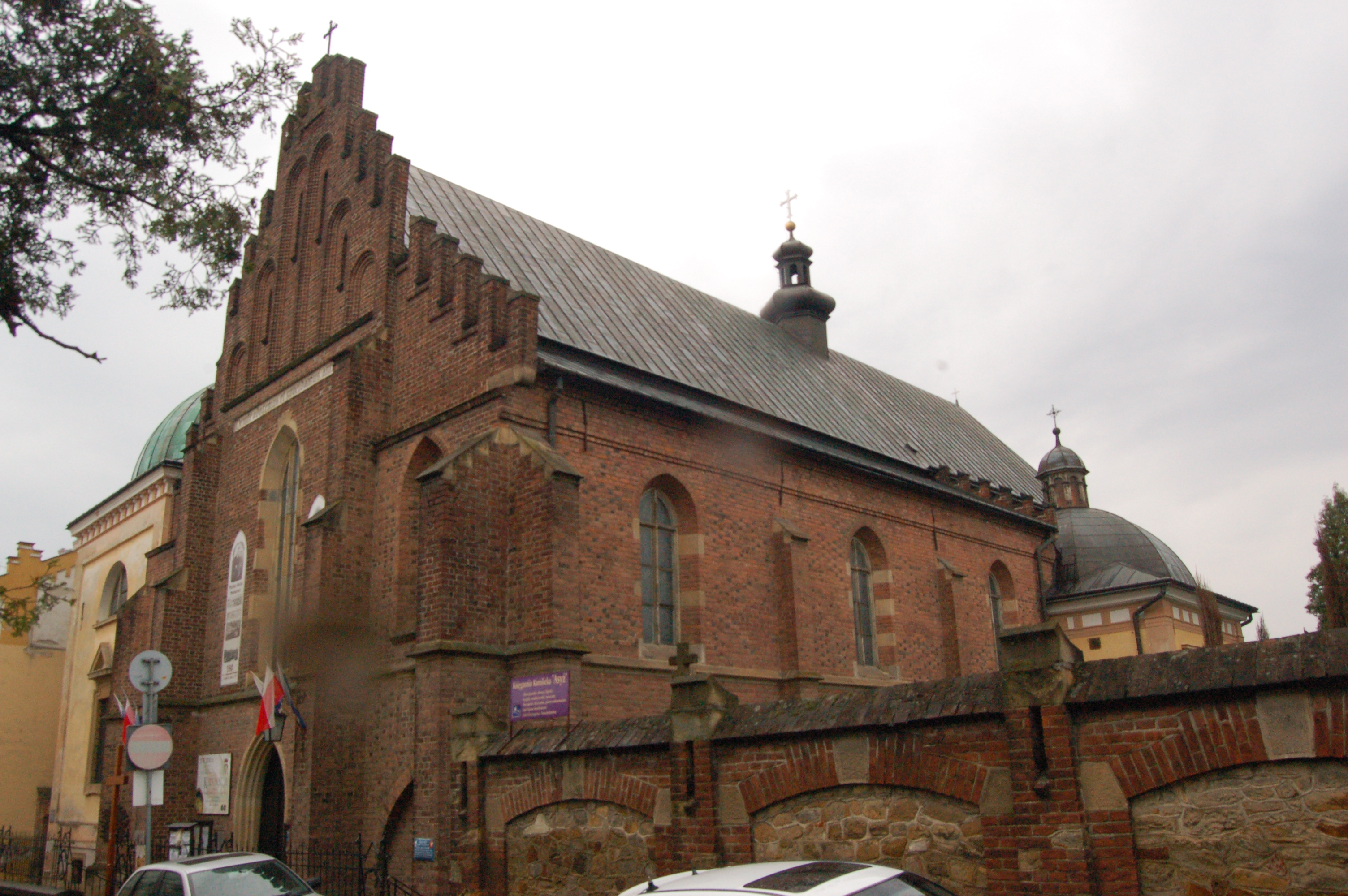
- The chapel is visible on the left.

General information
- Architectural style: Baroque
- Location: Krosno, Poland
- Construction started: May 2, 1647
- Completed: October 8, 1648
- Client: Stanisław Oświęcim

Design and construction
- Architect: Vincenzo Petroni

The Oświęcim Chapel (Polish: Kaplica Oświęcimów), dedicated to the Blessed Virgin Mary and St. Stanislaus of Szczepanów, is an extension to the Gothic Franciscan Church in Krosno (pl:Kościół i Klasztor oo. Franciszkanów w Krośnie), Poland. Founded in 1647–1648 by a prominent representative of the Oświęcim family, it is also commonly known as the "Chapel of Love" (Polish: Kaplica Miłości). Associated with the romantic legend of Stanisław Oświęcim's love for his sister Anna, the building is one of the finest artistic achievements of its era. It represents a type of early Baroque burial chapel built on a square plan, with a dome topped by a lantern inspired by the early Renaissance Sigismund's Chapel.

== Chapel ==
The Oświęcim Chapel was built from May 2, 1647 til October 8, 1648. The walls were adorned with portraits of Stanisław Oświęcim and Anna Oświęcimówna, their father Florian Oświęcim and his two wives Barbara z Szamotów Oświęcimowa and Regina ze Śląskich Oświęcimowa, along with a portrait of Jan Oświęcim vicecapitaneus, Bielsko cupbearer and the judge of Sanok.

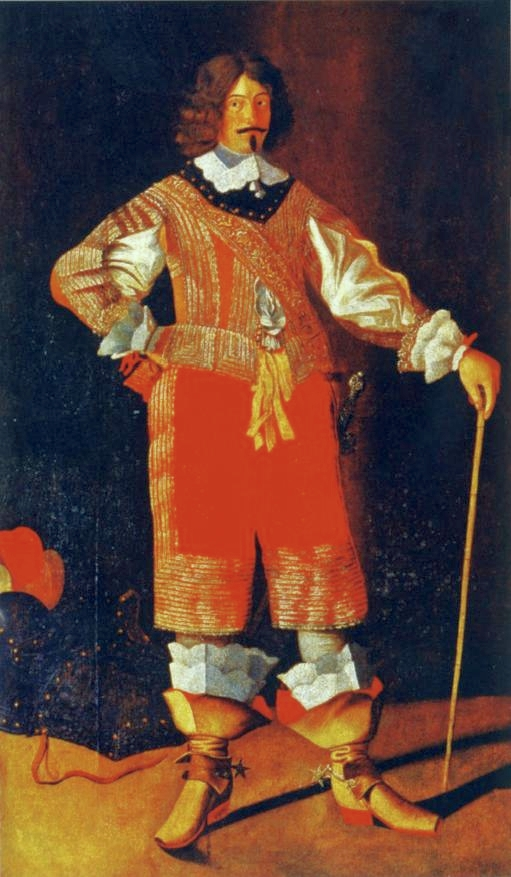
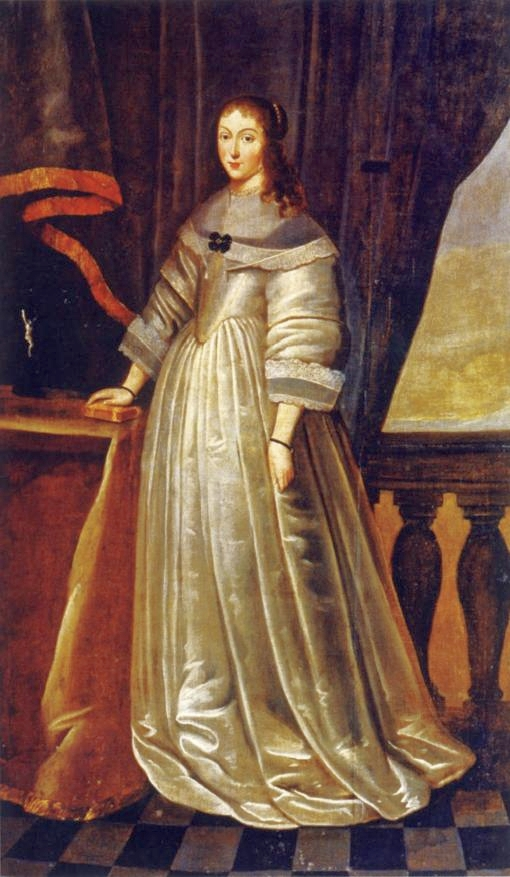
Portraits of Stanisław and Anna in the Chapel, painted by Mathias Czwiczek (1647–1648). Both dressed according to French fashion.

The designer of the chapel was Vincenzo Petroni from Milan. The rich stucco decoration was the work of the most outstanding stucco decorator of 17th-century Poland, Giovanni Battista Falconi. The chapel was built on a square plan, with a dome topped by a lantern. At the entrance, there is a richly carved marble portal and a decorative grille.

The elaborate floral designs are enriched with winged putti. The decoration of the interior is not typically religious as it glorifies the founding family. The coat of arms and military insignia invoke the Oświęcims' noble traditions.

The main furnishing is the altar from 1890 (a faithful copy of a mid-17th century original) with ornaments, woodcuts and paintings dating from the chapel's foundation. The central painting depicts St. Stanislaus resurrecting the deceased knight Piotr with Stanisław and Anna in the background.

The entrance to the crypt beneath the chapel is covered with large boards. The two coffins along the wall contain the remains of Stanisław's father and uncle. Four others were placed in small niches, the smallest coffin indicating the deceased was a child. The centre of the crypt houses the coffins of Anna and Stanisław.

== Legend ==
The inscription on the sepulchral chapel reads (in Latin) ... to God's eternal remembrance, dedicated to noble Anna z Kunowy Oświęcimówna, most beloved sister, from her most saddened and sorrowful brother Stanisław z Kunowy Oświęcim (...) as a sign of the eternal love that even death cannot stop, steeped in sadness and grief, also to his ancestors, successors and descendants, this chapel as a house of prayer for the living and a grave as a place of eternal rest for the dead, founded in the year 1647 from the birth of our Lord, gave rise to the legend of incestuous love between brother and sister, for the first time recorded in 1812. The legend gained in popularity over time, and the chapel itself became a popular tourist attraction. Couples who had married in the church descended into the crypt to be blessed with the love that united Anna and Stanisław.

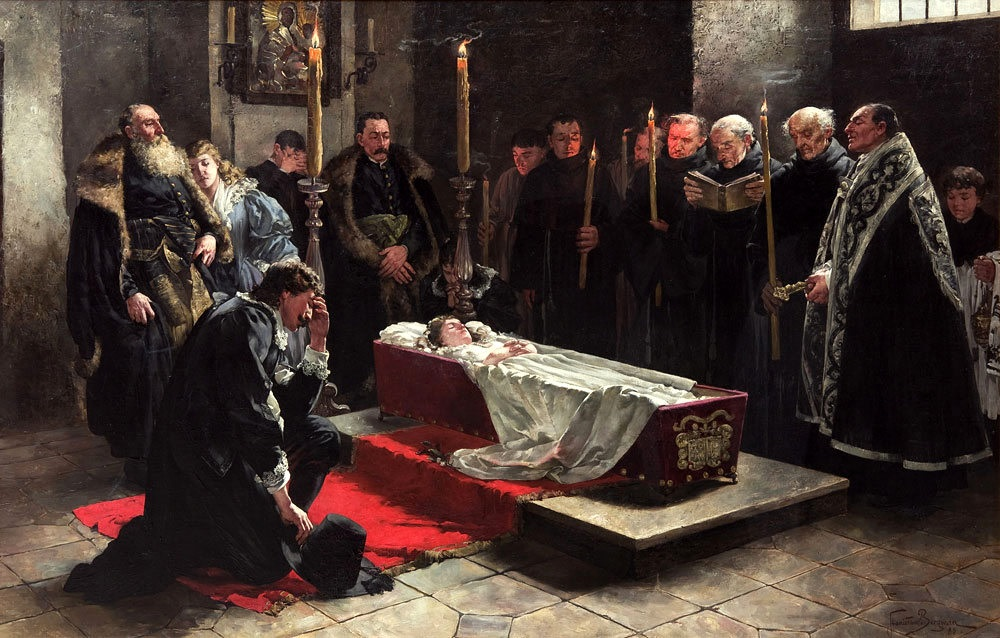
Stanisław Oświęcim at the Body of Anna Oświęcimówna by Stanisław Bergman (1888).

The story has many versions and many variants. According to the most popular version Stanisław, courtier of King Władysław IV Vasa after returning from his diplomatic missions, fell in love with his long lost younger sister. He went to Rome in order to obtain dispensation from the Pope to marry Anna. When he returned he found his sister dead. Some versions say that Anna was poisoned by his mother or by a rejected suitor, waiting for the return of her brother, or at the news that the Pope blessed their relationship (as marriages were forbidden to the seventh degree of kinship). Stanisław gave orders he should be buried next to her in the crypt beneath the chapel. Anna and Stanisław's coffins stand next to each other. So that he could see his beloved sister after death, he asked for a small glazed window to be added to his coffin.

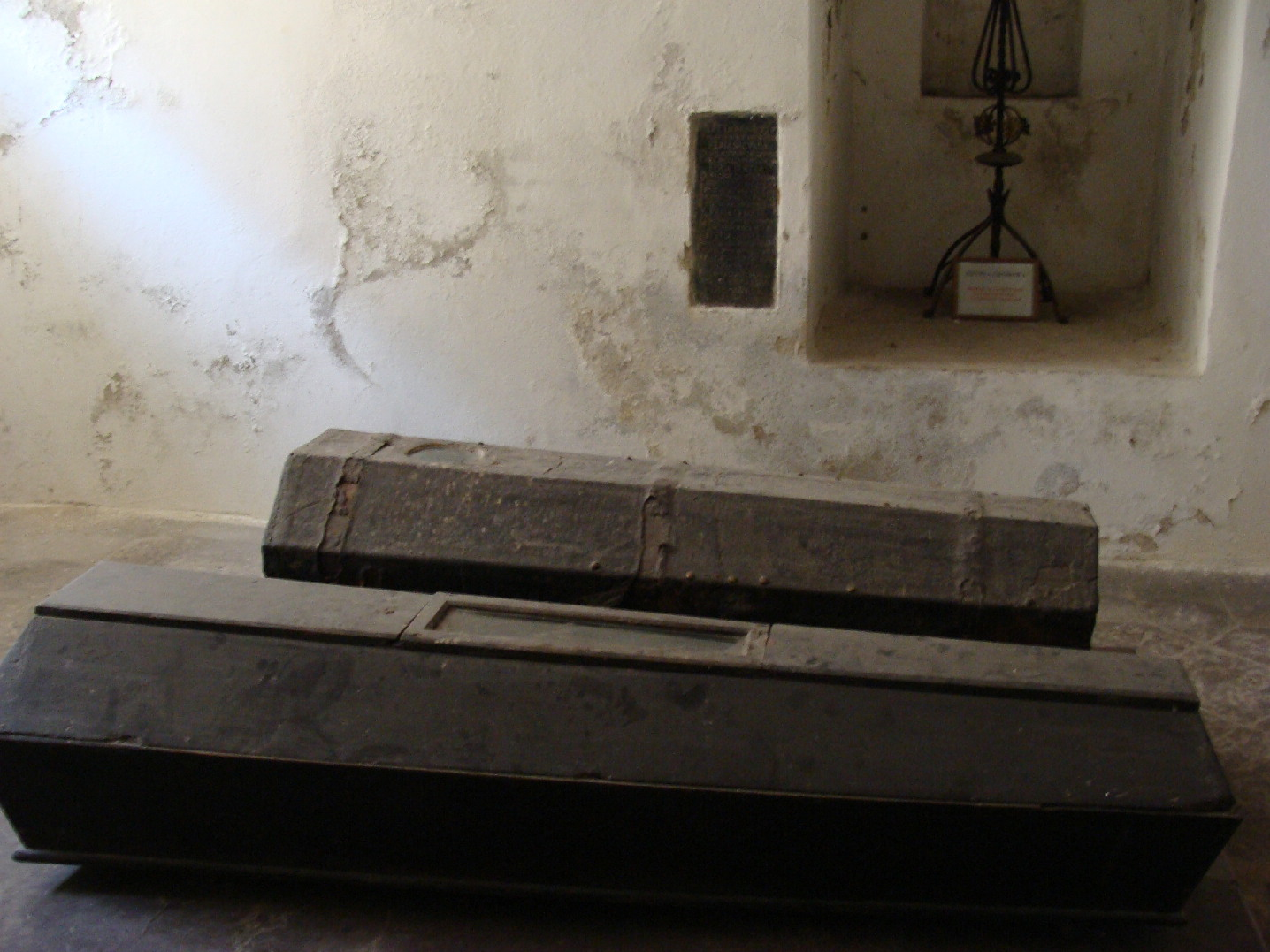
Coffins of Anna and Stanisław in the crypt.

Anna died on January 13, 1647, apparently as a result of tuberculosis or typhoid. The event is documented in a diary written by Stanisław Oświęcim, discovered in the 19th century. The fact that in February 1647 he attempted to become a Steward of Prince Sigismund Casimir Vasa may also indicate his imminent return to earthly reality and his need to seek solace. In the records there is no evidence of his intent to marry his sister, nor is there any mention of his alleged journey to Rome to obtain papal dispensation. Stanisław was still alive 10 years after his sister's death; he fought at Berestechko and during the Deluge, and died during the invasion of the Polish–Lithuanian Commonwealth by Prince George II Rákóczi of Transylvania in 1657.

== In popular culture ==
Numerous literary, artistic and musical works were based on the legend including Stanisław Jaszowski's Powieści historyczne polskie (Polish historical novels), Anna Libera's Stanisław i Anna Oświęcim, Mikołaj Boloz Antoniewicz's Poemat dramatyczny w 5 oddziałach, Anna Oświęcimówna, Mieczysław Karłowicz's symphonic poem Stanisław i Anna Oświęcimowie, poems by Mieczysław Jastrun and Miron Białoszewski, paintings and drawings by Artur Grottger, Jan Matejko and Stanisław Bergman and a movie by Kazimierz Konrad and Piotr Stefaniak Stanisław i Anna (1985).

== See also ==
- Baroque in Poland
- Coffin portrait
