= Kacper Bieszczad =

Polish footballer (born 2002)

Personal information
- Date of birth: 11 September 2002 (age 24)
- Place of birth: Krosno, Poland
- Height: 1.92 m (6 ft 4 in)
- Position: Goalkeeper

Team information
- Current team: Sogndal
- Number: 24

Youth career
- Beniaminek Krosno
- –2016: Karpaty Krosno
- 2016–2019: Zagłębie Lubin

Senior career*
Years	Team	Apps	(Gls)
2019–2025	Zagłębie Lubin II	41	(0)
2019–2025	Zagłębie Lubin	27	(0)
2020–2021	→ Chrobry Głogów (loan)	17	(0)
2023–2024	→ Raków Częstochowa (loan)	2	(0)
2023–2024	→ Raków Częstochowa II (loan)	18	(0)
2025	Vizela	0	(0)
2026–	Sogndal	0	(0)

International career
2017–2018	Poland U16	4	(0)
2019	Poland U17	4	(0)
2020	Poland U19	1	(0)
2021–2022	Poland U20	5	(0)
2022–2023	Poland U21	4	(0)
- * Club domestic league appearances and goals as of 00:18, 28 March 2026 (UTC)

Kacper Bieszczad (born 11 September 2002) is a Polish professional footballer who plays as a goalkeeper for Norwegian First Division club Sogndal.

== Club career ==
On 12 August 2020 he was loaned to Chrobry Głogów for the 2020–21 season. In 2023, he was loaned to Polish champions Raków Częstochowa, a UEFA Champions League contender. On 22 May 2024, Raków announced Bieszczad would depart the club upon the expiration of his loan deal, as they decided not to activate the buy option.

On 3 February 2025, Bieszczad moved to Portuguese side Vizela on a deal until the end of the season, with an option to extend. He left Vizela at the end of his contract in June 2025, without making an appearance for the senior team.

On 27 March 2026, Bieszczad signed with Norwegian second division outfit Sogndal until the end of the year.

== Charity work ==
At the start of the 2022–23 season, Bieszczad launched the Murowane pomaganie charity campaign, pledging to make a donation of PLN 1,000 for every clean sheet kept. Other goalkeepers, such as Legia Warsaw's Kacper Tobiasz, Raków Częstochowa's Vladan Kovačević, Wisła Płock's Krzysztof Kamiński and Ruch Chorzów's Jakub Bielecki, have also pledged to take part in the initiative. In December 2022, Bieszczad reported the campaign had gathered PLN 117,000 in donations.

== Career statistics ==
As of match played 30 November 2024

Appearances and goals by club, season and competition
Club	Season	League			National cup (Note: Includes Polish Cup)		Europe		Other		Total	
Club	Season	Division	Apps	Goals	Apps	Goals	Apps	Goals	Apps	Goals	Apps	Goals
Zagłębie Lubin II	2018–19	III liga, group III	7	0	—		—		—		7	0
Zagłębie Lubin II	2019–20	III liga, group III	14	0	1	0	—		—		15	0
Zagłębie Lubin II	2021–22	III liga, group III	8	0	—		—		—		8	0
Zagłębie Lubin II	2022–23	III liga, group III	9	0	—		—		—		9	0
Zagłębie Lubin II	2024–25	II liga	3	0	1	0	—		—		4	0
Zagłębie Lubin II	Total		41	0	2	0	—		—		43	0
Zagłębie Lubin	2019–20	Ekstraklasa	2	0	0	0	—		—		2	0
Zagłębie Lubin	2021–22	Ekstraklasa	10	0	0	0	—		—		10	0
Zagłębie Lubin	2022–23	Ekstraklasa	15	0	0	0	—		—		15	0
Zagłębie Lubin	Total		27	0	0	0	—		—		27	0
Chrobry Głogów (loan)	2020–21	I liga	17	0	1	0	—		—		18	0
Raków Częstochowa (loan)	2023–24	Ekstraklasa	2	0	0	0	0	0	0	0	2	0
Raków Częstochowa II (loan)	2023–24	III liga, group III	18	0	—		—		—		18	0
Vizela	2024–25	Liga Portugal 2	0	0	—		—		—		0	0
Sogndal	2026	Norwegian First Division	0	0	—		—		—		0	0
Career total			105	0	3	0	0	0	0	0	108	0

== Honours ==
Zagłębie Lubin II

- III liga, group III: 2021–22
- Polish Cup (Lower Silesia regionals): 2018–19
- Polish Cup (Legnica regionals): 2018–19
