= Krosno Glass =

Polish glassware manufacturer

Krosno
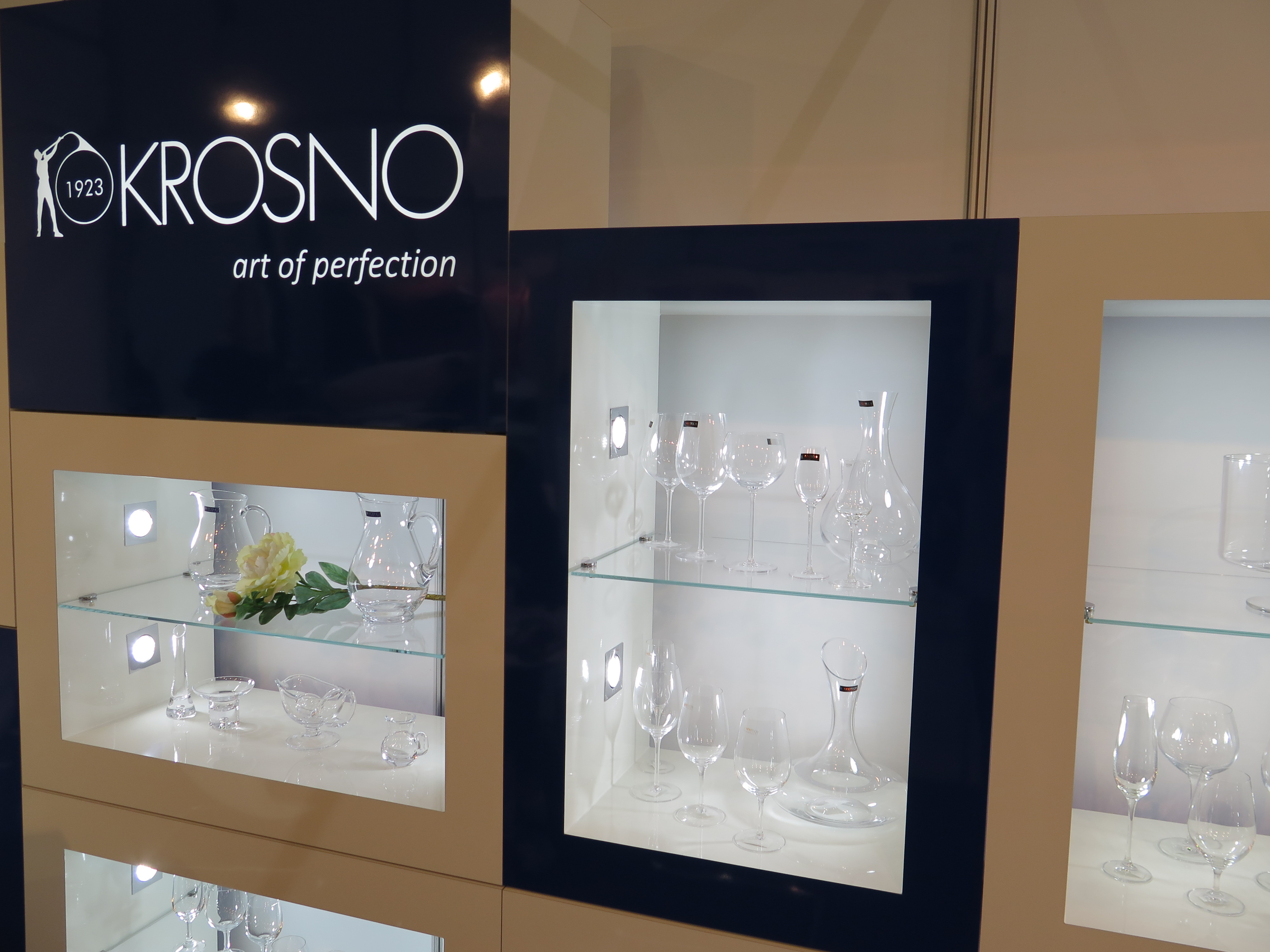
- Industry: Glassware, crystalware
- Predecessor: Krośnieńskie Huty Szkła "Krosno" (KHS)
- Founded: 1923; 103 years ago
- Headquarters: Krosno, Poland
- Key people: Stefan Maciejewski (Chairman & CEO)
- Products: Luxury goods
- Owner: Coast2Coast
- Website: krosno.com

Krosno Glass S.A., commonly known as Krosno, is a glassware and crystalware company from Poland. It has been in operation since 1923 and specializes in the production of high-quality glass accessories or liquid vessels such as jugs, vases, carafes, decanters and chalices as well as stemware and tumblers for serving spirits. The products are available in over 60 countries worldwide.

The name of the firm relates to the town of Krosno, in southeastern Poland, where the glassworks and manufacturing facilities are currently situated. Each individual piece is handmade by expert glassblowers, artists and now higher technology. The modern and futuristic design of the glassware manufactured by Krosno is based on the concept of minimalism.

The company was acquired by Coast2Coast Capital in 2016 for 121 million Polish złoty.

== See also ==
- Bohemian glass
- List of companies of Poland
- Bolesławiec pottery, also known as Polish pottery
