= Seweryn Bieszczad =

Polish painter (1852–1923)

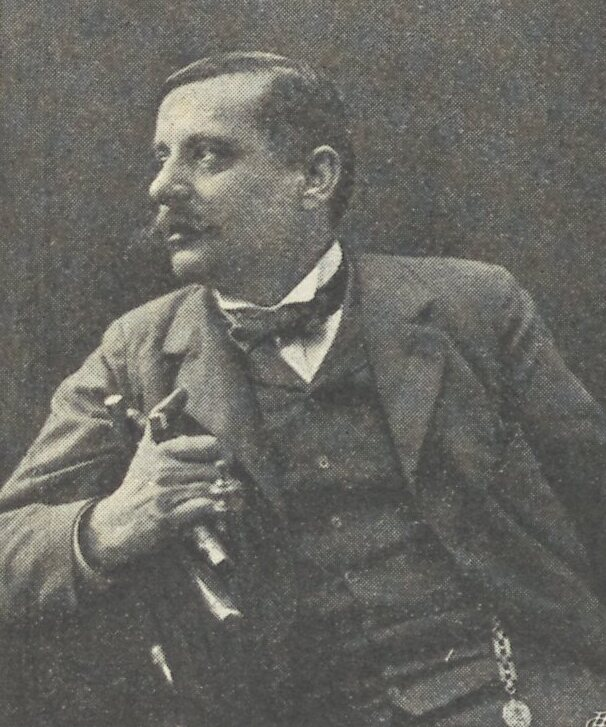

Seweryn Bieszczad (18 November 1852 – 17 June 1923) was a Polish painter. He was noted for his sense of realism and use of watercolor in painting primarily landscapes.

He was born in Jasło on 18 November 1852 into a family of painters. He studied at the School of Fine Arts in Kraków between the years 1868 - 1876, under the direction of Wladyslaw Łuszczkiewicz, and then Jan Matejko, and participated in the classes conducted by Leon Dembowski and Feliks Szynalewski. Later, he studied at the Academy of Fine Arts in Munich under the direction of A. Wagner and in Dresden as a fellow at the Vienna Academy.

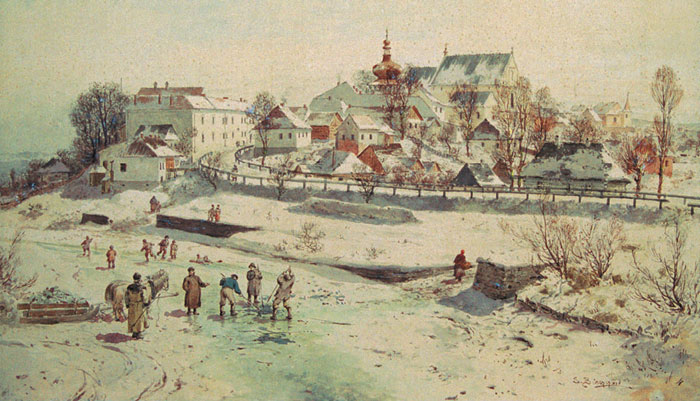
A painting of Krosno

In 1891, on the advice of friends, he moved permanently to Krosno, where he lived until the end of his life (with the exception of years 1920 - 1923, when he was in Pleszew (woiwodship Poznań). In Krosno has been an active member of committees of artistic works and artistic associations. It was in Krosno that he painted a high number of landscapes of the town and surroundings. He died on 17 June 1923, in Krosno.
