= Stanisław Bergman =

Polish painter (1862–1930)

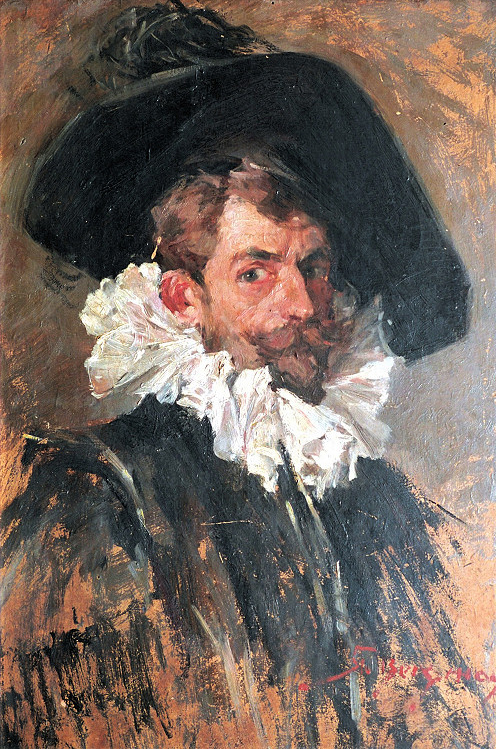
Self-portrait in Spanish Costume (1925)

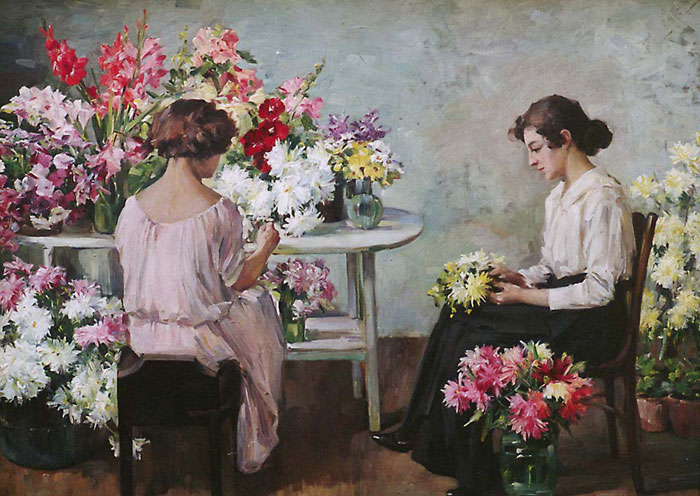
Florists (ca. 1900)

Stanisław Wojciech Bergman (13 April 1862 – 28 August 1930) was a Polish painter of historical scenes, genre scenes, portraits and still-lifes.

== Biography ==
He was born in Krosno to a wealthy bourgeois family. From 1879 to 1885, he studied at the Kraków Academy of Fine Arts with Jan Matejko, who had a decisive influence on his style. He then won a scholarship that allowed him to study at the Academy of Fine Arts, Munich, from 1885 to 1887. by Otto Seitz and Sandor Wagner.

When he returned to Kraków, he received a small workshop at the Academy, where he assisted Matejko with his classes in composition and was awarded a degree in 1888. Three years later, he went back to Krosno, where he was married and began to turn away from historical themes. He also joined the Sokol gymnastic movement and became one of the first members of "Sztuka", an art society.

From 1909 to the end of World War I, he and his family lived in Vienna. When they once again returned to Krosno, they moved into a house designed for them by Jan Sas Zubrzycki, which still retains some of Bergman's decorative touches.

In additional to historical paintings, he created portraits of eminent townspeople and fashionable ladies and was fond of painting flowers. In his later years, under the influence of Impressionism, his palette brightened considerably. He died in Krosno in 1930. Many of his works are in the National Museum, Krakow, and the Museum of Independence (historical scenes). A major retrospective was held at the "Muzeum Podkarpackie" (Sub-Carpathian Museum) in Krosno from 2010 to 2011.
