= Krosno =

- Town county
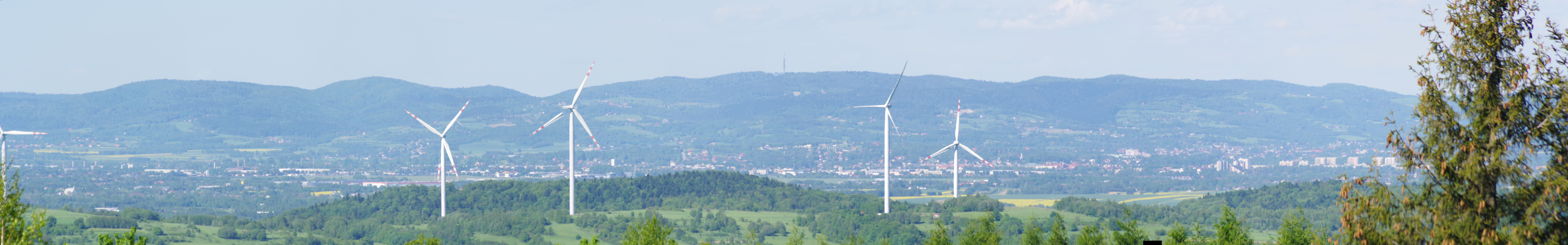
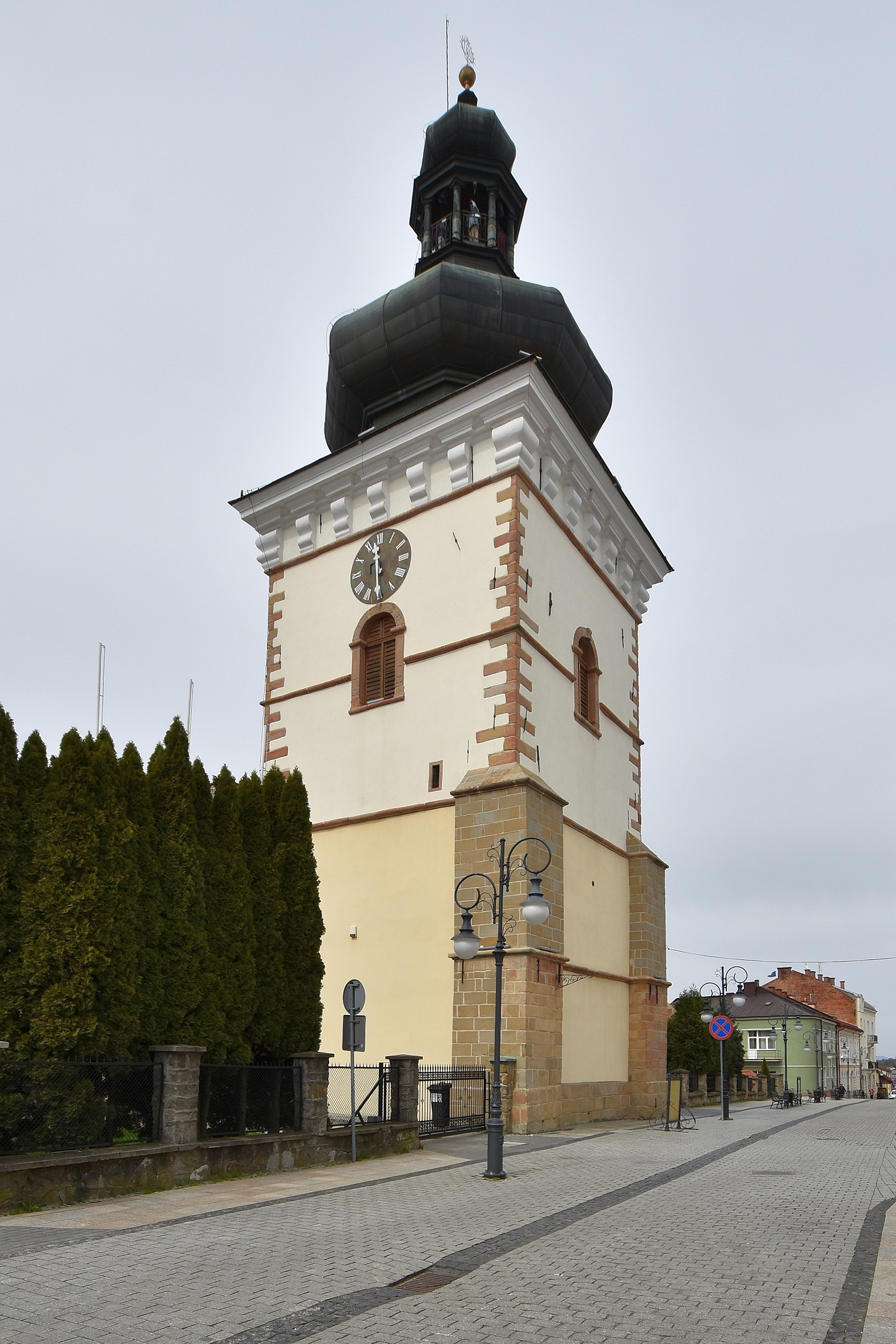
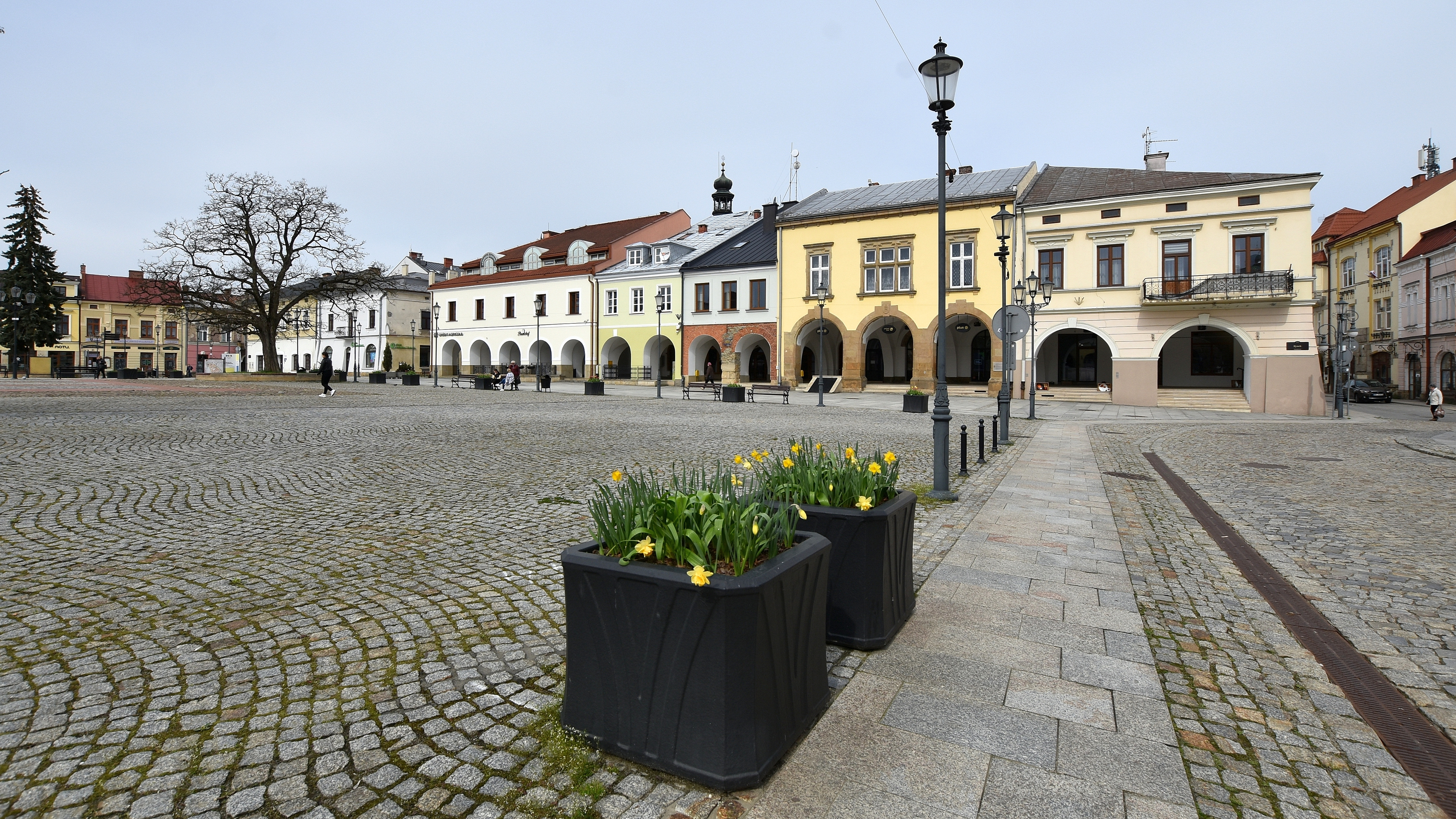
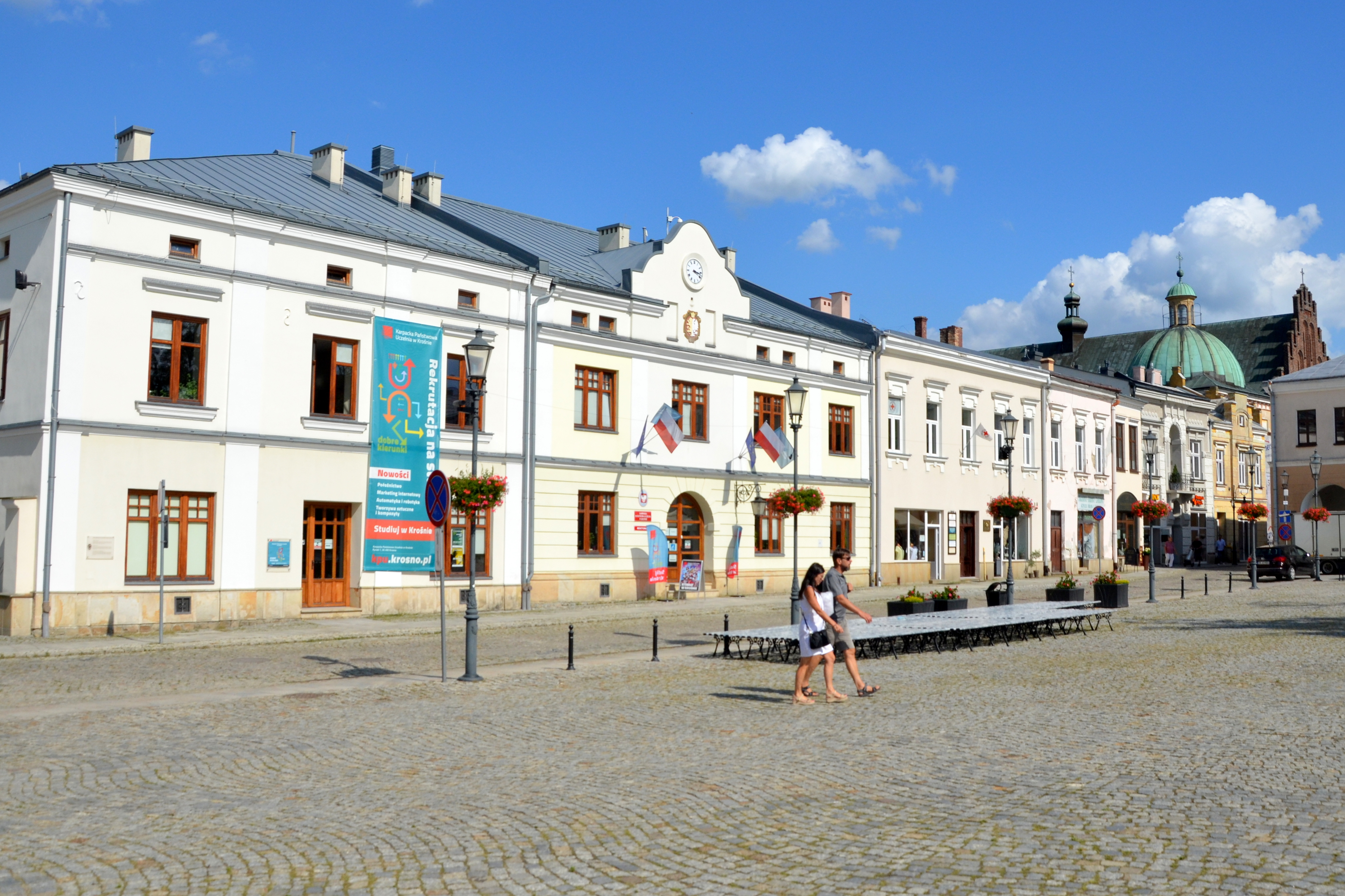
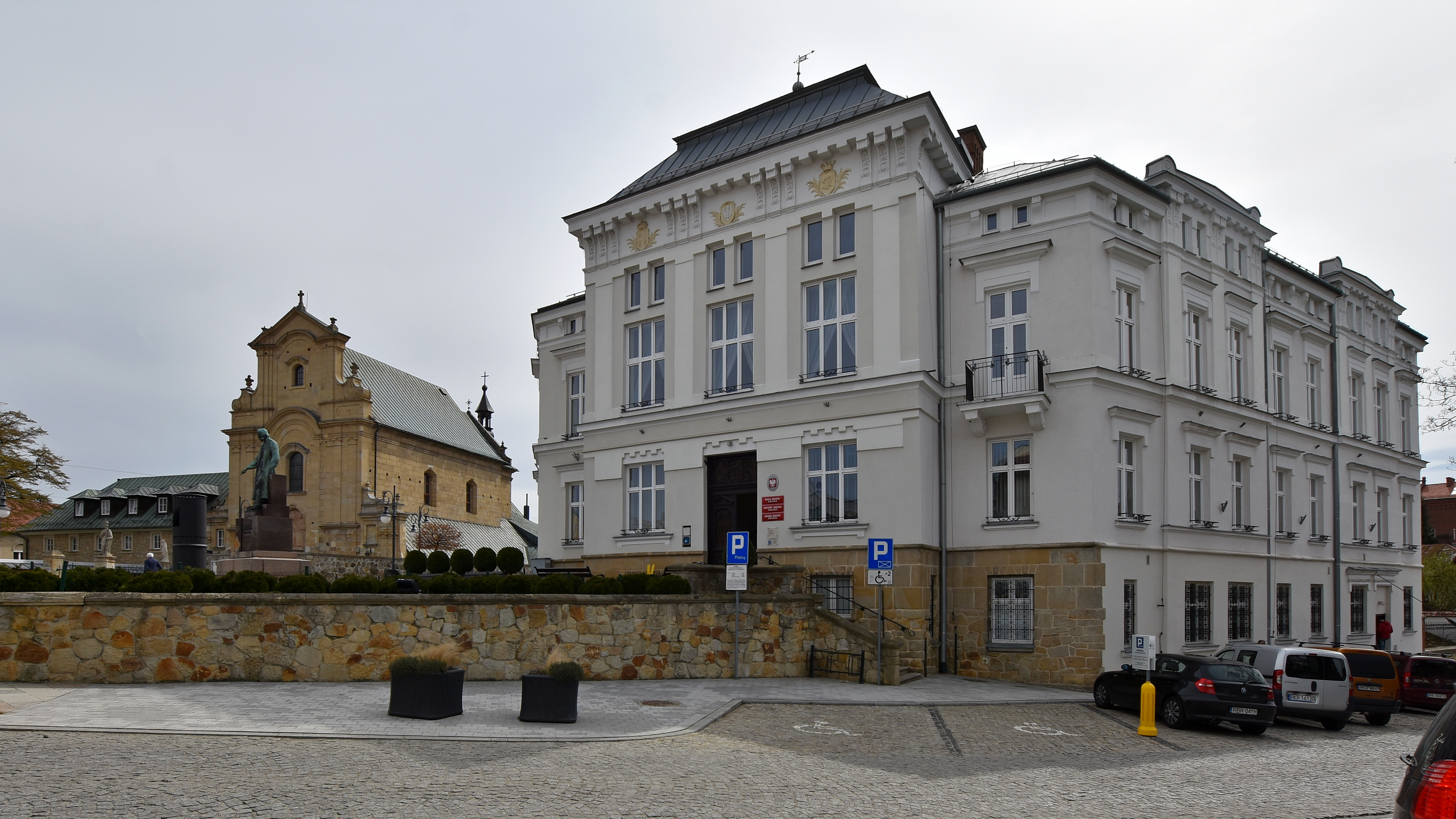
- View from Franków Hill Bell Tower Historic town center and market State Academy Town Hall

- Flag Coat of arms
- Nickname: Parva Cracovia (Little Kraków)
- Motto(s): Niepowtarzalne miasto w wyjatkowym miejscu Unique town in an uncommon place
- Location within Poland
- Coordinates: 49°41′N 21°45′E
- Country: Poland
- Voivodeship: Subcarpathian
- County: town county
- Town rights: 1342

Government
  - President: Piotr Przytocki (2002–present)

Area
  - Total: 44.7 km^{2} (17.3 sq mi)
- Elevation: 260 m (850 ft)

Population (2014)
  - Total: 43,594
  - Density: 975/km^{2} (2,530/sq mi)
- Demonym(s): Krosnian; Polish: Krośnianin (m); Krośnianka (f); Krośnianie (pl) KROSNOludki (pl, humorous endonym campaign; pun on krasnoludki – "gnomes")
- Time zone: UTC+1 (CET)
  - Summer (DST): UTC+2 (CEST)
- Postal code: 38-400 to 38-411
- Area code: +48 13
- Car plates: RK, YK
- Website: http://www.krosno.pl/

Krosno [ˈkrɔsnɔ] (in full The Royal Free Town of Krosno, Polish: Królewskie Wolne Miasto Krosno) is a town and county in the Subcarpathian Voivodeship, in southeastern Poland. As of 2024, the population of the town county was 43,594, with the surrounding wider Krosno County having 108,922 inhabitants.

Krosno is a medieval fortified town, a former Royal Free Town and centre of cloth, linen, canvas, baize and Hungarian wine trade. Nicknamed Parva Cracovia ("Little Kraków"), Krosno contains a preserved old town with architecture in various styles, including Gothic, Renaissance and Baroque and several museums. It is also notable for its glassmaking traditions, which became known as the Krosno Glassware. It is a centre of motorcycle speedway racing.

== Etymology ==
Scholars have put forward several interpretations of the town's etymology. The town's name is identical to the Polish word for "weaving loom" (Polish: krosno).

However, a more likely origin for the name is the Proto-Slavic root *korsta/*krosta meaning a blotch or scab, which in Polish yielded the word krosta meaning a pimple or pustule, reflecting the rolling and hilly landscape of the Jasło-Sanok Pits and Carpathian foothills. The fading of the phoneme "t" when preceded by a sibilant is consistent with the regional dialect and toponymy, eg. Miestce became Miesce (now Miejsce Piastowe). This is supported by morphological evidence, such as the fact that the nearby village Krościenko Wyżne and a part of the town of Krosno, Krościenko Niżne, likely share its etymology, and these display a pattern consistent with the locally prevalent toponymical practice of forming diminutives from the name of a nearby settlement (eg. Łubno Szlacheckie/Łubno Opace and Łubienko) – furthermore, the morpheme –cien displays a fossilized "t" (palatalized as ć/ci), allowing one to reconstruct an older form: *krostьno. The toponymical practices in the area also point towards a possible Ruthenian origin for the name, pre-dating the wider Polish settlement of the area under Casimir III the Great.

Another theory claims that the original Polish or Ruthenian name disappeared and the existing name is the result of a transformation of the German (see: Walddeutsche) name "Krossen".

== History ==
=== Middle Ages ===
The first mention of the town, which names Krosno as one of 34 estates in Lesser Poland granted to the Bishopric of Lubusz, appears in a document signed by High Duke of Poland Leszek II the Black in 1282. However, the oldest traces of settlement in the fork of the Wisłok and Lubatówka Rivers, found during archaeological research, date back to the 10th and 11th centuries. The area was inhabited by the old Polish tribe of Lendians.

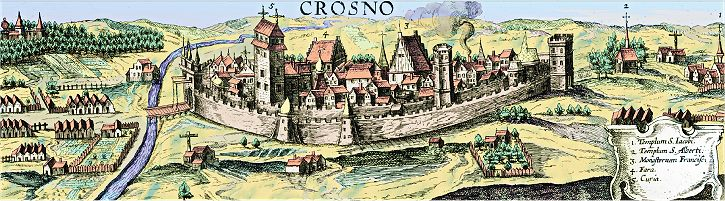
Krosno in 1618

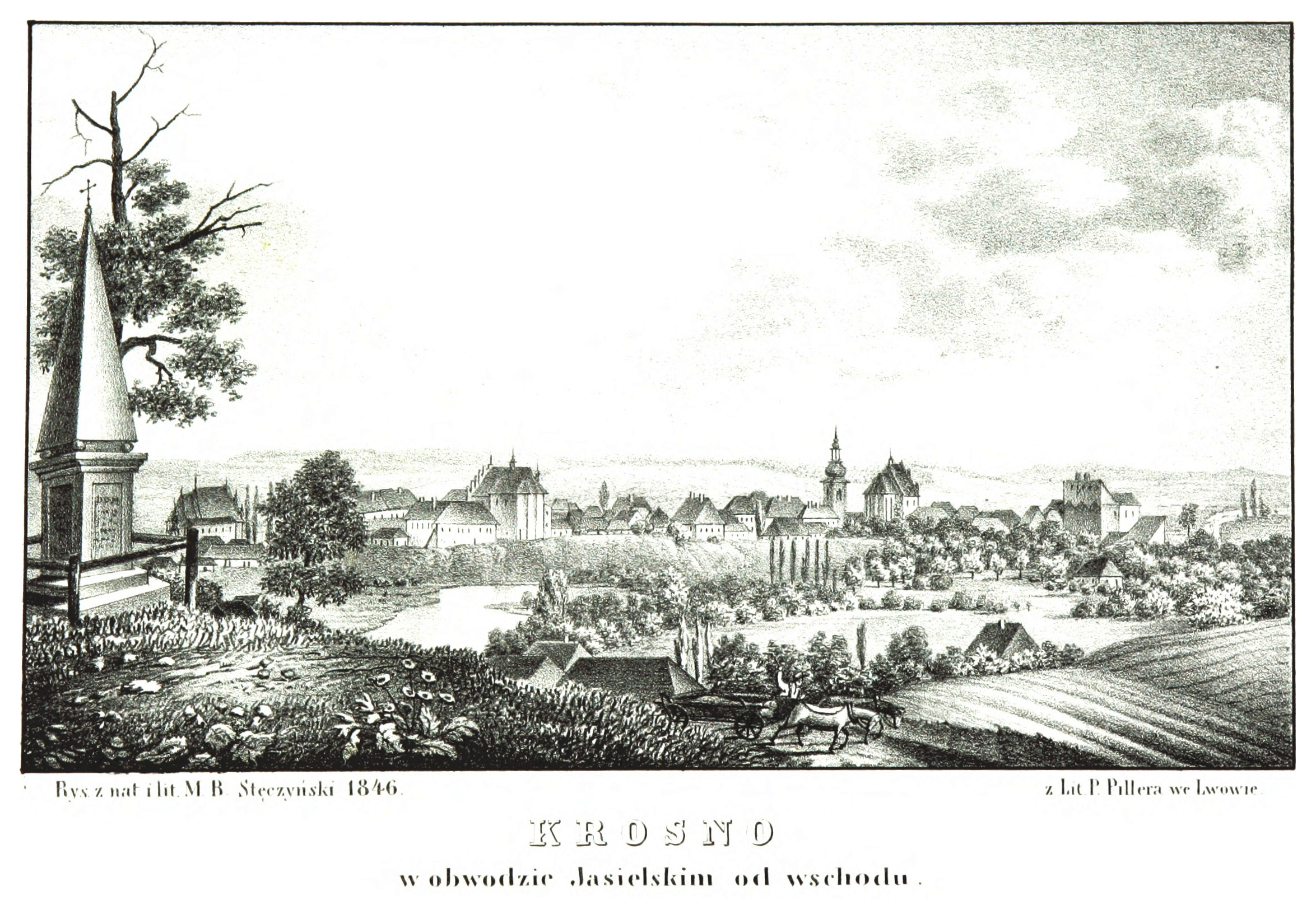
Krosno in 1846/47

The date of the first foundation charter, of the town is not known, though we may presume that the oldest preserved royal document of Casimir the Great, dating from 1367, regarding the sale of the Krosno aldermanship, was modelled on an earlier foundation act. Hence it should be assumed that about the middle of the 14th century, King Casimir transformed Krosno from a settlement, into a town chartered according to the Magdeburg rights and brought in numerous groups of German settlers.

Krosno, a royal town from its origins, used the coat of arms of the Kuyavian branch of the Piast dynasty (half an eagle and half a lion with a crown over their heads) and, owing to the king's foundation, was surrounded with a defensive wall as early as the 14th century. During the reign of Casimir III the Great the construction of stone fortifications was begun to encircle the hill. But it was only under King Władysław II Jagiełło that the full-length stone and partly earth town fortifications were completed. Two gates led into the town: the Hungarian one from the south-east and the Kraków one from the north-west. The well-fortified and secure town provided perfect conditions for the development of craft and trade. The statutes of the butchers guild were known as early as 1403 and in the middle of the 15th century the guilds of bakers, shoemakers, tailors, blacksmiths as well as clothiers and fullers were constituted. Krosno became an important production centre of cloths and fustians.

The medieval town had waterworks and a sewage system, which is evidence of its importance and the wealth of its inhabitants. The privilege granted by King Casimir IV Jagiellon in 1461 shows that Krosno, next to Kraków and Lwów, was the third town in the Kingdom of Poland with such facilities. The archaeological research conducted recently, based on the dendrochronological method, enabled scholars to move the date of the system's installation back to the middle of the 14th century. The pipe-line master dealt with repairs and maintenance of the whole water-supply and sewage systems. From the research conducted by the Krosno archaeologists it appears that the system was used until the beginning of the 19th century.

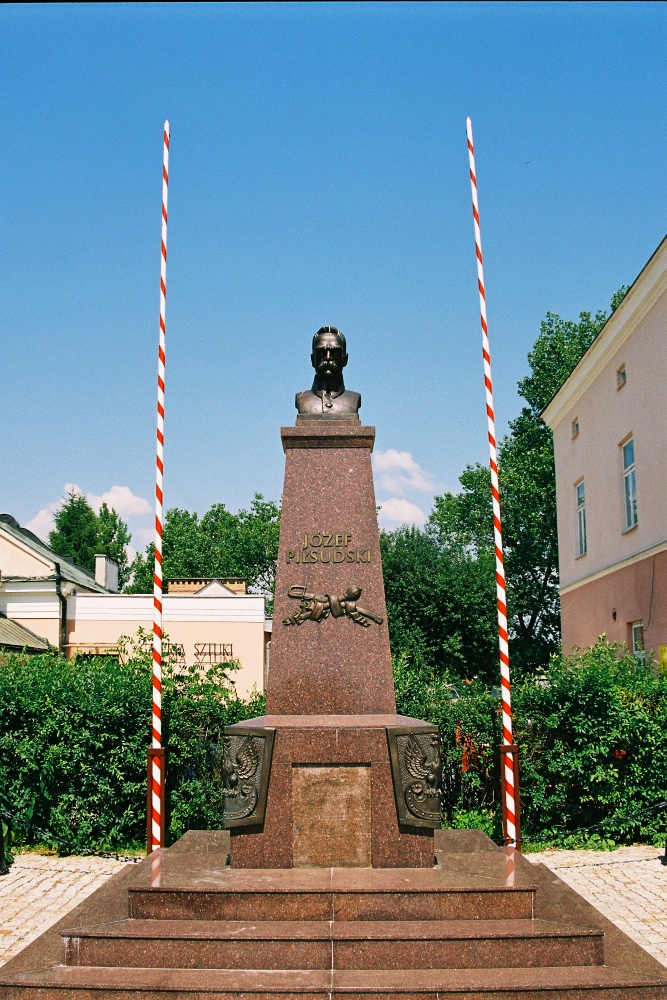
Monument to Józef Piłsudski.

The 15th century meant the beginning of commerce development for Krosno. Apart from local trade during weekly Monday fairs the town participated in a large-scale import-export and transit commerce. The main trade routes led to the Red Ruthenia, Hungary and the countries of southern Europe. The largest transactions were made during yearly fairs held three times a year. The trade was mainly in local cloths and baizes, horses, cattle, copperware and imported commodities made of copper and iron, and obviously, in Hungarian wine, on which several Krosno merchant families made fortunes. The first Jews to settle in Krosno were the brothers Nechemia and Lazar of Regensburg who received special permits from the Polish King, Władysław II Jagiełło in the 15th century.

=== Early modern era ===
In spite of natural disasters (flood in 1497, the fire of a suburb in 1474 and of the town in 1500), Thomas Tarczay's troops raids (1473 and 1474), pestilence, which nearly depopulated the town, the 16th century was the most favourable for the development of Krosno. The town had its own bleachery, fullery, brickyard, flour mill, municipal baths, it enjoyed the royal privilege for limestone excavation, it had the customs chamber and the right of storage of commodities. High standards of living in Krosno, called at that time parva Cracovia, resulted partially from the activity of the local parish school. In the years 1400–1600 173 natives of Krosno studied in the Kraków Academy, which is evidenced by the entries in Album studiosorum.

Krosno of the 16th century was renowned not only for the wealth of its inhabitants, thrift and wide commercial contacts. It was also one of the most populous towns in the province of Lesser Poland: the population is estimated at 4 thousand. The view of Krosno was included in the work of J. Braun and F. Hoghenberg entitled ‘The Towns of the World’, published in Cologne in 1617 or in Andreas Cellarius's work entitled ‘Regin Poloniae Magnique Ducatus Lithuaniae omniumque regionum subiectorum novissima descriptio’, published in Amsterdam in 1659.

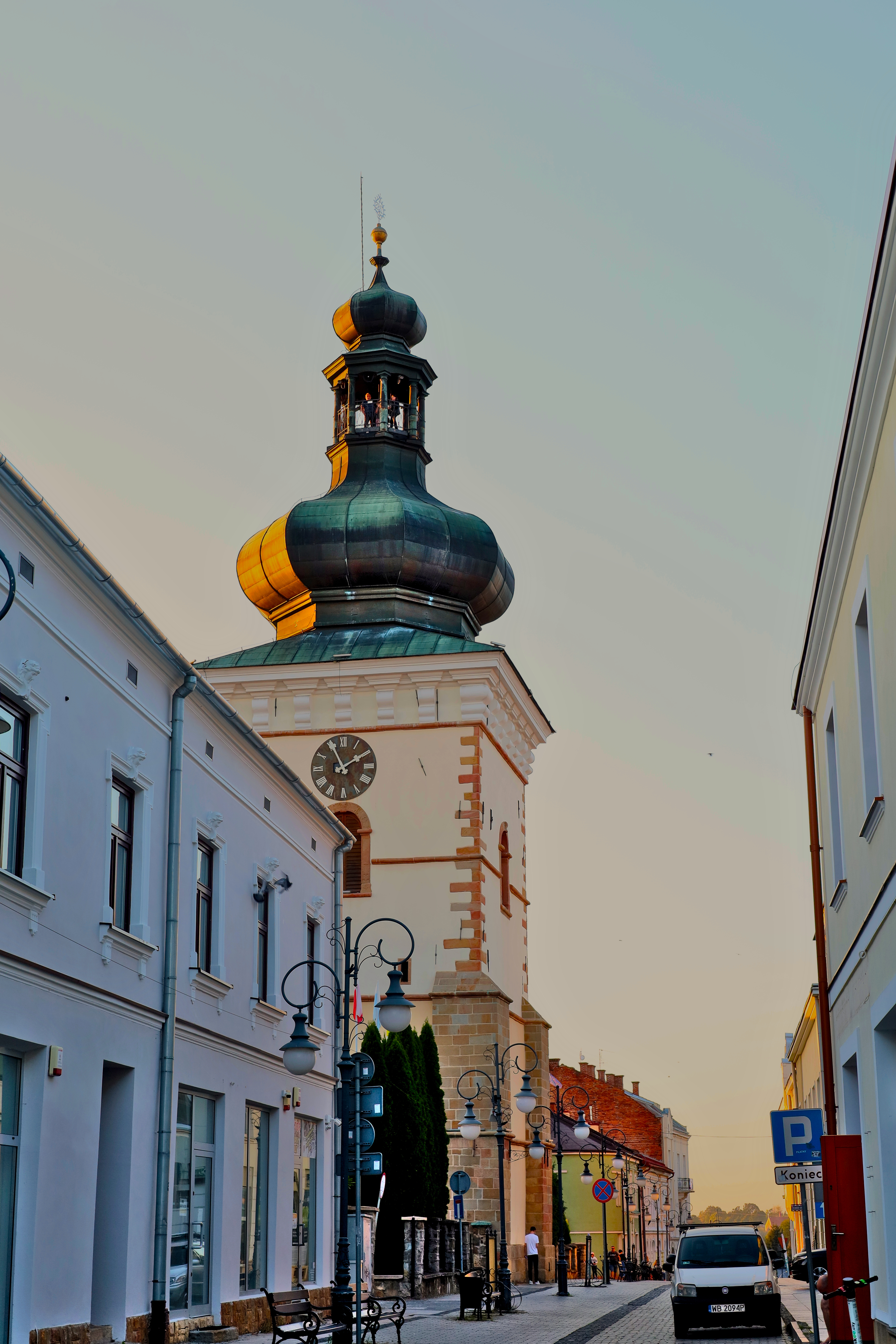
Bell tower of the Holy Trinity Church

At the beginning of the 17th century there were about 11 collective guilds in which craftsmen representing 79 production and service trades were associated. Apart from traditional specialities connected with basic functions of the town there were also goldsmiths, painters, comb-makers, armourers, pavers, leather-dressers, violin makers and soapboilers. But it was commerce that provided the town with most revenues, both from goods exchange and from services for visiting merchants. Local clerks, scribes, innkeepers, brewers, and even townspeople providing accommodation and letting shops and cellars earned a lot. Higher donations were given to the clergy for church expenses. At that time many Hungarian merchants settled in Krosno, mainly those trading in wine. Scots, who specialised in large-scale commerce, also came to stay and the most outstanding person among them was Robert Porteous, a wine trader from Langside, Dalkeith, who used his wealth to become a benefactor of institutions within the town. There were also Armenians and Ruthenians from Lwów, but the most numerous group of traders were Jews, although Krosno had a privilege ‘de non tolerandis Judeis’, barring Jews from residing and trading within the town walls. Jewish traders living in nearby townships of Korczyna, Rymanów or Dukla were frequently jailed and their wares confiscated for attempting to enter Krosno.

The middle of the 17th century witnessed the beginning of a gradual loss of the earlier position of the town. Natural disasters, raids of the Swedish, Transylvanian, and Tartar troops, pestilences and war requisitions brought Krosno to a desperate state at the end of 17th century.

=== 19th century and interbellum ===
In the time of the partitions of Poland and under the Austrian rule, once rich and important, the town experienced a period of severe impoverishment. It became one of many small towns of Galicia. Weaving was the only handicraft which enjoyed prosperity at that time. Large-scale flax and hemp plantations provided work for many weaving shops near Krosno. Korczyna and Kombornia were the strongest centres of this industry but there were thousands of home weaving shops in the vicinity of Krosno.

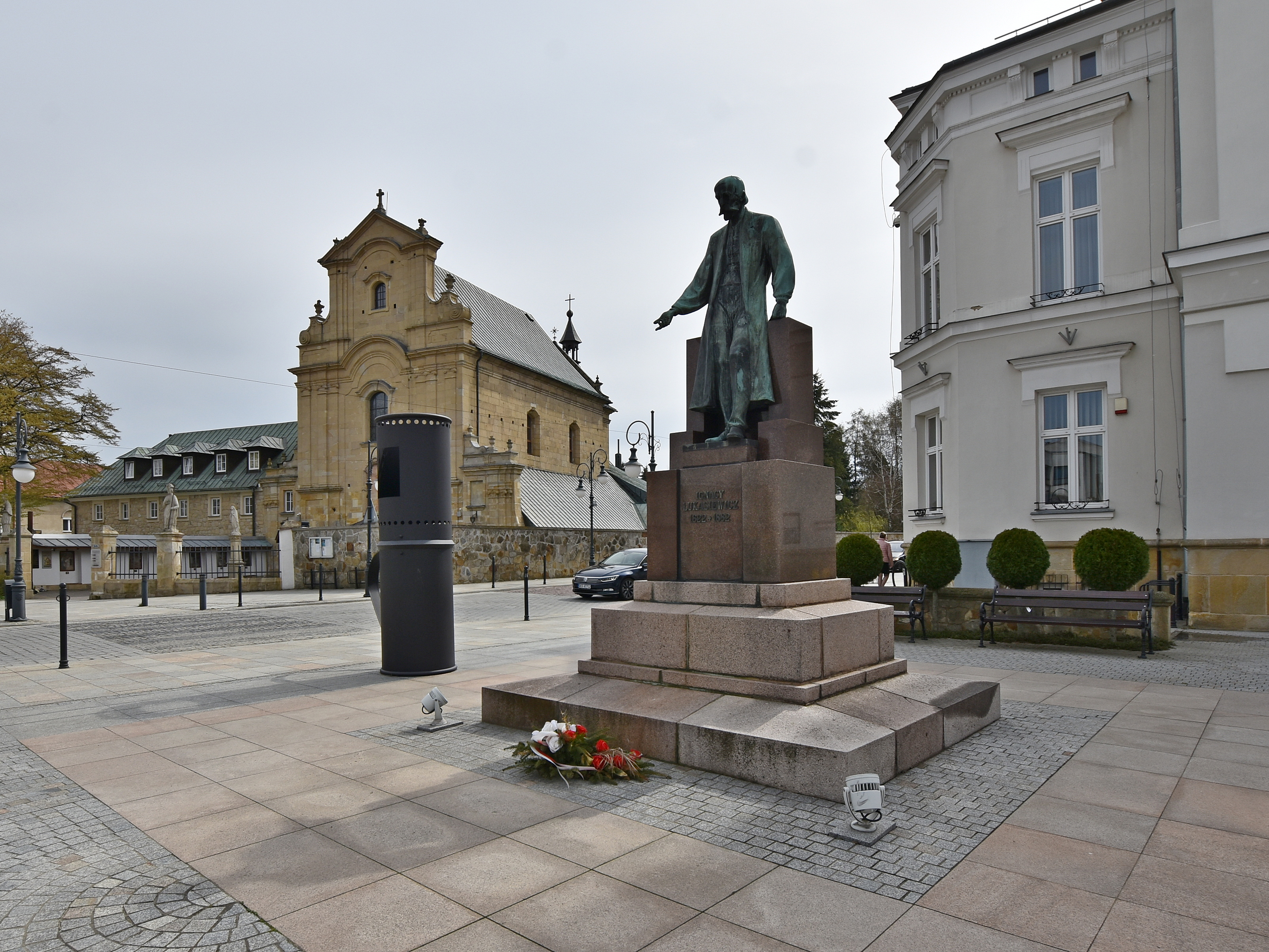
Monument to inventor Ignacy Łukasiewicz, pioneer of the global oil industry

It was not until the middle of the 19th century, the period of the Galician autonomy from 1867 to the outbreak of the World War I, that Krosno started to rise from the decline. The birth of Polish oil industry undoubtedly contributed to the notable and rapid increase of importance of the town. The first oil company started by Ignacy Łukasiewicz, Tytus Trzecielski and Karol Klobassa in 1856 and the refinery they erected in Chorkówka caused gradual inflow of foreign capital. As a results of the new administrative division the Krosno district (powiat) was established and in 1867 Krosno became the seat of the offices of the district authorities (starostwo). At the turn of the 20th century many societies, schools and institutions were established in the town: Loan Society, Nationwide Weaving School, Teacher Training School, Real Secondary School, "Zgoda" (Accord) Townspeople's Society, "Sokół" (Falcon) Gymnastic Society, Bleach and Finish Plant, an oil refinery, the First Domestic Factory of Tower Clocks. This state of relative progress lasted until the outbreak of World War I.

During the war Krosno suffered serious damages. The inhabitants of the town, bombed and looted several times, suffered both from the Austrian and the Russian troops. After the war, in 1918, Poland regained independence and control of the town. In interwar Poland, Krosno was a county seat administratively located in the Lwów Voivodeship, and the town evolved gradually into an important industrial centre: a licence was issued to establish a flax straw breaking plant and a linen weaving plant, in the 1920s Polish Glass Factory, Joint-Stock Company was set up, in 1928 the construction of the airfield was begun and the aviation school was moved to Krosno from Bydgoszcz, in the 1930s the hangars were erected.

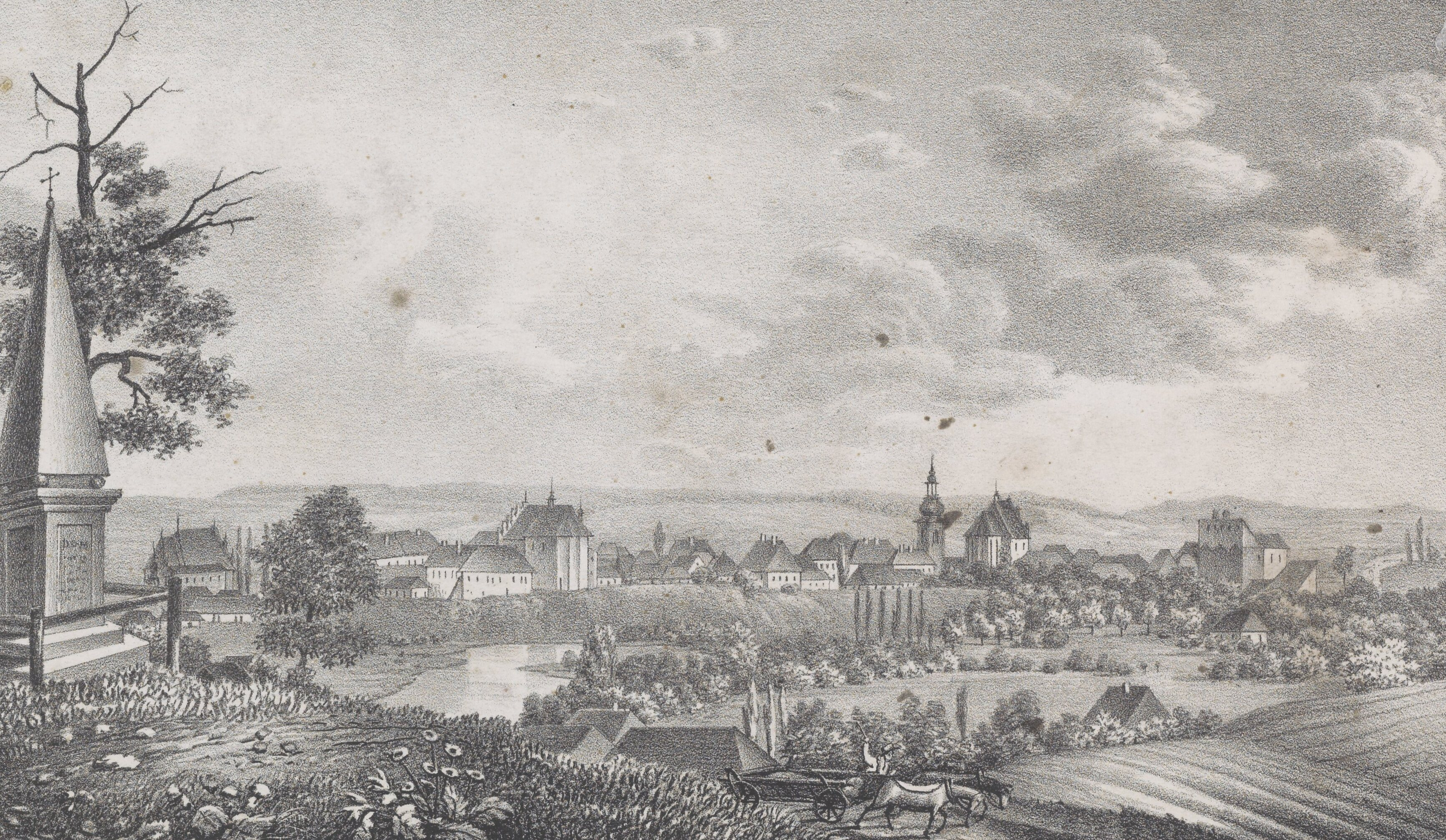
Krosno, 1846

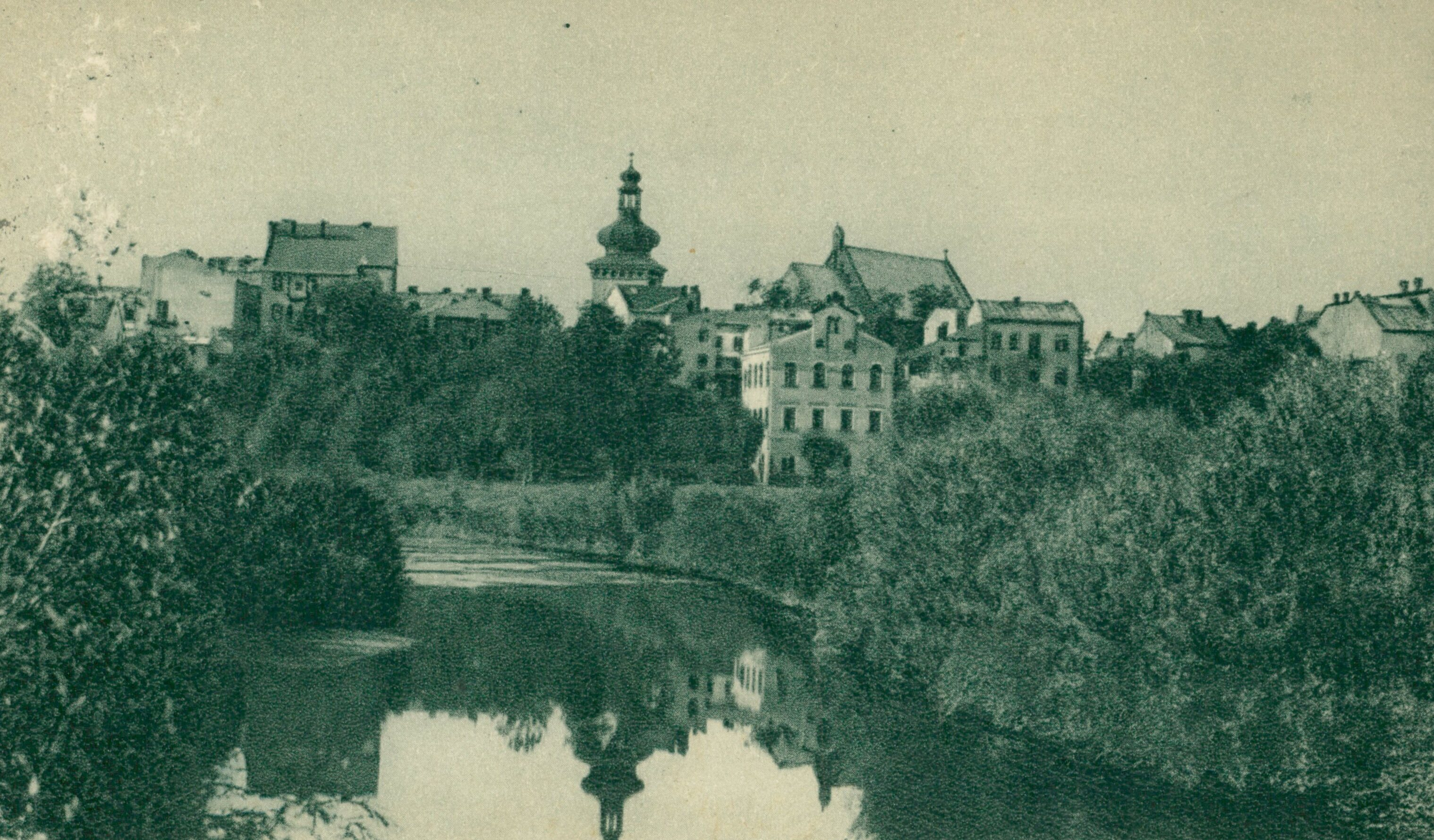
View from river Wisłok, before 1934

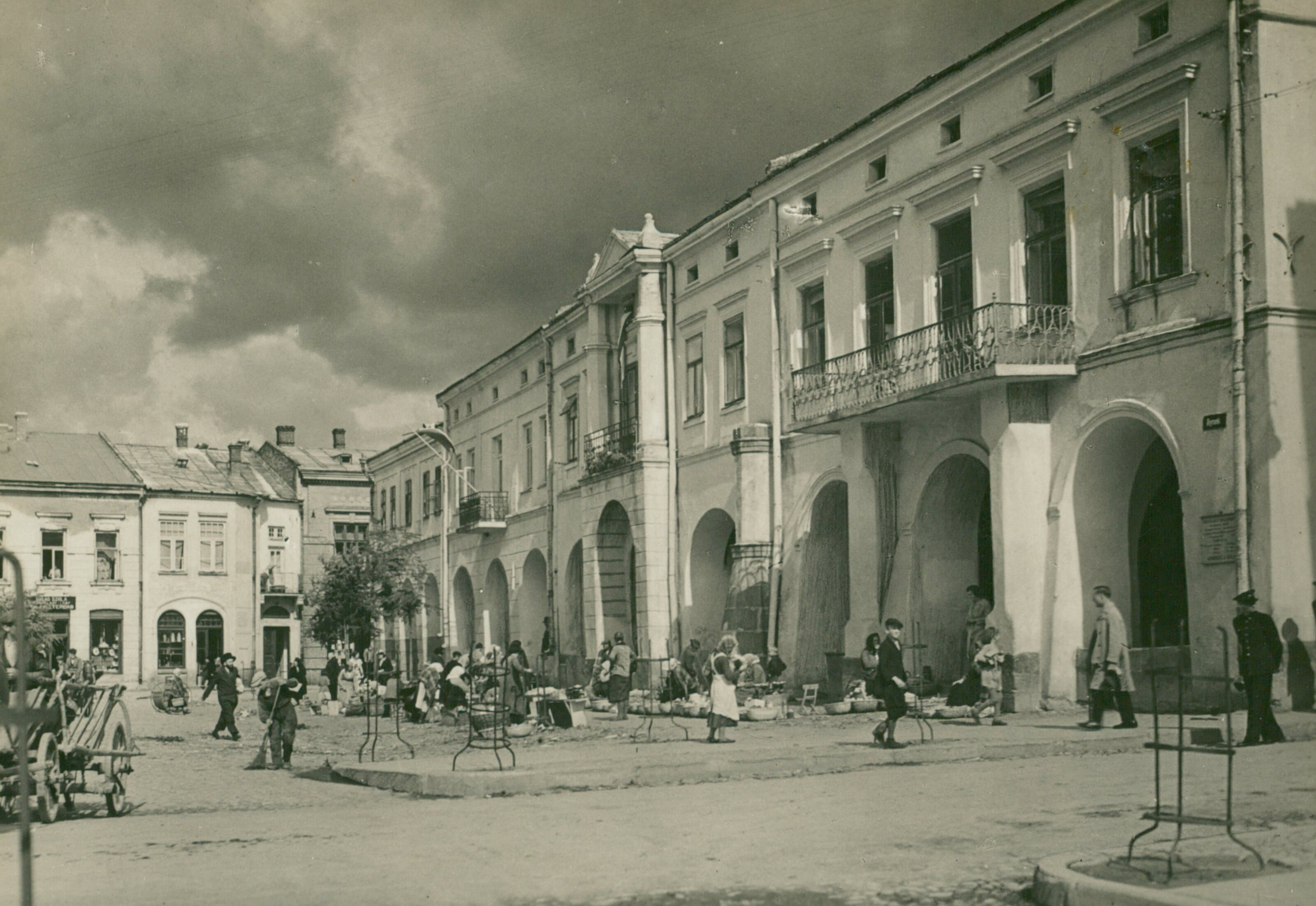
Market square, 1939

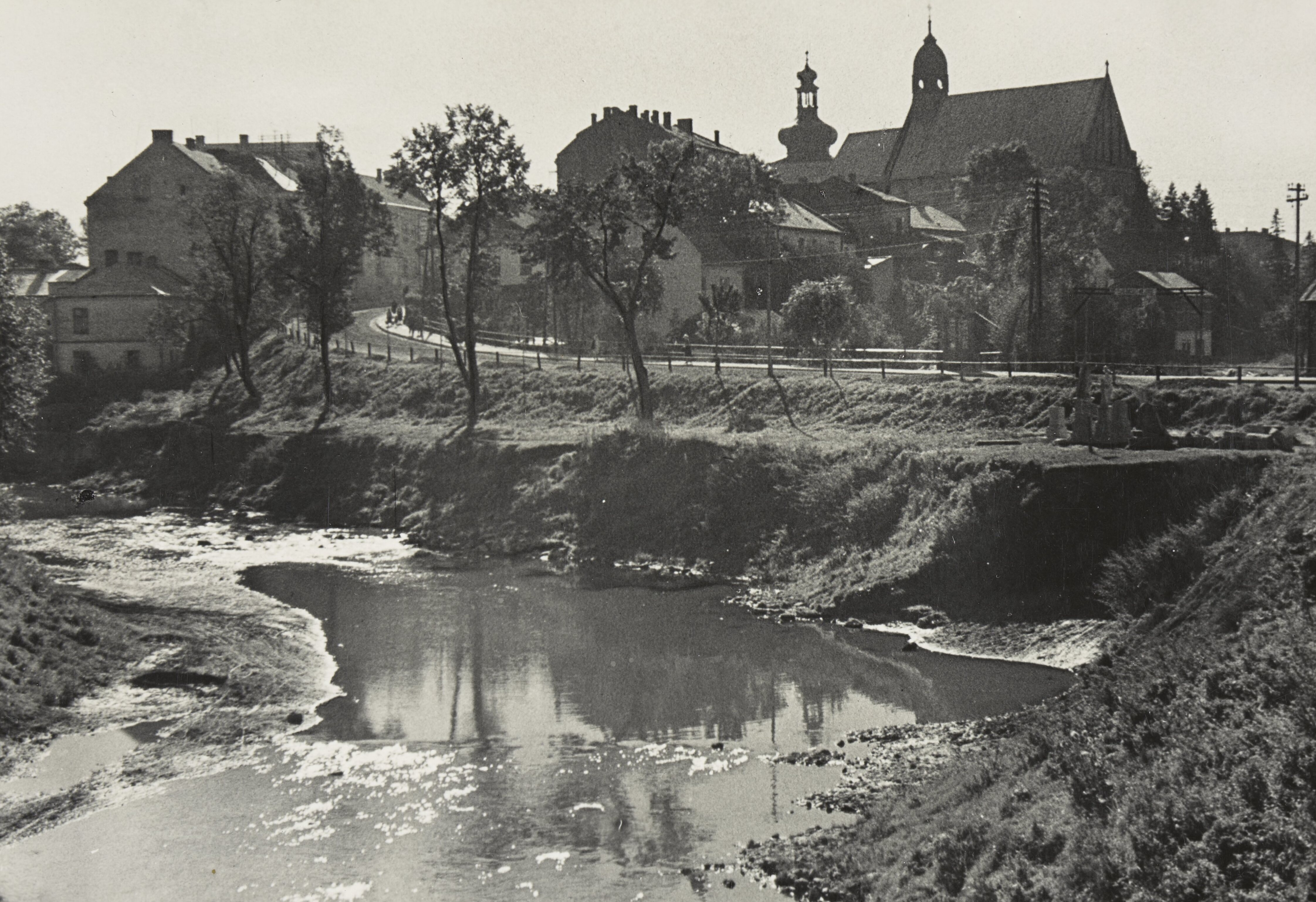
Holy Trinity church, 1939

=== World War II ===
During the German invasion of Poland, which started World War II, on 4 September 1939, the Poles evacuated the local aviation school in three groups to Łuck in then-eastern Poland. After the Soviet invasion of Poland from the east, two groups were captured by the Soviets, while one managed to escape through the Polish-Romanian border.

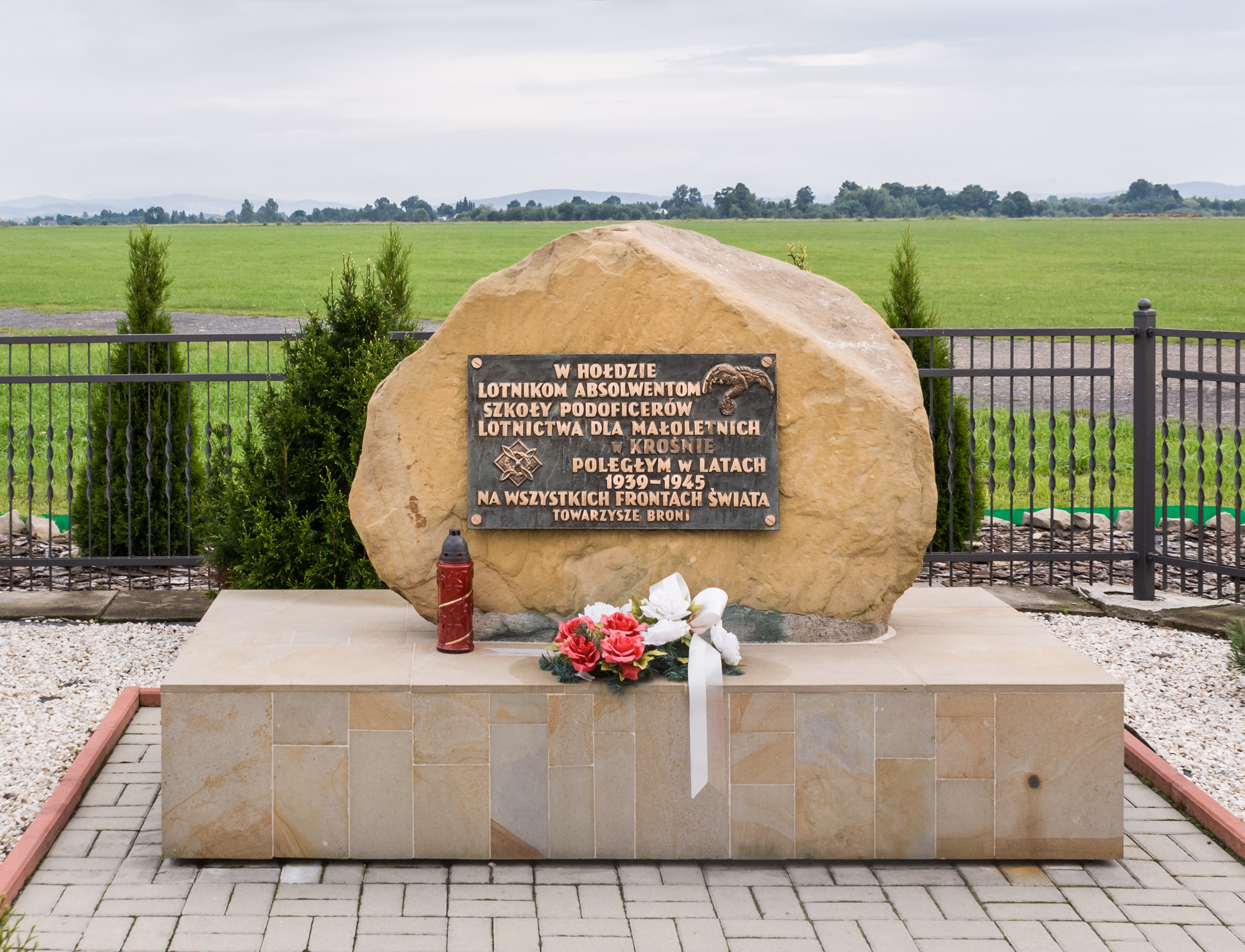
Memorial to students and graduates of the local aviation school killed in World War II

Krosno was under German occupation from 8 September 1939 to 11 September 1944. On 25 September 1939, the German Einsatzgruppe I entered the town to commit various atrocities against the populace. As a result of the genocidal policy of Nazi Germany, which goal was also the biological extermination of Polish children, about 80% of Polish children in the area suffered from anemia. 100 Poles who were either born, lived or studied in Krosno were murdered by the Russians in April–May 1940 in the large Katyn massacre. Among the victims were many local policemen. 24 students of the local aviation school were murdered in Katyn and Kharkiv. From 1942 to 1944, the German Nazi government operated a forced labour camp for Jews in the town.

The war interrupted the prosperous development of Krosno. The machinery and equipment of the glass factory, the refinery and the flax processing plant were stolen or devastated. The Krosno industry was completely ruined.

=== Post-war period ===
In September 1944, almost immediately after liberation, the reconstruction of the industry, destroyed during World War II, began. The glass factory and the flax plant were put into operation. Later on research in geology and oil drilling began, "Polmo" Shock Absorbers Factory and Transport and Aircraft Equipment Factory (WSK) were set up. Oil industry was and still is of importance for the town. Oil Industry Engineering Institute, "Naftomet" Oil Drilling Equipment Factory, Oil Drilling Establishment and "Naftomontaż" enterprise ( assembling oil drilling equipment on oil fields) are organizations which continue the oil industry traditions of the region.

== Geography ==
The River Wisłok passes by Krosno. Slovakia is about 35 kilometres (22 mi) south, and Ukraine is about 85 kilometres (53 mi) east of the town. It is located in the heartland of the Doły (Pits), and its average altitude is 310 metres (1,020 ft) above sea level, but some hills are located within the confines of the town.

Neighbouring municipalities are Korczyna, Krościenko Wyżne, Miejsce Piastowe, Chorkówka, Jedlicze, and Wojaszówka.

Situated in the Subcarpathian Voivodeship (since 1999), previously it was the capital of Krosno Voivodeship (1975–1998). It is the capital of Krosno County.

Krosno covers an area of 45 km^{2} (17 sq mi), and has seven separate town quarters and 5 housing estates. The historical centre is situated on a hill between the fork of the Lubatówka and Wisłok Rivers (tributary of the San River).

== Climate ==
Krosno has an oceanic climate (Köppen climate classification: Cfb) using the −3 °C (27 °F) isotherm or a humid continental climate (Köppen climate classification: Dfb) using the 0 °C (32 °F) isotherm. Krosno has warm summers and cold winters.

Climate data for Krosno (1991–2020 normals, extremes 1951–present)
Month	Jan	Feb	Mar	Apr	May	Jun	Jul	Aug	Sep	Oct	Nov	Dec	Year
Record high °C (°F)	13.5 (56.3)	16.4 (61.5)	23.0 (73.4)	28.1 (82.6)	30.5 (86.9)	33.2 (91.8)	35.5 (95.9)	36.7 (98.1)	34.5 (94.1)	25.5 (77.9)	23.5 (74.3)	14.9 (58.8)	36.7 (98.1)
Mean daily maximum °C (°F)	0.2 (32.4)	2.1 (35.8)	7.3 (45.1)	14.3 (57.7)	19.0 (66.2)	22.2 (72.0)	24.1 (75.4)	24.0 (75.2)	18.6 (65.5)	13.0 (55.4)	7.1 (44.8)	1.4 (34.5)	12.8 (55.0)
Daily mean °C (°F)	−2.2 (28.0)	−0.9 (30.4)	3.1 (37.6)	9.0 (48.2)	13.6 (56.5)	17.0 (62.6)	18.7 (65.7)	18.5 (65.3)	13.7 (56.7)	9.0 (48.2)	4.2 (39.6)	−0.9 (30.4)	8.6 (47.5)
Mean daily minimum °C (°F)	−4.6 (23.7)	−3.6 (25.5)	−0.4 (31.3)	4.2 (39.6)	8.7 (47.7)	12.2 (54.0)	13.8 (56.8)	13.5 (56.3)	9.5 (49.1)	5.8 (42.4)	1.7 (35.1)	−3.1 (26.4)	4.8 (40.6)
Record low °C (°F)	−29.9 (−21.8)	−36.9 (−34.4)	−29.9 (−21.8)	−9.8 (14.4)	−4.2 (24.4)	−2.2 (28.0)	3.0 (37.4)	0.8 (33.4)	−4.7 (23.5)	−8.0 (17.6)	−18.1 (−0.6)	−29.4 (−20.9)	−36.9 (−34.4)
Average precipitation mm (inches)	37.7 (1.48)	38.6 (1.52)	38.3 (1.51)	53.0 (2.09)	95.2 (3.75)	92.5 (3.64)	105.6 (4.16)	75.0 (2.95)	76.6 (3.02)	61.9 (2.44)	43.9 (1.73)	39.6 (1.56)	757.9 (29.84)
Average extreme snow depth cm (inches)	9.7 (3.8)	11.9 (4.7)	6.9 (2.7)	1.8 (0.7)	0.0 (0.0)	0.0 (0.0)	0.0 (0.0)	0.0 (0.0)	0.0 (0.0)	0.7 (0.3)	4.1 (1.6)	6.7 (2.6)	11.9 (4.7)
Average precipitation days (≥ 0.1 mm)	17.17	15.61	14.67	13.73	15.43	14.57	15.73	12.07	12.93	14.33	14.47	17.30	178.01
Average snowy days (≥ 0 cm)	20.6	19.4	8.9	1.1	0.0	0.0	0.0	0.0	0.0	0.5	5.3	17.0	72.8
Average relative humidity (%)	85.7	82.6	75.6	69.5	74.2	75.8	76.0	75.6	80.2	82.2	84.6	86.7	79.1
Mean monthly sunshine hours	62.6	72.1	125.2	181.6	224.6	229.2	246.1	243.1	164.0	120.0	69.1	51.4	1,788
Source 1: Institute of Meteorology and Water Management
Source 2: Meteomodel.pl (records, relative humidity 1991–2020)

== Tourism ==
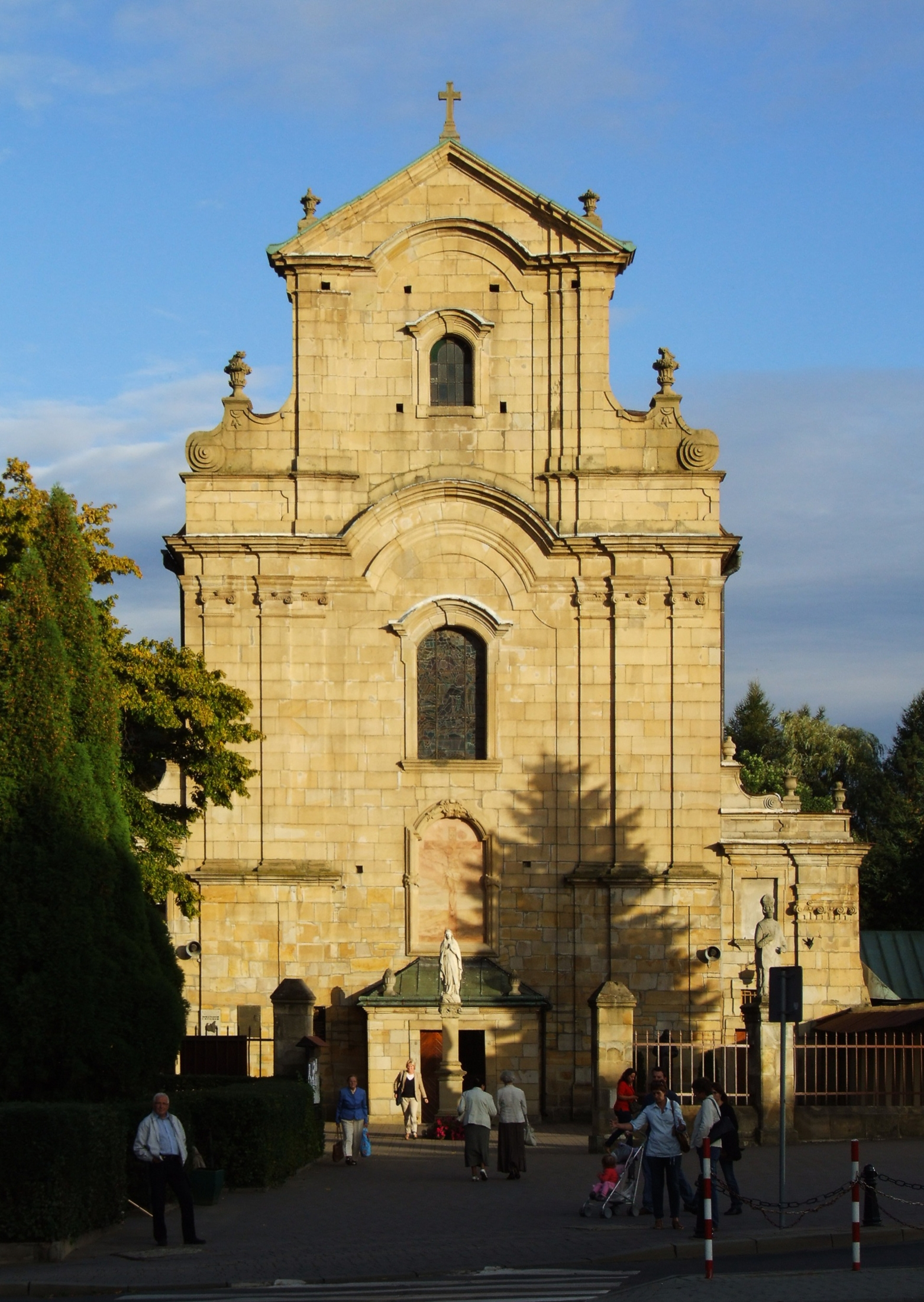
Church of the Capucine Friars

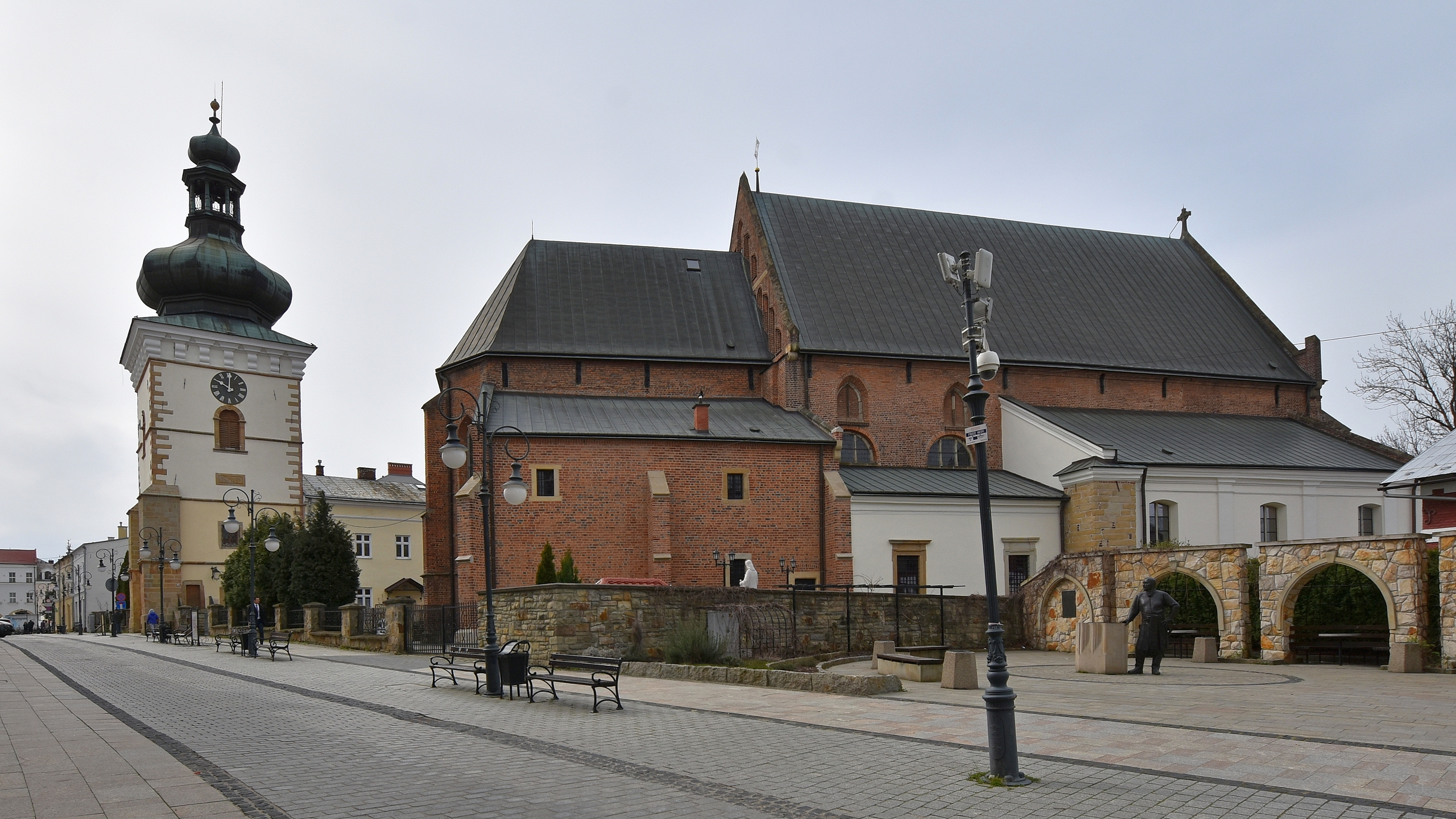
Holy Trinity church and bell tower

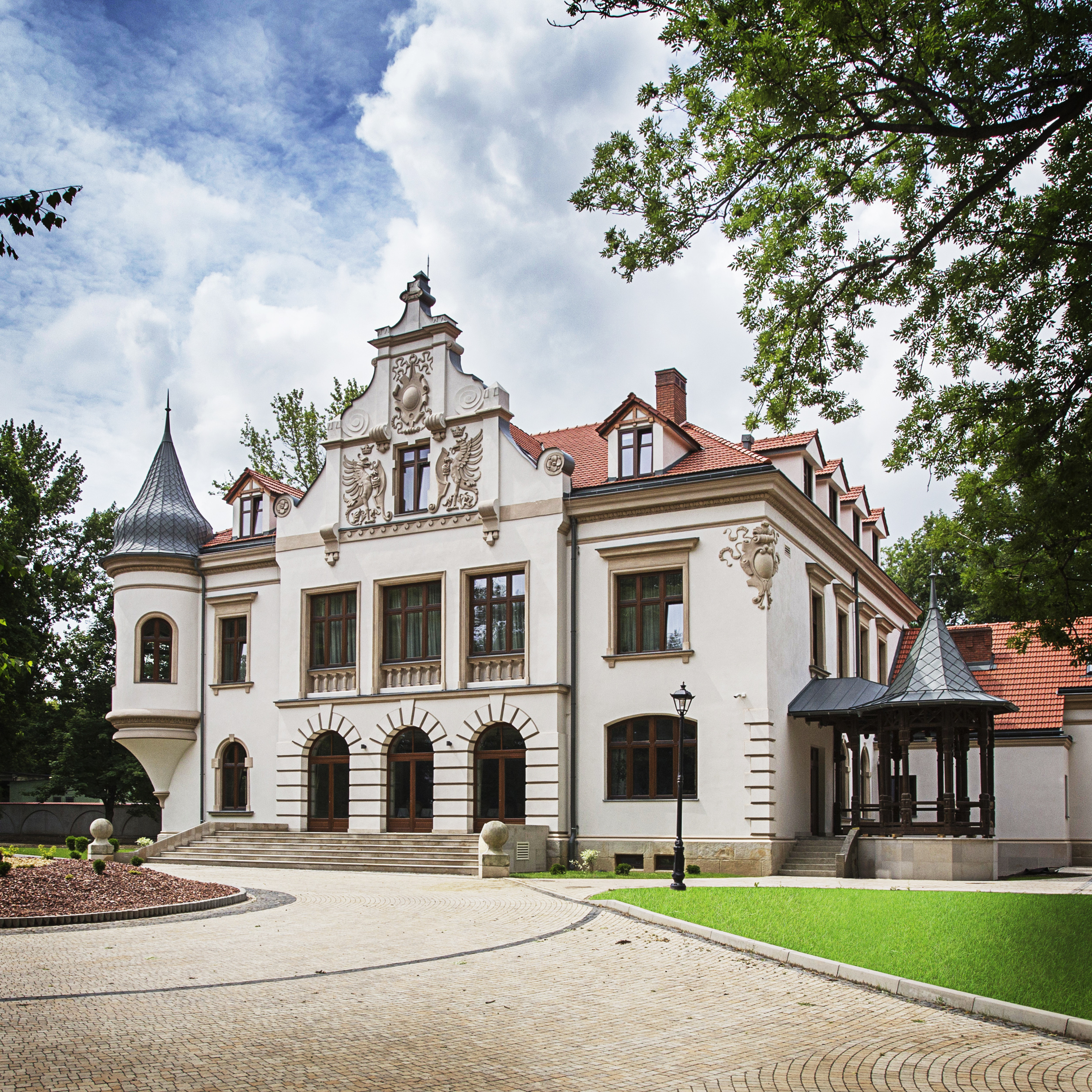
Polanka Palace

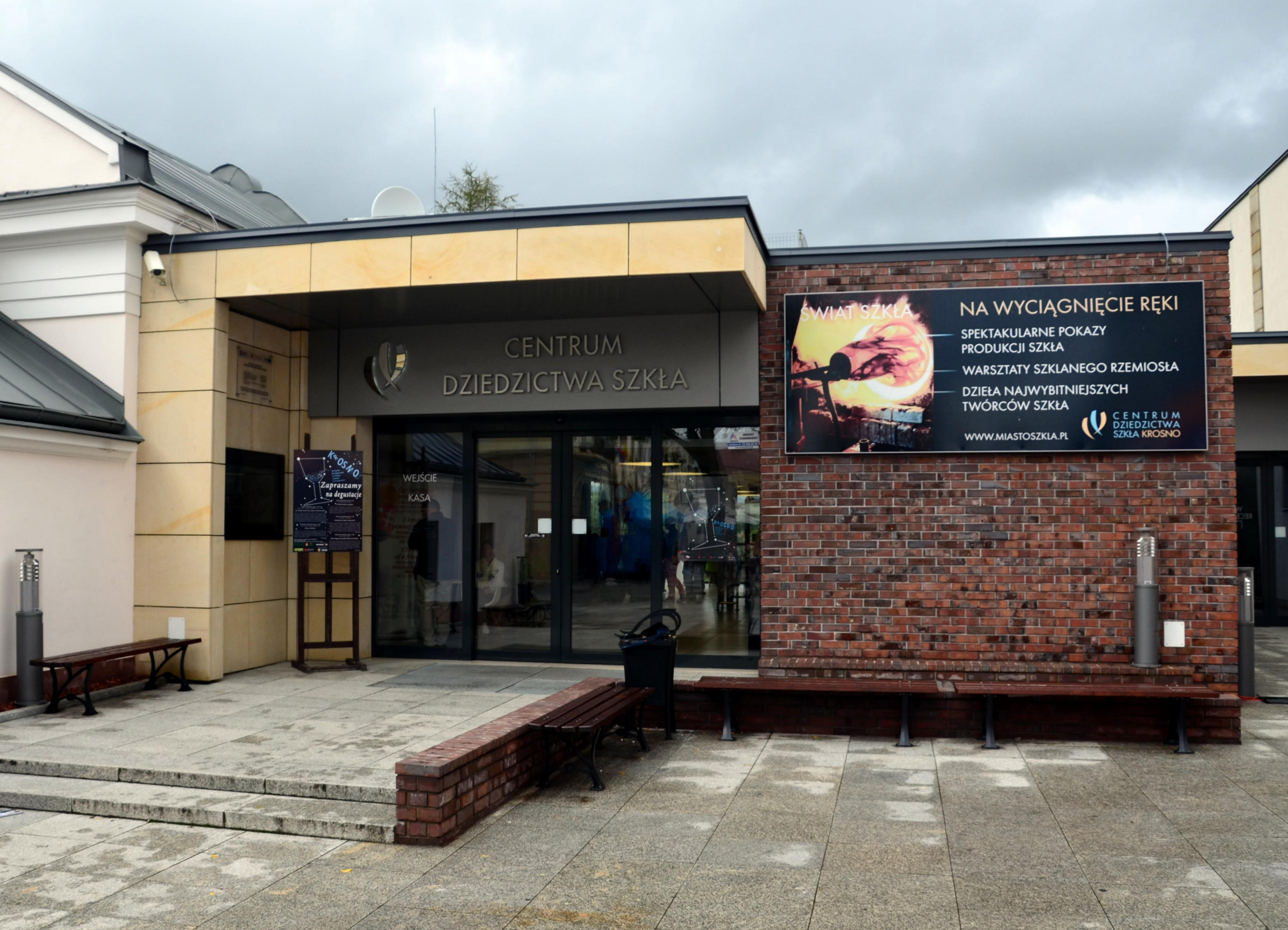
Glass Heritage Centre

Due to a continuously rising number of travelers from Poland and abroad, the town authorities, in 2016, launched a website for tourists (available in English): visitkrosno

Some of Krosno highlights are:

- The Old Town with the Town Square, the Portius Tower and multiple historic townhouses
- Holy Trinity church
- Franciscan church
- Glass Heritage Centre
- Subcarpathian Museum
- The Museum of Crafts

In the nearest neighbourhood:

- the Kamieniec Castle in Odrzykoń
- Assumption of Holy Mary Church, Haczów
- health resort and spa Iwonicz-Zdrój
- Petroleum Industry Museum in Bóbrka, Krosno County
- Maria Konopnicka Museum in Żarnowiec

== Education ==
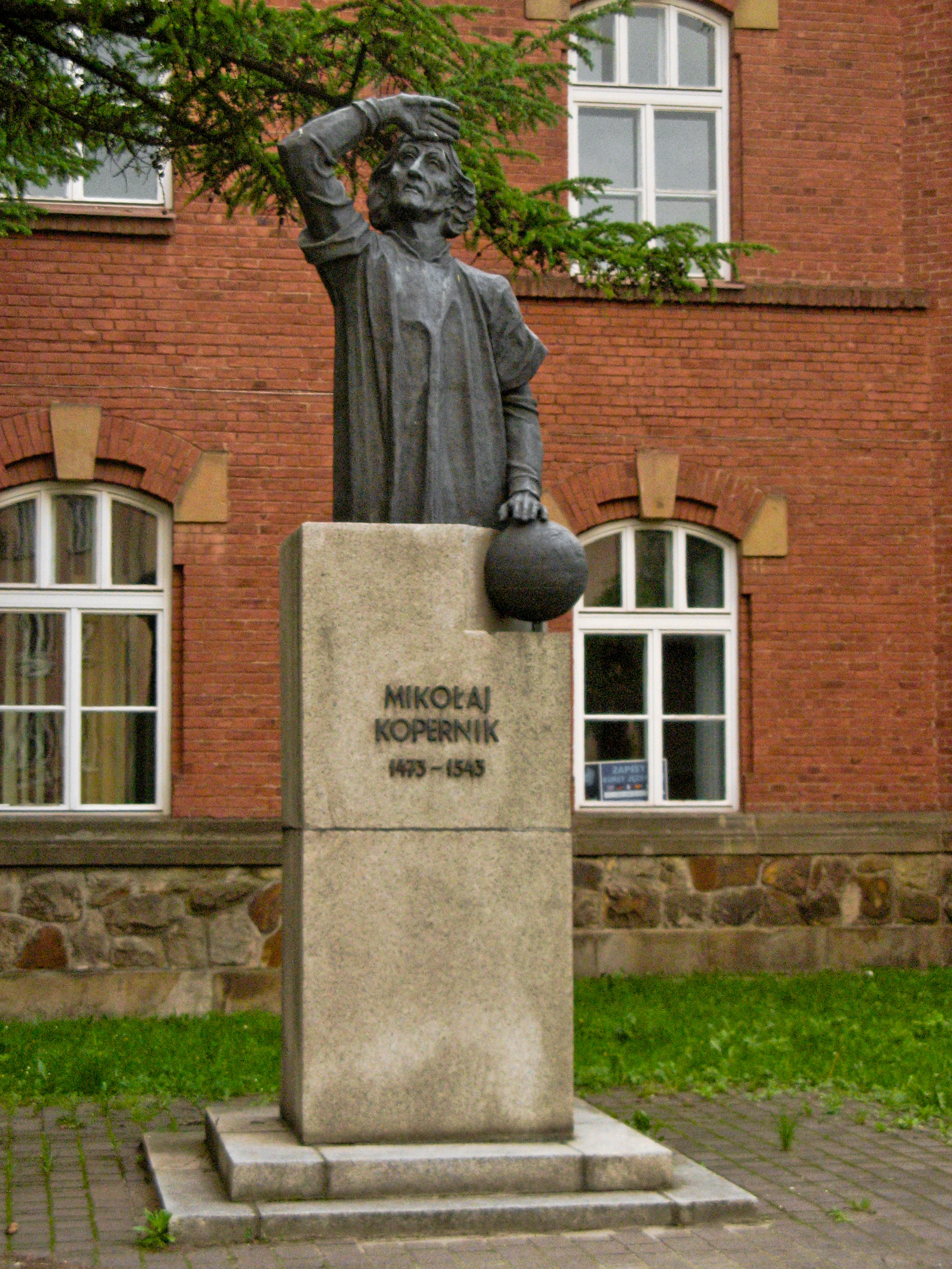
Monument to Nicolaus Copernicus in front of the Nicolaus Copernicus High School

- Państwowa Wyższa Szkoła Zawodowa in Krosno
- Wyzsza Szkoła Informatyki i Zarzadzania in Rzeszów, branch in Krosno
- I Liceum Ogólnokształcące im. Mikołaja Kopernika in Krosno, in 2000 best of the region,

== Politics ==
The Krosno constituency includes several other smaller cities.

== Sport and Culture ==
Several cultural and sporting events on local, national and international scale are held in the town. Culture is celebrated by the Krosno Days of Music, the theatrical Encounters, the Musical Spring, the Krosno Fairs, the Galicia Festival, reviews of children theatres, hiker's songs and poetry singing festivals, the "Kontakt" Euro-Regional Fair, the "Soli Deo Gloria" Euro-Regional Concerts of Christmas Carols. Every two years Krosno hosts the National Biennial of Photography "Krosno - Town and People", International Biennial of Artistic Linen Tapestry "Z Krosna do Krosna", Biennial of Krosno Plastic Arts. Fans of sports throng to international volleyball and basketball tournaments organized annually, the International Mountain Ballooning Contest, the National Tournament of Ballroom Dancing for the Podkarpacie Cup. The band Decapitated hails from Krosno.

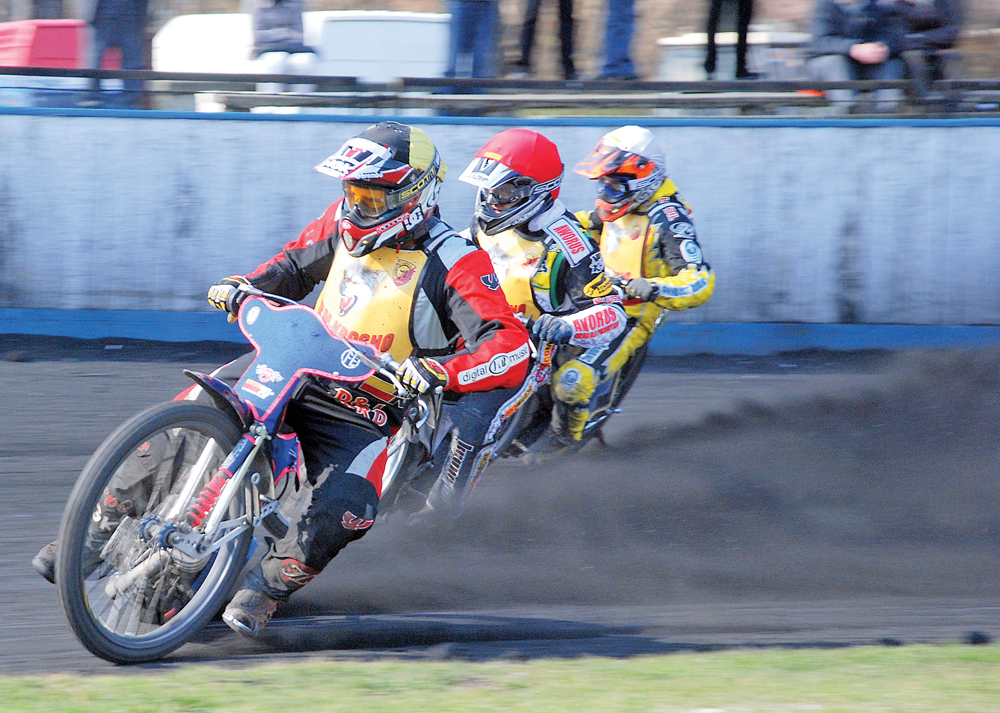
Speedway riders of KSM Krosno

- Karpaty Krosno - a football team.
- Wilki Krosno - speedway team
- UKS Krosno - cycle speedway

== Economy ==
Krosno is located in an oil bearing region. Surface seepage of oil was locally used (unrefined) in lamps as early as the 16th century. In the 19th century Ignacy Łukasiewicz a local pharmacist began exploiting the deposits from hand-dug wells, years before the drilling at Titusville, Pennsylvania which is usually said to be the beginning of modern petroleum development.

One of the things that Krosno is well known for is the quality glassware and crystal that is produced in the town, and distributed throughout the world. The history of the company Krosno Glass S.A. (former Krosno Glassworks) dates back to 1923. The company employs nearly 2,200 people and is the largest employer in the region. A long tradition in glass production and the influence of the glass industry on the local economy have made Krosno known as the "Glass City".

== Notable people ==
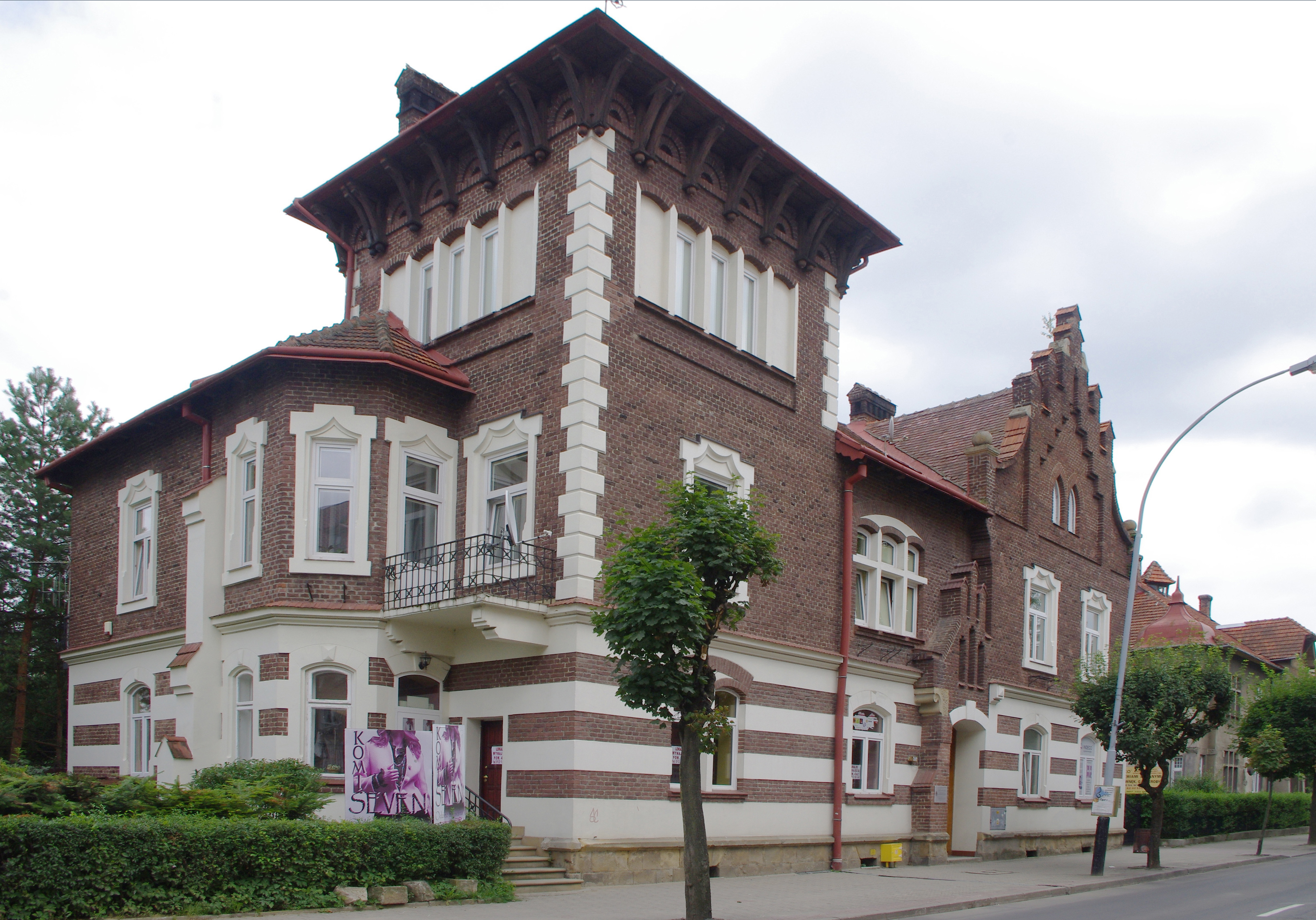
Former home of painter Stanisław Bergman

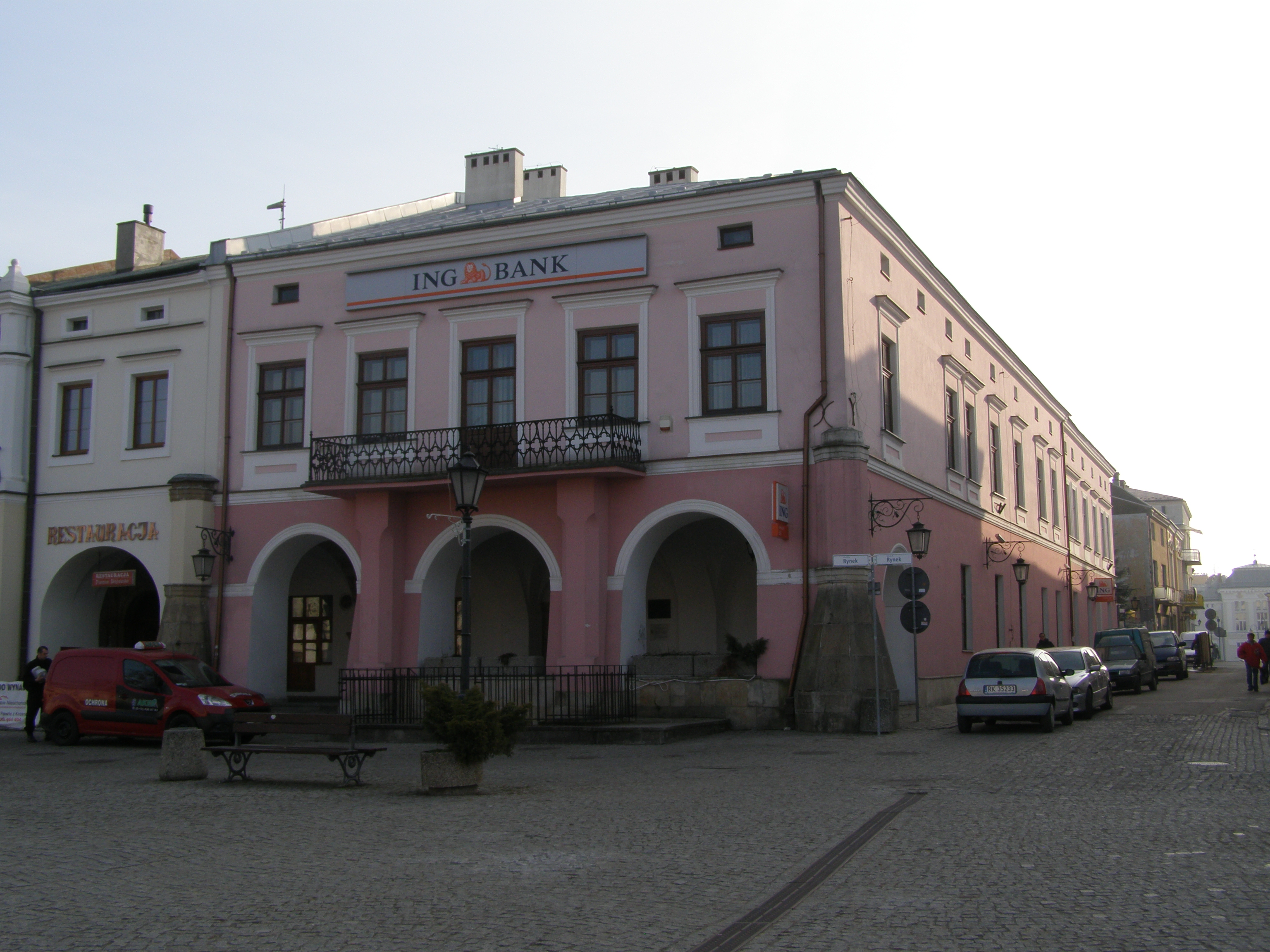
Former home of poet Franciszek Mirandola

- Stanisław Bergman (1862–1930), Polish painter
- Seweryn Bieszczad (1852–1923), Polish painter
- Kacper Bieszczad (born 2002), footballer
- Decapitated, Polish Death Metal band established in 1996
- Władysław Gomułka (1905–1982), communist leader of Poland
- Fabius Gross (1906–1950), Austrian marine zoologist
- Magdalena Jurczyk (born 1995), volleyball player
- Antoni Kozubal (born 2004), footballer
- Andrzej Pikul (born 1954), Polish pianist
- Paweł Przytocki (born 1958), Polish conductor of classical music
- Kamil Radulj (born 1988), football player
- Jerzy Werner (1909–1977), Polish car designer
- Karolina Zmarlak (born 1982), Polish-American fashion designer

== International relations ==
=== Twin towns — Sister cities ===
Krosno is twinned with:

Edewecht, Germany, since 1996; Sátoraljaújhely, Hungary, since 2006; Zalaegerszeg, Hungary, since 2000; Uzhhorod in Ukraine, since 2008	Sárospatak in Hungary, since 2007; Uherské Hradiště, Czech Republic, since 2009; Košice, Slovakia, since 2009

== Gallery ==
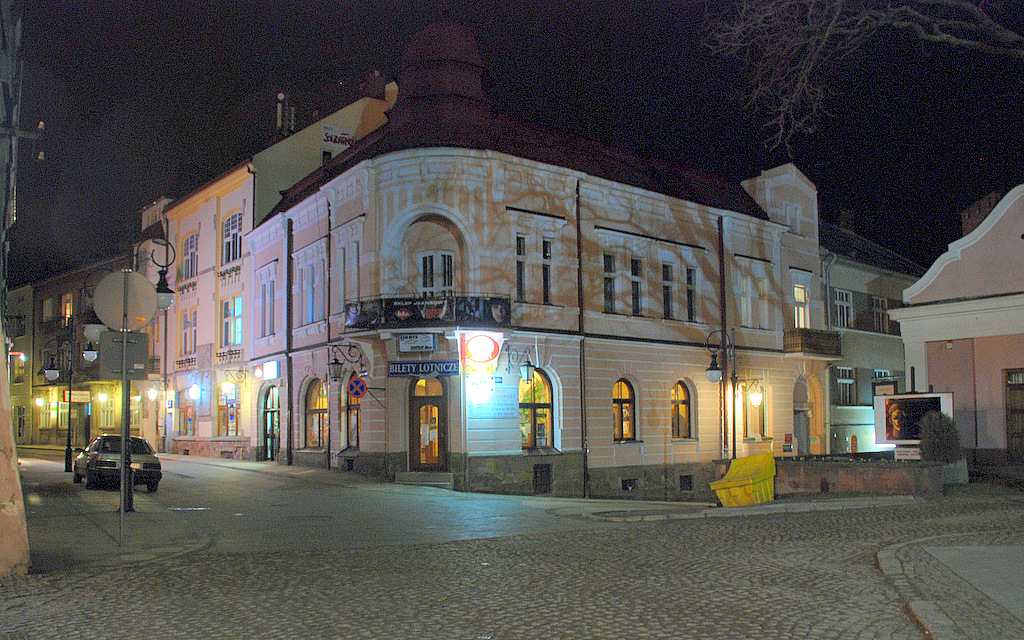
Orbis Travel agency

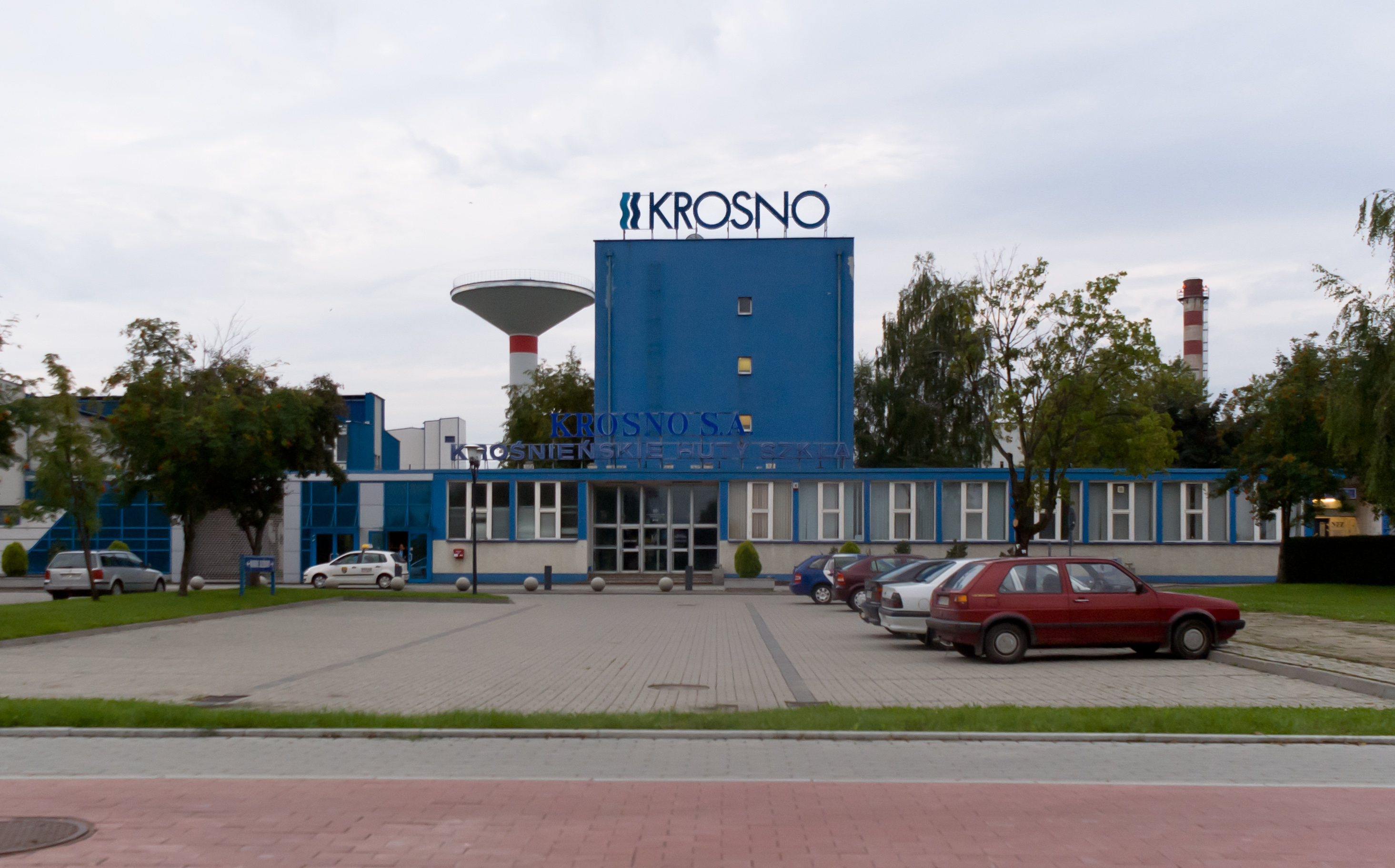
Krosno Glassworks

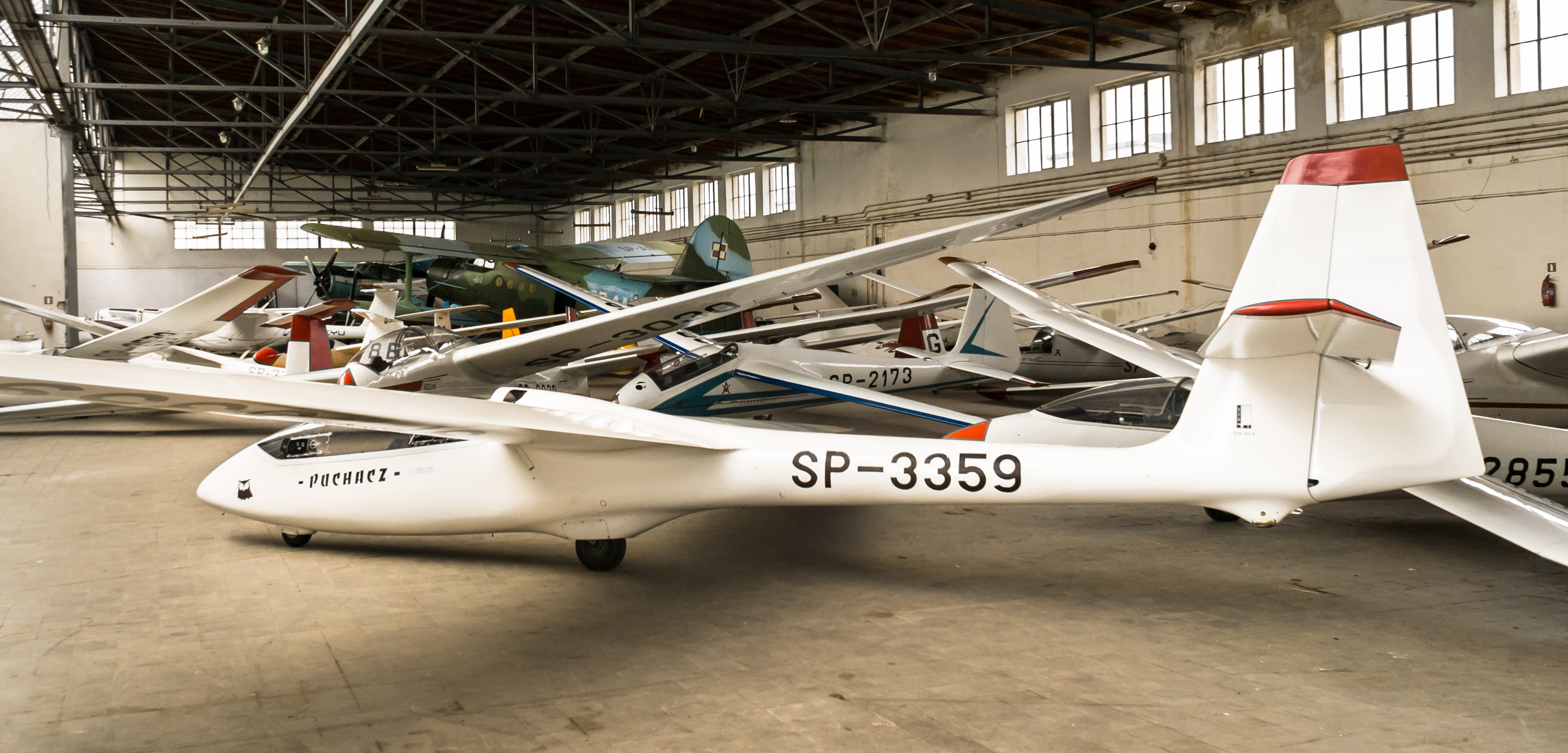
Polish glider SZD-50-3 at the airport in Krosno

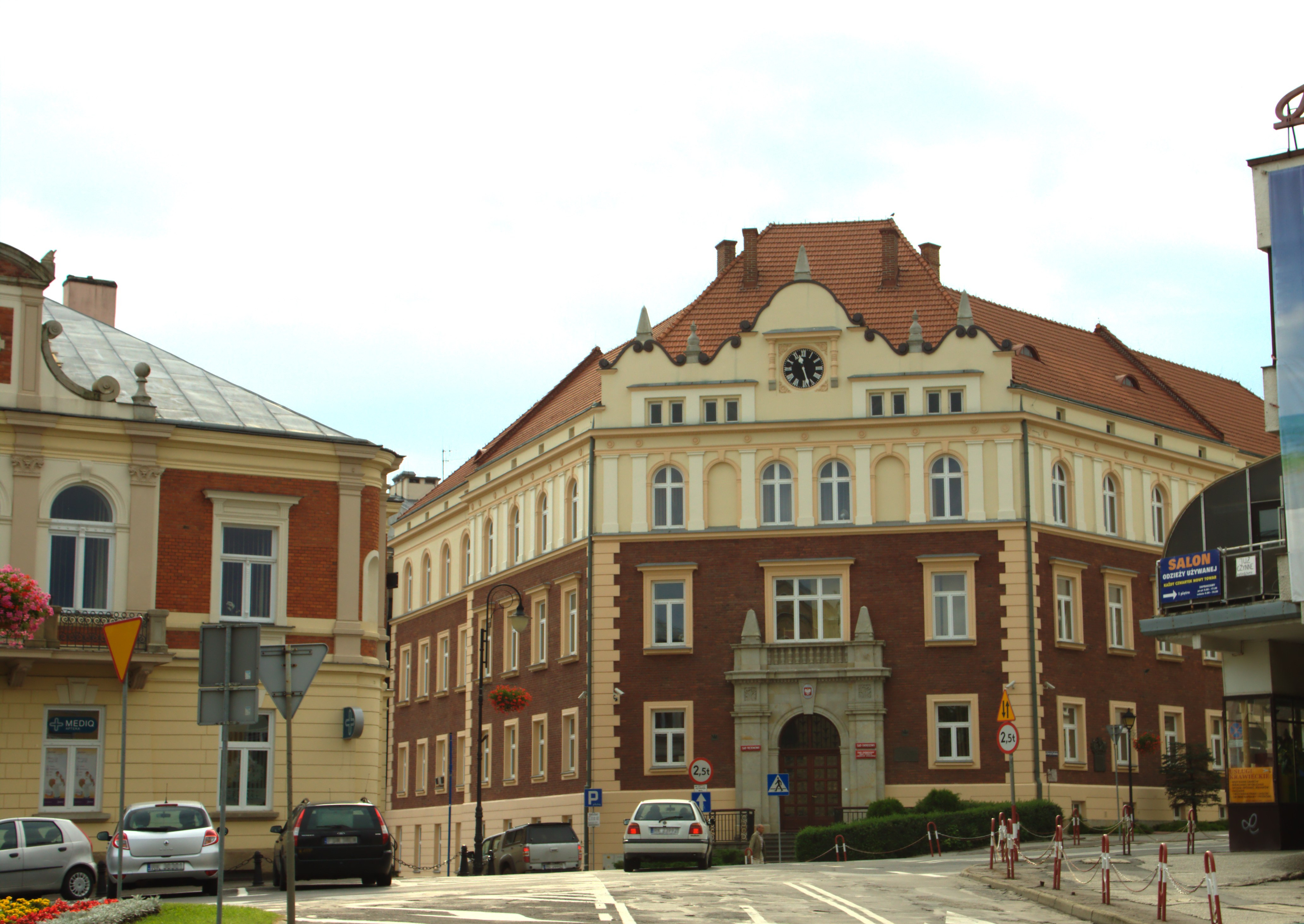
District court

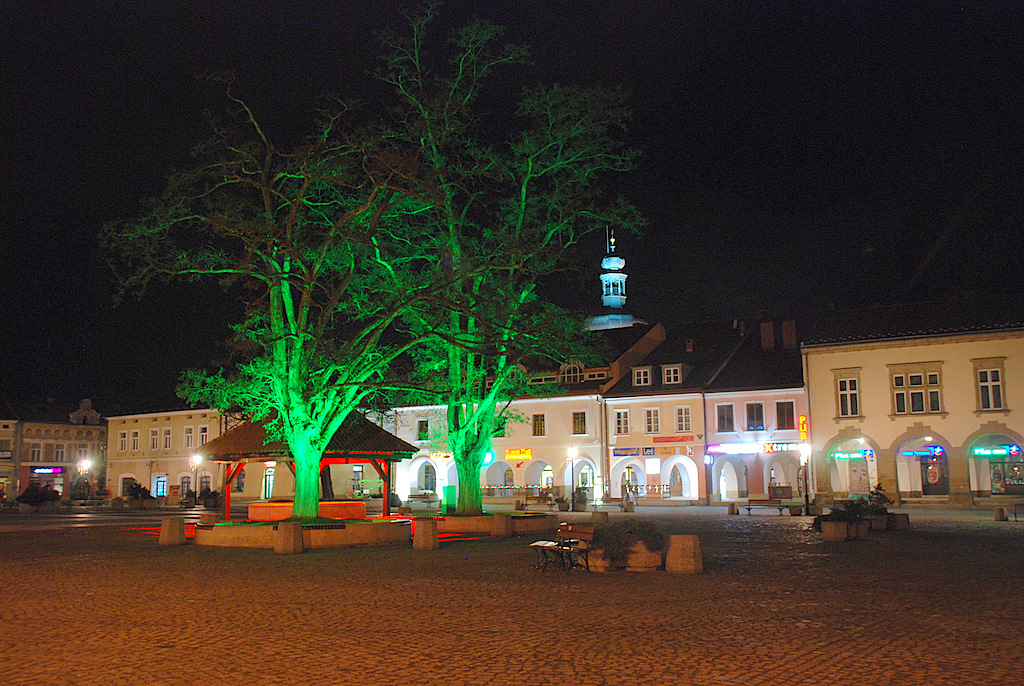
Krosno Square at night

== See also ==
- Oświęcim Chapel
