= Oliver McCall vs. Frank Bruno =

Boxing match

The Empire Strikes Back
- Date: 2 September 1995
- Venue: Wembley Stadium, London, England
- Title(s) on the line: WBC Heavyweight Championship

Tale of the tape
Boxer	Oliver McCall	Frank Bruno
Nickname	The Atomic Bull	
Hometown	Chicago, Illinois, U.S.	London, England
Pre-fight record	26–5 (18 KO)	39–4 (38 KO)
Age	30 years, 4 months	33 years, 9 months
Height	6 ft 2 in (188 cm)	6 ft 3 in (191 cm)
Weight	234 3/4 lb (106 kg)	247 3/4 lb (112 kg)
Style	Orthodox	Orthodox
Recognition	WBC; Heavyweight Champion; The Ring; No. 2 Ranked Heavyweight	WBC; No. 6 Ranked Heavyweight

Result
- Bruno wins via unanimous decision (117–111, 117–111, 115–113)

Oliver McCall vs. Frank Bruno, billed as The Empire Strikes Back, was a professional boxing match contested on 2 September 1995 for the WBC Heavyweight Championship.

== Background ==
McCall first wrested the WBC championship by knocking out Lennox Lewis on 24 September 1994 in London. Since then he had made one defence of his title, a hotly contested and closely fought decision against former world heavyweight champion Larry Holmes on 8 April 1995.

This was Bruno's fourth attempt at winning a world title. WBA Champion Tim Witherspoon knocked him out in 11 rounds in 1986, undisputed champion Mike Tyson stopped him in five rounds in 1989, and WBC champion Lennox Lewis finished his fellow Brit in seven rounds in 1993.

The winner of the bout was contractually obligated to defend his belt against the returning Tyson in his next fight.

== The fight ==
In the opening rounds, Bruno unloaded a barrage of left jabs and a right hand that knocked McCall onto the ropes and left him stunned. However, McCall absorbed the punishment, put up little defense and waited until the fifth round to throw a meaningful punch. But by then, Bruno was boxing well and ahead on points.

As the fight wore on, it became apparent that McCall's hope was to retain the title by winning by stoppage or knockout in the hope Bruno would tire.

McCall hurt Bruno with an uppercut in the 11th, and in the 12th, McCall shoved the local hero around the ring and unloaded a hard right to Bruno's head. McCall banged Bruno with another body shot and a left-right combination. Bruno, bleeding from the mouth, hanging on and desperately tired, used his ring experience to survive the onslaught.

Judge Malcolm Bulner gave Bruno a 115-113 victory. Newton Campos and Fay Solis each had Bruno the winner by 117-111. Bruno became only the third British-born boxer to win a world heavyweight title along with Bob Fitzsimmons and Lennox Lewis—and he was the first to win it on British soil.

== Aftermath ==
Bruno's reign as champion was short lived as he lost his first defence against Mike Tyson and retired shortly afterwards.

McCall returned to the ring 6 months later when he beat future WBC heavyweight champion Oleg Maskaev. In 1997 he fought a rematch again Lennox Lewis for the now vacant WBC title, which he lost in bizarre fashion as he refused to fight and started crying.

== Undercard ==
Confirmed bouts:

Winner	Loser	Weight division/title belt(s) disputed	Result
(United Kingdom) Nigel Benn	(United States) Daniel Perez	WBC World super middleweight title	7th-round KO.
(United States) Virgil Hill	(Malawi) Drake Thadzi	WBA World light heavyweight title	Unanimous Decision.
Non-TV bouts
(Albania) Bahre Ahmeti	(United Kingdom) Steve Foster	vacant IBF Inter-Continental super welterweight title	4th-round TKO
(United Kingdom) Paul Ryan	(United Kingdom) Karl Taylor	Welterweight (8 rounds)	3rd-round TKO

== Broadcasting ==
Country	Broadcaster
Mexico	TV Azteca
United Kingdom	Sky Sports
United States	Showtime

Preceded by vs. Larry Holmes	Oliver McCall's bouts 2 September 1995	Succeeded by vs. Oleg Maskaev
Preceded by vs. Mike Evans	Frank Bruno's bouts 2 September 1995	Succeeded by vs. Mike Tyson II
