= Lennox Lewis vs. Oliver McCall =

Boxing match

Whose Moment of Glory
- Date: 24 September 1994
- Venue: Wembley Arena, London, England
- Title(s) on the line: WBC Heavyweight Championship

Tale of the tape
Boxer	Lennox Lewis	Oliver McCall
Nickname	The Lion	The Atomic Bull
Hometown	London, England	Chicago, Illinois, U.S.
Purse	$3,500,000	$1,000,000
Pre-fight record	25–0 (21 KO)	24–5 (17 KO)
Age	29 years	29 years, 5 months
Height	6 ft 5 in (196 cm)	6 ft 2 in (188 cm)
Weight	238 lb (108 kg)	238 lb (108 kg)
Style	Orthodox	Orthodox
Recognition	WBC; Heavyweight Champion; The Ring; No. 2 Ranked Heavyweight	WBA/WBC/IBF; No 1 Ranked Heavyweight; The Ring; No. 4 Ranked Heavyweight

Result
- McCall wins via second-round technical knockout

Lennox Lewis vs. Oliver McCall, billed Whose Moment of Glory, was a professional boxing match contested on 24 September 1994 for the WBC Heavyweight Championship.

== Background ==
After three successful, but less-than-impressive defenses of his WBC title, Lennox Lewis' next opponent became Oliver McCall. Coming into his fight with Lewis, McCall sported an unimpressive 24–5 record with a majority of his wins being against unknown journeymen while his five losses had come against heavyweight contenders including Orlin Norris, James "Buster" Douglas and Tony Tucker. However, after joining promoter Don King's stable and embarking on a modest five fight win streak, McCall was named the WBC's number one contender and thus became the mandatory challenger for Lewis' title. Lewis paid little attention to McCall, and prior to the fight, entered into negotiations with both the WBA and IBF Michael Moorer and Olympic rival Riddick Bowe to determine who he would face after his planned defeat of McCall. On June 17, it was announced that both Lewis and Bowe's managers had come to an agreement for the long-awaited Lewis–Bowe championship fight. The two fighters were scheduled to split a then-record $31 million purse, but Lewis would still have to get past McCall for the bout to happen.

== The fight ==
The two men fought a close first round, with neither fighter generating much offense in the round. Lewis attempted to lead with his jab but was unable to connect much with it, meanwhile McCall seemingly was waiting for Lewis to make a mistake that would give him the opportunity to land some power punches. At the end of the round, two judges scored the round 10–9 for Lewis while the third had the fight tied at 10–10. Lewis was aggressive to start the second round, but as he tried to throw a right hand, McCall quickly countered with a right hand of his own that dropped Lewis to the canvas. Lewis got up at the count of six, but was on wobbly knees. Referee Jose Guadalupe Garcia continued to count to nine before waving the fight off when Lewis fell into him. McCall was declared the new WBC Heavyweight Champion by way of technical knockout. There were complaints of an early stoppage by the Lewis camp, but Boxing Monthly editor Glynn Leach pointed out that Lewis "only seemed to recover his senses once the fight was waved off," and that "in the opinions of everyone I spoke to at ringside, the decision was correct."

== Aftermath ==
As a result of his loss, Lewis' planned superfight with Bowe was cancelled. Lewis, however, attempted to gain a rematch with McCall and offered him $10 million to accept it. McCall refused the offer claiming that he was disrespected by Lewis' post-fight comments of being "robbed" of the title. Lewis' promoter Dan Duva responded to McCall's refusal by stating that "That just shows to me they want to baby-sit the title until Tyson gets out", referring to former heavyweight champion Mike Tyson's release from prison expected sometime in 1995.

McCall instead took a fight against Larry Holmes in April 1995, with the aging former champion seeking to join 46-year-old George Foreman as a reigning champion in his forties. After barely beating Holmes in a close decision, McCall lost his title to veteran British heavyweight Frank Bruno in London. Meanwhile, Lewis and Bowe came to terms on a contract for a fight in the fall of 1996, but after Bowe's poor performance in a tuneup against Andrew Golota the fight was cancelled and Lewis began trying to regain his title.

Meanwhile, Bruno was knocked out by Tyson in a mandatory defense immediately after winning the title and Lewis was installed as the top contender. Tyson instead paid Lewis $4 million so he could face WBA champion Bruce Seldon in what was supposed to be a unification fight, but the WBC refused to allow Tyson to defend his title against Seldon and he vacated the belt instead. This set up a rematch with McCall, who was the #2 contender, for the vacant title. In one of the most bizarre fights in boxing history, McCall refused to fight in the fourth and fifth round and began crying, causing the referee to stop the fight and award Lewis the victory by technical knockout. Lewis would successfully defend his WBC title nine times and add both the WBA and IBF world titles before Hasim Rahman upset him with a knockout in April 2001. After avenging the defeat later that year by returning the favor, Lewis fought only twice more. He defeated Tyson in June 2002 by knockout for the WBC and IBF titles, then took on Vitali Klitschko in June 2003. An out-of-shape Lewis opened a deep cut over the challenger's eye early in the fight, which eventually resulted in the fight's stoppage after six rounds in a fight Lewis was losing on all three scorecards. He retired shortly thereafter.

== Undercard ==
Confirmed bouts:

== Broadcasting ==
Country	Broadcaster
United Kingdom	Wire TV (Live) / BBC (Delayed)
United States	HBO

Preceded by vs. Phil Jackson	Lennox Lewis's bouts 24 September 1994	Succeeded by vs. Lionel Butler
Preceded by vs. Dan Murphy	Oliver McCall's bouts 24 September 1994	Succeeded by vs. Larry Holmes
