= Oliver McCall vs. Larry Holmes =

Boxing competition, April 1995

Burden of Proof
- Date: April 8, 1995
- Venue: Caesars Palace, Paradise, Nevada, U.S.
- Title(s) on the line: WBC Heavyweight Championship

Tale of the tape
Boxer	Oliver McCall	Larry Holmes
Nickname	The Atomic Bull	The Easton Assassin
Hometown	Chicago, Illinois, U.S.	Easton, Pennsylvania, U.S.
Purse	$1,500,000	$350,000
Pre-fight record	25–5 (18 KO)	64–4 (40 KO)
Age	29 years, 11 months	45 years, 5 months
Height	6 ft 2 in (188 cm)	6 ft 3 in (191 cm)
Weight	231 lb (105 kg)	236 lb (107 kg)
Style	Orthodox	Orthodox
Recognition	WBC; Heavyweight Champion; The Ring; No. 2 Ranked Heavyweight	WBC; No. 8 Ranked Heavyweight; The Ring; No. 6 Ranked Heavyweight

Result
- McCall wins via 12-round unanimous decision (115-112, 115-114, 114-113)

Oliver McCall vs. Larry Holmes, billed as "Burden of Proof", was a professional boxing match contested on April 8, 1995 for the WBC Heavyweight Championship. The undercard included world championship bouts in four other categories.

== Background ==
After Oliver McCall stunned Lennox Lewis in the second round to become WBC Heavyweight Champion, he turned down a $10 million offer from Lewis for an immediate rematch. Instead he agreed to fight 45 year old former WBC, IBF and lineal heavyweight champion Larry Holmes, who was making his fourth attempt at regaining a heavyweight title after losing to Michael Spinks in 1985. Each of his previous three attempts (against Spinks in 1986 in a rematch, against Mike Tyson in 1988, and against Evander Holyfield in 1992) ended in defeat, although he went the distance in two of the three fights.

== The fights ==
In addition to the main event title fight, four other world championship bouts were contested that evening.

=== Undercard ===
There were wins Carl Daniels, Frans Botha, Henry Akinwande, Tim Austin and Nana Konadu on the undercard.

=== Tucker vs Seldon ===
Burden of Proof:Tony Tucker vs. Bruce Seldon
- Title(s) on the line: WBA Heavyweight Championship

Tale of the tape
Boxer	Tony Tucker	Bruce Seldon
Nickname	TNT	The Atlantic City Express
Hometown	Grand Rapids, Michigan	Atlantic City, New Jersey
Purse	$250,000	$250,000
Pre-fight record	52–2 (1) (43 KO)	31–3 (27 KO)
Age	36 years, 3 months	28 years, 2 months
Height	6 ft 5 in (196 cm)	6 ft 1 1/2 in (187 cm)
Weight	243 lb (110 kg)	236 lb (107 kg)
Style	Orthodox	Orthodox
Recognition	WBA/WBC/IBF; No. 1 Ranked Heavyweight	WBA/IBF; No. 2 Ranked Heavyweight; WBC; No. 4 Ranked Heavyweight

Result
- Seldon defeated Tucker by 7th round corner retirement

The first bout of the televised portion of the card was between Bruce Seldon and former IBF champion Tony Tucker for the WBA heavyweight title that had been stripped from George Foreman after he refused to fight top contender Tucker.

==== The fight ====
Seldon used his left jab to control the action, landing frequently on Tucker's head. After round 7 the ringside physician Flip Homansky examined Tucker's badly swollen left eye and told referee Mills Lane that Tucker could not continue.

At the time of the stoppage Seldon led all three scorecards 67-66, 67-66 and 68-65

==== Aftermath ====
Ringside physician Flip Homansky explained his decision saying "I was checking the fight for three rounds and I was concerned about the orbital rim and nasal fractures, I was more concerned (Tucker's) eye than the title shot. Tucker was gradually losing vision out of the left eye. It was going to close totally. And that is just how I had to handle it."

Tucker was unhappy with the stoppage saying "I was winning the fight clearly, I was ahead on all the scorecards. They'd better give me a rematch. It was wrong for them to stop the fight."

Seldon meanwhile would say "If I have to beat him up again, I'll beat him up again, it's all right with me."

It was later determined that Tucker's eye socket was fractured.

Preceded by vs. Dan Murphy	Tony Tucker's bouts 8 April 1995	Succeeded by vs. Henry Akinwande
Preceded by vs. Bill Corrigan	Bruce Seldon's bouts 8 April 1995	Succeeded by vs. Joe Hipp

=== Trinidad vs Turner ===
In the next fight, IBF welterweight champion Félix Trinidad made the sixth defence of his championship he had held since 1993 against Roger Turner.

==== The fight ====
Trinidad made quick work of Turner, knocking him out in the second round to run his record to 26-0.

Preceded by vs. Oba Carr	Félix Trinidad's bouts 8 April 1995	Succeeded by vs. Larry Barnes
Preceded by vs. Jack McGlathin	Roger Turner's bouts 8 April 1995	Succeeded by vs. Adrian Stone

=== Chávez vs Parisi ===
Julio César Chávez faced Giovanni Parisi in the third defence of his WBC and lineal junior welterweight championships that he had won back from Frankie Randall in June 1994 to avenge what was, to that point in his career, his only defeat.

==== The fight ====
Chavez won a lopsided unanimous decision to win his 93rd career fight.

Preceded by vs. Tony Lopez	Julio César Chávez's bouts 8 April 1995	Succeeded by vs. Craig Houk
Preceded by vs. Freddie Pendleton	Giovanni Parisi's bouts 8 April 1995	Succeeded by vs. Angel Fernandez

=== Santana vs Norris II ===
The final match before the main event was a rematch for the WBC super welterweight crown, in which former champion Terry Norris looked to regain the championship he lost to Luis Santana under controversial circumstances in November 1994.

Norris was a 13-1 favorite.

==== The fight ====
Norris started well knocking Santana down once in round two and once in round three.

However, as he had been in the first fight, Norris was disqualified. This time, he hit Santana after the bell to end the third round and referee Kenny Bayless awarded the fight to Santana.

Preceded by First Bout	Luis Santana's bouts 8 April 1995	Succeeded by Second Rematch
Preceded by First Bout	Terry Norris's bouts 8 April 1995	Succeeded by Second Rematch

=== Main Event ===
For most of the 12 rounds Holmes was often hanging on the ropes, allowing McCall to open a flurry, before countering with quick rights. McCall tried to jab with Holmes throwing right leads and connecting with McCall's chin.

In the ninth round a McCall left backed Holmes backward into the ropes, which were the only thing that kept him from falling. From then on, McCall dominated the fight. There were no knockdowns, but McCall gave Holmes a severe gash on his left cheekbone.

Judge Barbara Perez scored the fight 114–113, judge Tomi Tomihari had it 115–114 and judge Chuck Giampa called it 115–112, all three to McCall.

== Aftermath ==
Oliver McCall's next bout was against British veteran Frank Bruno, who defeated him later in 1995 to win the title. Bruno in turn would immediately lose the title in his first defence against Mike Tyson, whom the winner of the fight was contractually obligated to face.

Bruce Seldon would make one successful defence of his WBA title, defeating Joe Hipp by TKO in the tenth round on the undercard of Tyson's comeback fight event. In his next fight after that, he defended the title against Tyson, who knocked him out in the first round.

Félix Trinidad would hold onto the IBF welterweight championship until 1999, making a total of fourteen successful defences. After winning the WBC and lineal championships from Oscar De La Hoya that year, he moved up in weight and by 2001 had also won titles at junior middleweight and middleweight.

Julio César Chávez would make one more sanctioned defence of his WBC and lineal super lightweight titles before losing them to De La Hoya by knockout in June 1996, the first time in his career he had been stopped. He continued fighting until 2005, finishing with a career record of 107 wins, 6 losses, and 2 draws.

Terry Norris and Luis Santana fought for a third time on the Tyson comeback undercard, and this time there was a definitive winner as Norris knocked Santana out in the second round to regain the WBC super welterweight title. Norris then added the IBF championship and the lineal championship to his resume by beating Paul Vaden in his next fight. He would hold those titles until 1997.

== Undercard ==
Confirmed bouts:

Winner	Loser	Weight division/title belt(s) disputed	Result
(Dominican Republic) Luis Santana	(United States) Terry Norris	WBC World super welterweight title	3rd round DQ.
(Mexico) Julio César Chávez	(Italy) Giovanni Parisi	WBC World super lightweight title	Unanimous Decision.
(Puerto Rico) Félix Trinidad	(United States) Roger Turner	IBF World welterweight title	2nd-round TKO
(United States) Bruce Seldon	(United States) Tony Tucker	vacant WBA World heavyweight title	7th-round RTD
Non-TV bouts
(United States) Carl Daniels	(United States) James Mason	Middleweight (10 rounds)	7th round RTD.
(South Africa) Frans Botha	(United States) Willie Jake	Heavyweight (8 rounds)	Unanimous Decision.
(United Kingdom) Henry Akinwande	(United States) Calvin Jones	Heavyweight (8 rounds)	2nd-round KO.
(United States) Tim Austin	(United States) Javier Diaz	Bantamweight (8 rounds)	1st round Technical Draw.
(Ghana) Nana Konadu	(United States) Robert Parra	Super Bantamweight (8 rounds)	1st-round KO.
(United States) James Stanton	(Mexico) Javier Diaz	Heavyweight (6 rounds)	6th round PTS.

== Broadcasting ==
Country	Broadcaster
Mexico	TV Azteca
United States	Showtime

Preceded by vs. Lennox Lewis	Oliver McCall's bouts 8 April 1995	Succeeded by vs. Frank Bruno
Preceded by vs. Jesse Ferguson	Larry Holmes's bouts 8 April 1995	Succeeded by vs. Ed Donaldson
