= Lennox Lewis vs. Phil Jackson =

Boxing competition

- Date: May 6, 1994
- Venue: Convention Hall, Atlantic City, New Jersey, U.S.
- Title on the line: WBC Heavyweight Championship

Tale of the tape
Boxer	Lennox Lewis	Phil Jackson
Nickname	The Lion	The Enforcer
Hometown	London, England	Miami, Florida, U.S.
Purse	$4,000,000	$500,000
Pre-fight record	24–0 (20 KO)	30–1 (27 KO)
Age	28 years, 8 months	29 years, 11 months
Height	6 ft 5 in (196 cm)	6 ft 1 in (185 cm)
Weight	235 lb (107 kg)	218 lb (99 kg)
Style	Orthodox	Orthodox
Recognition	WBC; Heavyweight Champion; The Ring; No. 3 Ranked Heavyweight	WBC; No. 5 Ranked Heavyweight; The Ring; No. 9 Ranked Heavyweight

Result
- Lewis wins via 8th-round technical knockout

Lennox Lewis vs. Phil Jackson was a professional boxing match contested on May 6, 1994 for the WBC heavyweight world championship.

== Background ==
After being awarded the WBC title in December 1992, Lennox Lewis would go on to make two successful defenses. First, Lewis took on WBC's number one ranked heavyweight Tony Tucker and defeated him by a lopsided unanimous decision. Then, Lewis met countryman Frank Bruno. Bruno gave Lewis trouble through the first six rounds and two judge's had the bout tied while the third had Bruno ahead by four points, but Lewis was able to rebound in round 7 and achieve a technical knockout victory after the referee stopped the fight as Bruno was being pummeled against the ropes by Lewis. Following his victory over Bruno, there were talks about a possible unification match with the WBA and IBF Heavyweight champion Evander Holyfield, who had defeated Riddick Bowe in a rematch to reclaim the titles, but Holyfield was unsure if he would continue boxing and chose to forgo the match. As a result, Lewis' next opponent became little-known Phil Jackson, who sported an impressive 30–1, but had faced mostly journeymen throughout his professional career and had been dominated by heavyweight contender Donovan "Razor" Ruddock before being knocked out by Ruddock in the fourth round of their 1992 match. Jackson was given virtually no chance of beating Lewis and came into the fight as a 16–1 underdog. Jackson and his trainer Pat Burns blamed Jackson's loss to Ruddock on lack of training and vowed to be ready when it came time to face Lewis.

== The fight ==
Lewis would dominate the match from the opening round. Within the fight's first 30 seconds, Lewis was able to land a right hand that knocked Jackson to the canvas. Lewis would continue his dominance over Jackson winning the first four rounds on all three of the judge's scorecards. Late in round 5, Lewis would gain a second knockdown over Jackson after landing a straight right hand to Jackson's face. Jackson remained on the mat until the referee got to the count of nine and continued with the fight. With less than 10 seconds remaining in the round, Lewis tried to quickly land a combination on Jackson in hopes of gaining the knockout victory, but the bell rang just as he was able to knock Jackson down for the third time. Because the bell had rung, Lewis had a point deducted on the judge's scorecards. Lewis would further dominate Jackson in rounds six and seven before finally ending the fight 1:35 into round eight after dropping Jackson for the third time in the fight with a four-punch combination. Immediately after the knockdown, referee Arthur Mercante Sr. stopped the fight and Lewis was named the winner by technical knockout.

== Aftermath ==
Lewis entered into negotiations with both the WBA and IBF Michael Moorer and former Olympics rival Riddick Bowe, before signing to face Bowe following a mandatory defence against the largely unheralded Oliver McCall.

== Undercard ==
Confirmed bouts:

== Broadcasting ==
Country	Broadcaster
United Kingdom	Sky Sports
United States	HBO

Preceded by vs. Frank Bruno	Lennox Lewis's bouts May 6, 1994	Succeeded by vs. Oliver McCall
Preceded by vs. Eddie Gonzales	Phil Jackson's bouts May 6, 1994	Succeeded by vs. Art Card
