= Mike Tyson vs. Frank Bruno =

Boxing competition

This Time It's War
- Date: February 25, 1989
- Venue: Las Vegas Hilton, Nevada, US
- Title(s) on the line: WBA, WBC, IBF and The Ring undisputed heavyweight championship

Tale of the tape
Boxer	Mike Tyson	Frank Bruno
Nickname	Iron	
Hometown	Catskill, New York, U.S.	London, England
Purse	$7,000,000	$3,600,000
Pre-fight record	35–0 (31 KO)	32–2 (31 KO)
Age	22 years, 7 months	27 years, 3 months
Height	5 ft 10 in (178 cm)	6 ft 3 in (191 cm)
Weight	218 lb (99 kg)	228 lb (103 kg)
Style	Orthodox	Orthodox
Recognition	WBA, WBC, IBF and The Ring undisputed Heavyweight Champion	WBA/WBC; No. 1 Ranked Heavyweight; IBF; No. 3 Ranked Heavyweight

Result
- Tyson wins via 5th-round technical knockout

Mike Tyson vs Frank Bruno, billed as This Time It's War, was a professional boxing match contested on February 25, 1989 for the WBA, WBC, IBF and The Ring heavyweight championships.

== Background ==
This would be Tyson's first fight after firing longtime trainer Kevin Rooney. Tyson was coming off a 1st-round knockout over the previously undefeated Michael Spinks, which not only gave Tyson the lineal heavyweight title, but laid to rest any doubt over who was the rightful heavyweight champion. Next for Tyson was a bout against popular British fighter Frank Bruno that was originally set for October 8, 1988 at Wembley Stadium in Bruno's native England. However, on August 23, 1988, Tyson was involved in a street fight with former adversary Mitch Green, whom Tyson had defeated prior to his Championship fight with Trevor Berbick. During the scuffle Tyson hit Green with a right hand that resulted in Green requiring five stitches and Tyson breaking his hand. Due to Tyson's injury, the fight was pushed back to October 22. This was only the beginning of Tyson's troubles. On September 5, Tyson was involved in a car accident that knocked him unconscious A month later, Tyson's estranged wife Robin Givens filed for divorce on October 7 and in the following month filed a $125 million defamation suit against Tyson as well.

Because of Tyson's problems, the proposed October 22 fight against Bruno at Wembley Stadium was scrapped. Instead the fight was shifted to the United States and rescheduled for January 14, 1989 at the Las Vegas Hilton. However, this fight was also postponed, allegedly because of financial disagreements between Tyson's manager Bill Cayton and Tyson's promoter Don King. On December 15, 1988, it was officially announced that the long-awaited Tyson–Bruno fight would finally take place on February 25, 1989 at the Las Vegas Hilton.

== The fight ==
The fight got off to a fast start with the two men exchanging punches in the middle of the ring as soon as the round started. At the end of this opening exchange, Tyson would knock down Bruno with a right hook, though Bruno was able to get up at the count of 2, ultimately taking a mandatory eight count before continuing. Tyson and Bruno would continue to fight aggressively, but after several warnings from referee Richard Steele, Bruno had a point deducted due to excessive holding. With about 50 seconds left in the first round, Bruno hit Tyson with a left hook–right hand combination to the side of the head that staggered the champion for the first time ever in his professional career. At the end of round 2, Tyson hit Bruno with a right hand that sent Bruno into the ropes. Sensing a knockout, Tyson would continue to hammer Bruno, but Bruno was able to hold on and smother Tyson and survive the round. Tyson continued to dominate the fight into round 5 and, with a minute left in the round, would continuously attack Bruno with powerful combinations. The fight would finally end with less than 10 seconds to go in the round as Tyson was able to get Bruno up against the ropes and hit him with two right uppercuts and a left hook. Before Bruno could go down, Steele stepped in and stopped the fight, awarding Tyson the victory by technical knockout.

== Aftermath ==
Tyson had only one further fight in 1989. In what turned out to be the last successful defense of his undisputed championship, Tyson easily defeated Carl Williams, knocking him out 93 seconds into round 1. After a seven-month layoff, Tyson returned to face James "Buster" Douglas, in what was presumed by most people to be another straightforward practice fight for Tyson before he would meet the number one contender Evander Holyfield. In a shocking upset, Douglas won by 10th-round knockout, becoming the new undisputed heavyweight champion.

Tyson then embarked on a comeback in hopes of securing a championship match with either Douglas or Evander Holyfield, who were scheduled to face each other for the undisputed heavyweight title on October 25, 1990. Tyson defeated Henry Tillman, Alex Stewart and Donovan Ruddock twice, before being arrested and sentenced to prison for rape. When Tyson was released in 1995, he returned to boxing and easily defeated journeymen Peter McNeeley and Buster Mathis, Jr.

This set up a rematch with Bruno for Bruno's recently-won WBC heavyweight championship title, which he had achieved six months previously by beating the reigning WBC champion Oliver McCall by a unanimous points decision. In the rematch on March 16 1996, Tyson again dominated Bruno, knocking him out in the third round to become the WBC heavyweight champion. This was Bruno's final fight and he subsequently retired from boxing.

== Undercard ==
Confirmed bouts:

== Broadcasting ==
Country	Broadcaster
Mexico	Televisa
Philippines	GMA Network
United Kingdom	BBC
United States	HBO

Preceded by vs. Michael Spinks	Mike Tyson's bouts 25 February 1989	Succeeded by vs. Carl Williams
Preceded by vs. Joe Bugner	Frank Bruno's bouts 25 February 1989	Succeeded by vs. John Emmen
