= Lennox Lewis vs. Lionel Butler =

Boxing competition

- Date: May 13, 1995
- Venue: ARCO Arena, Sacramento, California, U.S.

Tale of the tape
Boxer	Lennox Lewis	Lionel Butler
Nickname	The Lion	The Train
Hometown	London, England	Venice, California, U.S.
Pre-fight record	25–1 (21 KO)	22–10–1 (1) (17 KO)
Age	29 years, 8 months	27 years, 9 months
Height	6 ft 5 in (196 cm)	5 ft 11 in (180 cm)
Weight	248 lb (112 kg)	261 lb (118 kg)
Style	Orthodox	Orthodox
Recognition	WBC; No. 2 Ranked Heavyweight; WBA; No. 7 Ranked Heavyweight; IBF; No. 8 Ranked Heavyweight; The Ring; No. 5 Ranked Heavyweight; Former WBC heavyweight champion	WBC; No. 3 Ranked Heavyweight; WBA; No. 4 Ranked Heavyweight; IBF; No. 11 Ranked Heavyweight; The Ring; No. 10 Ranked Heavyweight

Result
- Lewis wins via 5th round technical knockout

Lennox Lewis vs. Lionel Butler was a professional boxing match contested on May 13, 1995. The fight was a WBC "eliminator" bout with the winner scheduled to become the number one contender for the WBC heavyweight title.

== Background ==
Lennox Lewis' previous fight had been a WBC heavyweight title defense against Oliver McCall. The then-undefeated Lewis entered the fight as an overwhelming favorite over the little-known McCall, however, McCall would stun the champion and the boxing world after landing a quick right hand that dropped Lewis. Lewis was able to get back up, but was wobbly and the referee called off the bout 31 seconds into the second round, giving McCall the upset victory and the WBC heavyweight title. Lewis attempted to quickly get a rematch and offered McCall $10 million to accept, but McCall refused and instead moved on to make the first defense against the aging Larry Holmes. Forced to go down the comeback trail, Lewis was matched up with the WBC's number two heavyweight Lionel Butler to determine who would be next in line for a title shot. Butler had turned around his career, going from a journeyman loser with a record of 6–10–1 in his first 17, to a bona fide heavyweight contender after stringing together 16 consecutive knockout victories (though one was rescinded after Butler failed a post-fight drug test) to bring his record up to 22–10–1. This was also Lewis' first fight with legendary trainer Emanuel Steward in his corner. Steward had previously been the head trainer of Don King-promoted fighters Oliver McCall (then the WBC heavyweight champion) and Julio César Chávez (then the WBC light welterweight champion), but Steward opted to leave both fighters, as well as the chance to train boxing's most popular fighter, Mike Tyson, in order to train Lewis.

The Lewis–Butler bout was part of a doubleheader boxing event that also included Michael Moorer (IBF:2nd, WBA:6th, WBC:12th & The Ring:4th), who like Lewis, had lost a heavyweight title in his previous match, dropping the unified WBA and IBF versions of the title to George Foreman the previous year. Initially, Moorer was set to face Tim Puller, but a broken hand forced Puller to pull out of the fight. Instead Moorer faced the then-up-and-coming prospect Melvin Foster. Moorer would defeat Foster by a lopsided 10-round unanimous decision with three scores of 99–91 (nine rounds to one).

== The fight ==
Butler came into the fight well out-of-shape at 261 pounds, 30 pounds heavier than when he had started his 16-fight knockout streak in 1991, and was dominated by Lewis for the duration of the fight. Butler started the fight aggressively, hoping to catch the much taller Lewis with his powerful right hook and score an early knockout victory, even scoring with a hard right hand in the fight's first minute. Lewis, however, would use his distinct height advantage and vastly outboxed his much shorter opponent, winning all of the first four rounds on the judge's scorecards. In the fifth round, Lewis would finally end the fight. Almost immediately after the bell rang to signify the start of the round, Lewis would send Butler to the canvas after landing a right–left combination. Butler would get up, and following a clinch break by the referee just before the first minute expired, unloaded a huge right hand that Lewis ducked. Lewis then shoved Butler down to the canvas, though it did not count as a knockdown and Lewis was warned by the referee. Lewis would spend the rest of the round picking apart the clearly exhausted Butler before sending Butler down again with a right hand just before the end of the round. After the knockdown, the referee ended the fight and Lewis was named the winner by technical knockout at 2:55 of the fifth round.

== Aftermath ==
Lewis' victory was originally supposed to make him the mandatory challenger for the WBC heavyweight title, which McCall was to defend against Frank Bruno later in the year on September 2. Bruno would win the title after defeating McCall by unanimous decision, however, the WBC bumped Lewis aside and instead made the returning Mike Tyson their number one contender, giving him the first shot at Bruno. Lewis would threaten the WBC with legal action in attempt to gain the title match with Bruno, but the WBC would ultimately rule in favor of Tyson.

== Undercard ==
Confirmed bouts:

Winner	Loser	Weight division/title belt(s) disputed	Result
(United States) Michael Moorer	(United States) Melvin Foster*	Heavyweight (10 rounds)	Unanimous decision.
Non-TV bouts
(United States) Willie Jorrín	(Mexico) Max Maldonado	Featherweight (10 rounds)	8th-round TKO.
(United States) Robert Allen	(Mexico) Eduardo Ayala	Middleweight (8 rounds)	Unanimous decision.
(Mexico) Jose Luis Noyola	(Mexico) Paulino Gonzalez	Featherweight (6 rounds)	Majority decision.
(Republic of Ireland) Kevin McBride	(United Kingdom) Atelea Kaihea	Heavyweight (6 rounds)	1st-round KO.

- Melvin Foster was a late replacement for the injured Tim Puller

== Broadcasting ==
Country	Broadcaster
Mexico	TV Azteca
United Kingdom	Eurosport (Live) / BBC (Delayed)
United States	HBO

Preceded by vs. Oliver McCall	Lennox Lewis's bouts 13 May 1995	Succeeded by vs. Justin Fortune
Preceded by vs. James Flowers	Lionel Butler's bouts 13 May 1995	Succeeded by vs. Mauricio Villegas
