= Lennox Lewis =

British and Canadian boxer (born 1965)

Lennox Lewis CM CBE
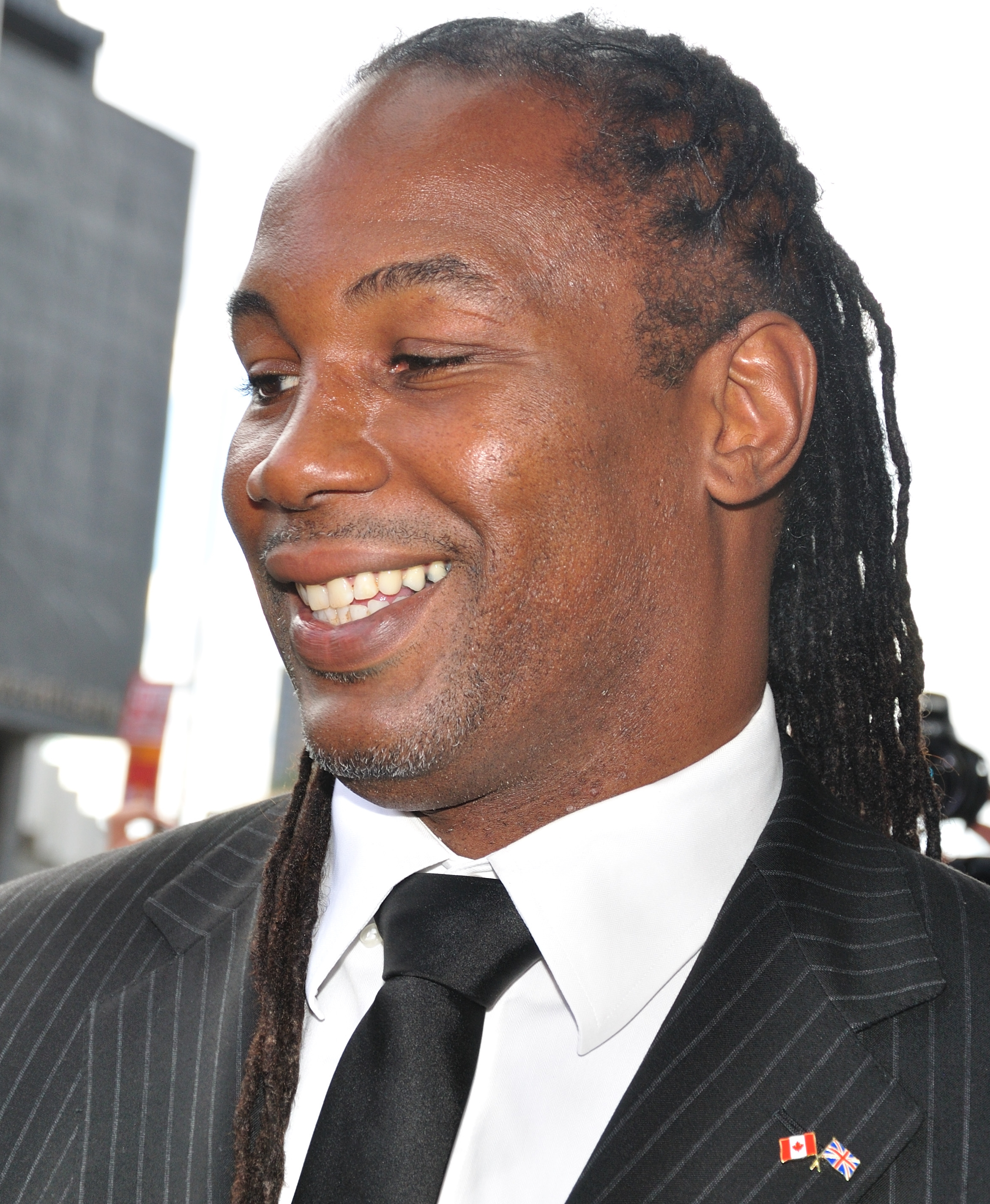
- Lewis in 2010
- Born: Lennox Claudius Lewis; 2 September 1965 (age 61); London, England
- Citizenship: United Kingdom; Canada
- Education: Cameron Heights Collegiate Institute
- Boxing career
- Nickname: The Lion
- Height: 6 ft 5 in (196 cm)
- Weight: Heavyweight
- Reach: 84 in (213 cm)
- Stance: Orthodox

Boxing record
- Total fights: 44
- Wins: 41
- Win by KO: 32
- Losses: 2
- Draws: 1
Medal record
Men's amateur boxing
Representing Canada
Olympic Games
Gold medal – first place	1988 Seoul	Super-heavyweight
Commonwealth Games
Gold medal – first place	1986 Edinburgh	Super-heavyweight
Pan American Games
Silver medal – second place	1987 Indianapolis	Super-heavyweight
North American Championships
Gold medal – first place	1985 Beaumont	Super-heavyweight
Gold medal – first place	1987 Toronto	Super-heavyweight
World Cup
Silver medal – second place	1985 Seoul	Super-heavyweight
Junior World Championships
Gold medal – first place	1983 Santo Domingo	Super-heavyweight

Lennox Claudius Lewis (born 2 September 1965) is a boxing commentator and former professional boxer who competed in the heavyweight division from 1989 to 2003. He was a three-time world champion, a two-time lineal champion, and held the undisputed championship. (Note: Three-belt era: World Boxing Association (WBA), World Boxing Council (WBC), and International Boxing Federation (IBF) titles.) Holding dual British and Canadian citizenship, Lewis represented Canada as an amateur at the 1984 and 1988 Olympics, winning the super-heavyweight gold medal in 1988. Lewis is regarded by many as one of the greatest heavyweight boxers of all time, and is considered among the greatest British and Canadian boxers in history.

In his first three years as a professional, Lewis won several regional heavyweight championships, including the European, British, and Commonwealth titles. After winning his first 21 fights, he defeated Donovan Ruddock in 1992 to take over the number one position in the World Boxing Council (WBC) rankings. He was declared WBC heavyweight champion later that year after Riddick Bowe gave up the title, refusing to defend it against Lewis. He defended the title three times before an upset knockout loss to Oliver McCall in 1994. Lewis avenged the loss in a 1997 rematch to regain the vacant WBC title.

Two fights against Evander Holyfield in 1999 (the first ending in a controversial draw while the rematch was won via unanimous decision) saw Lewis become undisputed heavyweight champion by unifying his WBC title with Holyfield's World Boxing Association (WBA) and International Boxing Federation (IBF) titles. In 2000, the WBA stripped Lewis of his title when he chose to face Michael Grant in April instead of mandatory challenger John Ruiz. Similarly, the IBF stripped Lewis of their title in 2002 when he chose not to face their mandatory challenger Chris Byrd.

Lewis was knocked out by Hasim Rahman in an upset in 2001, but this defeat was avenged later in the year, with Lewis regaining the WBC and IBF titles. In 2002, Lewis defeated Mike Tyson in one of the most highly anticipated fights in boxing history. Prior to the event, Lewis was awarded the Ring magazine heavyweight title, which had been discontinued in the late 1980s. In what would be his final fight, Lewis defeated Vitali Klitschko by stoppage in 2003. He eventually vacated his remaining titles and retired from boxing in February 2004.

== Early life ==
Lewis was born on 2 September 1965 in West Ham, London, to Jamaican immigrant parents and according to his mother, he would often fight with other children growing up. At birth he weighed 4.8 kg (10 lb 10 oz), and was given the name Lennox by the doctor, who said "he looked like a Lennox."

Lewis moved to Kitchener, Ontario, Canada with his mother in 1977 at the age of 12. He attended Cameron Heights Collegiate Institute for high school, where he excelled in Canadian football, soccer, and basketball. In the 1982–83 school year, he helped the school's AAA basketball team win the Ontario provincial championship.

== Amateur career ==
Lewis eventually decided that his favourite sport was boxing. He took up boxing circa 1978. He became a dominant amateur boxer and won the gold medal at the Junior World Championships in 1983. At age 18, Lewis represented Canada in the super-heavyweight division at the 1984 Summer Olympics in Los Angeles. By that time he was ranked #6 in the world by the AIBA. He advanced to the quarter-finals, where he lost by decision to Tyrell Biggs of the US, who went on to win the gold medal. Despite being 6'5" tall, and having a very strong punch, his coaches admitted they had to pressure him to convert size and raw talent into aggression. His amateur boxing coaches were Arnie Boehm and Adrian Teodorescu, who guided Lewis to the Olympic title in 1988.

"I think in the first fight I was just trying to knock him out, trying to prove my stuff because a lot of people thought the Cubans were unbeatable. I didn't think so at all. I just wanted to go out there and prove it by knocking him out. I guess that was a bit too much. I should have stuck to my natural talent and boxed."

— Lennox Lewis on his two fights versus Jorge Luis González in August 1987

Lewis chose not to turn professional after the Olympics, and instead fought four more years as an amateur, hoping for a second chance to win a gold medal. At the 1986 World Championships, he lost in the preliminary round to Petar Stoimenov of Bulgaria. Later that year, Lewis won gold at the Commonwealth Games. He had a close fight against Cuban Jorge Luis González at the 1987 Pan American Games super-heavyweight finals: the American judge scored the bout in favour of Lewis 60–57, while the judges from the Dominican Republic, Venezuela and Uruguay scored the bout 59–58 for González. He avenged the loss shortly thereafter, boxing for the North American amateur title eight days later.

After winning several more amateur titles in the following years, he travelled to Seoul, South Korea, for the 1988 Summer Olympics and achieved his goal. In the gold medal final, Lewis defeated Riddick Bowe with a second-round referee stopped contest (RSC). Lewis became the first super-heavyweight gold medallist to become world heavyweight champion as a professional. In the Games' closing ceremony, Lewis was Canada's flag bearer. Lewis became the first Canadian to win boxing gold in 56 years.

Lewis, upon turning professional, had registered an amateur record of 85–9. HBO Boxing credited him with a shorter amateur record of 75 wins (58 by knockout) and 7 losses. Of all losses on the record, Valeriy Abadzhyan of the Soviet Union was the only opponent to stop Lewis in amateurs, in October 1986.

After winning the Olympic gold, Lewis was approached immediately by big-time American boxing promoters, including Bob Arum. However, he was not overly impressed by their contract offers and thought about signing a professional contract with a Toronto-based promotion group. "I feel like a basketball player being scouted by scouts down in the States. I don't want anyone controlling me. These (offers) coming to me after the Olympics are mainly because I won the gold."

== Professional career ==
=== Early career ===
Having achieved his goal, Lewis declared himself a professional and moved back to his native England. He claimed he had always considered himself British, but one article reported that many British fans regarded him as "a Canadian at heart and a Briton for convenience." In 2015 Lewis explained "When I turned pro, I had to go to the United Kingdom in order to pursue my career. The infrastructure to develop boxers wasn't in Canada then."

Lewis signed with boxing promoter Frank Maloney and his early professional career was filled with knockouts of journeymen, as well as fighters such as Osvaldo Ocasio.

=== British, Commonwealth and European champion ===
After he signed with American promoter Main Events, he won the European heavyweight title in 1990 against Frenchman Jean Maurice Chanet. In his next fight in March 1991, Lewis won the British title against undefeated, world-ranked Gary Mason, and in April 1992 won the Commonwealth title against Derek Williams. Lewis was a top-five world heavyweight, and during this period he also defeated former WBA heavyweight champion Mike Weaver, 1984 Olympic Gold medalist Tyrell Biggs, former world cruiserweight title holders Glenn McCrory and trial horses Levi Billups and Mike Dixon.

On 31 October 1992, Lewis knocked out Canadian Donovan "Razor" Ruddock in two rounds for the number one contender's position in the WBC rankings. It was Lewis's most impressive win to date and established him as one of the world's best heavyweights. Sportscaster Larry Merchant declared, "We have a great new heavyweight."

=== First reign as WBC heavyweight champion ===
The win over Ruddock made Lewis the mandatory challenger for Riddick Bowe's heavyweight championship. Bowe held a press conference during which he threw his WBC title belt in a rubbish bin, relinquishing it to avoid a mandatory defence against Lewis. On 14 December 1992, the WBC declared Lewis its champion, making him the first world heavyweight titleholder from Britain in the 20th century.

Lewis defended the belt three times, defeating Tony Tucker, whom he knocked down for the first time in Tucker's career, and Frank Bruno and Phil Jackson by knockout. The Lennox Lewis vs. Frank Bruno fight was the first time two British-born boxers fought for a version of the world heavyweight title in the modern era.

==== Lewis vs. McCall ====
Lewis lost his WBC title to Oliver McCall on 24 September 1994 in a huge upset at the Wembley Arena in London. In the second round, McCall landed a powerful right cross, putting Lewis on his back. Lewis returned to his feet at the count of six, but stumbled forward into the referee in a daze. Referee Jose Guadalupe Garcia felt Lewis was unable to continue and ended the fight, giving McCall the title by technical knockout. Lewis and others argued the stoppage was premature and that a champion should be given the benefit of the doubt. In spite of the Lewis camp protests, Boxing Monthly editor Glynn Leach pointed out that Lewis "only seemed to recover his senses once the fight was waved off", and that "in the opinions of everyone I spoke to at ringside, the decision was correct."

After the fight, Lewis decided he needed a new trainer to replace Pepe Correa, who had become increasingly difficult to work with. Correa denounced Lewis in public after being fired. Renowned trainer Emanuel Steward, who had been McCall's trainer during their fight, was Lewis's choice. Even before the fight with McCall, Steward had seen much potential in Lewis and immediately expressed a desire to work with him. He corrected several of Lewis's technical flaws, which included maintaining a more balanced stance, less reliance on his cross, and a focus on using a strong, authoritative jab; the latter of which would become a hallmark of Lewis's style throughout the rest of his career. Their partnership lasted until Lewis's retirement.

=== Second reign as WBC heavyweight champion ===
In his first comeback fight, Lewis was given a chance to fight for the mandatory challenger position within the WBC and won it by knocking out American contender Lionel Butler. However, at the behest of promoter Don King, the WBC bypassed him and gave Mike Tyson the first chance at the title recently won by Briton Frank Bruno from Oliver McCall. Bruno had previously lost to both Lewis and Tyson.

Lewis had the number 1 contender's slot in the WBC rankings when he knocked out Australian Justin Fortune, then defeated former WBO Champion Tommy Morrison in October 1995, winning the minor IBC title. This was followed by a close majority decision win over Olympic gold medallist and former WBO champion Ray Mercer in May 1996. Lewis successfully sued to force Tyson to make a mandatory defence of the WBC title against him. Lewis was offered a $13.5 million guarantee to fight Tyson to settle the lawsuit, but turned it down. This would have been Lewis's highest fight purse to date. Lewis accepted $4 million from Don King to step aside and allow Tyson to fight Bruce Seldon instead, with a guarantee that if Tyson defeated Seldon, he would fight Lewis next. After winning the WBA title from Seldon, Tyson relinquished the WBC title to fight Evander Holyfield instead. The WBC title was declared vacant. This set up a rematch between Lewis and McCall, who met on 7 February 1997 in Las Vegas for the WBC title.

In one of the strangest fights in boxing history, McCall, who had lost the first three rounds, refused to box in the fourth and fifth rounds. He then began crying in the ring, forcing the referee to stop the fight and award Lewis the victory and the title. As newly recrowned WBC champion, Lewis successfully defended the title in 1997 against fellow Briton and former WBO world champion Henry Akinwande, who was disqualified after five rounds for excessive clinching. Lewis then met Poland's Andrew Golota, whom he knocked out in the first round. Lewis retained the WBC world title in 1998 when he knocked out lineal champion Shannon Briggs, who had recently outpointed George Foreman in a controversial fight to win the lineal title in five rounds, and beat formerly undefeated European champion Željko Mavrović from Croatia in a 12-round unanimous decision. Lewis stated in 2006 that his fight with Mavrovic was the most awkward win of his career.

=== Undisputed heavyweight champion ===
==== Lewis vs. Holyfield ====
On 13 March 1999, Lewis faced WBA and IBF title holder Evander Holyfield in New York City in what was supposed to be a heavyweight unification bout. Lewis fought a tactical fight, keeping Holyfield off balance with a long jab and peppering him with powerful combinations throughout the bout. Although most observers in the media believed Lewis had clearly won the fight, the bout was declared a draw, to much controversy.

The raw statistics of the fight suggested the bout belonged to Lewis, who landed 348 punches compared to Holyfield's 130. Lewis also out-jabbed Holyfield 137 to 52. Judge Eugenia Williams, who scored the fight in Holyfield's favour, said she saw Lewis land fewer punches than Holyfield. The camps of both fighters agreed to an immediate rematch with both fighters receiving equal purses of $15 million.

==== Lewis vs. Holyfield II ====
The sanctioning bodies ordered a rematch. Eight months later in Las Vegas (13 November 1999), the two men fought again in a more competitive contest than the original fight, with the two boxers having some heavy exchanges from rounds six to nine. The punch stats however still clearly favoured Lewis, who landed 195 punches to Holyfield's 137, although Lewis landed 119 power shots and 76 jabs, showing a definite shift in his tactics from the first fight, when he focused more on the jab. This time the three judges scored the fight unanimously (115–113, 116–112 and 117–111) in favour of Lewis, who became undisputed heavyweight champion of the World. The British public voted Lewis the 1999 BBC Sports Personality of the Year.

Though not as contentiously disputed as in their first bout, the result of the rematch was also challenged as numerous media sources and observers felt Holyfield should have won a decision or kept his unified championship with a draw. Some writers and reporters speculated that the verdict for Lewis had been a form of retribution for the controversial results of the prior bout.

Lewis did not view either bout with Evander Holyfield as among his most difficult, but conceded Holyfield tested his limits more than any other boxer.

"People seem to be genuinely surprised when I tell them Holyfield was my toughest opponent, not to be confused with my toughest fight, which was Ray Mercer, but when you really dive into why that is, it actually makes a lot of sense."

=== First reign as unified heavyweight champion ===
After Lewis defeated Holyfield the WBA ordered Lewis to defend the title against John Ruiz of Chelsea, Massachusetts, who was then an obscure Don King fighter who had been made the WBA's number one-ranked contender. The WBA gave permission for Lewis to fight his WBC mandatory Michael Grant first if he would fight Ruiz next, to which Lewis agreed. Opposed to this, King challenged this decision in court on the basis of a clause in the Lewis-Holyfield rematch contract that said Lewis's first bout as undisputed champion would be against the WBA's number one contender. Lewis was therefore to be stripped of his WBA belt if he fought Grant first. It was because of this that the WBA instated its "Super Champion" title, giving unified titleholders who also hold a WBA belt more time to defend against mandatory challengers.

Lewis proceeded to fight the 203 cm (6 foot 7 inch) American Michael Grant, whom he considered the best contender available. He successfully defended his WBC, IBO and IBF titles against Grant with a second-round knockout victory in Madison Square Garden in April 2000.

Later that same year, Lewis knocked out South African Francois Botha in two rounds in London, before winning a 12-round decision against New Zealander and IBF mandatory opponent, David Tua in Las Vegas.

==== Lewis vs. Rahman ====
On 21 April 2001, Lewis was knocked out by 20-to-1 underdog Hasim Rahman in a bout at Carnival City Casino in South Africa. The main event actually took place on Sunday 22 April 2001 at 05:00 local time in order to accommodate HBOs significant United States–based audience at a reasonable hour on the Saturday night. Before the bout, Lewis had a role in the film Ocean's Eleven in which he "boxed" against Wladimir Klitschko.

=== Second reign as unified heavyweight champion ===
==== Lewis vs. Rahman II ====
Lewis immediately sought a rematch with the new champion; Rahman, however, now being promoted by Don King, tried to secure another opponent for his inaugural title defence. Lewis took Rahman to court to honour the rematch clause in their contract. Rahman was ordered to honour the clause and give Lewis a rematch in his first title defence. While promoting the rematch with Rahman on ESPN's Up Close, the fighters got into a brawl similar to the one between Muhammad Ali and Joe Frazier in front of Howard Cosell on Wide World of Sports. Lewis regained the title on 17 November by outclassing and then knocking out Hasim Rahman in the fourth round of their rematch.

==== Lewis vs. Tyson ====
On 8 June 2002, Lewis defended his title against Mike Tyson. Ticket sales were slow because they were priced as high as US$2,400, but a crowd of 15,327 turned up to see boxing's then biggest event at the Pyramid Arena in Memphis, Tennessee. Tyson also had to pay Lewis $335,000 out of his purse for biting him at the news conference announcing the fight, which was originally scheduled for 6 April 2002 in Las Vegas. Las Vegas, however, rejected the fight because of Tyson's licensing problems and several other states refused Tyson a licence before Memphis finally bid US$12 million to land it.

By the end of the seventh round Tyson was tired and sluggish, his face swollen and his eyes cut. He was knocked out in the eighth by a right cross. After the fight, George Foreman declared, "He [Lewis] is, no doubt, the best heavyweight of all time. What he's done clearly puts him on top of the heap." This was the highest-grossing event in pay-per-view history, generating US$106.9 million from 1.95 million buys in the US, until it was surpassed by De La Hoya-Mayweather in 2007. Both fighters were guaranteed US$17.5 million.

==== Lewis vs. Klitschko ====
Lewis was forced to vacate the IBF title in 2002 after refusing to face mandatory challenger Chris Byrd. In May 2003, Lewis sued boxing promoter Don King for US$385 million, claiming that King used threats and bribery to have Tyson pull out of a rematch with Lewis and a fight on the card of a Lewis title defence.

Lewis scheduled a fight with Kirk Johnson for June, but when Johnson suffered an injury in training, Lewis fought Vitali Klitschko, the WBC's No. 1 contender and former WBO champion. Lewis had planned to fight him in December, but since Klitschko had been on the undercard of the Johnson fight anyway, they agreed to square off on 21 June. Lewis entered the ring at a career high 116 kg (256 1/2 pounds). Lewis was dominated in the early rounds and was wobbled in round two by solid Klitschko punches. Lewis opened a cut above Klitschko's eye with a right cross in the third round and gave a better showing from the fourth round onwards. With both fighters looking tired before the start of round seven, the doctor advised that the fight should be stopped because of a severe cut above Klitschko's left eye, awarding Lewis victory by RTD. Klitschko was leading 58–56 on all three judges' scorecards when the fight was stopped. Lewis was guaranteed US$7 million and Klitschko US$1.4 million. The gate was US$2,523,384 from an attendance of 15,939 at the Staples Center in California. The fight aired live on HBO's World Championship Boxing with approximately 7 million viewers.

Interviewed about the fight by HBO, Dr. Paul Wallace explained his decision to stop the fight:

When he raised his head up, his upper eyelid covered his field of vision. At that point I had no other option but to stop the fight. If he had to move his head to see me, there was no way he could defend his way against a punch.

Klitschko's face required sixty stitches.

Because Klitschko had fought so bravely against Lewis, boxing fans soon began calling for a rematch. The WBC agreed, and kept the Ukrainian as its No. 1 contender. Lewis initially was in favour of a rematch:

I want the rematch, I enjoyed that fight. It was just a fight. We went at it. You have to play dollars and cents but I'm opting more for the rematch.

Negotiations for the rematch followed but Lewis changed his mind. Instead, Klitschko fought and defeated Kirk Johnson on 6 December in WBC Eliminator, setting up a mandatory rematch with Lewis. Lewis announced his retirement shortly thereafter in February 2004, to pursue other interests, including sports management and music promotion, and vacated the title. Lewis said he would not return to the ring. At his retirement, Lewis's record was 41 wins, two losses and one draw, with 32 wins by knockout.

=== Retirement ===
In 2008 when asked about a potential bout after being antagonised by Riddick Bowe, Lewis quipped

"He waits until I am in retirement to call out my name, I will come out of retirement to beat up that guy. I'll beat him up for free."

In 2011, Bowe again confronted Lewis, this time over Twitter, demanding he "put [his] gold medal on and let's fight for that!!", where Lewis remarked "I thought we already did."

Lewis worked as a boxing analyst for HBO on Boxing After Dark from 2006 until 2010.

== Fighting style ==
Lewis was a classic upright boxer, who beat opponents from the outside with his dominant 213 cm (84 inch) reach. His jab, which was often a pawing shot early in his career, became a formidable weapon under the tutelage of Emmanuel Steward, which Lewis used to set up his signature punch, the straight right hand. Under Steward, Lewis became less reliant on his right hand and displayed a more complete skill-set. Criticised at times for being too patient and for his lack of infighting skills, Lewis was at his most effective when boxing from range. Known for his physical strength, Lewis was able to maneuver opponents into punching range and was especially effective against taller opponents. Lewis eventually developed into one of the more complete heavyweights, able to box at range or fight aggressively when necessary, as well as being a hard puncher.

== Legacy ==
Lewis was the seventh Olympic gold medallist to become world heavyweight champion after Floyd Patterson, Muhammad Ali, Joe Frazier, George Foreman, Leon Spinks, and Michael Spinks. He holds the distinction of being the first professional heavyweight champion to win a gold medal in the super-heavyweight category, which was not created until the 1984 Summer Olympics. He is also the only boxer to represent Canada at the Summer Olympics and subsequently win a professional world title. Lewis was the first boxer to hold the British heavyweight title and subsequently win a world title. Although three fighters have since repeated this feat (Herbie Hide, Tyson Fury, and Anthony Joshua), only Lewis also won the Lonsdale belt outright.

While struggling to achieve popularity and respect earlier in his professional career, Lewis's standing has increased since his retirement in 2003, and he is now considered one of the greatest heavyweights of all time. Struggling to win the affection of the British public and facing indifference from an American audience, Lewis's body of work eventually established him as the dominant heavyweight of his time. He was the last undisputed heavyweight champion, until May 2024, when Oleksandr Usyk defeated Tyson Fury.

Lewis became one of only two boxers in history, and the first since Ken Norton in 1978, to have been awarded the heavyweight championship without actually winning a championship bout when the WBC awarded him their title in 1992. This was due to Riddick Bowe relinquishing the title after failing to agree to defend the title against Lewis, who had become the mandatory challenger by defeating Donovan Ruddock a few weeks earlier. In 2001, Lewis became the fourth boxer (after Muhammad Ali, Evander Holyfield and Michael Moorer) to have held the world heavyweight championship on three occasions.

Lewis defeated 15 boxers for the world heavyweight title, the fifth-most in history. His combined three reigns tally 3,086 days (8 years, 5 months and 13 days), which ranks as the fourth-longest cumulative time spent as world heavyweight champion. His total of fourteen successful defences ranks as the fifth-highest in heavyweight history. At four years, two months and fifteen days, Lewis has the twelfth-longest reign in heavyweight championship history. As of December 2024, BoxRec ranks Lennox as the 55th greatest fighter of all time, pound for pound.

In 2018, Boxing News ranked Lewis as the third-greatest heavyweight of all time, behind Muhammad Ali and Joe Louis. While acknowledging that he could occasionally be vulnerable, the magazine stated that at his best, Lewis was as unbeatable as any heavyweight in history. In 2017, Boxing News also ranked Lewis as the second best British fighter of all time, after Jimmy Wilde. In the same year, The Ring magazine ranked Lewis as both the greatest heavyweight of the last thirty years and the joint-eleventh greatest heavyweight of all time (alongside Evander Holyfield), describing him as "a giant who fought with finesse" who beat every available contender. Thomas Hauser stated that the idea of Lewis having no chin was a myth, citing his rising from the powerful punch from Oliver McCall which floored Lewis for the first knockdown of his career, and suggesting that he was perhaps stopped prematurely. He also contended that the knockout punch from Hasim Rahman in their first fight would have knocked out anyone. In 2003, The Ring ranked Lewis 33rd in their list of greatest punchers of all time.

Along with Ingemar Johansson and Rocky Marciano, Lewis is one of three world heavyweight champions to have retired with victories over every opponent he faced as a professional. Unlike Johansson, who lost twice to Floyd Patterson after winning their first bout, Lewis is the only heavyweight to have avenged all his in-ring defeats. He is also, along with Gene Tunney, Marciano and Vitali Klitschko, one of four heavyweight champions to have ended his career as world champion, and with a world title fight victory in his final fight.

In 1999, he was named Fighter of the Year by the Boxing Writers Association of America, as well as BBC Sports Personality of the Year. In 2008, Lewis was inducted into Canada's Sports Hall of Fame. In 2009, in his first year of eligibility, Lewis was inducted into the International Boxing Hall of Fame. He was inducted into the Ontario Sports Hall of Fame in 2012.

== Life outside boxing ==
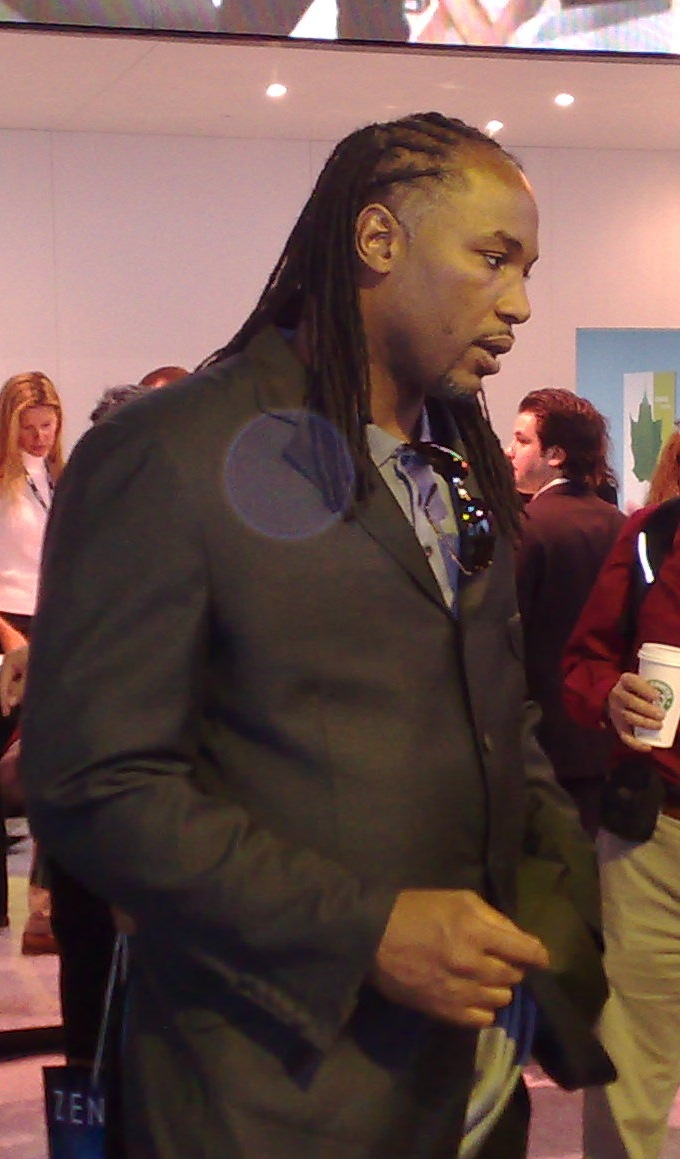
Lewis in 2008

In 2000, Lewis appeared on Reflection Eternal's debut album Train of Thought, giving a shout out on the track "Down for the Count."

In 2001, Lewis had a role in the film Ocean's Eleven in which he "boxed" against Wladimir Klitschko.

In 2002, Lewis was reportedly offered £5m by World Wrestling Entertainment (WWE) chairman Vince McMahon to take up professional wrestling in his industry. His camp held discussions over a possible match with Brock Lesnar in February 2003, at the No Way Out pay-per-view event. Prior to the offer Lewis was familiar with wrestling; he was part of the famous match held in the old Wembley Stadium between The British Bulldog and Bret "The Hitman" Hart for the Intercontinental Championship at SummerSlam in 1992, representing the Bulldog during his entrance while bearing a Union Flag.

In 2002, Lewis played himself on an episode of The Jersey called "It's a Mad Mad Mad Mad Jersey".

In 2003, Lewis made a brief cameo appearance in the Jennifer Lopez and LL Cool J video "All I Have".

In 2006, he appeared in the movie Johnny Was with Vinnie Jones.

Lewis played in the World Series of Poker in both 2006 and 2007, and was knocked out without winning any money.

Lewis appeared on NBC's Celebrity Apprentice in 2008. He came in fourth place (out of 14).

Lewis made a public service announcement against domestic violence for Do Something.

In 2011, he was awarded an honorary Doctorate from Wilfrid Laurier University in Waterloo, Ontario. He also has his own charitable foundation called the Lennox Lewis foundation which helps disadvantaged children in Canada, Jamaica, the United Kingdom, and the United States.

Lewis is a supporter of his home town football club, West Ham United.

On 24 May 2018, Lewis was part of an Oval Office ceremony to announce the pardon of boxer Jack Johnson.

In 2024, Lewis joined fellow London boxers – Frank Bruno, Nigel Benn, and Chris Eubank – for a mini documentary, Four Kings.

== Personal life ==
Lewis is a Christian. He is an avid amateur chess player, and funded an after-school chess programme for disadvantaged youths, one of whom earned a university chess scholarship at Tennessee Tech. He holds both British and Canadian citizenship. He married Violet Chang in 2005 after his retirement from boxing and has four children.

== Professional boxing record ==
44 fights	41 wins	2 losses
By knockout	32	2
By decision	7	0
By disqualification	2	0
Draws	1	

No.	Result	Record	Opponent	Type	Round, time	Date	Age	Location	Notes
44	Win	41–2–1	Vitali Klitschko	RTD	6 (12), 3:00	21 Jun 2003	37 years, 292 days	Staples Center, Los Angeles, California, US	Retained WBC, IBO, and The Ring heavyweight titles
43	Win	40–2–1	Mike Tyson	KO	8 (12), 2:25	8 Jun 2002	36 years, 279 days	The Pyramid, Memphis, Tennessee, US	Retained WBC, IBF, IBO, and The Ring heavyweight titles
42	Win	39–2–1	Hasim Rahman	KO	4 (12), 1:29	17 Nov 2001	36 years, 76 days	Mandalay Bay Events Center, Paradise, Nevada, US	Won WBC, IBF, and IBO heavyweight titles
41	Loss	38–2–1	Hasim Rahman	KO	5 (12), 2:32	22 Apr 2001	35 years, 232 days	Carnival City, Brakpan, South Africa	Lost WBC, IBF, and IBO heavyweight titles
40	Win	38–1–1	David Tua	UD	12	11 Nov 2000	35 years, 70 days	Mandalay Bay Events Center, Paradise, Nevada, US	Retained WBC, IBF, and IBO heavyweight titles
39	Win	37–1–1	Francois Botha	TKO	2 (12), 2:39	15 Jul 2000	34 years, 317 days	London Arena, London, England	Retained WBC, IBF, and IBO heavyweight titles
38	Win	36–1–1	Michael Grant	KO	2 (12), 2:53	29 Apr 2000	34 years, 240 days	Madison Square Garden, New York City, New York, US	Retained WBC, IBF, and IBO heavyweight titles
37	Win	35–1–1	Evander Holyfield	UD	12	13 Nov 1999	34 years, 72 days	Thomas & Mack Center, Paradise, Nevada, US	Retained WBC heavyweight title; Won WBA, IBF, and vacant IBO heavyweight titles
36	Draw	34–1–1	Evander Holyfield	SD	12	13 Mar 1999	33 years, 192 days	Madison Square Garden, New York City, New York, US	Retained WBC heavyweight title; For WBA and IBF heavyweight titles
35	Win	34–1	Željko Mavrović	UD	12	26 Sep 1998	33 years, 24 days	Mohegan Sun Arena, Montville, Connecticut, US	Retained WBC heavyweight title
34	Win	33–1	Shannon Briggs	TKO	5 (12), 1:45	28 Mar 1998	32 years, 207 days	Boardwalk Hall, Atlantic City, New Jersey, US	Retained WBC heavyweight title
33	Win	32–1	Andrew Golota	KO	1 (12), 1:35	4 Oct 1997	32 years, 32 days	Boardwalk Hall, Atlantic City, New Jersey, US	Retained WBC heavyweight title
32	Win	31–1	Henry Akinwande	DQ	5 (12), 2:34	12 Jul 1997	31 years, 313 days	Caesars Tahoe, Stateline, Nevada, US	Retained WBC heavyweight title; Akinwande disqualified for repeated holding
31	Win	30–1	Oliver McCall	TKO	5 (12), 0:55	7 Feb 1997	31 years, 158 days	Las Vegas Hilton, Winchester, Nevada, US	Won vacant WBC heavyweight title
30	Win	29–1	Ray Mercer	MD	10	10 May 1996	30 years, 251 days	Madison Square Garden, New York City, New York, US	
29	Win	28–1	Tommy Morrison	TKO	6 (12), 1:22	7 Oct 1995	30 years, 35 days	Convention Hall, Atlantic City, New Jersey, US	Won IBC heavyweight title
28	Win	27–1	Justin Fortune	TKO	4 (10), 1:48	2 Jul 1995	29 years, 303 days	Point Theatre, Dublin, Ireland	
27	Win	26–1	Lionel Butler	TKO	5 (12), 2:55	13 May 1995	29 years, 253 days	ARCO Arena, Sacramento, California, US	
26	Loss	25–1	Oliver McCall	TKO	2 (12), 0:31	24 Sep 1994	29 years, 22 days	Wembley Arena, London, England	Lost WBC heavyweight title
25	Win	25–0	Phil Jackson	TKO	8 (12), 1:35	6 May 1994	28 years, 246 days	Convention Hall, Atlantic City, New Jersey, US	Retained WBC heavyweight title
24	Win	24–0	Frank Bruno	TKO	7 (12), 1:12	1 Oct 1993	28 years, 29 days	National Stadium, Cardiff, Wales	Retained WBC heavyweight title
23	Win	23–0	Tony Tucker	UD	12	8 May 1993	27 years, 248 days	Thomas & Mack Center, Paradise, Nevada, US	Retained WBC heavyweight title
22	Win	22–0	Donovan Ruddock	TKO	2 (12), 0:46	31 Oct 1992	27 years, 59 days	Earls Court Exhibition Centre, London, England	Retained Commonwealth heavyweight title
21	Win	21–0	Mike Dixon	TKO	4 (10), 1:02	11 Aug 1992	26 years, 344 days	Broadway by the Bay Theater, Atlantic City, New Jersey, US	
20	Win	20–0	Derek Williams	TKO	3 (12), 2:30	30 Apr 1992	26 years, 241 days	Royal Albert Hall, London, England	Retained British and European heavyweight titles; Won Commonwealth heavyweight title
19	Win	19–0	Levi Billups	UD	10	1 Feb 1992	26 years, 152 days	Caesars Palace, Paradise, Nevada, US	
18	Win	18–0	Tyrell Biggs	TKO	3 (10), 2:47	23 Nov 1991	26 years, 82 days	Omni Coliseum, Atlanta, Georgia, US	
17	Win	17–0	Glenn McCrory	KO	2 (12), 1:30	30 Sep 1991	26 years, 28 days	Royal Albert Hall, London, England	Retained British and European heavyweight titles
16	Win	16–0	Mike Weaver	KO	6 (10), 1:05	12 Jul 1991	25 years, 283 days	Caesars Tahoe, Stateline, Nevada, US	
15	Win	15–0	Gary Mason	TKO	7 (12), 0:44	6 Mar 1991	25 years, 185 days	Wembley Arena, London, England	Retained European heavyweight title; Won British heavyweight title
14	Win	14–0	Jean-Maurice Chanet	TKO	6 (12), 0:16	31 Oct 1990	25 years, 59 days	Crystal Palace National Sports Centre, London, England	Won European heavyweight title
13	Win	13–0	Mike Acey	KO	2 (10), 0:34	11 Jul 1990	24 years, 312 days	Superstars Nite Club, Kitchener, Ontario, Canada	
12	Win	12–0	Ossie Ocasio	UD	8	27 Jun 1990	24 years, 298 days	Royal Albert Hall, London, England	
11	Win	11–0	Dan Murphy	TKO	6 (8), 2:11	20 May 1990	24 years, 260 days	Town Hall, Sheffield, England	
10	Win	10–0	Jorge Dascola	KO	1 (8), 2:59	9 May 1990	24 years, 249 days	Royal Albert Hall, London, England	
9	Win	9–0	Michael Simuwelu	TKO	1 (8), 0:58	14 Apr 1990	24 years, 224 days	Royal Albert Hall, London, England	
8	Win	8–0	Calvin Jones	KO	1 (8), 2:34	22 Mar 1990	24 years, 201 days	Leisure Centre, Gateshead, England	
7	Win	7–0	Noel Quarless	TKO	2 (6), 1:25	31 Jan 1990	24 years, 151 days	York Hall, London, England	
6	Win	6–0	Greg Gorrell	TKO	5 (8), 0:51	18 Dec 1989	24 years, 107 days	Memorial Auditorium, Kitchener, Ontario, Canada	
5	Win	5–0	Melvin Epps	DQ	2 (6), 0:30	5 Nov 1989	24 years, 64 days	Royal Albert Hall, London, England	Epps disqualified for not obeying referee's instructions
4	Win	4–0	Steve Garber	KO	1 (6)	10 Oct 1989	24 years, 38 days	City Hall, Hull, England	
3	Win	3–0	Andrew Gerrard	TKO	4 (6), 0:33	25 Sep 1989	24 years, 23 days	Crystal Palace National Sports Centre, London, England	
2	Win	2–0	Bruce Johnson	TKO	2 (6)	21 Jul 1989	23 years, 322 days	Convention Hall, Atlantic City, New Jersey, US	
1	Win	1–0	Al Malcolm	KO	2 (6), 0:19	27 Jun 1989	23 years, 298 days	Royal Albert Hall, London, England	

== Titles in boxing ==
=== Major world titles ===
- WBA heavyweight champion (200+ lbs)
- WBC heavyweight champion (200+ lbs) (3×)
- IBF heavyweight champion (200+ lbs) (2×)

=== The Ring magazine titles ===
- The Ring heavyweight champion (200+ lbs)

=== Minor world titles ===
- IBC heavyweight champion (200+ lbs)
- IBO heavyweight champion (200+ lbs) (2×)

=== Regional/International titles ===
- Lonsdale Belt heavyweight champion (200+ lbs)
- European heavyweight champion (200+ lbs)
- British heavyweight champion (200+ lbs)
- Commonwealth heavyweight champion (200+ lbs)

=== Lineal title ===
- Lineal heavyweight champion (200+ lbs) (2×)

=== Undisputed titles ===
- Undisputed heavyweight champion (200+ lbs)

=== Honorary titles ===
- WBC Emeritus Champion

== Pay-per-view bouts ==
=== United States ===
Date	Fight	Billing	Buys	Revenue
4 October 1997	Lewis vs. Golota	Lewis-Golota	300,000	—N/a
13 March 1999	Holyfield vs. Lewis	Undisputed	1,200,000	$54,000,000
13 November 1999	Holyfield vs. Lewis II	Unfinished Business	850,000	$12,800,000
29 April 2000	Lewis vs. Grant	Two Big	340,000	—N/a
11 November 2000	Lewis vs. Tua	Royal Rampage	420,000	—N/a
17 November 2001	Rahman vs. Lewis II	Final Judgement	460,000	$23,000,000
8 June 2002	Lewis vs. Tyson	Lewis-Tyson: Is On	1,970,000	$106,900,000
Total	7 pay-per-view fights		5,540,000	

=== United Kingdom ===
Date	Fight	Network	Buys	Source(s)
13 March 1999	Evander Holyfield vs. Lennox Lewis	Sky Box Office	400,000	
8 June 2002	Lennox Lewis vs. Mike Tyson	Sky Box Office	750,000	
	Total UK sales	Sky Box Office	1,150,000	

== Amateur bouts and tournaments ==
Ontario Junior Championships (75 kg), Toronto, Ontario, March 1980:

- Lost to Donovan Ruddock (Canada) by split decision, 2–3

Canadian Junior Championships (91 kg), Montreal, Quebec, May 1982:

- Lost to H. Thompson (Canada) by split decision, 2–3

(gold) British Columbia Golden Gloves (91 kg), Toronto, Ontario, May 1982:

- Defeated K. Hataway (Canada) by unanimous decision, 3–0

Invitation tournament (91 kg), Kitchener, Ontario, June 1982:

- Defeated D. Walls (Canada) by unanimous decision, 3–0

Invitation tournament (+91 kg), Brantford, Ontario, July 1982:

- Defeated J. Mathiasen (Canada) RSC 1

Invitation tournament (+91 kg), Sarnia, Ontario, July 1982:

- Defeated G. Lamblon (Canada) RSC 1

Invitation tournament (+91 kg), Sudbury, Ontario, July 1982:

- Defeated I. Lewis (Canada) RSC 1

Commonwealth Games Eliminator (+91 kg), Winnipeg, Manitoba, July 1982:

- Defeated Barry Forbes (Canada) by majority decision, 4–1

Invitation tournament (+91 kg), Toronto, Ontario, August 1982:

- Defeated I. Lewis (Canada) by unanimous decision, 3–0

Invitation tournament (+91 kg), Toronto, Ontario, September 1982:

- Defeated M. Rome (Canada) by unanimous decision, 3–0
- Defeated B. Allan (Canada) RSC 2

Invitation tournament (+91 kg), Toronto, Ontario, October 1982:

- Defeated J. Corrigan (Canada) RSCH 3

USA–Canada Duals (+91 kg), Chicago, Illinois, January 1983:

- Defeated J. Valleyfield (United States) by unanimous decision, 3–0

(gold) Canada Winter Games (+81 kg), Chicoutimi, Quebec, February 1983:

- Finals: Defeated Claude Courchesne (Canada) RSCH 1

Invitation tournament (+91 kg), Waterloo, Ontario, March 1983:

- Defeated B. Drift (Canada) by decision

Invitation tournament (+91 kg), Hamilton, Ontario, June 1983:

- Defeated Larry Evans (Canada) by decision

(gold) II Junior World Championships (+91 kg), Santo Domingo, Dominican Republic, June 1983:

- 1/4: Defeated Vincent Jones (United States) by unanimous decision, 5–0
- 1/2: Defeated Durin Răcaru (Romania) by unanimous decision, 5–0
- Finals: Defeated Pedro Quesada (Cuba) by walkover

Canada–Finland Junior Duals (+91 kg), Oulu, Finland, September 1983:

- Defeated Jouni Kopola (Finland) by walkover

Canada–Sweden Junior Duals (+91 kg), Uppsala, Sweden, September 1983:

- Defeated Tommy Börzsei (Sweden) RSC 3

Invitation tournament (+91 kg), Waterloo, Ontario, October 1983:

- Defeated Larry Evans (Canada) RSC 2

Stockholm Open Tournament (+91 kg), Stockholm, Sweden, January 1984:

- Defeated Bengt Cederquist (Sweden) by unanimous decision, 5–0

Invitation tournament (+91 kg), Waterloo, Ontario, January 1984:

- Defeated D. Mills (Canada) by unanimous decision, 3–0

USA–Canada Duals (+91 kg), Edmonton, Alberta, February 1984:

- Defeated Craig Payne (United States) by split decision, 2–1

Invitation tournament (+91 kg), Toronto, Ontario, February 1984:

- Defeated J. Singletary (Canada) RSC 2

(gold) Canadian Senior Championships (+91 kg), Trois Rivieres, Quebec, April 1984:

- 1/4: Defeated Don Stevenson (Canada) RSCH 1
- 1/2: Defeated Barry Forbes (Canada) by unanimous decision, 5–0
- Finals: Defeated Vernon Linklater (Canada) by unanimous decision, 5–0

Olympic Box-offs (+91 kg), Halifax, Nova Scotia, May 1984:

- Defeated Vernon Linklater (Canada) by walkover

XXIII Summer Olympics (+91 kg), Los Angeles, California, August 1984:

- 1/8: Defeated Mohammad Yousuf (Pakistan) RSCH 3 (1:17)
- 1/4: Lost to Tyrell Biggs (United States) by unanimous decision, 0–5

Britain–Canada Duals (+91 kg), Milton Keynes, England, October 1984:

- Defeated Robert Wells (England) KO 3

USA–Canada Duals (+91 kg), Orlando, Florida, December 1984:

- Defeated Nathaniel Fitch (United States) by unanimous decision, 3–0

(gold) Canadian Senior Championships (+91 kg), Medicine Hat, Alberta, March 1985:

- 1/4: Defeated Joe Stack (Canada) RET 1
- 1/2: Defeated J. Horton (Canada) RET 2
- Finals: Defeated Brian Lansing (Canada) RSCH 1

Invitation tournament (+91 kg), Kitchener, Ontario, April 1985:

- Defeated M. Jarvin (United States) RET 2

Invitation tournament (+91 kg), London, Ontario, May 1985:

- Defeated R. Garrison (United States) RSC 2

(gold) XI Albena Open Tournament (+91 kg), Albena, Bulgaria, June 1985:

- Finals: Defeated Milan Turek (Czech Republic) RET 1

(gold) North American Championships (+91 kg), Beaumont, Texas, August 1985:

- 1/2: Defeated Kimmuel Odum (United States) by decision
- Finals: Defeated Isaac Barrientos (Puerto Rico) by majority decision, 4–1

(silver) III World Cup (+91 kg), Seoul, South Korea, November 1985:

- 1/2: Defeated Juan Antonio Díaz Nieves (Argentina) RET 1
- Finals: Lost to Vyacheslav Yakovlev (Soviet Union) by unanimous decision, 0–5

Invitation tournament (+91 kg), Toronto, Ontario, January 1986:

- Defeated A. White (United States) by unanimous decision, 5–0

(gold) Canadian Senior Championships (+91 kg), Cornwall, Ontario, March 1986:

- 1/2: Defeated Sandy Hervieux (Canada) RET 2
- Finals: Defeated Wade Parsons (Canada) DQ 2 (for holding)

World Champ Box-Offs (+91 kg), Glace Bay, Nova Scotia, April 1986:

- Defeated Wade Parsons (Canada) by walkover

World Championships (+91 kg), Reno, Nevada, May 1986:

- 1/8: Lost to Petar Stoimenov (Bulgaria) by split decision, 2–3

Invitation tournament (+91 kg), Bay City, USA, July 1986:

- Lost to Jonathan Littles (United States) by split decision, 1–2
- Defeated J. Davidson (United States) RSC 2

XIII Commonwealth Games (+91 kg), Edinburgh, Scotland, July 1986:

- 1/2: Defeated James Oyebola (England) RSCH 2
- Finals: Defeated Aneurin Evans (Wales) RSC 2

TSC Tournament (+91 kg), East Berlin, East Germany, September 1986:

- 1/4: Lost to Valeriy Abadzhyan (Soviet Union) RSC 3
- 3rd place bouts: Lost to Ladislav Husarik (Czechoslovakia) by walkover

(gold) Quebec Cup (+91 kg), Montreal, Quebec, December 1986:

- Finals: Defeated Sandy Hervieux (Canada) RSC 2

(gold) Stockholm Open (+91 kg), Stockholm, Sweden, January 1987:

- 1/2: Defeated Håkan Brock (Sweden) by unanimous decision, 5–0
- Finals: Defeated Aleksander Burmistrov (Bulgaria) KO 3

(gold) Canadian Senior Championships (+91 kg), Oromocto, New Brunswick, April 1987:

- 1/2: Defeated Sandy Hervieux (Canada) by unanimous decision, 5–0
- Finals: Defeated K. Russell (Canada) RET 2

(gold) French Open (+91 kg), Saint-Nazaire, France, April 1987:

- Finals: Defeated István Szikora (Hungary) by unanimous decision, 5–0

Pan Am Box-Offs (+91 kg), Ottawa, Ontario, May 1987:

- Defeated Sandy Hervieux (Canada) RSC 1

(silver) Pan American Games (+91 kg), Indianapolis, Indiana, August 1987:

- 1/2: Defeated Carlos Barcelete (Brazil) KO 2
- Finals: Lost to Jorge Luis González (Cuba) by majority decision, 1–4 (both fighters had a point deducted in the 3rd rd for punching while holding)

(gold) North American Championships (+91 kg), Toronto, Ontario, August 1987:

- Finals: Defeated Jorge Luis González (Cuba) by split decision, 2–1 (González knocked down in the 3rd rd)

IV World Cup (+91 kg), Belgrade, Yugoslavia, October 1987:

- 1/4: Lost to Ulli Kaden (East Germany) by split decision, 2–3

(gold) Feliks Stamm Memorial (+91 kg), Warsaw, Poland, November 1987:

- 1/2: Defeated Nathaniel Fitch (United States) KO 2
- Finals: Defeated Marian Klepka (Poland) RET 2

(gold) Canadian Senior Championships (101 kg), Edmonton, Alberta, March 1988:

- Finals: Defeated Richard Ayotte (Canada) RET 1

(silver) Intercup (+91 kg), Karlsruhe, West Germany, April 1988:

- 1/4: Defeated Crispine Odera (Kenya) by unanimous decision, 5–0
- 1/2: Defeated Petar Stoimenov (Bulgaria) by split decision, 3–2
- Finals: Lost to Aleksandr Miroshnichenko (Soviet Union) by unanimous decision, 0–5

(gold) Canada Cup (+91 kg), Ottawa, Ontario, June 1988:

- Finals: Defeated Elton Wright (United States) RET 1 (1:08)

(gold) XXIV Summer Olympics (+91 kg), Seoul, South Korea, September–October 1988:

- 1/8: Defeated Crispine Odera (Kenya) RSCH 2 (2:59)
- 1/4: Defeated Ulli Kaden (East Germany) RSCH 1 (0:34)
- 1/2: Defeated Janusz Zarenkiewicz (Poland) by walkover
- Finals: Defeated Riddick Bowe (United States) RSC 2 (0:43)

== Honours ==
- Lennox Lewis, CM (1988–1998)
- Lennox Lewis, CM, MBE (1998–2002)
- Lennox Lewis, CBE, CM (2002–present)

== See also ==
- List of heavyweight boxing champions
- List of WBA world champions
- List of WBC world champions
- List of IBF world champions
- List of IBO world champions
- List of The Ring world champions
- List of British heavyweight boxing champions
- List of European Boxing Union heavyweight champions
- List of undisputed boxing champions
- List of Canadian sports personalities

== Notes ==
Sporting positions
Regional boxing titles
Preceded by Jean-Maurice Chanet	European heavyweight champion 31 October 1990 – October 1992; Vacated	Vacant Title next held by Henry Akinwande
Preceded by Gary Mason	British heavyweight champion 6 March 1991 – October 1992; Vacated	Vacant Title next held by Herbie Hide
Preceded by Derek Williams	Commonwealth heavyweight champion 30 April 1992 – March 1993; Vacated	Vacant Title next held by Henry Akinwande
Minor world boxing titles
Preceded by Tommy Morrison	IBC heavyweight champion 7 October 1995 – May 1996; Vacated	Vacant Title next held by Jerry Ballard
Vacant Title last held by Brian Nielsen	IBO heavyweight champion 13 November 1999 – 22 April 2001	Succeeded by Hasim Rahman
Preceded by Hasim Rahman	IBO heavyweight champion 17 November 2001 – 6 February 2004; Retired	Vacant Title next held by Wladimir Klitschko
Major world boxing titles
Vacant Title last held by Riddick Bowe	WBC heavyweight champion 14 December 1992 – 24 September 1994	Succeeded by Oliver McCall
Vacant Title last held by Mike Tyson	WBC heavyweight champion 7 February 1997 – 22 April 2001	Succeeded by Hasim Rahman
Preceded by Evander Holyfield	WBA heavyweight champion 13 November 1999 – 12 April 2000; Stripped	Succeeded by Evander Holyfield
Preceded by Evander Holyfield	IBF heavyweight champion 13 November 1999 – 22 April 2001	Succeeded by Hasim Rahman
Vacant Title last held by Riddick Bowe	Undisputed heavyweight champion 13 November 1999 – 12 April 2000; Titles fragmented	Vacant Title next held by Oleksandr Usyk
Preceded by Hasim Rahman	WBC heavyweight champion 17 November 2001 – 6 February 2004; Retired	Vacant Title next held by Vitali Klitschko
Preceded by Hasim Rahman	IBF heavyweight champion 17 November 2001 – 5 September 2002; Vacated	Vacant Title next held by Chris Byrd
Vacant Title last held by Mike Tyson	The Ring heavyweight champion 2 December 2001 – 6 February 2004; Retired	Vacant Title next held by Vitali Klitschko
Awards
Previous: Floyd Mayweather Jr.	The Ring Fighter of the Year; 1999	Next: Félix Trinidad
Previous: Michael Owen	BBC Sports Personality of the Year; 1999	Next: Steve Redgrave
Previous: Ben Tackie; KO10 Robert Garcia	The Ring Knockout of the Year; KO5 Hasim Rahman; 2001	Next: Rocky Juarez; KO10 Antonio Diaz
Previous: Ben Tackie; KO10 Robert Garcia	The Ring Knockout of the Year; KO8 Mike Tyson; 2002	Next: Rocky Juarez; KO10 Antonio Diaz
