= Lennox Lewis vs. Oliver McCall II =

Boxing competition

Payback or Playback
- Date: February 7, 1997
- Venue: Las Vegas Hilton, Paradise, Nevada, U.S.
- Title(s) on the line: WBC Heavyweight Championship

Tale of the tape
| Boxer | Lennox Lewis | Oliver McCall |
| Nickname | The Lion | The Atomic Bull |
| Hometown | London, London | Chicago, Illinois, U.S. |
| Pre-fight record | 29–1 (24 KO) | 28–6 (20 KO) |
| Age | 31 years, 5 months | 31 years, 9 months |
| Height | 6 ft 5 in (196 cm) | 6 ft 2 in (188 cm) |
| Weight | 251 lb (114 kg) | 237 lb (108 kg) |
| Style | Orthodox | Orthodox |
| Recognition | WBC; No. 1 Ranked Heavyweight | WBC; No. 2 Ranked Heavyweight |

Result
- Lewis wins via 5th-round TKO

Lennox Lewis vs. Oliver McCall II, billed as "Payback or Playback", was a professional boxing match contested on February 7, 1997, for the vacant WBC Heavyweight Championship.

== Background ==
Lewis and McCall had previously fought each other two and a half years earlier. At the time, Lewis was the undefeated WBC Heavyweight Champion and had successfully defended his title three times before being challenged by the virtually unknown number one contender Oliver McCall. After a close first round, McCall was able to catch Lewis with a short right hand that dropped Lewis to the canvas. Lewis was able to get back up, but was on wobbly knees. Deciding Lewis could not continue, referee Jose Guadalupe Garcia stopped the fight and awarded the victory to McCall by way of second-round technical knockout. Lewis called McCall's victory "lucky" and offered $10 million for a rematch, but McCall refused the offer claiming that Lewis had disrespected him with his post-fight comments and instead chose to make the first defense of his newly won title against 45–year old ex-heavyweight champ Larry Holmes. As a result, Lewis was forced to go down the comeback trail, defeating two little-known journeymen before facing former WBO Heavyweight Champions Tommy Morrison and Ray Mercer, defeating them by technical knockout and majority decision respectively.

Meanwhile, McCall successfully defended his WBC title against Holmes in a close unanimous decision victory. Following that victory, McCall was challenged by another British fighter in Frank Bruno. Bruno was able to build a big lead on the judges scorecards and withstood a late McCall rally to capture the WBC Heavyweight Championship. Bruno would then move on to defend his new title against the returning Mike Tyson, who stopped Bruno in three rounds to become the new WBC champion. After Tyson's victory over Bruno, Lewis became the WBC's number one contender and mandatory challenger to Tyson's title. After Tyson's and Lewis' respective teams were unable to come to a financial agreement, Don King paid Lewis $4 million to step aside and allow Tyson to challenge Bruce Seldon in a unification match for the WBA Heavyweight title. After Tyson defeated Seldon to capture the WBA title, he opted to face former undisputed champion Evander Holyfield instead of Lewis and officially vacated his WBC title. As such, the WBC scheduled a bout between their two top-ranked heavyweights, Lewis and McCall, to determine who would be the next WBC Heavyweight Champion. However, prior to the official announcement, McCall was arrested on charges of vandalism, disorderly conduct and resisting arrest and was subsequently sent back to rehab in hopes that he would kick his drug addiction. Though Lewis, his manager Frank Maloney and promoter Dino Duva expressed concern over McCall's antics, McCall's promoter Don King insisted that McCall would be ready by the time of the fight.

== The fight ==
Lewis was able to control the first three rounds with his strong left jab while also occasionally landing strong right hands. McCall, meanwhile, offered very little offense and only landed 26 punches through the course of the fight. After the third round ended, McCall refused to return to his corner, ignoring the pleas of his trainer George Benton and instead began walking around the ring until the fourth round began. As the fourth round began, Lewis landed a right hook to the side of McCall's head and followed with a right–left combination that just missed connecting. McCall then dropped his gloves and backed away from Lewis into the ropes. As Lewis approached him, McCall turned his back and began walking around the ring. Lewis attempted to provoke McCall into fighting several times, but McCall refused to fight back and spent the entire round walking around the ring and simply covering up when Lewis approached while also not landing a single punch. After the round ended McCall again refused to return to his corner and continued to walk around the ring. Eventually, referee Mills Lane took McCall, who was now crying, to his corner. Lane and McCall's corner questioned whether McCall wanted to continue to fight to which McCall responded that he did. However, as the fifth round began McCall continued not to fight back even as Lewis landed several power punches. As McCall again turned his back and began to walk away, Lane stepped in between the two fighters and stopped the fight, awarding Lewis the victory by technical knockout.

== Aftermath ==
The following day, McCall attempted to explain his bizarre actions at a news conference. He claimed that his refusal to engage Lewis was a type of rope-a-dope strategy and explained his crying by saying he had "wanted to get himself into an emotional state." Regardless, the Nevada Athletic Commission temporarily suspended McCall and withheld his $3 million purse and by early April, he was deemed mentally ill and was sent to a Virginia psychiatric ward. In September 1997, McCall was deemed healthy enough to continue boxing and his suspension was lifted. He was also finally able to collect his purse albeit with a $250,000 fine. He returned to the ring on November 4, 1997, with a victory over Brian Yates and capped off a 12-fight undefeated streak with a knockout win over heavyweight contender Henry Akinwande that made him the number four ranked heavyweight in the world. However, before he could further capitalize on his ranking, he was arrested and imprisoned for over a year, losing his ranking in the process. Lewis, meanwhile, would successfully defend his title nine consecutive times and would eventually unify the WBC title with the WBA and IBF titles by defeating Evander Holyfield to become the Undisputed Champion.

== Undercard ==
Confirmed bouts:

== Broadcasting ==
| Country | Broadcaster |
|---|---|
| United Kingdom | Sky Sports |
| United States | HBO |

| Preceded by vs. Ray Mercer | Lennox Lewis's bouts 7 February 1997 | Succeeded by vs. Henry Akinwande |
| Preceded by vs. James Stanton | Oliver McCall's bouts 7 February 1997 | Succeeded by vs. Brian Yates |
