= Gerald Nobles =

American boxer (born 1971)

Gerald Nobles
Profile
Born	4 January 1971
Age	55
Birthplace	Philadelphia, Pennsylvania, U.S.
Residence	Philadelphia, U.S.
Height	5' 11"
Nickname	The Jedi
Classification	Heavyweight
Stance	Orthodox
Promotion	Silverhawk Boxing
Manager	Jim Rider
Boxing Record
Fights	27
Wins (KOs)	26 (21)
Losses	1
Draws	0

Gerald Nobles (born January 4, 1971, in Philadelphia, Pennsylvania), is an American former professional boxer.

== Professional career ==
This Philadelphia fighter turned pro on October 6, 1995, with a first round technical knockout of Juan Carlos Antonio. His first nine wins were via knockout as well as fourteen of his first fifteen.

In 2001, Nobles won a unanimous 10 round decision against heavyweight Sedreck Fields. Two fights after that he took an eight round unanimous decision from Ron Guerrero in front of his hometown.

From there Nobles' biggest fight was against former World Heavyweight Champion Bruce Seldon. The fight was stopped in the ninth round with Nobles scoring a technical knockout victory after Seldon was thumbed in the eye. Seldon was winning the fight after eight rounds on two of the scorecards.

Nobles' only loss occurred on November 20, 2004, to future World Boxing Association heavyweight champion Nikolai Valuev. Nobles was disqualified in the fourth round for repeated low blows on Valuev. Nobles' team claims that Valuev wore his trunks high and that the referee disqualified Nobles unfairly.

Nobles fought twice more, winning both bouts by knockout, before retiring in 2007.

== Professional boxing record ==
26 Wins (21 knockouts, 5 decisions), 1 Loss (0 knockouts, 1 decision)
Result	Record	Opponent	Type	Round	Date	Location	Notes
Win	34-14-2	(United States) Andy Sample	TKO	1	12/01/2007	Tampa, Florida, United States	Referee stopped the bout at 1:52 of the first round.
Win	7-15-1	(United States) Wallace McDaniel	TKO	1	26/10/2006	North Charleston, South Carolina, United States	Referee stopped the bout at 2:58 of the first round.
Loss	38-0	(Russia) Nikolai Valuev	DQ	4	20/11/2004	Kempten, Bayern, Germany	WBA Intercontinental Heavyweight Title. Referee disqualified Nobles at 0:42 of the fourth round for low blows.
Win	11-9-1	(United States) Curtis Taylor	TKO	1	30/09/2004	North Charleston, South Carolina, United States	Referee stopped the bout at 1:21 of the first round.
Win	35-4	(United States) Bruce Seldon	TKO	9	15/05/2004	Las Vegas, Nevada, United States	Referee stopped the bout at 0:41 of the ninth round.
Win	16-6	(United States) Willie Williams	KO	1	17/04/2004	(New York (state)) New York City, United States	
Win	16-6-3	(United States) Ron Guerrero	UD	8	20/06/2003	Philadelphia, Pennsylvania, United States	
Win	18-24-1	(United States) Dennis McKinney	TKO	2	26/09/2002	North Charleston, South Carolina, United States	
Win	12-11	(United States) Sedreck Fields	UD	10	24/01/2001	Las Vegas, Nevada, United States	96-90, 96-90, 97-89.
Win	7-37-2	(United States) Caseny Truesdale	TKO	2	14/12/2000	Philadelphia, Pennsylvania, United States	
Win	8-9-3	(Mexico) Agustin Corpus	UD	8	07/10/2000	Uncasville, Connecticut, United States	
Win	14-19-4	(United States) John Kiser	UD	8	30/01/1999	Atlantic City, New Jersey, United States	
Win	2-8-1	(United States) Mitchell Rose	TKO	3	12/12/1998	Atlantic City, New Jersey, United States	
Win	10-3-1	(United States) Greg Pickrom	TKO	5	04/12/1997	(New York (state)) Albany, New York, United States	
Win	14-8-1	(United States) Samson Cohen	TKO	1	17/10/1997	Philadelphia, Pennsylvania, United States	
Win	6-13	(United States) Rick Sullivan	TKO	3	12/09/1997	Philadelphia, Pennsylvania, United States	
Win	9-33-2	(United States) Exum Speight	TKO	3	11/04/1997	Philadelphia, Pennsylvania, United States	
Win	7-10-1	(United States) Ron McCarthy	UD	6	22/02/1997	Atlantic City, New Jersey, United States	
Win	8-14	(United States) Lou Turchiarelli	TKO	1	07/01/1997	Philadelphia, Pennsylvania, United States	
Win	2-4	(United States) Earl Clark	TKO	3	06/12/1996	Philadelphia, Pennsylvania, United States	
Win	1-7-1	(United States) Dennis Cain	TKO	3	06/09/1996	Philadelphia, Pennsylvania, United States	
Win	7-7-2	(United States) Maurice Harris	KO	3	30/07/1996	Philadelphia, Pennsylvania, United States	Harris knocked out at 1:20 of the third round.
Win	8-23-1	(United States) Mike Robinson	TKO	2	19/04/1996	Philadelphia, Pennsylvania, United States	
Win	0-1	(United States) Antoine McMullen	KO	1	01/03/1996	Philadelphia, Pennsylvania, United States	
Win	--	(United States) Keith Kiblin	TKO	1	19/01/1996	Philadelphia, Pennsylvania, United States	
Win	--	(United States) Ben Feliciano	TKO	1	25/10/1995	Boston, Massachusetts, United States	
Win	--	(United States) Juan Carlos Antonio	TKO	1	06/10/1995	Philadelphia, Pennsylvania, United States	
