= Lennox Lewis vs. Frank Bruno =

1993 boxing competition

The Battle of Britain
- Date: 1 October 1993
- Venue: National Stadium, Cardiff, Wales, UK
- Title(s) on the line: WBC Heavyweight Championship

Tale of the tape
Boxer	Lennox Lewis	Frank Bruno
Nickname	The Lion	
Hometown	London, England	London, England
Purse	$8,000,000	$1,500,000
Pre-fight record	23–0 (19 KO)	36–3 (35 KO)
Age	28 years	31 years, 10 months
Height	6 ft 5 in (196 cm)	6 ft 3 in (191 cm)
Weight	229 lb (104 kg)	238 lb (108 kg)
Style	Orthodox	Orthodox
Recognition	WBC; Heavyweight Champion; The Ring; No. 2 Ranked Heavyweight	WBA/WBC/IBF; No. 5 Ranked Heavyweight; The Ring; No. 8 Ranked Heavyweight

Result
- Lewis wins via 7th-round TKO

Lennox Lewis vs. Frank Bruno, billed as The Battle of Britain, was a professional boxing match contested on 1 October 1993 at National Stadium, Cardiff in Wales. It was between WBC heavyweight champion Lennox Lewis, who was making the second defence of his title and Frank Bruno, who was fighting in his third world title bout, his two previous title fights having been unsuccessful. Lewis beat Bruno by a technical knockout in the seventh round.

== Background ==
Lennox Lewis had won the WBC heavyweight title when Riddick Bowe refused to fight him, so the WBC gave Lewis the title on 14 January 1993. Lewis had previously been the WBC's number one contender by defeating Razor Ruddock. Lewis then became the first British world heavyweight champion since Bob Fitzsimmons lost the title on 9 June 1899. Lewis went on to defend his title by defeating Tony Tucker.

Frank Bruno had previously lost to Tim Witherspoon on 19 July 1986 for the WBA heavyweight title at Wembley Stadium and to Mike Tyson on 25 February 1989 for the WBA, WBC, and IBF titles at the Las Vegas Hilton.

The fight was the first time that two British-born boxers had fought for the world heavyweight title, although Bruno had questioned how British Lewis really was, as he had won a gold medal for Canada at the 1988 Olympic Games as an amateur. Bruno described Lewis as "...not British", but said "It's about boxing. I'm sick and tired of his pretences. He calls himself champion. He acts like he's a Sugar Ray Leonard or a Willie Pep or a Joe Louis", and that "Nobody cares about Lennox Lewis in Britain."

To counter the Bruno claim that he was "not British", Lewis said, "What was I supposed to do? Not follow my mother to Canada?", "Look, I've fought more British fighters than that guy has. He makes a fool of himself, dressing up in girls' clothing on television". Lewis called Bruno an "Uncle Tom".

Bruno weighed in at 238 pounds (108 kg), and Lewis at 229 pounds (104 kg).

The fight was promoted by Frank Maloney Panix Promotions and by Main Events. It was a pay-per-view event with HBO in the United States and on Sky Sports in the United Kingdom.

== The fight ==
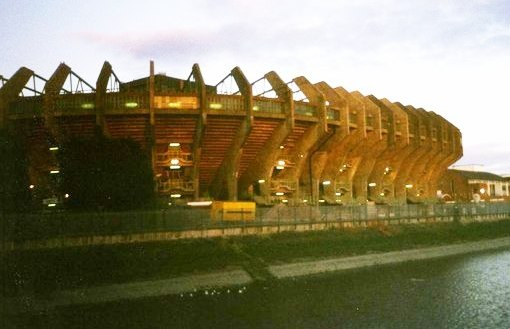
The National Stadium

The fight was staged at the now-demolished National Stadium, Cardiff Arms Park, which was used primarily as a rugby union stadium by the Welsh Rugby Union. In total 25,784 spectators watched the fight. The referee for the fight was Mickey Vann, from Britain, and the judges were Tony Castellano and Jerry Roth, both from the United States, and Adrian Morgan from Britain.

Bruno took the fight to Lewis, but Lewis won the first round. Bruno then went on the offensive and took the second round, with Lewis trying to use his left jab to win points. Bruno hit Lewis on the right of his head in the third round, which shook him. Lewis later said that "It didn't hurt me", but the punch concentrated Lewis's efforts on the job in hand. At the end of the sixth round, both Castellano and Roth had the fight level at 57–57, with Morgan scoring the fight 59–55 in favour of Bruno. At the start of the seventh round, Bruno hit Lewis with a left jab and continued with a series of short punches. Lewis said "He thought he had me... but actually I just lost my footing. I saw every punch coming". Lewis then hit Bruno with a looping left hook which staggered him, and continued with a series of head punches. Lewis said "I saw him drop his right hand and just came out with my left hook". In a momentary break during the onslaught, Lewis was warned by Vann for stiff-arming with his left hand. Upon resuming, Lewis finished off Bruno, who was by then on unsteady legs and completely unable to defend himself. Vann stopped the fight one minute and twelve seconds into the seventh round.

== Aftermath ==
Lewis said after the fight "Bruno did his homework and kept me from throwing my right hand early... but he must have forgotten I have a terrific left hook. I said to myself, 'I'm going to let him see my hook'". Bruno's manager, Mickey Duff, said "Frank (Bruno) has no chin... once he gets hit clean on the button, he goes".

== Undercard ==
Confirmed bouts: The undercard featured Joe Calzaghe, who made his first professional appearance in front of barely 300 spectators. Calzaghe would later become an undefeated world champion in two weight classes, and, along with Lewis, a member of the International Boxing Hall of Fame.

- Neil Haddock (Wales) beat John T Williams (Wales) by points in a 10-round contest
- Neil Swain (Wales) beat Rowan Williams (England) by points in a 6-round contest
- Joe Calzaghe (Wales) beat Paul Hanlon (England) by a technical knockout in round 1 of a 4-round contest
- Ross Hale (England) beat Carlos Chase (England) by a technical knockout in round 8

== Broadcasting ==
Country	Broadcaster
United Kingdom	Sky Sports
United States	HBO

== See also ==
- Sport in Cardiff
- Boxing in the 1990s

Preceded by vs. Tony Tucker	Lennox Lewis's bouts 1 October 1993	Succeeded by vs. Phil Jackson
Preceded by vs. Carl Williams	Frank Bruno's bouts 1 October 1993	Succeeded by vs. Jesse Ferguson
