= Derek Williams (boxer) =

English boxer

Personal information
- Nickname: Sweet D
- Nationality: English
- Born: Derek Williams; 11 March 1965 (age 61) Stockwell, London, England
- Height: 6 ft 5 in (196 cm)
- Weight: heavyweight

Boxing career
- Stance: Orthodox

Boxing record
- Total fights: 35
- Wins: 22 (KO 17)
- Losses: 13 (KO 3)

Derek Williams (born 11 March 1965) is an English professional heavyweight boxer of the 1980s and '90s who won the British Boxing Board of Control (BBBofC) British heavyweight title, Commonwealth heavyweight title, and European Boxing Union (EBU) heavyweight title, his professional fighting weight varied from 206 1/2 lb (93.7 kg; 14 st 10.5 lb), to 257 lb (117 kg; 18 st 5 lb), i.e. heavyweight.
