= Oliver McCall =

American boxer (born 1965)

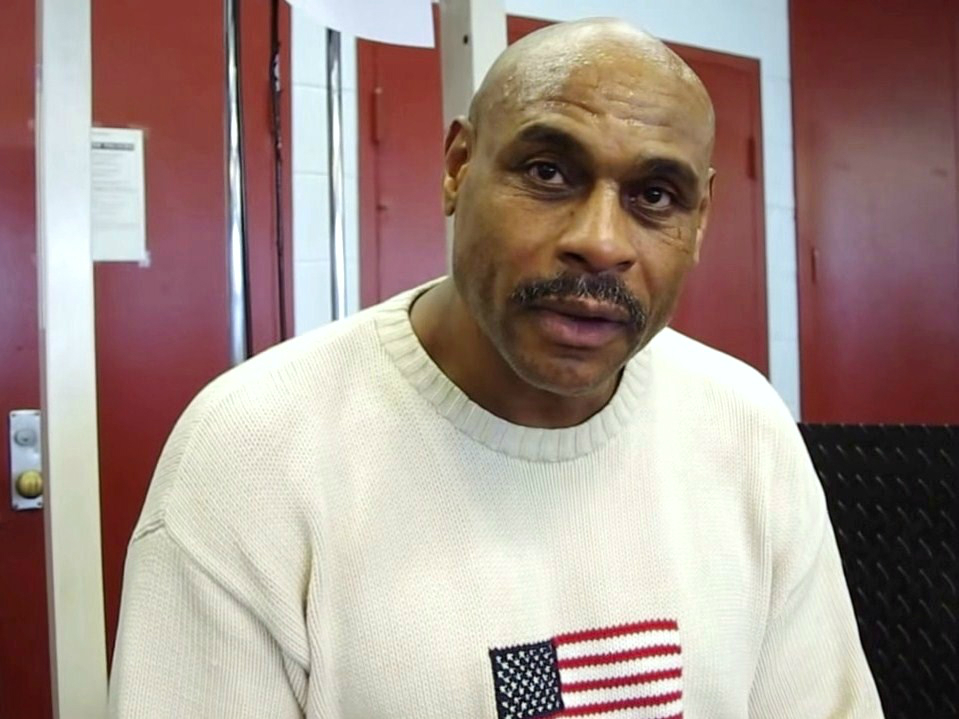
- McCall in 2013

Personal information
- Nickname: The Atomic Bull
- Born: April 21, 1965 (age 61) Chicago, Illinois, U.S.
- Height: 6 ft 2 in (188 cm)
- Weight: Heavyweight

Boxing career
- Reach: 82 in (208 cm)
- Stance: Orthodox

Boxing record
- Total fights: 79
- Wins: 62
- Win by KO: 41
- Losses: 14
- Draws: 1
- No contests: 2

Oliver McCall (born April 21, 1965) is an American professional boxer who began competing professionally in 1985. A veteran of the sport for over four decades, he is best known for winning the WBC heavyweight title in 1994 by scoring an upset knockout victory over Lennox Lewis. The next year he defended the title against Larry Holmes before losing it to Frank Bruno. McCall is known for an infamous in-ring mental breakdown during his 1997 rematch with Lewis. McCall's son, Elijah, is also a heavyweight professional boxer. McCall is famous for having never been knocked down in any of his 79 professional bouts.

== Early life ==
Born in Chicago, McCall moved to live with his mother in Racine, Wisconsin and attended William Horlick High School, before transferring to Washington Park High School. McCall was also a talented high school basketball player. In 1981, however, McCall moved back to Chicago where he pursued boxing and won two Chicago Golden Gloves titles.

Oliver McCall married Alethia McCall on December 18, 1984. They shared 7 children together: Tawanna, Shirley, Natasha, Elijah, Jeneva, Mikail, and Oliver jr.

== Amateur career ==
At the amateur ranks McCall competed in super heavyweight division (+201 lbs.)

=== Highlights ===
National Golden Gloves (super heavyweight), Statehouse Convention Center, Little Rock, Arkansas, March 1985:

- 1/16: Lost to Tevin George by decision

Chicago Championships (heavyweight), Clarendon Park, Chicago, Illinois, April 1985:

- 1/2: Defeated Roderick Wilbur by decision
- Finals: (no data available)

(gold) 5th Sarge Johnson Memorial Boxing Tournament (super heavyweight), Convention Center, Indianapolis, Indiana, July 1985:

- Defeated Larry Thomas RSC 1 (0:57)

== Professional career ==
Known as "The Atomic Bull", McCall turned pro in 1985 and slowly worked his way up the heavyweight ranks. His trainer at that time was the retired champion Joe Frazier. Oliver had a bit of trouble, losing his second bout and losing to Mike Hunter and Buster Douglas in 1988 and 1989 respectively. His eighth opponent was Al Evans, who scored a TKO victory over Mike Tyson in 1981, when Tyson was a 15 year old just beginning his amateur career. McCall won by a unanimous decision. Oliver beat Jesse Ferguson and future heavyweight champion Bruce Seldon. In 1992 Oliver lost a very close decision to Tony Tucker before landing the shot against Lewis in 1994.

=== Lewis vs McCall ===
After a close first round McCall came out aggressively in the second and landed his signature counter right hand as Lewis moved forward. Lewis dropped to the canvas and got up before the count of ten, but he was unsteady on his feet, forcing the referee to wave a stop to the fight. In spite of the Lewis camp protests, Boxing Monthly editor Glyn Leach pointed out that Lewis "only seemed to recover his senses once the fight was waved off," and that "in the opinions of everyone I spoke to at ringside, the decision was correct."

McCall's win over Lewis marked Don King's return to power in the heavyweight division, since none of his stable of fighters had been able to win the heavyweight title since Mike Tyson lost it in 1990 (McCall worked as a sparring partner with Tyson and Cooper, and claimed Cooper is the harder puncher.) He successfully defended the title in a bout against 45-year-old ex-champ Larry Holmes in Las Vegas winning 114–113, 115–114, and 115–112 on the score cards, before returning to London to face Frank Bruno in 1995.

During a press conference before the fight McCall claimed he was going to get revenge for America after Gerald McClellan had been rendered brain damaged after a fight with Nigel Benn a few months earlier. He had claimed that he was going to hurt Bruno and that the only thing Bruno would be able to do was throw illegal rabbit punches.

The fight took place at the old Wembley stadium. Bruno started off well, working behind the jab and landing some big right hands. McCall seemed uninterested in fighting and lagged far behind on the score cards going into the latter rounds. By round 9 Bruno had built up a big lead on the score cards and looked comfortably in charge. McCall finally sparked into life in round 10 perhaps realizing that he was behind on the score cards. McCall landed several big punches over the final 3 rounds and had Bruno in trouble several times but Bruno managed to hold on and win the title by a unanimous decision.

This gave McCall the distinction of becoming the first Heavyweight champion in history to both win the title from and lose the title to a British fighter, and also the first American Heavyweight champion to have both won and lost the title in Britain (and Europe).

McCall returned to the ring 6 months after losing his title when he beat future WBC heavyweight champion Oleg Maskaev in less than 3 minutes. By that time his trainers were Greg Page and George Benton. A month later after defeating Maskaev, McCall beat James Stanton in 6 rounds.

=== Lewis vs. McCall II ===
Lewis and McCall squared off again on February 7, 1997, in Las Vegas. In a bizarre fight, McCall refused to fight in the fourth and fifth rounds, beginning to cry and eventually forcing the referee to stop the fight and award Lewis the victory. The referee for the fight, Mills Lane, stated in an interview after the match, "In the third round, he got in close, and then seemed frustrated, and then he just backed off and put his arms down. . . . I thought he was playing possum but then I saw his lips started to quiver and I thought, 'My God, is he crying?'" Lane stopped the fight when McCall had refused to defend himself for several rounds.

=== Aiming for another shot at the title ===
In 2001 at the age of 36 he resurrected his career with a tenth-round knockout of Henry Akinwande, at the time one of the most avoided contenders in the world, on a Lennox Lewis undercard in Las Vegas. McCall was ranked number 4 in the world off this performance, but was arrested shortly afterwards and imprisoned for over a year, losing his ranking.

In December 2004 he lost a close points decision to fellow contender DaVarryl Williamson on a high-profile Don King undercard from New York, and in 2005 he traveled to Germany for an eliminator to skillful and well regarded Cuban Juan Carlos Gomez, and was outpointed over ten rounds. However this loss was removed from McCall's record as Gomez later failed a drug test.

Despite his legal troubles, McCall's career continued. He began his next run at a title with a first-round TKO of Kenny Craven in June 2006.

McCall defeated Darroll Wilson in a fourth-round TKO in Louisville, Kentucky, on September 9, 2006, for the WBC Fecarbox Championship.

On December 9, 2006, McCall defeated Yanqui Diaz via seventh-round KO in Hollywood, Florida.

On 16 June 2007, McCall defeated Sinan Samil Sam for the WBC International Heavyweight Championship by unanimous decision in Ankara, Turkey.

The long inactive McCall defeated Australian John Hopoate by 2nd-round TKO on the May 22, 2009, for the vacant IBA intercontinental heavyweight belt. McCall dominated the fight and knocked Hopoate down twice.

He defended his IBA continental belt against Franklin Lawrence by a ten-round unanimous decision on August 21, 2009, at the Orleans Hotel & Casino, Las Vegas.

On October 23, 2009, he defended his IBA continental title again by a ten-round unanimous decision against 6'8" Lance Whitaker.

McCall's next opponent was Timur Ibragimov. The two fought at the Seminole Hard Rock Hotel and Casino, Hollywood, Florida. Ibragimov was a fringe contender with a 27-2-1 record. McCall lost the bout by unanimous decision, with the scores of 117–111 twice and 119–109. It was his first loss since his comeback in 2009.

== Legal troubles ==
McCall's career has been mottled by several stints in drug rehabilitation facilities and arrests for disorderly behavior. He has attempted numerous comebacks, though the efforts have repeatedly been frustrated by run-ins with the law.

In January 2006 he was arrested by police in Nashville, Tennessee, who say they had to use a Taser on McCall after he tried running away from officers trying to arrest him for trespassing in a public housing development.

Police officers informed the media that McCall had in his possession a glass pipe and a five-dollar bill containing a small amount of cocaine. They further stated that the 40-year-old McCall later spat at an officer and threatened to kill him. He was held on $299,000 bond and charged with criminal trespass, resisting arrest, assaulting police officers, threatening to kill an officer, and being a fugitive from justice on charges in his home state of Virginia. He was released on May 8, 2006.

On the weekend before his scheduled fight with Zuri Lawrence at the Seminole Hard Rock Hotel & Casino in nearby Hollywood, Florida, McCall was arrested for possession of cocaine and drug paraphernalia in Fort Lauderdale, preventing him from fighting. He was ultimately sentenced to probation. McCall was able to get another big fight, this time against Fres Oquendo, scheduled for December 7, 2010. McCall won in a split decision over the favored Oquendo.

On December 9, 2010, two days after his latest victory, McCall was again arrested in Fort Lauderdale for possession of cannabis and violation of municipal ordinance, causing him to violate the terms of his probation stemming from the February cocaine charge. As a result of the probation violation, he was facing six years in Florida State Prison. The Law Office of Roger P. Foley, P.A. represented McCall and was able to have him reinstated on his previous probationary term, modified to include drug and psychological evaluation followed by any necessary treatment. On December 16, 2011, his probation was terminated.

== Professional boxing record ==
79 fights	62 wins	14 losses
By knockout	41	1
By decision	20	13
By disqualification	1	0
Draws	1	
No contests	2	

No.	Result	Record	Opponent	Type	Round, time	Date	Location	Notes
79	Win	62–14–1 (2)	Jeremiah Williams	TKO	5 (6), 2:52	Nov 3, 2026	Plaza Mariachi, Nashville, Tennessee, U.S.	
78	Draw	61–14–1 (2)	Carlos Reyes	SD	6	Jun 3, 2025	Texas Troubadour Theatre, Nashville, Tennessee, U.S.	
77	Win	61–14 (2)	Gary Cobia	RTD	1 (6), 3:00	Feb 4, 2025	Texas Troubadour Theatre, Nashville, Tennessee, U.S.	
76	Win	60–14 (2)	Stacy Frazier	TKO	2 (4), 2:45	Nov 19, 2024	Texas Troubadour Theatre, Nashville, Tennessee, U.S.	
75	Win	59–14 (2)	Hugo Lomeli	RTD	2 (8), 3:00	May 31, 2019	Centro de Convenciones Mundo Nuevo, Matamoros, Tamaulipas, Mexico	
74	Win	58–14 (2)	Larry Knight	UD	6	Nov 30, 2018	HEB Tennis Centre, Corpus Christi, Texas, U.S.	
73	Loss	57–14 (2)	Marcin Rekowski	UD	10	Apr 26, 2014	Arena Legionowo, Legionowo, Poland	
72	Win	57–13 (2)	Marcin Rekowski	SD	8	Feb 1, 2014	Hala Okrąglak, Opole, Poland	
71	Loss	56–13 (2)	Krzysztof Zimnoch	UD	8	May 18, 2013	Arena Legionowo, Legionowo, Poland	
70	Loss	56–12 (2)	Francesco Pianeta	UD	10	May 16, 2012	Brandenburg-Halle, Frankfurt, Germany	
69	Win	56–11 (2)	Damian Wills	UD	10	Aug 20, 2011	Athletic Fencing Center, Houston, Texas, U.S.	Won vacant WBF (Foundation) Intercontinental heavyweight title
68	Loss	55–11 (2)	Cedric Boswell	UD	10	Mar 18, 2011	Hard Rock Live, Hollywood, Florida, U.S.	For vacant WBA–NABA and WBC Latino heavyweight titles
67	Win	55–10 (2)	Fres Oquendo	SD	12	Dec 7, 2010	Hard Rock Live, Hollywood, Florida, U.S.	Won vacant IBF Inter-Continental heavyweight title
66	Loss	54–10 (2)	Timur Ibragimov	UD	12	Jun 15, 2010	Hard Rock Live, Hollywood, Florida, U.S.	For vacant WBA–NABA heavyweight title
65	Win	54–9 (2)	Lance Whitaker	UD	10	Oct 23, 2009	The Orleans, Paradise, Nevada, U.S.	
64	Win	53–9 (2)	Franklin Lawrence	UD	10	Aug 21, 2009	The Orleans, Paradise, Nevada, U.S.	
63	Win	52–9 (2)	John Hopoate	TKO	2 (10), 1:26	May 22, 2009	The Orleans, Paradise, Nevada, U.S.	
62	Loss	51–9 (2)	Juan Carlos Gómez	UD	12	Oct 19, 2007	Estrel Hotel, Berlin, Germany	Lost WBC International heavyweight title
61	Win	51–8 (2)	Sinan Şamil Sam	UD	12	Jun 16, 2007	Atatürk Sport Hall, Ankara, Turkey	Won WBC International heavyweight title
60	Win	50–8 (2)	Marion Wilson	UD	8	Feb 24, 2007	ABC Sports Complex, Springfield, Virginia, U.S.	
59	Win	49–8 (2)	Yanqui Díaz	KO	7 (10), 2:28	Dec 9, 2006	Hard Rock Live, Hollywood, Florida, U.S.	
58	Win	48–8 (2)	Darroll Wilson	TKO	4 (12), 0:40	Sep 3, 2006	Louisville Gardens, Louisville, Kentucky, U.S.	Won vacant WBC FECARBOX heavyweight title
57	Win	47–8 (2)	Kenny Craven	TKO	1 (10), 1:09	Jun 30, 2006	Hard Rock Live, Hollywood, Florida, U.S.	
56	Win	46–8 (2)	Wallace McDaniel	TKO	3 (8), 1:37	May 27, 2006	The Plex, North Charleston, South Carolina, U.S.	
55	NC	45–8 (2)	Juan Carlos Gómez	UD	10	Oct 15, 2005	Burg-Wächter Castello, Düsseldorf, Germany	Originally a UD win for Gómez, later ruled an NC after he failed a drug test
54	Win	45–8 (1)	Przemysław Saleta	TKO	4 (10), 2:40	Aug 13, 2005	United Center, Chicago, Illinois, U.S.	
53	Win	44–8 (1)	Kelvin Hale	UD	8	May 10, 2005	Kennel Club, Sarasota, Florida, U.S.	
52	Win	43–8 (1)	Cornelius Ellis	UD	8	Apr 16, 2005	M.C. Benton Jr. Convention Center, Winston-Salem, North Carolina, U.S.	
51	Win	42–8 (1)	Marion Wilson	DQ	6 (8)	Feb 5, 2005	Convention Center, Washington, D.C., U.S.	Wilson disqualified for repeated holding
50	Loss	41–8 (1)	DaVarryl Williamson	UD	10	Nov 13, 2004	Madison Square Garden, New York City, New York, U.S.	
49	Win	41–7 (1)	Vernon Woodward	TKO	3 (8), 1:26	Sep 25, 2004	Firelake Casino, Shawnee, Oklahoma, U.S.	
48	Win	40–7 (1)	Dennis McKinney	TKO	3 (10)	Apr 24, 2003	The Plex, North Charleston, South Carolina, U.S.	
47	Win	39–7 (1)	Henry Akinwande	KO	10 (10), 2:13	Nov 17, 2001	Mandalay Bay Events Center, Paradise, Nevada, U.S.	
46	Win	38–7 (1)	Matt Green	TKO	1 (10), 1:38	Sep 29, 2001	Martinsville, Virginia, U.S.	
45	Win	37–7 (1)	Sedreck Fields	SD	10	Aug 11, 2000	Paris Las Vegas, Paradise, Nevada, U.S.	
44	Win	36–7 (1)	Marcus McIntyre	KO	3 (10), 0:57	May 25, 2001	Grand Casino, Tunica, Mississippi, U.S.	
43	Win	35–7 (1)	Ric Lainhart	TKO	1 (10), 2:25	Feb 12, 2001	Jim Davidson Theatre, Pembroke Pines, Florida, U.S.	
42	Win	34–7 (1)	Will Hinton	TKO	1 (10), 1:17	Dec 18, 1999	Grand Casino, Tunica, Mississippi, U.S.	
41	NC	33–7 (1)	Samson Cohen	NC	2 (10)	Sep 25, 1999	High School, Bassett, Virginia, U.S.	Cohen unable to continue after falling out of the ring
40	Win	33–7	Samson Cohen	KO	1 (10)	Feb 24, 1998	Nashville, Tennessee, U.S.	
39	Win	32–7	Abdul Muhaymin	UD	10	Feb 3, 1998	Nashville, Tennessee, U.S.	
38	Win	31–7	Mike Acklie	KO	1 (10)	Jan 6, 1998	Nashville, Tennessee, U.S.	
37	Win	30–7	Mike DeVito	TKO	2 (8)	Dec 16, 1997	Music City Mix Factory, Nashville, Tennessee, U.S.	
36	Win	29–7	Brian Yates	TKO	8 (10)	Nov 4, 1997	Music City Mix Factory, Nashville, Tennessee, U.S.	
35	Loss	28–7	Lennox Lewis	TKO	5 (12), 0:55	Feb 7, 1997	Las Vegas Hilton, Winchester, Nevada, U.S.	For vacant WBC heavyweight title
34	Win	28–6	James Stanton	RTD	6 (10), 0:01	Mar 23, 1996	Miami Arena, Miami, Florida, U.S.	
33	Win	27–6	Oleg Maskaev	TKO	1 (10), 1:38	Feb 24, 1996	Coliseum, Richmond, Virginia, U.S.	
32	Loss	26–6	Frank Bruno	UD	12	Sep 2, 1995	Wembley Stadium, London, England	Lost WBC heavyweight title
31	Win	26–5	Larry Holmes	UD	12	Apr 8, 1995	Caesars Palace, Paradise, Nevada, U.S.	Retained WBC heavyweight title
30	Win	25–5	Lennox Lewis	TKO	2 (12), 0:31	Sep 24, 1994	Wembley Arena, London, England	Won WBC heavyweight title
29	Win	24–5	Dan Murphy	TKO	1 (10)	Feb 26, 1994	Earls Court Exhibition Centre, London, England	
28	Win	23–5	Art Card	KO	1 (10)	Dec 18, 1993	Estadio Cuauhtémoc, Puebla City, Mexico	
27	Win	22–5	Francesco Damiani	TKO	8 (10), 1:09	Apr 23, 1993	The Pyramid, Memphis, Tennessee, U.S.	
26	Win	21–5	Mike Dixon	TKO	2 (10), 2:48	Jan 30, 1993	The Pyramid, Memphis, Tennessee, U.S.	
25	Win	20–5	Lawrence Carter	KO	3 (10)	Jan 30, 1993	The Mirage, Paradise, Nevada, U.S.	
24	Loss	19–5	Tony Tucker	SD	12	Jun 26, 1992	CSU Convocation Center, Cleveland, Ohio, U.S.	For NABF heavyweight title
23	Win	19–4	Mike Rouse	TKO	4 (10), 2:54	Feb 15, 1992	The Mirage, Paradise, Nevada, U.S.	
22	Win	18–4	Jesse Ferguson	UD	10	Aug 8, 1991	Trump's Castle, Atlantic City, New Jersey, U.S.	
21	Win	17–4	Danny Wofford	TKO	5 (10)	Jun 8, 1991	Civic Center, Salem, Virginia, U.S.	
20	Win	16–4	Bruce Seldon	TKO	9 (10), 2:37	Apr 18, 1991	Etess Arena, Atlantic City, New Jersey, U.S.	
19	Loss	15–4	Orlin Norris	SD	10	Nov 17, 1990	Lee County Civic Center, Fort Myers, Florida, U.S.	
18	Win	15–3	Lionel Butler	SD	10	Jul 16, 1990	Central Plaza Hotel, Oklahoma City, Oklahoma, U.S.	
17	Loss	14–3	Buster Douglas	UD	10	Jul 21, 1989	Convention Hall, Atlantic City, New Jersey, U.S.	
16	Win	14–2	Bruce Johnson	KO	1 (10), 2:05	Oct 1, 1988	International Amphitheatre, Chicago, Illinois, U.S.	
15	Win	13–2	Wesley Smith	TKO	2 (8)	Sep 16, 1988	Winston-Salem, North Carolina, U.S.	
14	Win	12–2	David Jaco	UD	10	Jun 30, 1988	Pavilion Convention Center, Virginia Beach, Virginia, U.S.	
13	Loss	11–2	Mike Hunter	UD	6	Jan 22, 1988	Convention Hall, Atlantic City, New Jersey, U.S.	
12	Win	11–1	Kim Adams	TKO	2 (8), 0:51	Aug 30, 1987	Congress Plaza Hotel, Chicago, Illinois, U.S.	
11	Win	10–1	Richard Scott	KO	2 (8), 2:50	Aug 11, 1987	UIC Pavilion, Chicago, Illinois, U.S.	
10	Win	9–1	Tim Morrison	KO	1 (6), 1:01	May 30, 1987	DiVinci Manor, Chicago, Illinois, U.S.	
9	Win	8–1	Fred Whitaker	UD	6	Mar 21, 1987	DiVinci Manor, Chicago, Illinois, U.S.	
8	Win	7–1	Al Evans	UD	6	Dec 16, 1986	Condesa Del Mar, Alsip, Illinois, U.S.	
7	Win	6–1	Bashir Wadud	UD	6	Oct 25, 1986	DiVinci Manor, Chicago, Illinois, U.S.	
6	Win	5–1	Larry Roberson	TKO	1 (4), 2:31	Sep 13, 1986	DiVinci Manor, Chicago, Illinois, U.S.	
5	Win	4–1	James Churn	KO	1 (4), 1:19	Aug 14, 1986	Congress Plaza Hotel, Chicago, Illinois, U.S.	
4	Win	3–1	Kimmuel Odum	MD	4	Aug 14, 1986	DiVinci Manor, Chicago, Illinois, U.S.	
3	Win	2–1	Felix Shorter	TKO	2 (4)	Jan 18, 1986	DiVinci Manor, Chicago, Illinois, U.S.	
2	Loss	1–1	Joey Christjohn	UD	4	Dec 6, 1985	Las Vegas Hilton, Winchester, Nevada, U.S.	
1	Win	1–0	Lou Bailey	TKO	1 (4), 2:35	Nov 2, 1985	Odeum Expo Center, Villa Park, Illinois, U.S.	

Sporting positions
Regional boxing titles
Vacant Title last held by Calvin Brock	WBC FECARBOX heavyweight champion September 9, 2006 – April 2007; Vacated	Vacant Title next held by Carl Davis Drumond
Preceded by Sinan Şamil Sam	WBC International heavyweight champion June 16, 2007 – October 19, 2007	Succeeded by Juan Carlos Gómez
Vacant Title last held by Oleg Platov	IBF Inter-Continental heavyweight champion December 7, 2010 – March 2011; Vacated	Vacant Title next held by Konstantin Airich
Vacant Title last held by Amir Mansour	WBF (Foundation) Intercontinental heavyweight champion August 20, 2011 – May 2012; Vacated	Vacant Title next held by Skipp Scott
Major world boxing titles
Preceded by Lennox Lewis	WBC heavyweight champion September 24, 1994 – September 2, 1995	Succeeded by Frank Bruno
