= Bruce Seldon =

American boxer

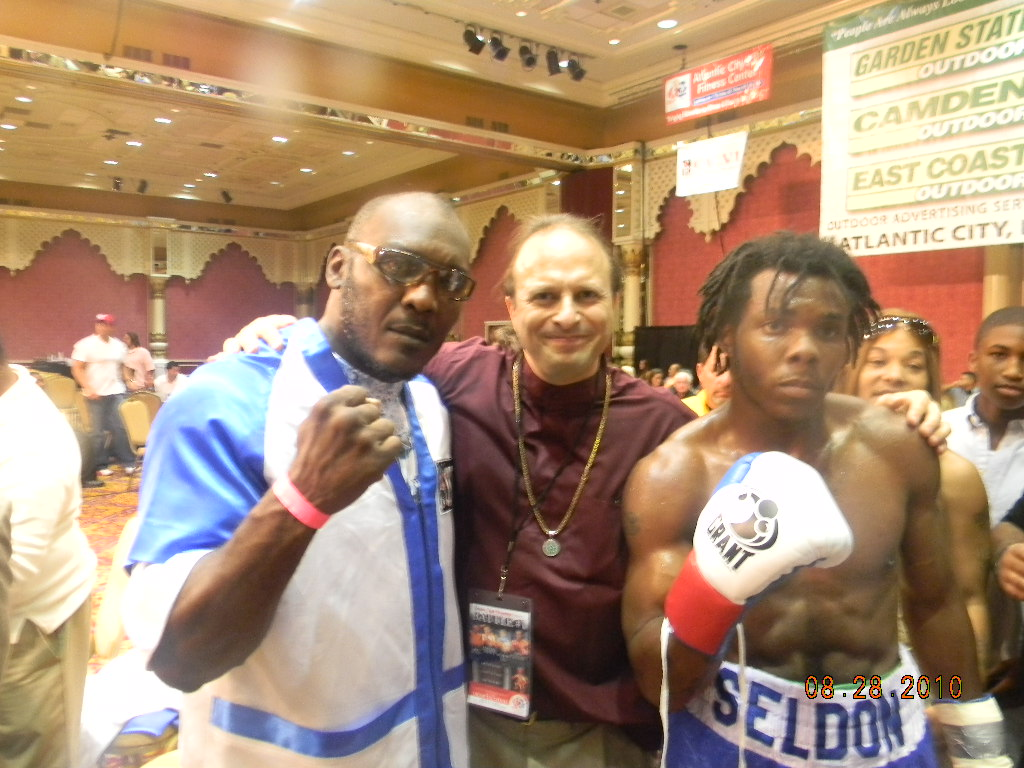
- Seldon (left) and son Isiah (right), 2010

Personal information
- Nickname: The Atlantic City Express
- Nationality: American
- Born: Bruce Samuel Seldon; January 30, 1967 (age 59) Atlantic City, New Jersey, U.S.
- Height: 6 ft 1 1/2 in (187 cm)
- Weight: Heavyweight

Boxing career
- Reach: 78 in (198 cm)
- Stance: Orthodox

Boxing record
- Total fights: 48
- Wins: 40
- Win by KO: 36
- Losses: 8

Bruce Samuel Seldon (born January 30, 1967) is an American boxing trainer and former professional boxer who fought between 1988 and 2009. He held the World Boxing Association (WBA) heavyweight world title for 17 months from April 1995 to September 1996.

== Amateur career ==
Seldon compiled an amateur record of 20 wins and 4 losses, and won the New Jersey Golden Gloves in the super heavyweight division.

== Professional career ==
Known as "The Atlantic City Express", Seldon began his career on October 4, 1988 with a first-round knockout of Joel McGraw and won his first 18 fights without a blemish. During his winning streak he defeated some notable boxers: Ezra Sellers (future world cruiserweight title challenger), Ossie Ocasio (former cruiserweight champion and heavyweight title challenger), David Bey (former world rated contender), and Jose Ribalta (former world title contender).

On April 18, 1991 future WBC heavyweight champion Oliver McCall handed Seldon his first defeat. Seldon was ahead on the scorecards but tired and was knocked down by McCall three times in the ninth. In his next fight Seldon was matched with future undisputed world heavyweight champion Riddick Bowe who defeated him.

Seldon returned in 1992 with a victory over Jesse Ferguson whom he stopped on an eye injury, but was knocked down and outpointed the same year by ex-champion Tony Tubbs. Seldon signed with promoter Don King in 1993 and boxed on a series of his undercards, most notably in August 1993 when he stopped ex-champion Greg Page in nine rounds.

=== WBA heavyweight champion ===
In 1995, world heavyweight champion George Foreman was stripped of the WBA title for declining to defend it against Tony Tucker. As Seldon was the second-ranked contender, a fight between him and Tucker was arranged for the vacant belt on April 8, 1995 in Las Vegas. Seldon, the underdog, used his jab to great effect and swelled Tucker's eye shut, to the point where the fight was stopped by the ringside doctor after seven rounds.

On August 18, 1995, Seldon fought on the undercard of the Mike Tyson-Peter McNeeley fight that marked Tyson's return to boxing. In the first defense of his title, Seldon again used his jab to control Joe Hipp and stop him in the tenth round.

=== Seldon vs Tyson ===
Seldon's next defense was scheduled against Tyson, who in early 1996 won the WBC title for a second time by knocking out Frank Bruno. The bout was originally to be a title unification fight, with both Seldon's WBA belt and Tyson's WBC belt at stake. However, the WBC mandated that Tyson defend his belt against former champion Lennox Lewis first. Since the fight with Seldon was already signed, Tyson vacated his belt and only Seldon's was on the line when the two fought on September 7, 1996.

The fight was marred by controversy as Seldon lost by knockout in the first round. His performance in the fight was vastly criticized, as he was knocked down twice on what appeared to be light or "phantom" punches from Tyson. Rumors started that Seldon had been paid to take a dive against Tyson, with the fans chanting "fix" following the decision. Although Seldon claimed in a post fight interview with Jim Gray that he did not take a dive, the criticism of his performance (including accusations that he took a dive) did not stop and Seldon elected to retire following the fight. Rapper Tupac Shakur attended the fight and was shot on the journey home, leading to his death six days later.

=== Legal problems after first retirement ===
In 1998, Seldon pleaded guilty to supplying a 15-year-old girl with marijuana and having unspecified sexual activity with her at his house in Camden, New Jersey. He was sentenced to 5 years' probation and 364 days in jail. "I'm terribly sorry for everything that happened", Seldon said. "I'm not a criminal. I'm not a bad person. I didn't mean for any of this to happen."

=== Comeback ===
Seldon attempted a comeback at age 37 in 2004. He defeated two journeymen before gaining a high-profile fight on HBO with Gerald Nobles. Abandoning his jab and boxing style for a punch out, Seldon decked Nobles in the second and was ahead on points but ended up throwing in the towel due to an eye injury in the ninth. In his next bout, an overweight Seldon was stopped in two rounds by Tye Fields. Seldon launched a second comeback in 2007, now into his 40s, and knocked out a series of journeymen before being knocked out himself by ranked contenders Kevin Johnson and Fres Oquendo. He was also KO'd in four during an exhibition with Alexander Povetkin.

== Professional boxing record ==
| 48 fights | 40 wins | 8 losses |
|---|---|---|
| By knockout | 36 | 7 |
| By decision | 4 | 1 |

| No. | Result | Record | Opponent | Type | Round, time | Date | Location | Notes |
|---|---|---|---|---|---|---|---|---|
| 48 | Loss | 40–8 | Fres Oquendo | KO | 9 (10), 2:35 | Jul 24, 2009 | UIC Pavilion, Chicago, Illinois, U.S. | For vacant WBA–NABA interim heavyweight title |
| 47 | Win | 40–7 | Gabe Brown | TKO | 5 (8) | May 15, 2009 | Broadway by the Bay, Atlantic City, New Jersey, U.S. | |
| 46 | Win | 39–7 | Brad Gregory | TKO | 2 (8), 2:01 | Nov 7, 2008 | Bally's, Atlantic City, New Jersey, U.S. | |
| 45 | Loss | 38–7 | Kevin Johnson | TKO | 5 (10), 0:28 | Sep 5, 2008 | Bally's, Atlantic City, New Jersey, U.S. | |
| 44 | Win | 38–6 | Livin Castillo | TKO | 5 (8), 0:57 | May 31, 2008 | Showboat, Atlantic City, New Jersey, U.S. | |
| 43 | Win | 37–6 | Jay Sweetman | KO | 2 (8), 1:56 | Mar 10, 2007 | Best Western Banquet Hall, Winchester, Virginia, U.S. | |
| 42 | Win | 36–6 | Marcus Rhode | TKO | 1 (6), 1:05 | Feb 10, 2007 | Klein Jewish Community Center, Philadelphia, Pennsylvania, U.S. | |
| 41 | Loss | 35–6 | Tye Fields | KO | 2 (10), 1:14 | Oct 28, 2005 | The Orleans, Paradise, Nevada, U.S. | |
| 40 | Loss | 35–5 | Gerald Nobles | TKO | 9 (10), 0:41 | May 15, 2004 | Mandalay Bay Events Center, Paradise, Nevada, U.S. | |
| 39 | Win | 35–4 | Lenzie Morgan | TKO | 2 (6) | Apr 9, 2004 | Drexel Armory, Philadelphia, Pennsylvania, U.S. | |
| 38 | Win | 34–4 | Otis Tisdale | KO | 3 (6), 3:00 | Mar 6, 2004 | The Blue Horizon, Philadelphia, Pennsylvania, U.S. | |
| 37 | Loss | 33–4 | Mike Tyson | TKO | 1 (12), 1:49 | Sep 7, 1996 | MGM Grand Garden Arena, Paradise, Nevada, U.S. | Lost WBA heavyweight title |
| 36 | Win | 33–3 | Joe Hipp | TKO | 10 (12), 1:47 | Aug 19, 1995 | MGM Grand Garden Arena, Paradise, Nevada, U.S. | Retained WBA heavyweight title |
| 35 | Win | 32–3 | Tony Tucker | RTD | 7 (12), 3:00 | Apr 8, 1995 | Caesars Palace, Paradise, Nevada, U.S. | Won vacant WBA heavyweight title |
| 34 | Win | 31–3 | Bill Corrigan | KO | 1 | Dec 17, 1994 | Coliseo General Rumiñahui, Quito, Ecuador | |
| 33 | Win | 30–3 | Tui Toia | TKO | 3 (10) | Jul 2, 1994 | The Mirage, Paradise, Nevada, U.S. | |
| 32 | Win | 29–3 | Nathaniel Fitch | TKO | 4 (12) | Feb 19, 1994 | Coliseum, Charlotte, North Carolina, U.S. | Retained IBF Inter-Continental heavyweight title |
| 31 | Win | 28–3 | Greg Page | TKO | 9 (12), 0:49 | Aug 6, 1993 | Coliseo Rubén Rodríguez, Bayamon, Puerto Rico | Retained IBF Inter-Continental heavyweight title |
| 30 | Win | 27–3 | Mike Robinson | KO | 2 | Apr 17, 1993 | Fernwood Resort, Bushkill, Pennsylvania, U.S. | |
| 29 | Win | 26–3 | Al Shoffner | TKO | 7 | Feb 15, 1993 | McGonigle Hall, Philadelphia, Pennsylvania, U.S. | |
| 28 | Win | 25–3 | Alexander Popov | TKO | 2 (12), 3:00 | Jan 24, 1993 | Etess Arena, Atlantic City, New Jersey, U.S. | Retained IBF Inter-Continental heavyweight title |
| 27 | Loss | 24–3 | Tony Tubbs | UD | 10 | Oct 14, 1992 | Broadway by the Bay, Atlantic City, New Jersey, U.S. | |
| 26 | Win | 24–2 | Percell Davis | TKO | 3, 2:38 | Sep 18, 1992 | Fernwood Resort, Bushkill, Pennsylvania, U.S. | |
| 25 | Win | 23–2 | Mike Dixon | UD | 10 | Jul 9, 1992 | Broadway by the Bay, Atlantic City, New Jersey, U.S. | |
| 24 | Win | 22–2 | Larry Givens | TKO | 2 | Jun 22, 1992 | Greensburg, Indiana, U.S. | |
| 23 | Win | 21–2 | Jimmy Taylor | TKO | 1 | Apr 16, 1992 | Central Plaza Hotel, Oklahoma City, Oklahoma, U.S. | |
| 22 | Win | 20–2 | Dion Burgess | TKO | 1 | Feb 9, 1992 | Broadway by the Bay, Atlantic City, New Jersey, U.S. | |
| 21 | Win | 19–2 | Jesse Ferguson | RTD | 5 (15), 3:00 | Jan 19, 1992 | Etess Arena, Atlantic City, New Jersey, U.S. | Won vacant IBF Inter-Continental heavyweight title |
| 20 | Loss | 18–2 | Riddick Bowe | KO | 1 (10), 1:48 | Aug 9, 1991 | Convention Hall, Atlantic City, New Jersey, U.S. | |
| 19 | Loss | 18–1 | Oliver McCall | TKO | 9 (10), 2:37 | Apr 18, 1991 | Etess Arena, Atlantic City, New Jersey, U.S. | |
| 18 | Win | 18–0 | Percell Davis | TKO | 1 (10), 1:07 | Mar 22, 1991 | Trump's Castle, Atlantic City, New Jersey, U.S. | |
| 17 | Win | 17–0 | Jose Ribalta | RTD | 3 (10), 3:00 | Jan 11, 1991 | Etess Arena, Atlantic City, New Jersey, U.S. | |
| 16 | Win | 16–0 | David Bey | TKO | 10 (10), 0:38 | Nov 1, 1990 | Etess Arena, Atlantic City, New Jersey, U.S. | |
| 15 | Win | 15–0 | John Morton | TKO | 7, 1:44 | Aug 16, 1990 | Sheraton Hotel, Boston, Massachusetts, U.S. | |
| 14 | Win | 14–0 | Tom Sandner | RTD | 2 (8), 3:00 | Jun 24, 1990 | Convention Hall, Atlantic City, New Jersey, U.S. | |
| 13 | Win | 13–0 | Ossie Ocasio | UD | 8 | May 18, 1990 | San Jose, California, U.S. | |
| 12 | Win | 12–0 | Danny Wofford | UD | 6 | Apr 7, 1990 | Flea Market, Miami Beach, Florida, U.S. | |
| 11 | Win | 11–0 | Jerry Jones | TKO | 8 (8), 0:42 | Mar 23, 1990 | Showboat, Atlantic City, New Jersey, U.S. | |
| 10 | Win | 10–0 | Amos Lisboa-Casillas | KO | 1 (4), 0:45 | Feb 18, 1990 | Steel Pier, Atlantic City, New Jersey, U.S. | |
| 9 | Win | 9–0 | Lorenzo Canady | RTD | 2, 3:00 | Jan 15, 1990 | Convention Hall, Atlantic City, New Jersey, U.S. | |
| 8 | Win | 8–0 | Hassan Shabazz | TKO | 5 (6), 0:08 | Nov 28, 1989 | Alumni Arena, Buffalo, New York, U.S. | |
| 7 | Win | 7–0 | Isaac Poole | KO | 1 (4) | Sep 15, 1989 | Jai-Alai Fronton, Miami, Florida, U.S. | |
| 6 | Win | 6–0 | Ezra Sellers | TKO | 2 (4) | Aug 22, 1989 | Showboat, Atlantic City, New Jersey, U.S. | |
| 5 | Win | 5–0 | Warren Thompson | TKO | 3 (4) | Jun 25, 1989 | Convention Hall, Atlantic City, New Jersey, U.S. | |
| 4 | Win | 4–0 | Jesse McGhee | UD | 4 | May 30, 1989 | Trump's Castle, Atlantic City, New Jersey, U.S. | |
| 3 | Win | 3–0 | Mike Robinson | TKO | 3 (4) | Mar 21, 1989 | Trump's Castle, Atlantic City, New Jersey, U.S. | |
| 2 | Win | 2–0 | Tyrone Barwell | KO | 1 (4), 1:34 | Nov 23, 1988 | Convention Hall, Philadelphia, Pennsylvania, U.S. | |
| 1 | Win | 1–0 | Joel McGraw | TKO | 1 (4) | Oct 4, 1988 | Atlantis Hotel and Casino, Atlantic City, New Jersey, U.S. | |

Sporting positions
Regional boxing titles
| Vacant Title last held by Mike Ronay Evans | IBF Inter-Continental heavyweight champion January 19, 1992 – April 1995; Vacated | Vacant Title next held by Obed Sullivan |
World boxing titles
| Vacant Title last held by George Foreman | WBA heavyweight champion April 8, 1995 – September 7, 1996 | Succeeded by Mike Tyson |
