= Boxing Monthly =

- Categories: Sport
- Frequency: Monthly
- Founded: 1989
- Final issue: May 2020
- Company: Kelsey Media
- Country: United Kingdom
- Based in: Cudham
- Language: English
- Website: www.boxingmonthly.com
- ISSN: 0956-098X

Boxing Monthly was a London-based, worldwide monthly boxing magazine.

== History and profile ==
Boxing Monthly was founded in May 1989. The monthly periodical was mainly feature-based, with a focus on UK and international fighters. It included expert columns, analysis, extensive reports from around the world, British and World Ratings and book reviews.

Barry J. Hugman was the launch editor in April 1989. He was followed by Ian Probert and George Zeleny. Glyn Leach became assistant editor in 1990 and editor in 1992 until his death in 2014. The title was launched alongside Boxing Weekly, which was seen as a direct competitor to Britain's other weekly boxing paper, Boxing News. Boxing Weekly proved unsuccessful and folded inside a year. The monthly magazine proved more popular, with a readership of approximately 25,000. International Boxing Hall of Fame inductee Graham Houston was its editor at the time it ceased publication, having taken over duties upon Leach's death.

It was announced in March 2020 that the May 2020 issue would be the last, thus ending the publication after 31 years.
