= 2019–20 II liga =

II liga
- Season: 2019–20
- Dates: 27 July 2019 – 25 July 2020
- Champions: Górnik Łęczna
- Promoted: Górnik Łęczna; Widzew Łódź; Resovia Rzeszów
- Relegated: Stal Stalowa Wola; Elana Toruń; Legionovia Legionowo; Gryf Wejherowo
- Matches played: 306
- Goals scored: 870 (2.84 per match)
- Top goalscorer: Michał Bednarski (24 goals)
- Biggest home win: Skra 7–0 Gryf (27 June 2020)
- Biggest away win: Znicz 0–6 Widzew (10 November 2019)
- Highest scoring: Widzew 7–3 Pogoń (12 October 2019)
- Longest winning run: 5 matches Górnik Łęczna (two times); GKS Katowice
- Longest unbeaten run: 12 matches Lech Poznań II
- Longest winless run: 12 matches Gryf Wejherowo
- Longest losing run: 10 matches Legionovia Legionowo; Gryf Wejherowo
- Highest attendance: 17,435; Widzew 2–0 Błękitni (9 August 2019)
- Lowest attendance: 0 (Note: Match have been played behind closed doors without any spectators.); Gryf 2–1 Skra (28 September 2019) and 52 matches due to the COVID-19 pandemic (Note: One match of 22 round, all matches of 23–26 round, three matches of 27 round, three matches of 28 round, one match of 29 round, two matches of 30 round, one match of 31 round, two matches of 32 round, one match of 33 round and two matches of 34 round have been played behind closed doors without any spectators.)
- Total attendance: 380,690 (Note: Selected matches of 27–34 round have been played with "no more than 25 percent of the number of seats allocated to the public".)
- Average attendance: Before COVID-19 pandemic: 1,706 (Note: The average league attendance was 1,706 after 197 matches prior to fixtures being played behind closed doors without any spectators.) ▼ Season average attendance: 1,244 ▼

The 2019–20 II liga was the 72nd season of the third tier domestic division in the Polish football league system since its establishment in 1948 and the 12th season of the Polish II liga under its current title. The league was operated by the PZPN. The league was contested by 18 teams. The regular season was played in a round-robin tournament. The season started on 27 July 2019 and concluded on 25 July 2020 (regular season). On 13 March 2020, the PZPN suspended the league due to the outbreak of COVID-19 pandemic. After consultation with the Polish government, the league resumed behind closed doors without any spectators on 3 June 2020.

== Changes from last season ==
The following teams have changed division since the 2018–19 season.

=== To II liga ===
Relegated from 2018–19 I liga

- Bytovia Bytów
- GKS Katowice
- Garbarnia Kraków

Promoted from 2018–19 III liga

- Legionovia Legionowo (Group 1)
- Lech Poznań II (Group 2)
- Górnik Polkowice (Group 3)
- Stal Rzeszów (Group 4)

=== From II liga ===
Promoted to 2019–20 I liga

- Radomiak Radom
- Olimpia Grudziądz
- GKS Bełchatów

Relegated to 2019–20 III liga

- Siarka Tarnobrzeg
- ROW 1964 Rybnik
- Rozwój Katowice
- Ruch Chorzów

== Team overview ==
=== Stadiums and locations ===
Location of teams and stadiums in 2019–20 II liga.

Team	Location	Stadium	Capacity
Błękitni Stargard	Stargard	Stadion Miejski	2,850
Bytovia Bytów	Bytów	Stadion Miejski	2,043
Elana Toruń	Toruń	Stadion im. Grzegorza Duneckiego	6,000
Garbarnia Kraków	Kraków	Stadion Garbarni	5,000
GKS Katowice	Katowice	Stadion GKS Katowice	6,710
Górnik Łęczna	Łęczna	Stadion Górnika Łęczna	7,456
Górnik Polkowice	Polkowice	Stadion Miejski	4,365
Gryf Wejherowo	Wejherowo	Stadion Miejski	2,500
Lech Poznań II	Poznań	Stadion Amiki Wronki	5,296
Legionovia Legionowo	Legionowo	Stadion Miejski	1,730
Olimpia Elbląg	Elbląg	Stadion Miejski	7,000
Pogoń Siedlce	Siedlce	Stadion Miejski	2,901
Resovia Rzeszów	Rzeszów	Stadion Resovii	3,420
Skra Częstochowa	Częstochowa	Stolzle Stadion STO	990
Stal Rzeszów	Rzeszów	Stadion Miejski	11,547
Stal Stalowa Wola	Boguchwała (Note: Until the matchday 20.)	Izo Arena	943
Stal Stalowa Wola	Stalowa Wola (Note: From the matchday 21.)	Podkarpackie Centrum Piłki Nożnej	3,764
Widzew Łódź	Łódź	Stadion Widzewa	18,018
Znicz Pruszków	Pruszków	Stadion Znicza	1,977

== Effects of the COVID-19 pandemic ==
II liga schedule changes
Round	Original dates	Revised dates
23	14–15 March	3 June (midweek)
24	21–22 March	6–7 June
25	28–29 March	13–14 June
26	4–5 April	17–18 June
27	11 April	20–21 June
28	18–19 April	27–28 June
29	25–26 April	1 July (midweek)
30	2–3 May	4–5 July
31	9–10 May	11–12 July
32	16–17 May	16 July (midweek)
33	23–24 May	19 July
34	30–31 May	25–26 July

== League table ==
Pos	Team	Pld	W	D	L	GF	GA	GD	Pts	Promotion or Relegation
1	Górnik Łęczna (C, P)	34	18	9	7	47	37	+10	63	Promotion to I liga
2	Widzew Łódź (P)	34	17	8	9	65	37	+28	59	Promotion to I liga
3	GKS Katowice	34	17	8	9	57	40	+17	59	Qualification for Promotion play-offs
4	Bytovia Bytów	34	14	10	10	50	48	+2	52 (Note: Head-to-head points: Bytovia Bytów 4, Resovia Rzeszów 1)	Qualification for Promotion play-offs
5	Resovia Rzeszów (P)	34	13	13	8	50	32	+18	52	Qualification for Promotion play-offs
6	Stal Rzeszów	34	15	6	13	55	44	+11	51	Qualification for Promotion play-offs
7	Garbarnia Kraków	34	14	8	12	46	40	+6	50 (Note: Head-to-head points: Garbarnia Kraków 4, Olimpia Elbląg 1)	
8	Olimpia Elbląg	34	13	11	10	46	38	+8	50	
9	Znicz Pruszków	34	15	4	15	49	52	−3	49 (Note: Head-to-head points: Znicz Pruszków 6, Pogoń Siedlce 0)	
10	Pogoń Siedlce	34	15	4	15	54	53	+1	49	
11	Górnik Polkowice	34	13	9	12	60	47	+13	48	
12	Błękitni Stargard	34	14	5	15	54	53	+1	47 (Note: Head-to-head points (goal difference): Błękitni Stargard 7 (+4), Lech Poznań II 5 (-1), Skra Częstochowa 4 (-4))	
13	Lech Poznań II	34	12	11	11	49	47	+2	47	
14	Skra Częstochowa	34	13	8	13	37	44	−7	47	
15	Stal Stalowa Wola (R)	34	13	7	14	45	49	−4	46	Relegation to III liga
16	Elana Toruń (R)	34	11	8	15	50	54	−4	41	Relegation to III liga
17	Legionovia Legionowo (R)	34	6	6	22	33	64	−31	24	Relegation to III liga
18	Gryf Wejherowo (R)	34	3	5	26	23	91	−68	14	Relegation to III liga

Source: Soccerway, 90minut.pl
Rules for classification: 1) Points; 2) Head-to-head points; 3) Head-to-head goal difference; 4) Head-to-head away goals scored (only if two teams); 5) Goal difference; 6) Goals scored; 7) fairplay ranking.
(C) Champions; (P) Promoted; (R) Relegated

== Promotion play-offs ==
II liga play-offs for the 2019–20 season will be played in July 2020. The teams who finished in 3rd, 4th, 5th and 6th place are set to compete. The fixtures are determined by final league position – 3rd team of regular season vs 6th team of regular season and 4th team of regular season vs 5th team of regular season. The winner of final match will be promoted to I liga for next season. All matches will be played in a stadiums of team which occupied higher position in regular season.

Semi-finals; 28 July
3	GKS Katowice	0
6	Stal Rzeszów	2
4	Bytovia Bytów	1 (6)
5	Resovia Rzeszów	1 (7)

Final; 31 July
6	Stal Rzeszów	0 (6)
5	Resovia Rzeszów	0 (7)

28 July 2020
17:30 CEST

Bytovia Bytów	1–1	Resovia Rzeszów
Feruga 107'	Report	Radulj 95' (pen.)
Penalties
Czubak (penalty scored); Deleu (penalty scored); Zawistowski (penalty scored); Ameyaw (penalty missed); Feruga (penalty scored); Giel (penalty scored); Rutkowski (penalty scored); Kwiatkowski (penalty missed)	6–7	Kubowicz (penalty scored); Zalepa (penalty scored); Radulj (penalty missed); Dziubinski (penalty scored); Platek (penalty scored); Adamski (penalty scored); Feret (penalty scored); Twardowski (penalty scored)

Municipal Stadium, Bytów
Attendance: 500 (Note: Match have been played with "no more than 25 percent of the number of seats allocated to the public" due to the COVID-19 pandemic.)
Referee: Paweł Malec (Łódź)
28 July 2020
20:25 CEST

GKS Katowice	0–2	Stal Rzeszów
	Report	Gałecki 31' (o.g.); Sylwestrzak 62'

Stadion GKS Katowice, Katowice
Attendance: 1,660
Referee: Jacek Małyszek (Lublin)

31 July 2020
17:00 CEST

Resovia Rzeszów	0–0	Stal Rzeszów
	Report
Penalties
Kubowicz (penalty scored); Geniec (penalty scored); Krykun (penalty scored); Dziubiński (penalty scored); Radulj (penalty scored); Twardowski (penalty scored); Płatek (penalty scored)	7–6	Kotwica (penalty scored); Reiman (penalty scored); Sylwestrzak (penalty scored); Głowacki (penalty scored); Pieczara (penalty scored); Kostkowski (penalty scored); Kłos (penalty missed)

Stadion Resovii, Rzeszów
Attendance: 712
Referee: Sebastian Krasny (Kraków)

== See also ==
- 2019–20 Ekstraklasa
- 2019–20 I liga
- 2019–20 III liga
- 2019–20 Polish Cup
