= Matches of Polish men's volleyball national team conducted by Andrea Anastasi =

List matches of Polish men's volleyball national team conducted by Andrea Anastasi, who was a coach of Polish national team from February 23, 2011 to October 24, 2013.

Overall
Victories	Defeats
54	38

== Achievements ==
No.		Tournament	Place	Date	Final opponent	Result	Won/Lost
1.	Bronze medal	FIVB World League	Poland	10 July 2011	Argentina	3–0 (25:18, 25:23, 25:22)	3/2
2.	Bronze medal	CEV European Championship	(Czech Republic) Czech Rep.& Austria	18 September 2011	Russia	3–1 (25:23, 18:25, 25:21, 25:19)	4/3
3.	Silver medal	FIVB World Cup	Japan	20 Nov–4 Dec 2011	–	–	8/3
4.	Gold medal	FIVB World League	Bulgaria	8 July 2012	United States	3–0 (25:17, 26:24, 25:20)	4/0
5.	5th	Olympic Games	United Kingdom	29 Jul–8 Aug 2012	–	–	3/3
6.	11th	FIVB World League	Intercontinental round	7 Jun–13 Jul 2013	–	–	4/6
7.	9th	CEV European Championship	Denmark & Poland	20–24 Sep 2013	–	–	2/2

== Official matches ==
=== 2011 FIVB World League ===
==== Pool A ====
May 27, 2011; 20:40	Poland	3–0	United States	(Poland) Atlas Arena, Łódź; Attendance: 8,100; Referees: I. AL NAAMA (QAT) - A. AZEVEDO (POR)
May 27, 2011; 20:40	(25–20, 25–22, 25–19)			(Poland) Atlas Arena, Łódź; Attendance: 8,100; Referees: I. AL NAAMA (QAT) - A. AZEVEDO (POR)

May 28, 2011; 17:10	Poland	0–3	United States	(Poland) Atlas Arena, Łódź; Attendance: 9,178; Referees: A. AZEVEDO (POR) - I. AL NAAMA (QAT)
May 28, 2011; 17:10	(22–25, 19–25, 35–37)			(Poland) Atlas Arena, Łódź; Attendance: 9,178; Referees: A. AZEVEDO (POR) - I. AL NAAMA (QAT)

June 4, 2011; 10:10	Brazil	3–0	Poland	(Brazil) Maracanazinho, Rio de Janeiro; Attendance: 9,524; Referees: P. VEREECKE (FRA) - D. CESPEDES LASSI (DOM)
June 4, 2011; 10:10	(25–23, 26–24, 25–21)			(Brazil) Maracanazinho, Rio de Janeiro; Attendance: 9,524; Referees: P. VEREECKE (FRA) - D. CESPEDES LASSI (DOM)

June 5, 2011; 10:10	Brazil	3–1	Poland	(Brazil) Maracanazinho, Rio de Janeiro; Attendance: 9,988; Referees: D. CESPEDES LASSI (DOM) - P. VEREECKE (FRA)
June 5, 2011; 10:10	(28–26, 23–25, 26–24, 25–23)			(Brazil) Maracanazinho, Rio de Janeiro; Attendance: 9,988; Referees: D. CESPEDES LASSI (DOM) - P. VEREECKE (FRA)

June 10, 2011; 20:40	Puerto Rico	0–3	Poland	(Puerto Rico) Roberto Clemente Coliseum, San Juan; Attendance: 4,132; Referees: S. KOSHIBA (JPN) - R. BARNSTORF (GER)
June 10, 2011; 20:40	(21–25, 23–25, 14–25)			(Puerto Rico) Roberto Clemente Coliseum, San Juan; Attendance: 4,132; Referees: S. KOSHIBA (JPN) - R. BARNSTORF (GER)

June 11, 2011; 20:40	Puerto Rico	0–3	Poland	(Puerto Rico) Roberto Clemente Coliseum, San Juan; Attendance: 3,728; Referees: R. BARNSTORF (GER) - S. KOSHIBA (JPN)
June 11, 2011; 20:40	(22–25, 15–25, 21–25)			(Puerto Rico) Roberto Clemente Coliseum, San Juan; Attendance: 3,728; Referees: R. BARNSTORF (GER) - S. KOSHIBA (JPN)

June 17, 2011; 19:00	United States	0–3	Poland	(United States) Sears Centre, Hoffman Estates; Attendance: 4,700; Referees: R. CHOLAKIAN (ARG) - D. ZAHARESCU (ROM)
June 17, 2011; 19:00	(22–25, 19–25, 20–25)			(United States) Sears Centre, Hoffman Estates; Attendance: 4,700; Referees: R. CHOLAKIAN (ARG) - D. ZAHARESCU (ROM)

June 18, 2011; 19:00	United States	3–1	Poland	(United States) Sears Centre, Hoffman Estates; Attendance: 6,000; Referees: D. ZAHARESCU (ROM) - R. CHOLAKIAN (ARG)
June 18, 2011; 19:00	(25–21, 15–25, 25–18, 25–22)			(United States) Sears Centre, Hoffman Estates; Attendance: 6,000; Referees: D. ZAHARESCU (ROM) - R. CHOLAKIAN (ARG)

June 24, 2011; 20:40	Poland	3–1	Puerto Rico	(Poland) Orlen Arena, Płock; Attendance: 5,500; Referees: Z. BJELIC (SRB) - P. DEREGNAUCOURT (FRA)
June 24, 2011; 20:40	(24–26, 28–26, 25–22, 25–17)			(Poland) Orlen Arena, Płock; Attendance: 5,500; Referees: Z. BJELIC (SRB) - P. DEREGNAUCOURT (FRA)

June 25, 2011; 17:10	Poland	3–0	Puerto Rico	(Poland) Orlen Arena, Płock; Attendance: 4,711; Referees: P. DEREGNAUCOURT (FRA) - Z. BJELIC (SRB)
June 25, 2011; 17:10	(25–19, 25–22, 25–20)			(Poland) Orlen Arena, Płock; Attendance: 4,711; Referees: P. DEREGNAUCOURT (FRA) - Z. BJELIC (SRB)

June 29, 2011; 20:40	Poland	1–3	Brazil	(Poland) Spodek, Katowice; Attendance: 11,000; Referees: A. ZENOVICH (RUS) - G. KARAMPETSOS (GRE)
June 29, 2011; 20:40	(23–25, 25–18, 16–25, 24–26)			(Poland) Spodek, Katowice; Attendance: 11,000; Referees: A. ZENOVICH (RUS) - G. KARAMPETSOS (GRE)

June 30, 2011; 20:40	Poland	0–3	Brazil	(Poland) Spodek, Katowice; Attendance: 11,000; Referees: G. KARAMPETSOS (GRE) - A. ZENOVICH (RUS)
June 30, 2011; 20:40	(17–25, 14–25, 21–25)			(Poland) Spodek, Katowice; Attendance: 11,000; Referees: G. KARAMPETSOS (GRE) - A. ZENOVICH (RUS)

==== Final round ====
===== Pool E =====
July 6, 2011; 20:10	Poland	3–2	Bulgaria	(Poland) Ergo Arena, Gdańsk; Attendance: 7,283; Referees: WANG Ning (CHN) - LODERUS Frans (NED)
July 6, 2011; 20:10	(25–20, 23–25, 14–25, 25–22, 15–13)			(Poland) Ergo Arena, Gdańsk; Attendance: 7,283; Referees: WANG Ning (CHN) - LODERUS Frans (NED)

July 7, 2011; 20:10	Italy	3–0	Poland	(Poland) Ergo Arena, Gdańsk; Attendance: 9,173; Referees: HOBOR Bela (HUN) - SAKAIDE Osamu (JPN)
July 7, 2011; 20:10	(25–15, 25–20, 25–20)			(Poland) Ergo Arena, Gdańsk; Attendance: 9,173; Referees: HOBOR Bela (HUN) - SAKAIDE Osamu (JPN)

July 8, 2011; 20:10	Poland	3–2	Argentina	(Poland) Ergo Arena, Gdańsk; Attendance: 8,991; Referees: WANG Ning (CHN) - LODERUS Frans (NED)
July 8, 2011; 20:10	(18–25, 25–22, 25–20, 24–26, 15–13)			(Poland) Ergo Arena, Gdańsk; Attendance: 8,991; Referees: WANG Ning (CHN) - LODERUS Frans (NED)

===== Semifinal =====
July 9, 2011; 20:00	Russia	3–1	Poland	(Poland) Ergo Arena, Gdańsk; Attendance: 10,020; Referees: LODERUS Frans (NED) - CESPEDES Denny (DOM)
July 9, 2011; 20:00	(25–22, 25–23, 22–25, 25–17)			(Poland) Ergo Arena, Gdańsk; Attendance: 10,020; Referees: LODERUS Frans (NED) - CESPEDES Denny (DOM)

===== 3rd place match =====
July 10, 2011; 17:10	Argentina	0–3	Poland	(Poland) Ergo Arena, Gdańsk; Attendance: 10,000; Referees: WANG Ning (CHN) - DEREGNAUCOURT Patric (FRA)
July 10, 2011; 17:10	(18–25, 23–25, 22–25)			(Poland) Ergo Arena, Gdańsk; Attendance: 10,000; Referees: WANG Ning (CHN) - DEREGNAUCOURT Patric (FRA)

=== 2011 European Championship ===
==== Pool D ====
September 10, 2011; 18:00	Germany	1–3	Poland	(Czech Republic) O2 Arena, Prague; Attendance: 8,000; Referees: YENER Aziz - RYCHLIK Dusan
September 10, 2011; 18:00	(19–25, 20–25, 25–22, 22–25)			(Czech Republic) O2 Arena, Prague; Attendance: 8,000; Referees: YENER Aziz - RYCHLIK Dusan

September 11, 2011; 18:00	Poland	1–3	Bulgaria	(Czech Republic) O2 Arena, Prague; Attendance: 9,250; Referees: LODERUS Frans - YENER Aziz
September 11, 2011; 18:00	(25–19, 22–25, 22–25, 23–25)			(Czech Republic) O2 Arena, Prague; Attendance: 9,250; Referees: LODERUS Frans - YENER Aziz

September 12, 2011; 18:00	Poland	1–3	Slovakia	(Czech Republic) O2 Arena, Prague; Attendance: 5,200; Referees: GODOY ALONSO Rafael - RYCHLIK Dusan
September 12, 2011; 18:00	(25–23, 21–25, 18–25, 23–25)			(Czech Republic) O2 Arena, Prague; Attendance: 5,200; Referees: GODOY ALONSO Rafael - RYCHLIK Dusan

==== Playoff ====
September 14, 2011; 18:00	Czech Republic	1–3	Poland	(Czech Republic) KV Arena, Karlovy Vary; Attendance: 4,200; Referees: YENER Aziz - JOVANOVIC Dejan
September 14, 2011; 18:00	(23–25, 25–22, 29–31, 18–25)			(Czech Republic) KV Arena, Karlovy Vary; Attendance: 4,200; Referees: YENER Aziz - JOVANOVIC Dejan

==== Quarterfinal ====
September 15, 2011; 15:00	Slovakia	0–3	Poland	(Czech Republic) KV Arena, Karlovy Vary; Attendance: 1,482; Referees: JOVANOVIC Dejan - SOBRERO Luca
September 15, 2011; 15:00	(23–25, 17–25, 19–25)			(Czech Republic) KV Arena, Karlovy Vary; Attendance: 1,482; Referees: JOVANOVIC Dejan - SOBRERO Luca

==== Semifinal ====
September 17, 2011; 15:00	Italy	3–0	Poland	(Austria) Wiener Stadthalle, Vienna; Attendance: 6,200; Referees: PIASETSKI Aliaksandr - LODERUS Frans
September 17, 2011; 15:00	(25–22, 25–21, 25–20)			(Austria) Wiener Stadthalle, Vienna; Attendance: 6,200; Referees: PIASETSKI Aliaksandr - LODERUS Frans

==== 3rd place match ====
September 18, 2011; 15:00	Poland	3–1	Russia	(Austria) Wiener Stadthalle, Vienna; Attendance: 7,000; Referees: JOVANOVIC Dejan - PIASETSKI Aliaksandr
September 18, 2011; 15:00	(25–23, 18–25, 25–21, 25–19)			(Austria) Wiener Stadthalle, Vienna; Attendance: 7,000; Referees: JOVANOVIC Dejan - PIASETSKI Aliaksandr

=== 2011 FIVB World Cup ===
==== First round (Site A) ====
November 20, 2011; 15:10	Poland	3–0	Cuba	(Japan) Nippon Gaishi Hall, Nagoya; Attendance: 2,610; Referees: Al Naama Ibrahim (QAT) - Loderus Frans (NED)
November 20, 2011; 15:10	(25–21, 25–23, 25–16) MVP: Zbigniew Bartman			(Japan) Nippon Gaishi Hall, Nagoya; Attendance: 2,610; Referees: Al Naama Ibrahim (QAT) - Loderus Frans (NED)

November 21, 2011; 15:10	Serbia	1–3	Poland	(Japan) Nippon Gaishi Hall, Nagoya; Attendance: 730; Referees: Loderus Frans (NED) - Vereecke P. (FRA)
November 21, 2011; 15:10	(25–21, 18–25, 19–25, 28–30) MVP: Michał Kubiak			(Japan) Nippon Gaishi Hall, Nagoya; Attendance: 730; Referees: Loderus Frans (NED) - Vereecke P. (FRA)

November 22, 2011; 15:10	Poland	3–1	Argentina	(Japan) Nippon Gaishi Hall, Nagoya; Attendance: 705; Referees: Vereecke P. (FRA) - Santi Simone (ITA)
November 22, 2011; 15:10	(18–25, 25–20, 25–23, 25–22) MVP: Michał Winiarski			(Japan) Nippon Gaishi Hall, Nagoya; Attendance: 705; Referees: Vereecke P. (FRA) - Santi Simone (ITA)

==== Second round (Site A) ====
November 24, 2011; 15:10	Poland	2–3	Iran	(Japan) Osaka Municipal Central Gymnasium, Osaka; Attendance: 1,240; Referees: Al Naama Ibrahim (QAT) - Vereecke P. (FRA)
November 24, 2011; 15:10	(25–23, 26–28, 25–8, 24–26, 11–15) MVP: Mehdi Bazargade			(Japan) Osaka Municipal Central Gymnasium, Osaka; Attendance: 1,240; Referees: Al Naama Ibrahim (QAT) - Vereecke P. (FRA)

November 25, 2011; 18:30	Japan	1–3	Poland	(Japan) Osaka Municipal Central Gymnasium, Osaka; Attendance: 8,000; Referees: Vereecke P. (FRA) - Santi Simone (ITA)
November 25, 2011; 18:30	(25–23, 21–25, 19–25, 18–25) MVP: Marcin Możdżonek			(Japan) Osaka Municipal Central Gymnasium, Osaka; Attendance: 8,000; Referees: Vereecke P. (FRA) - Santi Simone (ITA)

==== Third round (Site A) ====
November 27, 2011; 15:10	Poland	3–1	China	(Japan) Marine Messe, Fukuoka; Attendance: 2,600; Referees: Bjelic Zorica (SRB) - Al Naama Ibrahim (QAT)
November 27, 2011; 15:10	(25–23, 21–25, 19–25, 18–25) MVP: Jakub Jarosz			(Japan) Marine Messe, Fukuoka; Attendance: 2,600; Referees: Bjelic Zorica (SRB) - Al Naama Ibrahim (QAT)

November 28, 2011; 15:10	Poland	3–0	United States	(Japan) Marine Messe, Fukuoka; Attendance: 900; Referees: Cholakian R. (ARG) - Labasta Milan (CZE)
November 28, 2011; 15:10	(25–15, 25–20, 25–18) MVP: Łukasz Żygadło			(Japan) Marine Messe, Fukuoka; Attendance: 900; Referees: Cholakian R. (ARG) - Labasta Milan (CZE)

November 29, 2011; 11:10	Poland	3–0	Egypt	(Japan) Marine Messe, Fukuoka; Attendance: 350; Referees: Turci Paulo (BRA) - Santi Simone (ITA)
November 29, 2011; 11:10	(25–21, 26–24, 25–21) MVP: Piotr Nowakowski			(Japan) Marine Messe, Fukuoka; Attendance: 350; Referees: Turci Paulo (BRA) - Santi Simone (ITA)

==== Fourth round (Site A) ====
December 2, 2011; 15:10	Poland	3–2	Italy	(Japan) Yoyogi National Stadium, Tokyo; Attendance: 1,500; Referees: Wang Ning (CHN) - Cholakian R. (ARG)
December 2, 2011; 15:10	(17–25, 20–25, 25–23, 25–21, 15–12) MVP: Michał Ruciak			(Japan) Yoyogi National Stadium, Tokyo; Attendance: 1,500; Referees: Wang Ning (CHN) - Cholakian R. (ARG)

December 3, 2011; 15:10	Poland	2–3	Brazil	(Japan) Yoyogi National Stadium, Tokyo; Attendance: 5,000; Referees: Cholakian R. (ARG) - Vereecke P. (FRA)
December 3, 2011; 15:10	(25–18, 25–21, 18–25, 19–25, 12–15)			(Japan) Yoyogi National Stadium, Tokyo; Attendance: 5,000; Referees: Cholakian R. (ARG) - Vereecke P. (FRA)

December 4, 2011; 11:10	Poland	2–3	Russia	(Japan) Yoyogi National Stadium, Tokyo; Attendance: 2,400; Referees: Loderus Frans (NED) - Bjelic Zorica (SRB)
December 4, 2011; 11:10	(23–25, 25–23, 22–25, 25–17, 15–17)			(Japan) Yoyogi National Stadium, Tokyo; Attendance: 2,400; Referees: Loderus Frans (NED) - Bjelic Zorica (SRB)

=== 2012 FIVB World League ===
==== Pool B ====
May 18, 2012; 20:10	Brazil	2–3	Poland	(Canada) Ricoh Coliseum, Toronto; Attendance: 7,500; Referees: PASQUALI, Fabrizio (ITA) - SALVATORE, Patricia (USA)
May 18, 2012; 20:10	(22–25, 25–27, 27–25, 25–22, 12–15)			(Canada) Ricoh Coliseum, Toronto; Attendance: 7,500; Referees: PASQUALI, Fabrizio (ITA) - SALVATORE, Patricia (USA)

May 19, 2012; 20:10	Poland	2–3	Finland	(Canada) Ricoh Coliseum, Toronto; Attendance: 2,800; Referees: SALVATORE, Patricia (USA) - CESPEDES, Denny (DOM)
May 19, 2012; 20:10	(25–23, 23–25, 21–25, 25–22, 9–15)			(Canada) Ricoh Coliseum, Toronto; Attendance: 2,800; Referees: SALVATORE, Patricia (USA) - CESPEDES, Denny (DOM)

May 20, 2012; 20:10	Canada	1–3	Poland	(Canada) Ricoh Coliseum, Toronto; Attendance: 4,200; Referees: PASQUALI, Fabrizio (ITA) - SALVATORE, Patricia (USA)
May 20, 2012; 20:10	(25–17, 19–25, 21–25, 19–25)			(Canada) Ricoh Coliseum, Toronto; Attendance: 4,200; Referees: PASQUALI, Fabrizio (ITA) - SALVATORE, Patricia (USA)

June 1, 2012; 17:40	Poland	3–0	Canada	(Poland) Spodek, Katowice; Attendance: 8,800; Referees: SANTI Simone (ITA) - SCHURMANN Philippe (LIE)
June 1, 2012; 17:40	(28–26, 25–18, 25–20)			(Poland) Spodek, Katowice; Attendance: 8,800; Referees: SANTI Simone (ITA) - SCHURMANN Philippe (LIE)

June 2, 2012; 17:40	Poland	3–0	Finland	(Poland) Spodek, Katowice; Attendance: 10,720; Referees: HUDIK Martin (CZE) - SANTI Simone (ITA)
June 2, 2012; 17:40	(26–24, 25–18, 25–18)			(Poland) Spodek, Katowice; Attendance: 10,720; Referees: HUDIK Martin (CZE) - SANTI Simone (ITA)

June 3, 2012; 20:40	Poland	3–2	Brazil	(Poland) Spodek, Katowice; Attendance: 11,000; Referees: SANTI Simone (ITA) - HUDIK Martin (CZE)
June 3, 2012; 20:40	(26–24, 23–25, 25–23, 23–25, 15–10)			(Poland) Spodek, Katowice; Attendance: 11,000; Referees: SANTI Simone (ITA) - HUDIK Martin (CZE)

June 8, 2012; 12:30	Canada	0–3	Poland	(Brazil) Ginásio Adib Moyses Dib, São Bernardo do Campo; Attendance: 1,590; Referees: CHOLAKIAN, Rolando (ARG) - JOVANOVIC, Dejan (SRB)
June 8, 2012; 12:30	(20–25, 20–25, 18–25)			(Brazil) Ginásio Adib Moyses Dib, São Bernardo do Campo; Attendance: 1,590; Referees: CHOLAKIAN, Rolando (ARG) - JOVANOVIC, Dejan (SRB)

June 9, 2012; 12:40	Poland	3–1	Finland	(Brazil) Ginásio Adib Moyses Dib, São Bernardo do Campo; Attendance: 1,210; Referees: JOVANOVIC, Dejan (SRB) - LUNGU, Silvian (ROM)
June 9, 2012; 12:40	(23–25, 25–17, 25–19, 25–13)			(Brazil) Ginásio Adib Moyses Dib, São Bernardo do Campo; Attendance: 1,210; Referees: JOVANOVIC, Dejan (SRB) - LUNGU, Silvian (ROM)

June 10, 2012; 10:00	Brazil	3–1	Poland	(Brazil) Ginásio Adib Moyses Dib, São Bernardo do Campo; Attendance: 5,700; Referees: JOVANOVIC, Dejan (SRB) & AZEVEDO, Avelino (POR)
June 10, 2012; 10:00	(26–24, 25–17, 23–25, 25–23)			(Brazil) Ginásio Adib Moyses Dib, São Bernardo do Campo; Attendance: 5,700; Referees: JOVANOVIC, Dejan (SRB) & AZEVEDO, Avelino (POR)

June 15, 2012; 20:10	Finland	0–3	Poland	(Finland) Tampere Ice Stadium, Tampere; Attendance: 4,010; Referees: Gerothodoros (GRE) - Barnstorf (GER)
June 15, 2012; 20:10	(16–25, 24–26, 19–25)			(Finland) Tampere Ice Stadium, Tampere; Attendance: 4,010; Referees: Gerothodoros (GRE) - Barnstorf (GER)

June 16, 2012; 16:10	Canada	0–3	Poland	(Finland) Tampere Ice Stadium, Tampere; Attendance: 3,625; Referees: Markov (RUS) - Geothodoros (GRE)
June 16, 2012; 16:10	(24–26, 22–25, 23–25)			(Finland) Tampere Ice Stadium, Tampere; Attendance: 3,625; Referees: Markov (RUS) - Geothodoros (GRE)

June 17, 2012; 16:10	Poland	3–1	Brazil	(Finland) Tampere Ice Stadium, Tampere; Attendance: 2,970; Referees: Zenovich (RUS) - Barnstorf (GER)
June 17, 2012; 16:10	(25–22, 25–23, 21–25, 25–22)			(Finland) Tampere Ice Stadium, Tampere; Attendance: 2,970; Referees: Zenovich (RUS) - Barnstorf (GER)

==== Final round ====
===== Pool F =====
July 5, 2012; 17:40	Brazil	2–3	Poland	(Bulgaria) Arena Armeec, Sofia; Attendance: 3,000; Referees: Nasr SHAABAN (EGY) - Bela HOBOR (HUN)
July 5, 2012; 17:40	(25–23, 23–25, 25–23, 17–25, 10–15)			(Bulgaria) Arena Armeec, Sofia; Attendance: 3,000; Referees: Nasr SHAABAN (EGY) - Bela HOBOR (HUN)

July 6, 2012; 17:40	Poland	3–0	Cuba	(Bulgaria) Arena Armeec, Sofia; Attendance: 3,500; Referees: Frans LODERUS (NED) - WANG Ning (CHN)
July 6, 2012; 17:40	(25–23, 25–20, 25–23)			(Bulgaria) Arena Armeec, Sofia; Attendance: 3,500; Referees: Frans LODERUS (NED) - WANG Ning (CHN)

===== Semifinal =====
July 7, 2012; 20:55	Poland	3–0	Bulgaria	(Bulgaria) Arena Armeec, Sofia; Attendance: 11,000; Referees: Frans LODERUS (NED) - Akihiko TANO (JPN)
July 7, 2012; 20:55	(25–23, 25–20, 25–18)			(Bulgaria) Arena Armeec, Sofia; Attendance: 11,000; Referees: Frans LODERUS (NED) - Akihiko TANO (JPN)

===== Final =====
July 8, 2012; 20:55	Poland	3–0	United States	(Bulgaria) Arena Armeec, Sofia; Attendance: 4,000; Referees: Bela HOBOR (HUN) - Milan LABASTA (CZE)
July 8, 2012; 20:55	(25–17, 26–24, 25–20)			(Bulgaria) Arena Armeec, Sofia; Attendance: 4,000; Referees: Bela HOBOR (HUN) - Milan LABASTA (CZE)

=== 2012 Olympic Games ===
- All times are British Summer Time (UTC+01:00).

==== Pool A ====
July 29, 2012; 20:00	Italy	1–3	Poland	(United Kingdom) Earls Court Exhibition Centre, London; Attendance: 15,000; Referees: Rolando Cholakian (ARG) - Zorica Bjelić (SRB)
July 29, 2012; 20:00	(25–21, 20–25, 23–25, 14–25)			(United Kingdom) Earls Court Exhibition Centre, London; Attendance: 15,000; Referees: Rolando Cholakian (ARG) - Zorica Bjelić (SRB)

July 31, 2012; 11:40	Poland	1–3	Bulgaria	(United Kingdom) Earls Court Exhibition Centre, London; Attendance: 11,300; Referees: Andrey Zenovich (RUS) - Akihiko Tano (JPN)
July 31, 2012; 11:40	(22–25, 27–29, 25–13, 23–25)			(United Kingdom) Earls Court Exhibition Centre, London; Attendance: 11,300; Referees: Andrey Zenovich (RUS) - Akihiko Tano (JPN)

August 2, 2012; 16:45	Poland	3–0	Argentina	(United Kingdom) Earls Court Exhibition Centre, London; Attendance: 13,000; Referees: Georgios Karampetsos (GRE) - Ibrahim Al-Naama (QAT)
August 2, 2012; 16:45	(25–18, 25–20, 25–16)			(United Kingdom) Earls Court Exhibition Centre, London; Attendance: 13,000; Referees: Georgios Karampetsos (GRE) - Ibrahim Al-Naama (QAT)

August 4, 2012; 11:30	Great Britain	0–3	Poland	(United Kingdom) Earls Court Exhibition Centre, London; Attendance: 14,900; Referees: Ibrahim Al-Naama (QAT) - Georgios Karampetsos (GRE)
August 4, 2012; 11:30	(16–25, 19–25, 18–25)			(United Kingdom) Earls Court Exhibition Centre, London; Attendance: 14,900; Referees: Ibrahim Al-Naama (QAT) - Georgios Karampetsos (GRE)

August 6, 2012; 09:30	Australia	3–1	Poland	(United Kingdom) Earls Court Exhibition Centre, London; Attendance: 12,000; Referees: Rogerio Espicalsky (BRA) - Andrey Zenovich (RUS)
August 6, 2012; 09:30	(25–21, 25–22, 18–25, 25–22)			(United Kingdom) Earls Court Exhibition Centre, London; Attendance: 12,000; Referees: Rogerio Espicalsky (BRA) - Andrey Zenovich (RUS)

==== Quarterfinal ====
August 8, 2012; 19:30	Poland	0–3	Russia	(United Kingdom) Earls Court Exhibition Centre, London; Attendance: 14,000; Referees: Frans Loderus (NED) - Nasr Shaaban (EGY)
August 8, 2012; 19:30	(17–25, 23–25, 21–25)			(United Kingdom) Earls Court Exhibition Centre, London; Attendance: 14,000; Referees: Frans Loderus (NED) - Nasr Shaaban (EGY)

=== 2013 FIVB World League ===
==== Pool A ====
June 7, 2013; 17:55	Poland	1–3	Brazil	(Poland) Torwar Hall, Warsaw; Attendance: 4,904; Referees: CUK Dragutin (SRB) - SANTI Simone (ITA)
June 7, 2013; 17:55	(22–25, 20–25, 25–22, 15–25)			(Poland) Torwar Hall, Warsaw; Attendance: 4,904; Referees: CUK Dragutin (SRB) - SANTI Simone (ITA)

June 9, 2013; 20:25	Poland	2–3	Brazil	(Poland) Atlas Arena, Łódź; Attendance: 11,012; Referees: SANTI Simone (ITA) - CUK Dragutin (SRB)
June 9, 2013; 20:25	(26–28, 22–25, 25–23, 25–22, 10–15)			(Poland) Atlas Arena, Łódź; Attendance: 11,012; Referees: SANTI Simone (ITA) - CUK Dragutin (SRB)

June 21, 2013; 20:10	France	3–2	Poland	(France) Kindarena, Rouen; Attendance: 4,900; Referees: BAJCI Peter (SVK) - WALEED El Kheshen (EGY)
June 21, 2013; 20:10	(25–23, 21–25, 22–25, 25–21, 15–11)			(France) Kindarena, Rouen; Attendance: 4,900; Referees: BAJCI Peter (SVK) - WALEED El Kheshen (EGY)

June 23, 2013; 18:10	France	3–2	Poland	(France) Palais des Sports A. Brouat, Toulouse; Attendance: 4,000; Referees: WALEED El Kheshen (EGY) - BAJCI Peter (SVK)
June 23, 2013; 18:10	(25–21, 23–25, 25–20, 21–25, 15–13)			(France) Palais des Sports A. Brouat, Toulouse; Attendance: 4,000; Referees: WALEED El Kheshen (EGY) - BAJCI Peter (SVK)

June 28, 2013; 20:25	Poland	3–2	Argentina	(Poland) Łuczniczka, Bydgoszcz; Attendance: 6,701; Referees: OLEYNIK Vladimir (RUS) - Mc LEAN Scott (CAN)
June 28, 2013; 20:25	(26–24, 19–25, 19–25, 25–17, 15–8)			(Poland) Łuczniczka, Bydgoszcz; Attendance: 6,701; Referees: OLEYNIK Vladimir (RUS) - Mc LEAN Scott (CAN)

June 30, 2013; 20:25	Poland	3–1	Argentina	(Poland) Ergo Arena, Gdańsk; Attendance: 11,891; Referees: Mc LEAN Scott (CAN) - OLEYNIK Vladimir (RUS)
June 30, 2013; 20:25	(18–25, 25–21, 26–24, 25–17)			(Poland) Ergo Arena, Gdańsk; Attendance: 11,891; Referees: Mc LEAN Scott (CAN) - OLEYNIK Vladimir (RUS)

July 5, 2013; 20:25	Poland	3–2	United States	(Poland) Spodek, Katowice; Attendance: 11,000; Referees: RAPTIS Vasileios (GRE) - MURANAKA Shin (JPN)
July 5, 2013; 20:25	(25–22, 19–25, 13–25, 30–28, 18–16)			(Poland) Spodek, Katowice; Attendance: 11,000; Referees: RAPTIS Vasileios (GRE) - MURANAKA Shin (JPN)

July 7, 2013; 20:25	Poland	3–1	United States	(Poland) Centennial Hall, Wrocław; Attendance: 6,000; Referees: MURANAKA Shin (JPN) - RAPTIS Vasileios (GRE)
July 7, 2013; 20:25	(25–23, 17–25, 25–21, 25–23)			(Poland) Centennial Hall, Wrocław; Attendance: 6,000; Referees: MURANAKA Shin (JPN) - RAPTIS Vasileios (GRE)

July 12, 2013; 20:08	Bulgaria	3–0	Poland	(Bulgaria) Palace of Culture and Sports, Varna; Attendance: 5,600; Referees: Bayram DIKMENTEPE (TUR) - Peter GROENEWEGEN (NED)
July 12, 2013; 20:08	(25–21, 25–21, 25–21)			(Bulgaria) Palace of Culture and Sports, Varna; Attendance: 5,600; Referees: Bayram DIKMENTEPE (TUR) - Peter GROENEWEGEN (NED)

July 13, 2013; 21:10	Bulgaria	3–2	Poland	(Bulgaria) Palace of Culture and Sports, Varna; Attendance: 5,600; Referees: Peter GROENEWEGEN (NED) - Bayram DIKMENTEPE (TUR)
July 13, 2013; 21:10	(20–25, 23–25, 25–21, 25–21, 19–17)			(Bulgaria) Palace of Culture and Sports, Varna; Attendance: 5,600; Referees: Peter GROENEWEGEN (NED) - Bayram DIKMENTEPE (TUR)

=== 2013 European Championship ===
==== Pool B ====
September 20, 2013; 17:00	Poland	3–1	Turkey	(Poland) Ergo Arena, Gdańsk; Attendance: 9,800; Referees: HECKFORD Nicholas - HUHTANISKA Ahti
September 20, 2013; 17:00	(25–22, 25–15, 22–25, 25–21)			(Poland) Ergo Arena, Gdańsk; Attendance: 9,800; Referees: HECKFORD Nicholas - HUHTANISKA Ahti

September 21, 2013; 20:00	France	3–1	Poland	(Poland) Ergo Arena, Gdańsk; Attendance: 10,600; Referees: SIMONOVIC Vladimir - HECKFORD Nicholas
September 21, 2013; 20:00	(25–22, 25–23, 20–25, 25–20)			(Poland) Ergo Arena, Gdańsk; Attendance: 10,600; Referees: SIMONOVIC Vladimir - HECKFORD Nicholas

September 22, 2013; 20:00	Slovakia	1–3	Poland	(Poland) Ergo Arena, Gdańsk; Attendance: 10,800; Referees: HECKFORD Nicholas - HUHTANISKA Ahti
September 22, 2013; 20:00	(24–26, 25–20, 19–25, 22–25)			(Poland) Ergo Arena, Gdańsk; Attendance: 10,800; Referees: HECKFORD Nicholas - HUHTANISKA Ahti

==== Playoff ====
September 24, 2013; 20:00	Poland	2–3	Bulgaria	(Poland) Ergo Arena, Gdańsk; Attendance: 6,250; Referees: PASQUALI Fabrizio - SIMONOVIC Vladimir
September 24, 2013; 20:00	(25–22, 25–22, 20–25, 24–26, 16–18)			(Poland) Ergo Arena, Gdańsk; Attendance: 6,250; Referees: PASQUALI Fabrizio - SIMONOVIC Vladimir

== Friendly matches ==
=== 2011 ===
May 20, 2011	Poland	3–1	Russia	(Poland) Milicz
May 20, 2011	(23–25, 28–26, 27–25, 25–19)			(Poland) Milicz

May 21, 2011	Russia	1–3	Poland	(Poland) Twardogóra
May 21, 2011	(23–25, 25–23, 25–23, 25–22)			(Poland) Twardogóra

August 18, 2011	Poland	0–3	France	(Poland) Ostrowiec Świętokrzyski
August 18, 2011	(21–25, 25–27, 21–25)			(Poland) Ostrowiec Świętokrzyski

August 19, 2011	Poland	3–1	France	(Poland) Ostrowiec Świętokrzyski
August 19, 2011	(22–25, 25–21, 25–22, 25–21)			(Poland) Ostrowiec Świętokrzyski

==== 2011 Memoriał Huberta Jerzego Wagnera ====
August 26, 2011	Poland	0–3	Czech Republic	(Poland) Spodek, Katowice
August 26, 2011	(21–25, 18–25, 25–27)			(Poland) Spodek, Katowice

August 27, 2011	Poland	1–3	Italy	(Poland) Spodek, Katowice
August 27, 2011	(15–25, 25–13, 23–25, 21–25)			(Poland) Spodek, Katowice

August 28, 2011	Poland	0–3	Russia	(Poland) Spodek, Katowice
August 28, 2011	(22–25, 16–25, 19–25)			(Poland) Spodek, Katowice

November 11, 2011	Poland	3–0	Czech Republic	(Poland) Legionowo Arena, Legionowo
November 11, 2011	(25–21, 26–24, 27–25)			(Poland) Legionowo Arena, Legionowo

November 12, 2011	Czech Republic	2–3	Poland	(Poland) Legionowo Arena, Legionowo
November 12, 2011	(26–28, 18–25, 28–26, 25–21, 11–15)			(Poland) Legionowo Arena, Legionowo

=== 2012 ===
May 11, 2012	Poland	3–0	Australia	(Poland) Atlas Arena, Łódź
May 11, 2012	(25–23, 25–23, 25–20)			(Poland) Atlas Arena, Łódź

==== 2012 Memoriał Huberta Jerzego Wagnera ====
July 20, 2012	Poland	3–0	Iran	(Poland) Zielona Góra
July 20, 2012	(26–24, 25–20, 25–21)			(Poland) Zielona Góra

July 21, 2012	Poland	3–1	Germany	(Poland) Zielona Góra
July 21, 2012	(36–34, 25–23, 17–25, 25–21)			(Poland) Zielona Góra

July 22, 2012	Poland	3–0	Argentina	(Poland) Zielona Góra
July 22, 2012	(25–19, 25–23, 25–16)			(Poland) Zielona Góra

=== 2013 ===
May 24, 2013	Poland	3–1	Serbia	(Poland) Milicz
May 24, 2013	(29–27, 25–21, 22–25, 25–19)			(Poland) Milicz

May 25, 2013	Poland	1–3	Serbia	(Poland) Twardogóra
May 25, 2013	(18–25, 25–20, 30–32, 17–25)			(Poland) Twardogóra

August 30, 2013	Serbia	3–1	Poland	(Serbia) Belgrad
August 30, 2013	(25–20, 20–25, 25–18, 25–23)			(Serbia) Belgrad

August 31, 2013	Serbia	3–2	Poland	(Serbia) Belgrad
August 31, 2013	(19–25, 28–30, 25–18, 25–23, 15–13)			(Serbia) Belgrad

September 1, 2013	Serbia	3–1	Poland	(Serbia) Belgrad
September 1, 2013	(28–26, 23–25, 25–18, 25–18)			(Serbia) Belgrad

==== 2013 Memoriał Huberta Jerzego Wagnera ====
September 6, 2013	Poland	3–1	Netherlands	(Poland) Orlen Arena, Płock
September 6, 2013	(26–28, 25–22, 25–15, 25–18)			(Poland) Orlen Arena, Płock

September 7, 2013	Poland	3–0	Germany	(Poland) Orlen Arena, Płock
September 7, 2013	(25–19, 25–21, 25–19)			(Poland) Orlen Arena, Płock

September 8, 2013	Poland	1–3	Russia	(Poland) Orlen Arena, Płock
September 8, 2013	(19–25, 20–25, 25–22, 18–25)			(Poland) Orlen Arena, Płock
