= Elijah McCall =

American boxer

Elijah McCall (born March 3, 1988, in Chicago, Illinois) is an American former heavyweight boxer. He is the son of former heavyweight champion Oliver McCall.

== Early life ==
Elijah passed on a football scholarship at James Madison University. to pursue boxing. . he was a star highschool running back at Bassett high school in Virginia.

== Boxing career ==
Elijah has had 16 pro bouts to date, with 12 wins (11 by knockout), 3 losses (All by KO or TKO), and 1 draw. He was surprisingly knocked out in the fourth round after dominating Dieuly Aristilde, after dropping him twice in the first round, yet went on to get flattened with a right hand himself in the fourth.

== Professional boxing record (Incomplete) ==
12 Wins (11 knockouts, 1 decision), 3 Losses (3 knockouts), 1 Draw
Result	Record	Opponent	Type	Round	Date	Location	Notes
Loss	11-3-1	(Poland) Marcin Rekowski	TKO	5	18/05/2013	Legionowo Arena, Legionowo, Poland	Referee stopped the bout at 1:36 of the fifth round.
Loss	11-2-1	(United States) Andy Ruiz Jr.	TKO	3	07/12/2012	(United States) Texas Station, Las Vegas, Nevada	Referee stopped the bout at 2:59 of the third round.
Win	11-1-1	(United States) Jason "Big Daddy" Massie	KO	5	13/07/2012	(United States) UIC Pavilion, Chicago, Illinois	Massie knocked out at 0:36 of the fifth round.
Win	10-1-1	(United States) Travis Fulton	TKO	2	21/06/2012	(United States) The Belvedere, Elk Grove, Illinois	Referee stopped the bout at 2:10 of the second round.
Win	9-1-1	(United States) Stanley Allen	KO	6	25/05/2012	(United States) Horseshoe Hammond, Hammond, Indiana	Allen knocked out at 2:26 of the sixth round.
Win	8-1-1	(United States) Corey Winfield	UD	5	03/02/2012	(United States) Guilford Convention Center, Greensboro, North Carolina	49-46, 48-47, 48-47.
Win	7-1-1	(United States) Maurice Winslow	TKO	1	16/07/2011	(United States) Greensboro Coliseum Complex, Greensboro, North Carolina	
Win	6-1-1	(United States) Octavius Davis	KO	2	21/05/2011	(United States) Rec Center, Wilson, North Carolina	Davis knocked out at 1:15 of the second round.
Win	5-1-1	(United States) Matt Green	KO	2	16/04/2011	(United States) Greensboro Coliseum Complex, Greensboro, North Carolina	
Loss	4-1-1	(Haiti) Dieuly Aristilde	KO	4	16/02/2010	(United States) Seminole Hard Rock Hotel and Casino Hollywood, Hollywood, Florida	McCall knocked out at 1:13 of the fourth round.
Win	4-0-1	(United States) Reginald Jackson	KO	2	23/10/2009	(United States) The Orleans, Las Vegas, Nevada	Jackson knocked out at 1:25 of the second round.
Win	3-0-1	(United States) Chad J. Davis	KO	1	22/05/2009	(United States) The Orleans, Las Vegas, Nevada	Davis knocked out at 2:49 of the first round.
Draw	2-0-1	(Mexico) Alvaro Morales	PTS	4	06/03/2009	(United States) The Orleans, Las Vegas, Nevada	40-36, 37-39, 38-38.
Win	2-0	(United States) Yohan Banks	TKO	1	30/01/2009	(United States) The Orleans, Las Vegas, Nevada	Referee stopped the bout at 2:23 of the first round.
Win	1-0	(United States) Darion Moss	TKO	1	21/06/2008	(United States) Seminole Hard Rock Hotel and Casino Hollywood, Hollywood, Florida	Referee stopped the bout at 2:24 of the first round.

== See also ==
- Notable boxing families
