= Krzysztof Zimnoch =

Polish boxer

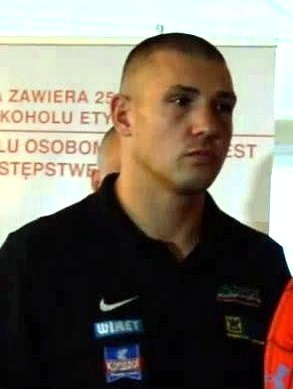

Personal information
- Nationality: (Poland) Polish
- Born: Krzysztof Zimnoch; 6 September 1983 (age 42) Białystok
- Height: 1.91 m (6 ft 3 in)
- Weight: Cruiserweight; Heavyweight

Boxing career
- Reach: 191 cm (75 in)
- Stance: Orthodox

Boxing record
- Total fights: 26
- Wins: 22
- Win by KO: 15
- Losses: 3
- Draws: 1
Medal record
EU Amateur Championships
Silver medal – second place	2007 Dublin	Heavyweight

Krzysztof Zimnoch (born 6 September 1983) is a Polish professional heavyweight boxer affiliated to the Hetman Białystok Boxing Club. He holds an amateur win over former WBC heavyweight champion Deontay Wilder.

== Professional career ==
Zimnoch made his professional boxing debut on 20 February 2010 against Keon Graham at the Horseshoe Casino in Hammond, Indiana. He won by KO in round 1. Zimnoch trains in London and was involved in a brawl with fellow Polish heavyweight Artur Szpilka during a press conference.

In May 2013, he defeated Oliver McCall. After a two-year lay-off, Zimonch stopped Nigerian fighter Gbenga Oloukun.

== Professional boxing record ==
26 fights	22 wins	3 losses
By knockout	15	3
By decision	7	0
By disqualification	0	0
Draws	1	

No.	Result	Record	Opponent	Type	Round, time	Date	Location	Notes
26	Loss	22–3–1	(Poland) Krzysztof Twardowski	TKO	2 (6), 0:45	23 Nov 2019	(Poland) Sport Hall, Radom	
25	Loss	22–2–1	(United States) Joey Abell	KO	3 (12), 2:10	9 Sep 2017	(Poland) Sport Hall, Radom	
24	Win	22–1–1	(United States) Michael Grant	KO	2 (8), 1:22	22 Apr 2017	(Poland) Legionowo Arena, Legionowo	
23	Win	21–1–1	(United States) Mike Mollo	TKO	7 (10), 3:00	25 Feb 2017	(Poland) Azoty Arena, Szczecin	
22	Win	20–1–1	(Poland) Marcin Rekowski	SD	8	22 Oct 2016	(Poland) Salt Mine, Wieliczka	
21	Win	19–1–1	(Germany) Konstantin Airich	TKO	4 (6), 2:36	28 May 2016	(Poland) Azot Arena, Szczecin	
20	Loss	18–1–1	(United States) Mike Mollo	KO	1 (10), 2:08	20 Feb 2016	(Poland) Arena Hall, Legionowo	For vacant Republic of Poland International Heavyweight title.
19	Win	18–0–1	(Nigeria) Gbenga Oloukun	KO	2 (8), 0:58	17 Oct 2015	(Poland) Wieliczka Salt Mine, Wieliczka	
18	Win	17–0–1	(Canada) Art Binkowski	UD	8	19 Oct 2013	(Poland) Wieliczka Salt Mine, Wieliczka	
17	Win	16–0–1	(Poland) Mateusz Malujda	UD	8	18 Aug 2013	(Poland) Amfiteatr, Międzyzdroje	
16	Win	15–0–1	(United States) Oliver McCall	UD	8	18 May 2013	(Poland) Legionowo Arena, Legionowo	
15	Win	14–0–1	(Poland) Damian Trzcinski	TKO	1 (6), 1:25	23 Feb 2013	(Poland) Ergo Arena, Gdańsk	
14	Win	13–0–1	(Hungary) Ferenc Zsalek	TKO	4 (6), 2:30	2 Dec 2012	(Poland) OSiR Arena, Wolomin	
13	Win	12–0–1	(Bosnia and Herzegovina) Adnan Buharalija	KO	1 (6), 1:30	30 Jun 2012	(Poland) Atlas Arena, Łódź	
12	Win	11–0–1	(Germany) Ben Nsafoah	UD	6	2 Jun 2011	(Poland) Łuczniczka, Bydgoszcz	
11	Win	10–0–1	(Croatia) Vjekoslav Bajic	KO	2 (6)	24 Mar 2012	(Poland) Hall, Oświęcim	
10	Win	9–0–1	(Hungary) Gabor Farkas	UD	4	3 Dec 2011	(Poland) Hotel Hilton, Warsaw	
9	Win	8–0–1	(Germany) Sebastian Tuchscherer	TKO	3 (4), 1:49	15 Oct 2011	(Poland) Spodek, Katowice	
8	Win	7–0–1	(Croatia) Toni Visic	RTD	3 (6)	16 Sep 2011	(Poland) Torwar Hall, Warsaw	
7	Win	6–0–1	(Belgium) Abdelhadi Hanine	TKO	2 (4), 1:47	23 Oct 2010	(Poland) Hotel Hilton, Warsaw	
6	Win	5–0–1	(Lithuania) Remigijus Ziausys	UD	4	16 Oct 2010	(Poland) Legionowo Arena, Legionowo	
5	Win	4–0–1	(Cameroon) Panjoundoro Nsangou Aouna	TKO	1 (4), 1:05	25 Sep 2010	(Poland) Torwar Hall, Warsaw	
4	Win	3–0–1	(United States) Michael Moncrief	TKO	3 (4)	29 May 2010	(United States) UIC Pavilion, Chicago, Illinois	
3	Draw	2–0–1	(United States) Joey Montoya	MD	4	30 Apr 2010	(United States) UIC Pavilion, Chicago, Illinois	
2	Win	2–0	(United States) Dustin Hedrick	TKO	1 (4), 0:42	26 Mar 2010	(United States) UIC Pavilion, Chicago, Illinois	
1	Win	1–0	(United States) Keon Graham	KO	1 (4), 2:47	20 Feb 2010	(United States) Horseshoe Casino, Hammond, Indiana	Professional debut.
