= Marcin Rekowski =

Polish boxer

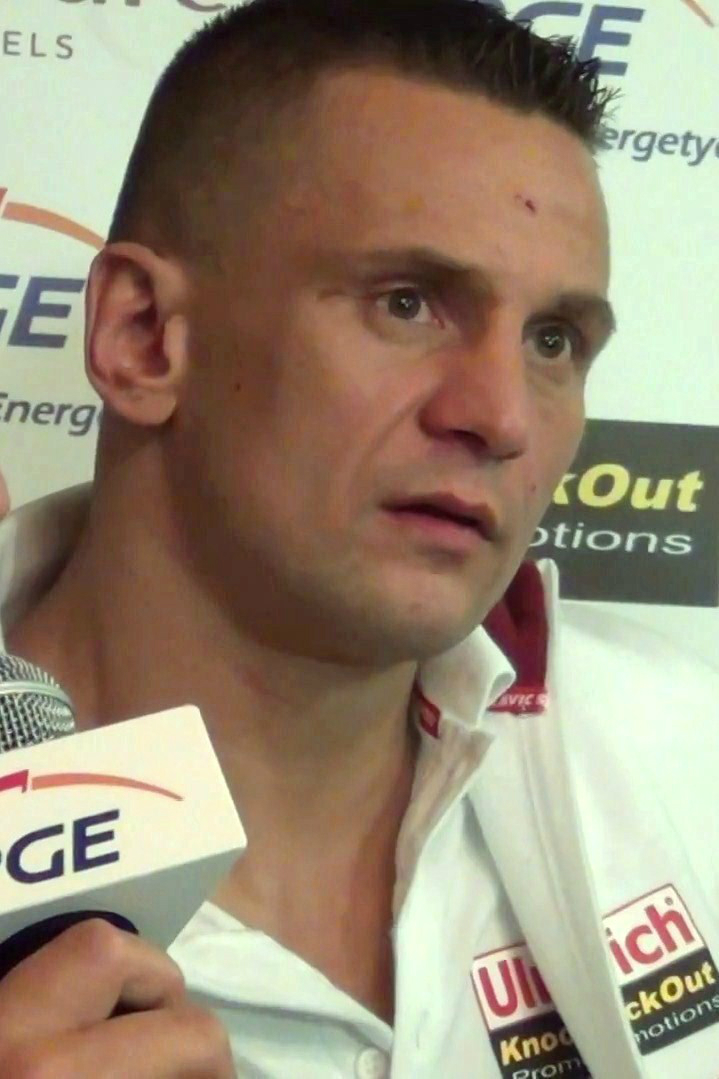

Personal information
- Nickname: Rex
- Born: January 10, 1978 (age 48) Kościerzyna, Poland
- Height: 189 cm (6 ft 2 in)
- Weight: Heavyweight

Boxing career
- Stance: Orthodox

Boxing record
- Total fights: 23
- Wins: 18
- Win by KO: 14
- Losses: 5
- Draws: 0
- No contests: 0

Marcin Rekowski (born 10 January 1978) is a Polish former professional boxer who competed between 2012 and 2024.

== Professional boxing record ==
18 Wins (15 knockouts, 2 decisions), 5 Losses, 0 Draws
Res.	Record	Opponent	Type	Round	Date	Location	Notes
Win	18-5	(Poland) Patryk Kowoll	TKO	4 (12)	2017-11-19	(Poland) Tczew	
Loss	17-5	(France) Carlos Takam	KO	4 (12)	2017-01-29	(Macau) Cotai Arena, Macao, S A R	For vacant IBF Inter-Continental Heavyweight title
Loss	17-4	(Poland) Krzysztof Zimnoch	SD	8	2016-10-22	(Poland) Salt Mine, Wieliczka	
Loss	17-3	(Poland) Andrzej Wawrzyk	TKO	7 (10)	2016-04-02	(Poland) Kraków Arena, Kraków	
Win	17-2	(Poland) Bartosz Szwarczynski	TKO	1 (8), 1:38	2015-12-06	(Poland) Warsaw	
Loss	16-2	(Dominican Republic) Nagy Aguilera	TKO	10 (10), 2:58	2015-09-26	(Poland) Łódź	
Win	16–1	(Nigeria) Gbenga Oloukun	TKO	5 (8), 1:25	2015-04-10	(Poland) Gliwice	
Win	15–1	(Poland) Albert Sosnowski	TKO	7 (10), 0:48	2014-05-31	(Poland) Lublin	
Win	14–1	(United States) Oliver McCall	UD	10	2014-04-26	(Poland) Legionowo Arena, Legionowo	
Win	13–1	(Poland) Mateusz Malujda	KO	3 (6), 2:08	2014-03-15	(Poland) Arłamów	
Loss	12–1	(United States) Oliver McCall	SD	8	2014-02-01	(Poland) Opole	
Win	12–0	(Turkey) Serdar Uysal	SD	8	2013-08-23	(Germany) Hamburg	
Win	11–0	(Poland) Marcin Czech	TKO	1 (4), 0:52	2013-10-05	(Poland) Malbork	
Win	10–0	(United Kingdom) Danny Williams	TKO	4 (8), 1:47	2013-08-23	(Romania) Galați	
Win	9–0	(United States) Elijah McCall	TKO	5 (6), 1:36	2013-05-18	(Poland) Legionowo Arena, Legionowo	
Win	8–0	(Poland) Bartosz Szwaryzyński	TKO	1 (4), 1:32	2013-03-16	(Poland) Tczew	
Win	7–0	(Poland) Patryk Kowoll	RTD	5 (8), 0:01	2013-01-18	(Poland) Pruszków	
Win	6–0	(Hungary) Ferenc Zsalek	UD	8	2012-11-17	(Germany) Koepenick	
Win	5–0	(Latvia) Aleksandrs Dunecs	TKO	2 (8), 2:44	2012-08-18	(Poland) Międzyzdroje	
Win	4–0	(Czech Republic) Vaclav Fiala	TKO	1 (4), 0:30	2012-08-12	(Germany) Berlin	
Win	3–0	(Belarus) Henadzi Daniliuk	KO	2 (4), 2:29	2012-06-30	(Poland) Łódź	
Win	2–0	(Czech Republic) David Liska	TKO	1 (4), 1:06	2012-06-02	(Poland) Bydgoszcz	
Win	1–0	(Germany) Manuel Reuss	TKO	2 (4), 2:51	2012-05-18	(Poland) Poznań	
