= Mike Mollo =

American boxer

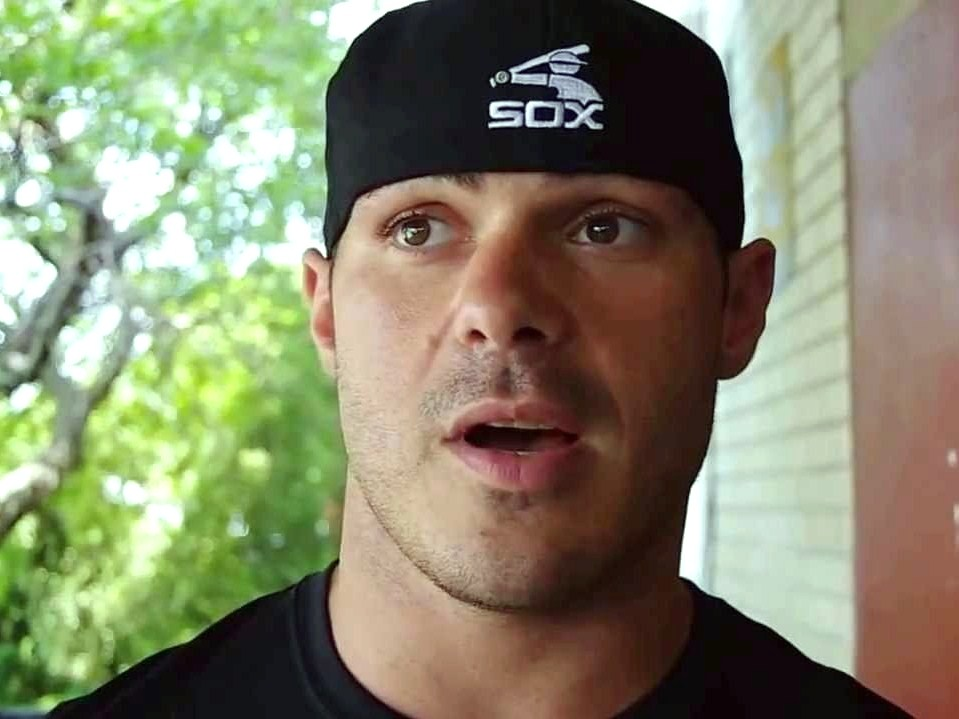

Personal information
- Nickname: Merciless
- Nationality: American
- Born: February 11, 1980 (age 46) Oak Lawn, Illinois, United States
- Height: 6 ft 1 in (185 cm)
- Weight: Heavyweight

Boxing career
- Reach: 75 in (191 cm)
- Stance: Orthodox

Boxing record
- Total fights: 29
- Wins: 21
- Win by KO: 13
- Losses: 7
- Draws: 1
- No contests: 0

Mike Mollo (born February 11, 1980) is an American former professional boxer. A fan favorite for his aggressive style in Chicago, Mollo is perhaps best known for his bouts with Polish fighters Art Binkowski, Artur Szpilka, Andrew Golota, and Krzysztof Zimnoch. He was managed by Darnell Nicholson.

== Background ==
Born into a working class Italian family in Chicago's south suburbs, Mollo got into numerous scuffles on the streets of his neighborhood. Already 230 pounds as a 14-year-old, he was quickly taken to the local boxing club to hone his skills, and apply his energy in a more constructive manner.

== Professional career ==
After a brief amateur career, "Merciless" Mike Mollo made his professional debut on June 25, 2000, scoring a first-round knockout over Terry Coffin in Elgin, Illinois. Over the following years, Mollo built his professional record while also working full-time as a bricklayer and tuckpointer. Wildly popular with Chicago fight fans, Mollo used his hard-punching, aggressive style to win 19 of his first 20 professional bouts. His first loss was to heavyweight contender DaVarryl Williamson.

On October 7, 2006, Mollo scored his biggest win, knocking out Kevin McBride (best known for defeating Mike Tyson) by a TKO 30 seconds into the second round.

After a second-round TKO of Art Binkowski, Mollo faced 40-year old former world title challenger Andrew Golota. Mollo lost via unanimous decision.

One of Mollo's more high-profile matchups was his two bouts against then-undefeated and future WBC world title challenger Artur Szpilka. Despite being a heavy underdog in the first fight and not having competed for two years prior to the bout, Mollo was able to knock down Szpilka before being knocked out in the sixth round. The two faced off again six months later, with Mollo again knocking Szpilka down early in the match before being finished in the fifth round via TKO.

Three years after his second loss to Szpilka, Mollo faced another Polish fighter, Krzysztof Zimnoch. In a significant upset, Mollo knocked out the 18-0-1 Zimnoch in the first round to win the vacant Republic of Poland International Heavyweight title. From this win, Mollo earned a shot at Andriy Rudenko's WBC Silver International Heavyweight title. Mollo was defeated via unanimous decision.

Mollo then faced off against Krzysztof Zimnoch in a rematch from the year before. Mollo lost the rematch via corner stoppage.

On March 1, 2017, Mollo officially announced his retirement from professional boxing.

== Influences ==
Early in his career, Mollo gained the support of Rocky Marciano's family. "I understand that Mike wants to emulate Rocky both in and out of the ring", noted Peter Marciano, younger brother of the "Brockton Blockbuster". Mollo remembers Marciano well. "I grew up watching fight films of Rocky Marciano. Both of our families came from Naples, Italy, so Rocky was a hero to my family. My strength and conditioning coach Joe Wright gave me a rare book written by Rocky called 'The Use of the Body'. Joe found this book in 1967 while he was somewhere in England. I've been reading it and it's a masterpiece." Mollo continued, "I can't be Rocky, but I'm truly honored to have the support of the Marciano family. I hope to make them proud."

== Personal life ==
Mollo is married with children and resides in the Chicago, South Suburbs, Illinois area. He currently works in a variety of jobs, including running a boxing course and gym.

== Professional boxing record ==
| 29 fights | 21 wins | 7 losses |
|---|---|---|
| By knockout | 13 | 4 |
| By decision | 8 | 3 |
| Draws | 1 | |

| No. | Result | Record | Opponent | Type | Round, time | Date | Location | Notes |
|---|---|---|---|---|---|---|---|---|
| 29 | Loss | 21–7–1 | Krzysztof Zimnoch | RTD | (7) 10, 3:00 | Feb 25, 2017 | Azoty Arena, Szczecin, Poland | |
| 28 | Loss | 21–6–1 | Andriy Rudenko | TD | (7) 12 | May 6, 2016 | Ministerium, Odessa, Ukraine | For vacant WBC International Silver heavyweight title |
| 27 | Win | 21–5–1 | Krzysztof Zimnoch | KO | 1 (10), 2:08 | Feb 20, 2016 | Arena Hall, Legionowo, Poland | Won vacant Republic of Poland International heavyweight title |
| 26 | Loss | 20–5–1 | Artur Szpilka | TKO | 5 (10), 1:41 | Aug 13, 2013 | U.S. Cellular Field, Chicago, Illinois, U.S. | |
| 25 | Loss | 20–4–1 | Artur Szpilka | KO | 6 (8), 2:45 | Feb 1, 2013 | UIC Pavilion, Chicago, Illinois, U.S. | |
| 24 | Draw | 20–3–1 | Gary Gomez | MD | 8 | Aug 6, 2010 | UIC Pavilion, Chicago, Illinois, U.S. | |
| 23 | Win | 20–3 | Billy Zumbrun | UD | 8 | Mar 26, 2010 | UIC Pavilion, Chicago, Illinois, U.S. | |
| 22 | Loss | 19–3 | Jameel McCline | UD | 12 | Nov 7, 2008 | Sichuan Gymnasium, Chengdu, China | |
| 21 | Loss | 19–2 | Andrew Golota | UD | 12 | Jan 19, 2008 | Madison Square Garden, New York, New York, U.S. | Lost WBA Fedelatin heavyweight title |
| 20 | Win | 19–1 | Art Binkowski | TKO | 2 (10), 1:25 | Oct 13, 2007 | Sears Centre, Hoffman Estates, Illinois, U.S. | |
| 19 | Win | 18–1 | Zack Page | UD | 8 | Mar 2, 2007 | Belterra Casino Resort, Belterra, Indiana, U.S. | |
| 18 | Win | 17–1 | Kevin McBride | TKO | 2 (12), 0:44 | Oct 8, 2006 | Allstate Arena, Rosemont, Illinois, U.S. | Won vacant WBA Fedelatin heavyweight title |
| 17 | Win | 16–1 | Willie Walker | KO | 1 (6), 0:25 | Aug 25, 2006 | Aragon Ballroom 1106 W Lawrence, Chicago, Illinois, U.S. | |
| 16 | Loss | 15–1 | DaVarryl Williamson | TKO | 4 (10), 2:59 | May 6, 2006 | DCU Center, Worcester, Massachusetts, U.S. | |
| 15 | Win | 15–0 | Rogerio Lobo | KO | 6 (12), 2:48 | Nov 4, 2005 | Cicero Stadium, Cicero, Illinois, U.S. | Won vacant WBC, IBF, and WBO Latino heavyweight titles |
| 14 | Win | 14–0 | Troy Weida | TKO | 1 (10), 1:31 | Jul 13, 2005 | Majestic Star Casino, Gary, Indiana, U.S. | |
| 13 | Win | 13–0 | Shawn Robinson | TKO | 1 (6), 2:51 | Apr 27, 2005 | Italian Sports Hall of Fame, Chicago, Illinois, U.S. | |
| 12 | Win | 12–0 | Eric French | UD | 4 | Jun 15, 2004 | The Belvedere, Elk Grove Village, Illinois, U.S. | |
| 11 | Win | 11–0 | Siarhei Dychkou | UD | 4 | Mar 28, 2003 | Ramada Inn, Rosemont, Illinois, U.S. | |
| 10 | Win | 10–0 | Brian McIntyre | KO | 1 (4), 1:55 | Mar 15, 2003 | UIC Pavilion, Chicago, Illinois, U.S. | |
| 9 | Win | 9–0 | Jessie Tucker | UD | 6 | Nov 27, 2002 | Ramada Inn, Rosemont, Illinois, U.S. | |
| 8 | Win | 8–0 | Marcelo Aravena | UD | 4 | Nov 17, 2002 | Ralph Engelstad Arena, Grand Forks, North Dakota, U.S. | |
| 7 | Win | 7–0 | Louis Parker | KO | 1 (4), 0:36 | Sep 27, 2002 | Ramada Inn, Rosemont, Illinois, U.S. | |
| 6 | Win | 6–0 | John Clark | UD | 4 | Aug 10, 2002 | Emerald Queen Casino, Tacoma, Washington, U.S. | |
| 5 | Win | 5–0 | Donnie Penelton | UD | 4 | Nov 21, 2001 | Ramada Inn, Rosemont, Illinois, U.S. | |
| 4 | Win | 4–0 | Nathan Crawford | KO | 1 (4), 1:00 | Oct 17, 2001 | Ramada Inn, Rosemont, Illinois, U.S. | |
| 3 | Win | 3–0 | Calvin Miller | KO | 1 (4), 0:38 | Feb 16, 2001 | DePaul Alumni Hall, Chicago, Illinois, U.S. | |
| 2 | Win | 2–0 | Joe Helton | KO | 1 (4), 0:19 | Aug 20, 2000 | Casino Queen, East Saint Louis, Illinois, U.S. | |
| 1 | Win | 1–0 | Terrence Coffin | KO | 1 (4), 2:03 | Jun 25, 2000 | Grand Victoria Casino, Elgin, Illinois, U.S. | |
