= Stadion Miejski w Legionowie im. ks. płk. Jana Mrugacza =

Multi-purpose stadium in Legionowo, Poland

Coordinates: 52.3766°N 20.9255°E

The Colonel Father Jan Mrugacz Municipal Stadium (Polish: Stadion Miejski im. ks. płk. Jana Mrugacza) is a multi-purpose stadium in Legionowo, Poland. It can seat 1730 spectators. The players of the Legionovia Legionowo club play their games there.

The facility was opened on 18 July 1964, and a significant role in the Social Committee for Stadium Construction was played by the colonel priest Jan Mrugacz. Since 14 August 2004, the stadium has been named after him.

During UEFA Euro 2012, the stadium acted as a training center for the Greece national football team.
