= Radosław Sylwestrzak =

Polish footballer (born 1992)

Personal information
- Date of birth: 8 September 1992 (age 34)
- Place of birth: Słubice, Poland
- Height: 1.87 m (6 ft 2 in)
- Position: Defender

Team information
- Current team: Lechia Zielona Góra (conditioning coach)

Youth career
- Odra Górzyca
- Polonia Słubice

Senior career*
Years	Team	Apps	(Gls)
2011–2012	Ilanka Rzepin	23	(1)
2012	Lechia Zielona Góra	15	(3)
2013	Ilanka Rzepin	29	(3)
2014	GKS Katowice	6	(0)
2015	Formacja Port 2000 Mostki	12	(1)
2015	Radomiak Radom	7	(1)
2016–2017	Siarka Tarnobrzeg	39	(1)
2017–2019	Widzew Łódź	43	(5)
2019–2021	Stal Rzeszów	36	(2)
2021–2023	KSZO Ostrowiec Świętokrzyski	47	(7)
2023–2024	Lechia Zielona Góra	26	(2)
2024–2025	Carina Gubin	10	(0)
Total		293	(26)
- * Club domestic league appearances and goals

Radosław Sylwestrzak (born 8 September 1992) is a Polish former professional footballer who played as a defender. He is currently a conditioning coach for II liga club Lechia Zielona Góra.

== Career ==
Sylwestrzak started his career with Polish fourth division side Ilanka Rzepin.

Before the second half of the 2013–14 season, Sylwestrzak signed for GKS Katowice in the Polish second division, where he made 7 appearances and scored 0 goals.

In early 2015, he joined Polish fourth division club Formacja Port 2000 Mostki.

In 2015, he signed for Radomiak Radom in the Polish third division.

In 2017, Sylwestrzak signed for Polish fourth division team Widzew Łódź.

In 2019, he signed for Stal Rzeszów in the Polish third division.

== Honours ==
Formacja Port 2000 Mostki

- III liga Lower Silesia–Lubusz: 2014–15

Widzew Łódź

- III liga, group I: 2017–18

Lechia Zielona Góra

- Polish Cup (Lubusz regionals): 2023–24
