= Legionovia Legionowo (football) =

Polish football club

- Full name: Klub Sportowy Legionovia Legionowo
- Nickname: Novia
- Founded: 1930; 96 years ago (as Robotniczy Klub Sportowy Czerwoni)
- Ground: Lt. Jan Mrugacz Municipal Stadium
- Capacity: 1,730
- Chairman: Dariusz Ziąbski
- Manager: Patryk Drewnowski
- League: IV liga Masovia
- 2024–25: IV liga Masovia, 7th of 18
- Website: www.kslegionovia.pl
colours	colours

Legionovia Legionowo is a Polish football club based in the city of Legionowo, Mazovia. As of the 2025–26 season, they compete in the IV liga Masovia, after suffering relegation from the 2023–24 III liga.

== History ==
They were founded in 1930, as part of the multi-sports club, by members of the Polish Socialist Party under the name Workers' Sports Club The Reds (Polish: Robotniczy Klub Sportowy Czerwoni). It was one of the few clubs that continued to play during the World War II.

In the 2018–19 season, they reached the last 16 of the Polish Cup.

They have been playing in the III liga for most of the 21st century, with the exception of between 2013 and 2018 when they played in the third division.

== Current squad ==
Note: Flags indicate national team as defined under FIFA eligibility rules; some limited exceptions apply. Players may hold more than one non-FIFA nationality.

No.	Pos.	Nation	Player
1	GK	POL	Dominik Wyszyński
2	DF	POL	Eryk Kwiatosz
3	DF	POL	Adam Waszkiewicz
4	DF	UKR	Ilya Kalpachuk
6	DF	POL	Dominik Ptaszyński
7	MF	POL	Hubert Michalik
8	MF	UKR	Kyrylo Knysh
9	FW	POL	Ignacy Ognicha
10	MF	POL	Karol Ziąbski
11	MF	POL	Dariusz Partyka
12	GK	POL	Kacper Reks
14	MF	POL	Karol Witkowski
17	MF	POL	Maurycy Przybył

No.	Pos.	Nation	Player
19	DF	POL	Jakub Karabin
20	MF	POL	Jakub Skop
21	DF	POL	Adam Zbyszyński
23	MF	POL	Maciej Chojnowski
24	DF	POL	Bartosz Michalik
27	FW	POL	Dariusz Zjawiński
33	GK	POL	Kacper Szymczyk
37	DF	UKR	Bogdan Novikov
50	DF	POL	Tadzio Sochoń
72	FW	POL	Mateusz Zaparuszewski
75	MF	POL	Alex Radwański
77	MF	POL	Gracjan Konopski
99	FW	POL	Arkadiusz Drapsa

== Stadium ==
The club plays their home games at the Municipal Stadium.
