= Kamil Radulj =

Polish footballer (born 1988)

Personal information
- Full name: Kamil Radulj
- Date of birth: 9 October 1988 (age 38)
- Place of birth: Krosno, Poland
- Height: 1.77 m (5 ft 9 1/2 in)
- Position: Midfielder

Youth career
- Wisłok Krościenko Wyżne

Senior career*
Years	Team	Apps	(Gls)
2004	Krośnianka-Karpaty Krosno		
2005–2006	Stal Mielec		
2006–2009	Korona Kielce	3	(0)
2008	Korona Kielce II	5	(0)
2009	Hetman Zamość	3	(1)
2010–2012	Karpaty Krosno	48	(10)
2012–2017	Stal Mielec	106	(27)
2017–2019	Siarka Tarnobrzeg	58	(16)
2019–2021	Resovia Rzeszów	34	(9)
2021–2022	Stal Stalowa Wola	13	(3)
2023–2026	Karpaty Krosno	92	(35)
- * Club domestic league appearances and goals

Kamil Radulj (born 9 October 1988) is a Polish former professional footballer who played as a midfielder.

== Honours ==
Stal Mielec

- II liga: 2015–16
- III liga Lublin–Subcarpathia: 2012–13

Stal Stalowa Wola

- Polish Cup (Stalowa Wola regionals): 2021–22
