= Legionowo Arena =

Indoor multi-sports arena in Legionowo, Poland

- Arena Legionowo

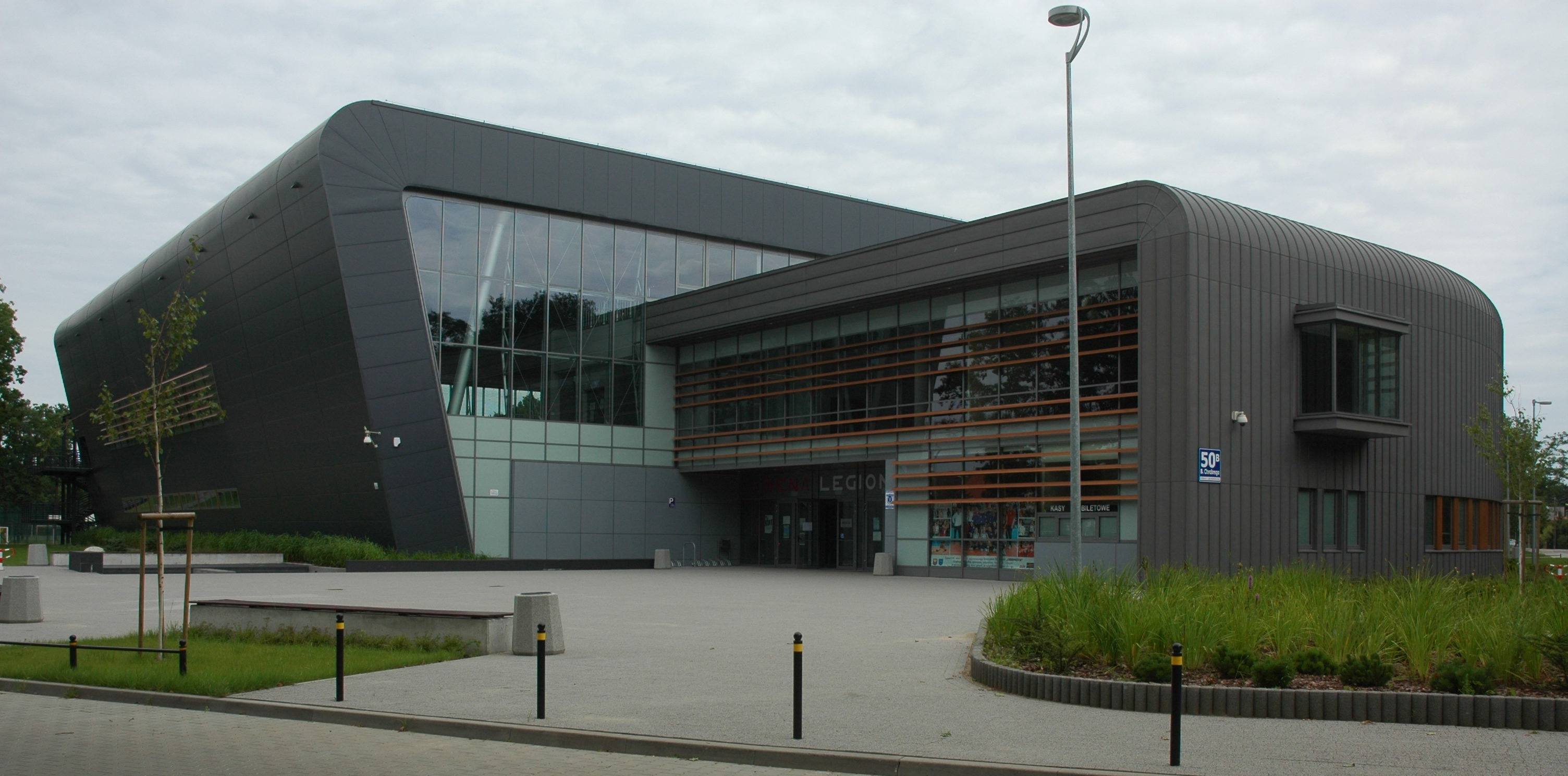
- Interactive map of Legionowo Arena
- Full name: Hala widowiskowo - sportowa DPD Arena Legionowo
- Address: ul.Chrobrego 50b, 05-120 Legionowo; Legionowo
- Coordinates: 52.400199°N 20.917274°E
- Owner: Legionowo City Council
- Operator: Legionowo City Council
- Capacity: 1,998
- Field size: 45x28m
- Acreage: 6116 m^{2}

Construction
- Groundbreaking: 2009
- Built: 2009-2010
- Opened: 15 August 2010
- Architect: Radek Guzowski
- Builders: Mostostal Warszawa S.A. Mostostal Puławy S.A.

Tenants
- Legionovia Legionowo Volleyball; Legion Legionowo; KPR Legionowo

Website
- http://arenalegionowo.pl/

Legionowo Arena (Polish: Arena Legionowo) is an indoor multi-sports arena in Legionowo, Mazovia.

Since 2018 DPD have been the titular sponsors of the arena.
