= Legionowo =

City in Masovian Voivodeship, Poland

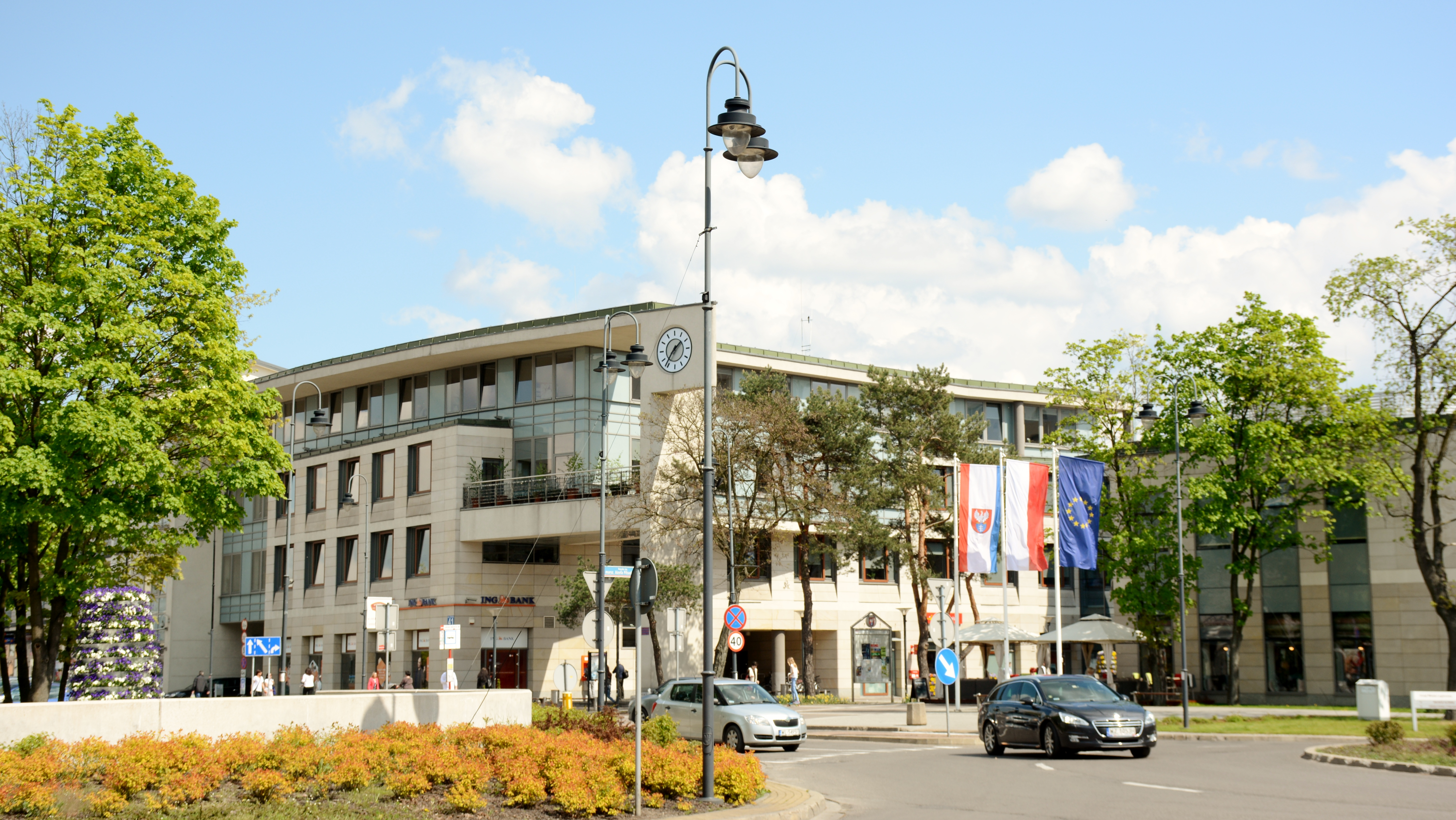
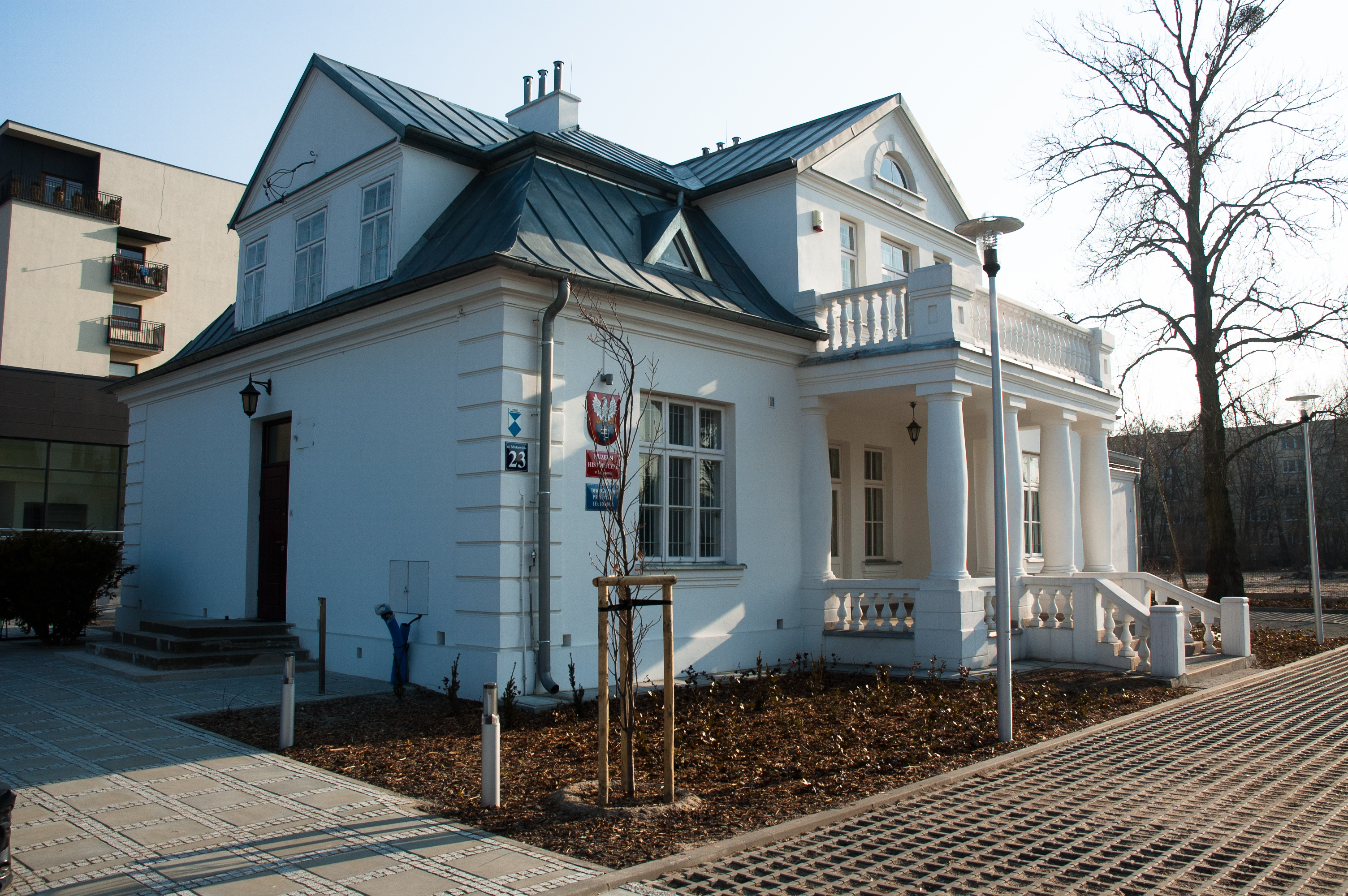
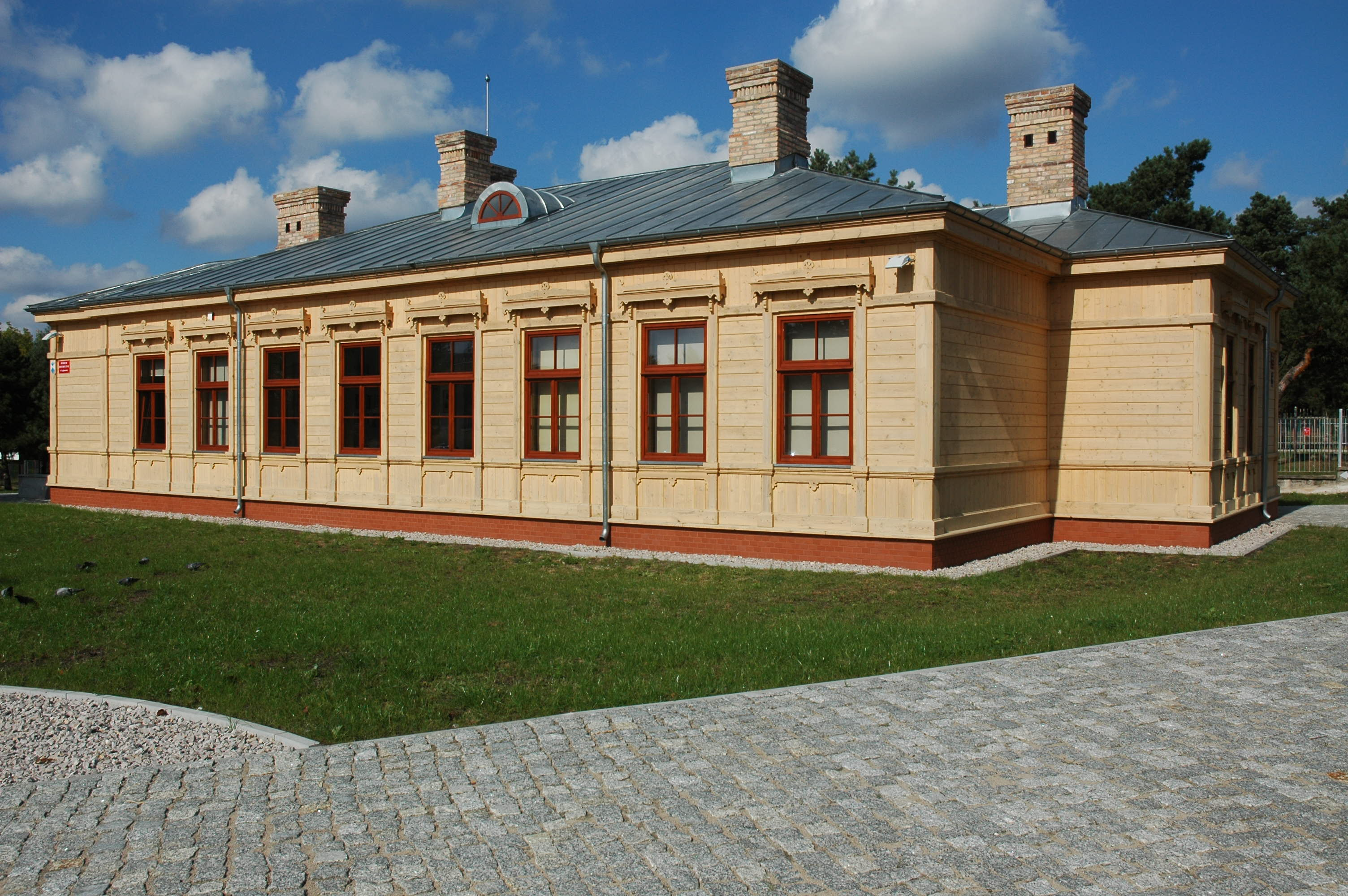
- From top, left to right: City hall; Villa Bratki; Piaski branch of the Historical Museum

- Flag Coat of arms

- Location within Poland
- Coordinates: 52°24′N 20°55′E
- Country: Poland
- Voivodeship: Masovian
- County: Legionowo County
- Gmina: Legionowo (urban gmina)
- Established: 1877
- City rights: 1952

Government
  - City mayor: Bogdan Kiełbasiński (PL2050)

Area
  - Total: 1,354 ha (3,350 acres)
- Elevation: 80 m (260 ft)

Population (31 December 2021)
  - Total: 53,205 ▼
- Time zone: UTC+1 (CET)
  - Summer (DST): UTC+2 (CEST)
- Postal code: 05-118 to 05-122
- Area code: +48 022
- Car plates: WL and WF
- Website: http://www.legionowo.pl

Legionowo [lɛɡʲjɔˈnɔvɔ] is a city in Masovian Voivodeship in east-central Poland, seat of the Legionowo County.

== Location ==
Legionowo is located 23 kilometres (14 miles) to the north-east of the center of Warsaw and only 7 kilometres (4 miles) to the south of Zegrze Reservoir (Jezioro Zegrzyńskie or Zalew Zegrzyński), near the Warsaw-Gdańsk railroad and Warsaw-Suwałki road.

Adjoining counties (from north, clockwise): Pułtusk County, Wyszków County, Wołomin County, Warsaw, Warsaw West County, Nowy Dwór County.

== Education ==
There are four high schools in the town of which three are public and one is private faith-based.

Higher education is only currently represented by a police training academy. Between 2001 and 2006 a private Economic-Technical College (Polish: Wyższa Szkoła Ekonomiczno-Techniczna) was present in the town.

== History ==
- Legionowo's history dates back to 1877, when Jabłonna Nowa (New Jabłonna) rail station was built. The name comes from Jabłonna, the nearby village, where in 1774-1779 Bishop Michał Poniatowski (brother of Poland's last king, Stanisław Poniatowski) built his palace Jabłonna Palace (Polish: Pałac w Jabłonnie) - now owned by the Polish Academy of Sciences.
- In 1892, the Russian army barracks were built near the railroad station (Obóz Hurki) and a local garrison of the Russian army was stationed there, as a part of Warsaw Stronghold Region (Warszawski Rejon Umocniony), until the beginning of World War I, when this region was occupied by the German troops.
- In 1912, Legionowo is given a city rights.
- In 1919, Jabłonna Nowa was renamed as Legionowo to honour Polish Legions.
- Ca. 1920 Institute of Aerology (currently Aerology Centre within Institute of Meteorology and Water Administration, Ośrodek Aerologii Instytutu Meteorologii i Gospodarki Wodnej) was opened.
- During the Battle for Warsaw (Bitwa o Warszawę) in August 1920, from barracks in Legionowo, General Żeligowski led the 10th Infantry Division (10. Dywizja Piechoty) to Radzymin, which helped to save Warsaw from the Red Army.
- In 1922, the Aviotex balloon and parachute factory, which also produced tents and other camping equipment (e.g. sleeping bags), opened in Legionowo.
- After 1925, Legionowo became a summer resort for inhabitants of Warsaw, as by that time, it was a wooded and unpolluted area.
- Between World War I and World War II, narrow-gauge railroad line connected Legionowo with Warsaw, going through Jabłonna.
- In 1930, Legionowo became a commune (gmina).
- During World War II, a ward of the Stalag 368 prisoner-of-war camp in Beniaminów and a ghetto were located in Legionowo.
- During World War II, in 1944, Legionowo took part in Warsaw Uprising, as so-called District 7: Collar (Obwód 7: Obroża). During the first week of August 1944, Legionowo was a place of regular fights between German troops and Polish rebels. After a week or so, Germans put down the uprising and several Poles were executed in one of the military shelters near the railroad line.
- After World War II, there was a brick factory, now non-existent.
- In the 1950s, the standard-gauge railroad line was electrified.
- In the late 1960s, a narrow-gauge railroad line was closed and in the early 1970s, the tracks were removed. The terminus and depot buildings remain, currently in private use.
- In the 1960s, the first 4-storey blocks of flats were built. In the 1970s and 1980s, three large groups of flats (4-storey and 11-storey) were built.
- In 1977, a tinware factory "Bistyp" was opened.
- In the early 1980s, a house factory was built near Legionowo, which made prefabricated elements for blocks of flats built in the region. The factory is now closed.
- In August 1990, the Police Training Centre (Centrum Szkolenia Policji), one of two such institutions in Poland, was opened.
- After the big flood in southern parts of Poland in 1997, the Aerology Institute was equipped with Doppler meteorological radar, able to scan about a fifth of Poland's area for storm and rain clouds. It is now part of SMOK (The Hydrological and Meteorological Monitoring Forecasting and Protection System, Polish: System Monitoringu i Osłony Kraju).
- In 2012, Legionowo hosted the Greek football team during the Euro 2012 football competition.

== Railway station ==
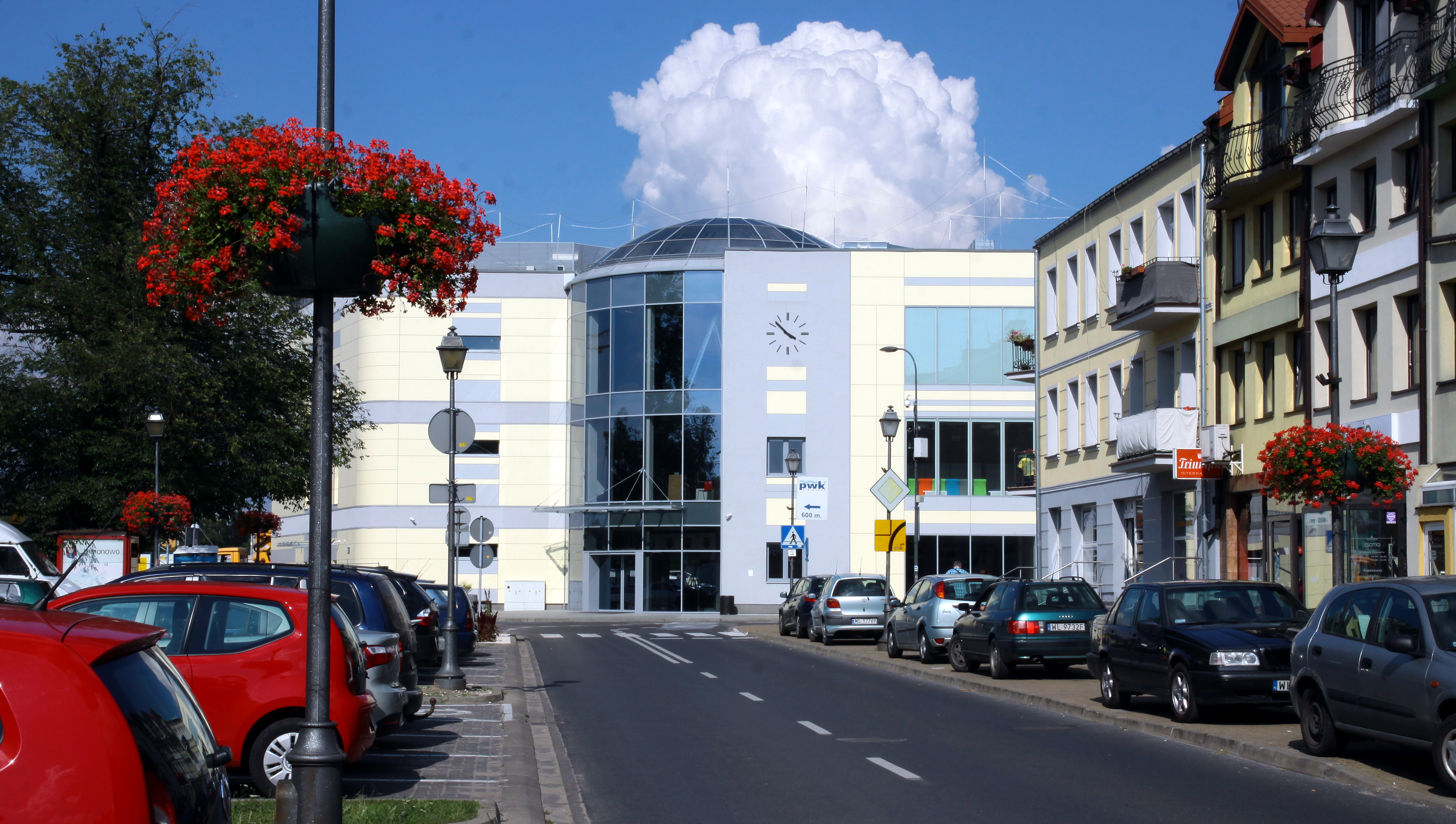
Main railway station

The Legionowo railway station is served by Masovian Railways, who run the KM9 services from Warszawa Zachodnia or Warszawa Wola to Działdowo, Szybka Kolej Miejska, who run the S9 services from Warszawa Gdańska to Wieliszew and by PKP Intercity by their cross-country services to Kraków, Kołobrzeg, Olsztyn, Bielsko-Biała, Gdynia and also to Warszawa Zachodnia.

A major redevelopment of the station has been made between 2014 and 2016 with a large amount of the funding coming from Swiss Contribution. It included a transport hub, a multi-storey car park, shops and more.

== Sport ==
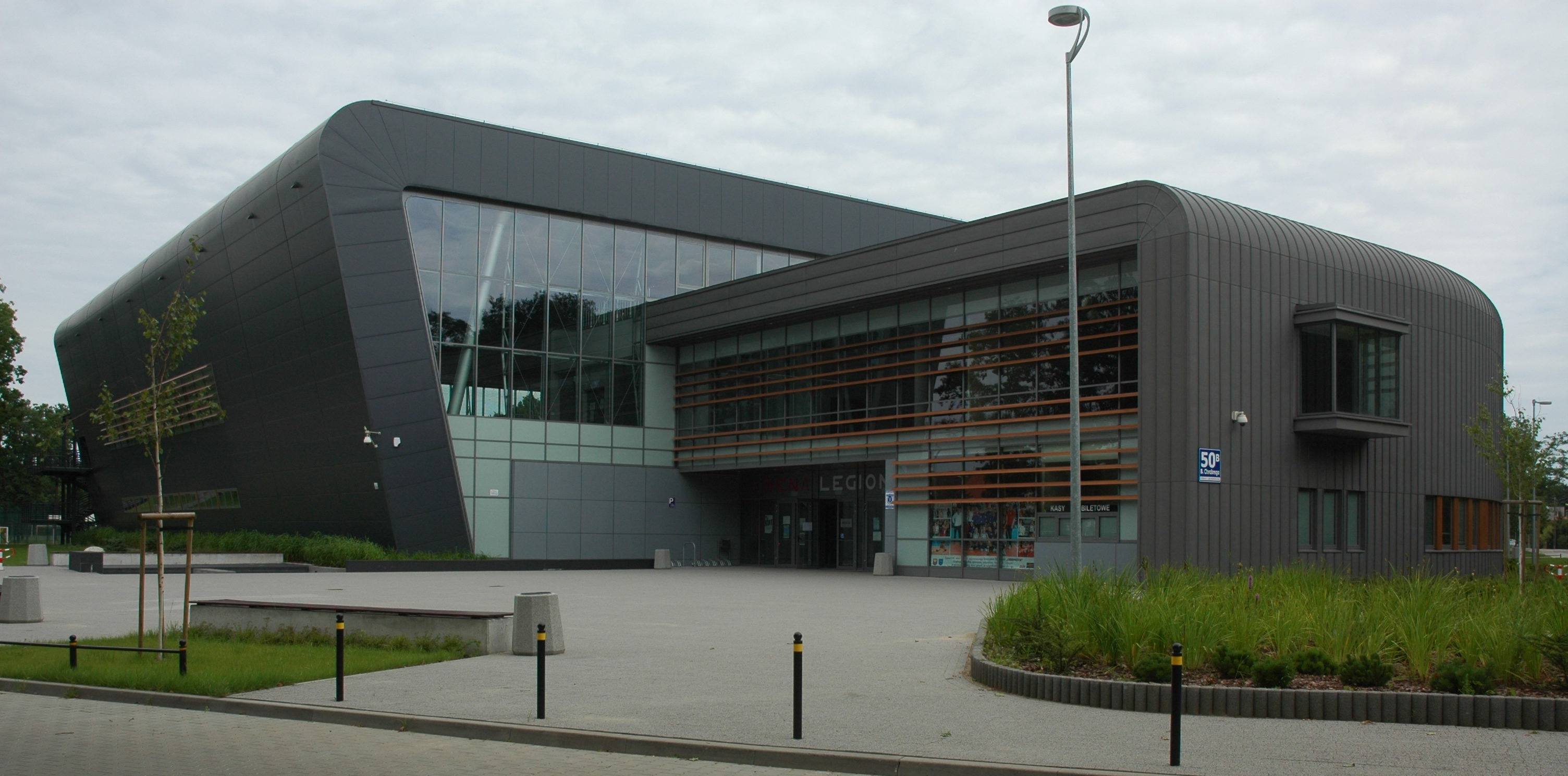
Arena Legionowo

The Legionovia Legionowo association football team is based at the local municipal stadium and play in the fourth division.

A club of the same name is also one of the top professional women's volleyball clubs, playing in the highest division.

The local arena hosts all the town's indoor sports clubs as well as music, MMA, boxing and other events.

== Sights ==
- Russian army barracks, made of red Russian bricks (larger than standard Polish ones)
- Wooden summer resort houses, nowadays some of them located in the centre of Legionowo
- St. Joseph's Church (Kościół Św. Józefa, Kościół Garnizonowy) built in 1945
- Holy Spirit Church (Kościół Św. Ducha) built in years 1979–1985 in place of an old wooden one.

== Notable people ==
- Ola Jordan (born 1982), Ballroom Dancer
- Wojciech Lemański (born 1960), a suspended Roman Catholic priest
- Jan Lodzik (born 1995), boxer and kickboxer

== International relations ==
=== Twin towns — Sister cities ===
Legionowo is twinned with:

- Kovel, Ukraine
- Sevlievo, Bulgaria
- Jiujiang, China
- Carnikava, Latvia
- (Georgia (country)) Borjomi, Georgia

Former twin towns:

- Rzhev, Russia (terminated due to the 2022 Russian invasion of Ukraine)
